= 2022 Houston Astros season =

61st season in Major League Baseball for the Houston Astros

2022 Houston Astros
- World Series champions American League champions American League West champions
- League: American League
- Division: West
- Ballpark: Minute Maid Park
- City: Houston, Texas
- Record: 106–56 (.654)
- Divisional place: 1st
- Owners: Jim Crane
- General managers: James Click
- Managers: Dusty Baker
- Television: AT&T SportsNet Southwest (Todd Kalas, Kevin Eschenfelder, Geoff Blum, Mike Stanton)
- Radio: KTRH 740 Weekday Night Games Sportstalk 790; Houston Astros Radio Network (Robert Ford, Steve Sparks, Geoff Blum); KLAT (Spanish) (Francisco Romero, Alex Treviño)
- Stats: ESPN.com; Baseball Reference

The 2022 Houston Astros season was the 61st season for the Major League Baseball (MLB) franchise located in Houston, Texas, their 58th as the Astros, 10th in both the American League (AL) and AL West division, and 23rd at Minute Maid Park. The Astros, who entered the season as both the defending AL and AL West champions, looked to avenge their 2021 World Series loss to the Atlanta Braves. (Note: Concurrently, the Astros had qualified as entrants into a fifth consecutive American League Championship Series (ALCS) of seven total from 2017 to 2023, an unprecedented streak in franchise history.)

An owners' lockout of players was implemented on December 2, 2021, following the expiration of the collective bargaining agreement (CBA) between MLB and the MLB Players Association (MLBPA), and concluded March 10, 2022, delaying the start of the regular season by one week. On April 7, Framber Valdez made his first Opening Day start for Houston at Angel Stadium, as the Astros defeated Los Angeles, 3–1. It was the Astros' tenth consecutive victory on Opening Day to establish a modern-day major league record. (Note: Also tied the Boston Beaneaters (1887–1896) for the all-time record.) On May 3, Dusty Baker became the 12th manager all-time to attain 2,000 wins with a 4–0 win over the Seattle Mariners.

Two Astros pitchers, Luis García and Phil Maton, each tossed an immaculate inning on June 15, to achieve the first occurrence in major league history in which more than one immaculate inning was pitched on the same day. On June 25, Cristian Javier, Héctor Neris and Ryan Pressly combined to no-hit the New York Yankees for the 14th no-hitter in team history. (Note: The only team to no-hit the Yankees in New York since 1958, Houston had previously no-hit them on June 11, 2003, when Roy Oswalt, Peter Munro, Kirk Saarloos, Brad Lidge, Octavio Dotel and Billy Wagner performed the feat at Yankee Stadium I. The no-hitter in 2003 was also the last time the Yankees' lineup had been no-hit.) The following game, José Urquidy extended the hitless streak of New York to 16 1/3 innings, tying an expansion-era record. Five Astros players garnered selection to the MLB All-Star Game, including pitcher Justin Verlander (ninth career selection), second baseman Jose Altuve (eighth), designated hitter Yordan Alvarez, outfielder Kyle Tucker, and Valdez (first each), while Dusty Baker was named manager (second selection).

The Astros secured a sixth consecutive playoff berth following a 5–0 win against the Oakland Athletics on September 16. On September 19, they clinched their fifth AL West title in the last six seasons following a 4–0 win against the Tampa Bay Rays. With a 106–56 regular season record, this win total represented the second-highest total to date in franchise history—trailing only the 2019 club (107)—and fifth time having reached 100. Their AL West title was the 12th division title in franchise history, seventh playoff berth over the previous eight seasons, and 16th playoff appearance overall.

Houston swept Seattle in the American League Division Series (ALDS) to reach the American League Championship Series (ALCS) for a sixth straight season, in doing so becoming the first team in major league history to win a postseason series in six consecutive seasons. Starting with Alvarez' walk-off home run in Game 1 of the ALDS, he hit three go-ahead home runs with his team trailing in the sixth inning or later during the 2022 playoffs; no other player had ever done so more than once during his career. The Astros then swept the New York Yankees in the ALCS for their fourth AL pennant and fifth pennant overall. They advanced to the World Series and faced the Philadelphia Phillies. In Game 4, Javier, Bryan Abreu, Rafael Montero, and Pressly all combined for another no-hitter, just the second in World Series history. On November 5, they defeated the Phillies 4–1 in Game 6 at Minute Maid Park to win their second championship and first since 2017, capped by Alvarez' third go-ahead home run of the playoffs. Rookie shortstop Jeremy Peña claimed both ALCS and World Series Most Valuable Player (MVP) honors after having hit .345 with four home runs and eight runs batted in during the playoffs.

Following the season, Verlander won his third Cy Young Award, Altuve and Alvarez both won Silver Slugger Awards, and Peña and Tucker won Gold Glove Awards. Moreover, Altuve, Alvarez, Verlander and Valdez all received All-MLB First Team honors, while Tucker and Pressly were selected to the All-MLB Second Team.

== Offseason ==
=== Summary ===
The Houston Astros entered the 2022 MLB season as runners-up in the 2021 World Series championship, falling to the Atlanta Braves in six games. It was the Astros' third World Series appearance in five years, including a route to their fifth consecutive American League (AL) Championship Series. They had won the AL West division with 95–67 record, their fourth division championship in five seasons.

==== Personnel ====
On November 3, 2021, the day following the ending of the World Series, seven Astros were declared free agents, including Carlos Correa, Yimi García, Marwin González, Kendall Graveman, Zack Greinke, Brooks Raley, and Justin Verlander.

Pitching coach Brent Strom announced on November 2 that he was leaving the organization and would contemplate retiring from professional baseball. Heralded as an essential architect of an era of increasingly-dominant Astros pitching, the 73 year-old rejoined the Astros in 2014. Ably blending his experience and teaching with analytics, he coached Dallas Keuchel and Verlander in their Cy Young-winning seasons (2015 and 2019, respectively) and was credited with assisting Gerrit Cole and Charlie Morton in elevating their own success. Club owner and chairman Jim Crane announced on November 5 that the Astros re-signed manager Dusty Baker for the 2022 season, to return for a third season with the club. Through the 2021 season, Baker had won 1,987 games in 24 seasons over his managerial career.

Former manager Bill Virdon died at age 90 on November 23, 2021, and was survived by his wife of 70 years, Shirley. He was the Astros' franchise leader in wins by a manager, and guided them to their first playoff berth in 1980, when they fell one victory short of advancing to the World Series. He managed the Astros for eight seasons, from 1975 to 1982, and also led the New York Yankees, Pittsburgh Pirates, and Montreal Expos. A former major league outfielder, Virdon hit .404 against the legendary Sandy Koufax, the highest average allowed to a single hitter by the Hall of Famer during his career.

==== Uniform addition ====
To celebrate the 60th anniversary of Major League Baseball in Houston, the Astros unveiled commemorative shield patches for their New Era on-field caps and on the sleeve of the uniforms to be worn throughout the 2022 season. Displaying the number 60 prominently within an orange home plate-shaped shield, it was outlined with a navy blue border flanked by white piping on the outside of the border, and ensconced within the nadir of the shield, the Astros star-H logo. The outline of the state of Texas was suspended within the zero, the Colt .45 logo with "1962" on the bottom left side, and the current Astros wordmark logo and "2022" on the bottom right. The club would celebrate its 60 years in Houston throughout the season, including special commemorations Flashback Friday games.

=== Negotiation of collective bargaining agreement ===
==== Lockout ====
On December 1, 2021, the collective bargaining agreement (CBA) between the league and the Major League Baseball Players Association (MLBPA) expired, with no substantial, new agreement being materialized. Thus, the team owners voted unanimously to lockout the players, stopping all free agency and trades. On December 2, 2021, Commissioner of Baseball Rob Manfred announced that the league had instituted the lockout. On March 10, 2022, the MLB and MLBPA agreed to a new collective bargaining agreement, thus ending the lockout. Spring training games began on March 17. Opening Day, originally scheduled for March 31, would instead take place on April 7. Although MLB previously announced that series would be cancelled due to the lockout, the new agreement provided for a full, 162-game season, with any games cancelled games to be made up via doubleheaders.

==== Rule changes ====
Pursuant to the new CBA, several new rules were instituted for the 2022 season. The National League adopted the designated hitter full-time, a draft lottery was implemented, postseason eligibility was expanded from ten teams to twelve, and advertising patches appeared on player uniforms and helmets for the first time.

== Spring training ==
Two players continued recovery from injuries sustained in the 2021 American League Division Series (ALDS) and missed the start of the regular season with estimated return dates uncertain. Starting pitcher Lance McCullers Jr. (right forearm strain) was still unable to throw in spring training. Jake Meyers, who torn the labrum in his left shoulder, underwent surgery following the conclusion of the World Series. Forrest Whitley, on the Astros' 40-man roster, was recovering from Tommy John surgery as of the start of the 2022 season.

On March 30, the Astros named Framber Valdez their Opening Day starter, scheduled on April 7, 2022, versus the Los Angeles Angels. Justin Verlander, who had previously handled the duties, was technically available. Due to the shortened spring training and his rehabilitation from Tommy John surgery, he was instead scheduled to make his first start of the season on April 9.

The Astros and closer Ryan Pressly agreed to terms on a new contract extension on April 5, worth $30 million guaranteed. A two-year contract, it covered the 2023 and 2024 seasons, with an option for 2025.

== Regular season ==
=== Summary ===
==== April ====
Opening Weekend series, April 7–10 at Los Angeles Angels: Houston won series, 3–1

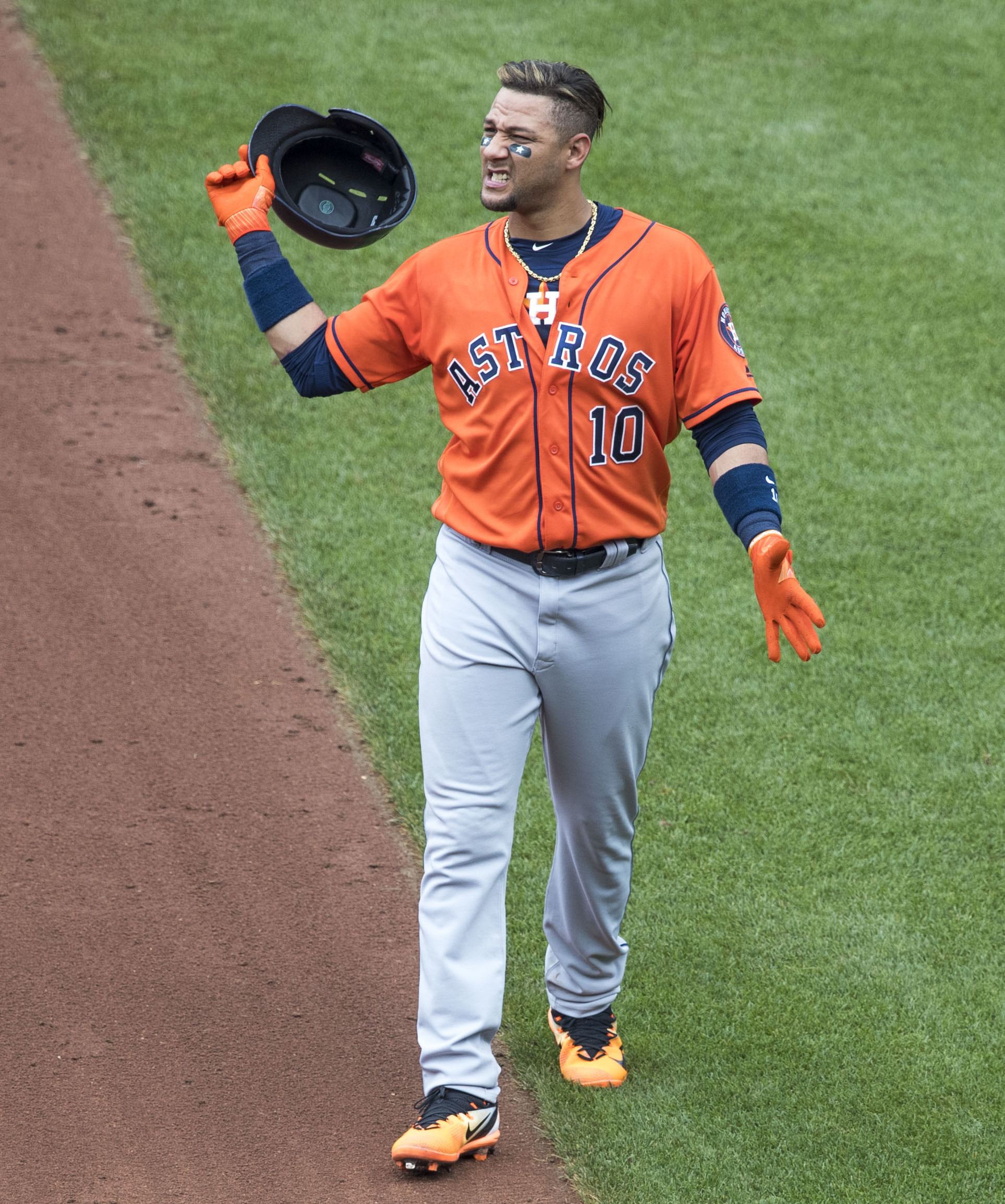
First baseman Yuli Gurriel walks off the field.

Opening Day starting lineup
Uniform	Player	Position	Starts
27	Jose Altuve	Second baseman	11
23	Michael Brantley	Left fielder	4
2	Alex Bregman	Third baseman	6
44	Yordan Alvarez	Designated hitter	2
10	Yuli Gurriel	First baseman	5
30	Kyle Tucker	Right fielder	2
3	Jeremy Peña (Note: Major league debut.)	Shortstop	1
20	Chas McCormick	Center fielder	1
15	Martín Maldonado	Catcher	3
59	Framber Valdez	Pitcher	1
Venue: Angel Stadium • Houston 3, Los Angeles 1 Sources:

On April 7, Astros left-handed pitcher Framber Valdez made his first career Opening Day start at Angel Stadium, opposite Los Angeles Angels two-way star Shohei Ohtani, the reigning American League (AL) Most Valuable Player (MVP). Rookie Jeremy Peña, making his major league debut, replaced at shortstop longtime franchise cornerstone Carlos Correa, who had departed via free agency. Valdez carried a shutout and had retired 15 consecutive batters until he pitched to Mike Trout in the bottom of the seventh inning. He reached on a throwing error by Peña, but Anthony Rendon grounded into a double play to deny the threat. Valdez, relying on his sinker in 50 percent of the pitches, got nine total ground ball outs. He recorded 6 2/3 scoreless innings pitched, while Ohtani allowed one run over 4 2/3 innings. Alex Bregman and Yordan Alvarez hit back-to-back home runs versus relief pitcher Ryan Tepera in the eighth inning. The Astros prevailed, 3–1, allowing Valdez to win his first start on Opening Day, and giving the club a record-tying 10th consecutive Opening Day win. The Boston Beaneaters first accomplished the feat from 1887 to 1896.

The Astros won the second game of the season, 13–6, aided by Peña's first major league home run. Batting versus Mike Mayers in the seventh inning, he hit it 423 feet to left field while his parents, Cecilia and former major league second baseman Gerónimo Peña, were interviewed by Heidi Watney on Apple TV+. The home run ignited an eight-run inning. Peña totaled three hits for the day—including his first in the major leagues in the second inning. Right fielder Kyle Tucker homered twice, and Jose Altuve, Aledmys Díaz and Alex Bregman each homered as well.

Ace Justin Verlander made his first start since July 24, 2020, on April 9 versus Los Angeles. He completed five innings, allowed three hits–yielding a home run to Jared Walsh–and struck out seven. Walsh's home provided all the offense in the game as the Angels handed the Astros their first defeat of the season in a 2–0 score.

In the April 10 game versus Los Angeles, starting pitcher José Urquidy debuted for the season with five solid innings that helped Houston hold on to a 2–1 lead. Four relievers hurled one scoreless inning apiece. Over his first four games, Peña collected six hits in 16 at bats.

On April 11, 2022, third baseman Alex Bregman was named AL Player of the Week. Over the four games comprising MLB's Opening Weekend, he batted .429 (6-for-14) with two home runs, six RBI and a 1.286 OPS.

Our City Connect uniform links the past and the present, making the old new, with a nod to our city’s great history of space travel.

— Anita Sehgal, Senior vice president of communications and marketing for the Astros

Release of City Connect jerseys

On April 10, the Astros announced the release of their Nike MLB City Connect jerseys to debut on April 20, 2022, and to be worn each Monday home game for the rest of the season. The theme of the uniform draws heavily on the city of Houston's connection with NASA, space and space travel and being home to the Johnson Space Center. The nickname for the city, "Space City," was featured prominently in NASA-inspired orange worm lettering across the chest on an all-navy blue uniform. The sleeve featured a mission patch with the flag of Texas with the Houston Astros star-H logo superimposed on the star, and one of each of Houston's four area codes adjacent to the flag's corners. The right pant leg featured the unconventional placement of each player's uniform number.

April 12–13 at Arizona Diamondbacks: Houston split series with ARI, 1–1

At Chase Field on April 12, José Siri's home run in the fifth inning versus Arizona Diamondbacks starter Madison Bumgarner traveled a Statcast-projected 456 feet onto the left-center-field concourse with an exit velocity of 109.7 mph, his second-hardest hit in 24 big league games. Siri singled versus Mark Melancon into right center field in the ninth inning to spark a ninth-inning rally. Altuve then walked, and Michael Brantley followed with single into left field to score Siri for the game-winning run with a final score of 2–1. Reliever Héctor Neris, a free agent acquisition, struck out two in a perfect eighth inning to earn in his first win in an Astros uniform. The following game, Arizona and Houston combined for to strand 28 baserunners while batting 1-for-19 with runners on base. Houston pitching walked nine Diamondbacks and hit another three. Closer Ryan Pressly, pitching in back-to-back contests for the first time on the season, issued two walks in the tenth before Ketel Marte lifted a sacrifice fly to score Seth Beer for the game-winning run.

April 15–17 at Seattle Mariners. The Astros' pitching staff had entered this game with a major league-leading 1.69 earned run average (ERA), but the Seattle Mariners won 11–1 at T-Mobile Park as the Astros' offense continued to struggle. Starter Jake Odorizzi allowed four earned runs in 4 1/3 innings, unable to command his fastball consistently nor find the feel for his secondary pitches. The lineup collected five total hits and Altuve and Tucker both were 0-for-4 and a combined 6-for-51 to start the season. Houston had scored five runs in their previous 28 innings.

The Astros placed Alvarez on the injured list on April 15 for "health and safety protocols," although manager Dusty Baker noted that he had not tested positive for COVID-19, but that "he's still feeling under the weather" since missing both games versus Arizona. Joe Perez was recalled from the Corpus Christi Hooks to take Alvarez' place on the roster. On April 16, Verlander shut out the Mariners for eight innings on his way to his first win of the season and first since Opening Day of 2020. He struck out eight, walked none, and permitted no runner to advance past first base in a 4–0 score. He also become the 138th pitcher to pass the 3,000 innings pitched threshold. Catcher Martín Maldonado hit his first home run of the season, scoring Jeremy Peña in the fifth inning. Due to a case of knee inflammation, Ryan Pressley was placed on the 10-day injured list on April 16.

After a hamstring injury to Altuve, the Astros called up first baseman J. J. Matijevic from the Sugar Land Space Cowboys. He made his major league debut on April 22 versus the Toronto Blue Jays, as a pinch hitter the ninth inning of a 4–3 loss, striking out in his lone at bat.

Having lost four games in a row going into the April 24 game, Peña hit his first career walk-off home run in the bottom of the 10th inning versus the Blue Jays, leading to an 8–7 victory.

April 25–28, at Texas Rangers: Houston won series, 3–1

On April 25, the Rangers won the opener to hand the Astros their fifth defeat in six games, after Adolis García's bases-clearing double in the seventh inning rallied Texas to a 6–2 win. Yordan Alvarez homered for the Astros, Kyle Tucker hit a two-run single, and starter Framber Valdez allowed one unearned run over six innings. Jake Odorizzi (1–2) started and won on April 26, ending a 10-game winless streak spanning since last August. He allowed one hit and two total baserunners. Tucker homered and drove in three runners. On April 27, Cristian Javier won his season starting debut; in five innings, he allowed two runs, four hits, and two walks. Tucker hit a three-run double in the fifth inning to score the decisive runs for a 4–3 final score. Matijevic received his first career start in the major leagues, manning first base on April 27. On Auril 28, Rangers starter Martín Pérez took a perfect game into the seventh inning until a leadoff double by Chas McCormick. Tucker, pinch hitting in the eighth inning, again hit a home run that provided the margin of victory for the Astros, 3–2.

==== May ====
The Astros finished the month of April with a record of 11–10. They began May with a loss to the Toronto Blue Jays to lose both series matchups with them. The next day, they faced the Seattle Mariners for three games with Jake Odorizzi, Cristian Javier and Justin Verlander pitching as starters. They proceeded to sweep the Mariners in convincing fashion, outscoring them 14-2 while not allowing a run for 23 innings. The Astros' defeat of the Martiners by the score of 4–0 on May 3 was also the 2,000th win of manager Dusty Baker's career, making him the 12th manager to reach the milestone, and first African American. (Note: Jeremy Peña was in the starting lineup for the Astros in the game that was Baker's 2,000th win. When Baker won his first game on April 6, 1993, as manager of the San Francisco Giants, Peña's father, Gerónimo, was the leadoff hitter for the Giants' opponent that day, the St. Louis Cardinals.)

May 5–8 vs Detroit Tigers: Houston won series, 4–0

Next was the Tigers, with Urquidy, Luis García, Framber Valdez, and Jake Odorizzi on the mound for the Astros. It was a tightly contested series that saw three games end with a 3–2 score before the final saw a 5–0 rout, and Houston won each one. On May 6, García matched a career-high with nine strikeouts over seven innings and allowed two hits and one earned run. Chas McCormick and Martín Maldonado hit back-to-back home runs in the second inning; Maldonado's home run provided the eventual decisive run in a 3–2 Astros win. On May 8, Aledmys Díaz hit a grand slam, and Odorizzi hurled five innings of one-hit ball to defeat the Tigers, 5–0, complete a sweep and a 7–0 homestand.

The Astros next traveled to Minnesota to face the Twins (missing newly acquired free agent Carlos Correa due to injury). Verlander started the first game and allowed just one hit in eight innings as Houston prevailed, 5–0. He suppressed any hits until reaching one out in the eighth inning, when Gio Urshela singled to right field to end the right-hander's fourth career no-hit bid.

Urquidy started the second game versus the Twins, but rain limited him to three innings pitched as the game was not completed until the next afternoon, which saw four relievers used by Houston in an 11–3 win. Garcia then started the final game of the three-game set and stuck out nine batters (tying a career high) in five innings for a 5–0 win. It was the tenth victory in a row for Houston and the seventh time since 2010 that Houston had a ten-game winning streak in the regular season, most for all teams in that span. A 6–1 win versus Washington Nationals at Nationals Park on May 13 extended the winning streak to 11 games, led by Valdez' 7 2/3 innings and one run allowed. The Astros' pitching staff as a whole had allowed 10 earned runs in 99 innings (0.91 ERA) during the streak. The Astros scored five runs in the first inning, including Yuli Gurriel's first home run of the season. The 2,009th win of Baker's career moved him past Leo Durocher for sole possession of 10th place in MLB history.

The Astros acquired infielder Mauricio Dubón from the San Francisco Giants for catcher Michael Papierski on May 14. Dubón is the second Honduran to play for the Astros; center fielder Gerald Young was the first.

A 13–6 loss to the Nationals on May 14 ended the winning streak. Until that loss, the Astros pitching staff led MLB with a 2.68 ERA; after this game, their ERA had risen to 3.00.

On May 17, the Astros tied the rare major league record of five home runs in one inning. (Note: Five home runs by one team in one inning had previously been accomplished seven other times in the major leagues, most recently by the New York Yankees on September 17, 2020.) Facing the Boston Red Sox, Yordan Alvarez, Kyle Tucker, Jeremy Peña, Michael Brantley, and Yuli Gurriel all hit home runs off Nathan Eovaldi in the second inning as the Astros rolled to a 13–4 victory; Tucker also hit a grand slam in the fourth inning to tie his career best for runs batted in (RBI) with six. On May 19 in a 5–1 win over the Texas Rangers, Altuve doubled for the 344th time in his career to pass César Cedeño for fourth place in franchise history.

May 19–22 vs Texas Rangers: Houston won series, 3–1

Framber Valdez tied his season-high with seven strikeouts over seven innings versus the Rangers on May 19, allowing one run on six hits to lead a 5–1 win. Jose Altuve collected a season-high four hits, and Martín Maldonado's bases loaded double in the eighth inning provided insurance runs.

May 30–June 1 at Oakland Athletics: Houston won series, 3–0

Valdez achieved the first complete game of the season for the Astros, and first of his career lasting nine innings or more, on May 30 versus the A's at Oakland Coliseum. He allowed two total hits in a 5–1 Astros win. The last Astros pitcher to author a nine-inning complete game was Zack Greinke on June 4, 2021, versus Toronto. Alvarez homered twice, and Altuve also homered. On May 31, Chas McCormick hit a tie-breaking home run in the eighth inning versus starter Frankie Montas that resulted in a 3–1 Astros win. Entering the game in a 2-for-23 slump, McCormick also hit an RBI single in the fifth inning among three total hits.

==== June ====
The Astros won their fourth game in row on June 1. Justin Verlander took a no-hitter into the seventh inning, and Yordan Alvarez emptied the bases with a go-ahead double in the ninth as the Houston Astros defeated the Oakland Athletics, 5–4, to complete a three-game sweep. Elvis Andrus hit an RBI double to end Verlander's no-hit bit, tying the game at 1, and Christian Bethancourt succeeded with a two-run home run. Houston answered with four ninth inning runs, including a bases loaded double by Alvarez. Verlander received a no-decision and Bryan Abreu (3–0) produced a scoreless eighth inning. In the ninth, Andrus realized a second RBI double of the game to close the gap to one for the A's, but Ryan Pressly induced a groundout from Bethancourt that stranded the tying run at second base for his 10th save.

On June 2, the Astros agreed to a six-year contract extension with Alvarez worth $115 million; the deal bought out three remaining free-agent years that would keep him on the team until the 2028 season.

June 3–5 at Kansas City Royals: Houston won series, 2–1

On June 3, Yordan Alvarez, Aledmys Díaz and Martín Maldonado all homered to lead a 10–3 defeat of the Kansas City Royals for the Astros' fifth consecutive win. Alvarez added a pair of singles for his fifth straight multi-hit game. Díaz, who initiated the scoring with a two-run home in the second inning, also added two singles for his first three-hit effort of the season. Maldonado and Alvarez both hit two-run home runs in the fifth off Brady Singer (2–1), who surrendered eight hits and seven runs in five innings.

Salvador Pérez hit a two-run home versus Luis García (3–4) on June 4 to break a scoreless tie in the sixth and lead a 6–0 shutout of Houston. The Royals ended a five-game losing streak. Michael Brantley collected two of the Astros' five hits, who were shutout for the fifth time of the season.

On June 5, Alvarez hit his 16th home run and Valdez won his fifth consecutive start to close out the series with a 7–4 victory over the Royals. The home run, among three hits, traveled 456 feet (139 m) to right field, and extended a hitting streak to seven games. He hit .556 (15-for-27) in that span, including six multi-hit games. Valdez allowed four hits, three walks and two runs over six innings, and struck out five. He turned in a 2.11 ERA over his last six starts (10 earned runs in 42 2/3 innings). Closer Ryan Pressly was ejected in the ninth inning after throwing inside to Michael A. Taylor of the Royals.

For the week of May 30 to June 5, Alvarez batted .565/.630/1.217 with two walks, four home runs, eight RBI, and one strikeout in six games. He was named AL Player of the Week for the first time in his career on June 6.

June 6–8 vs Seattle Mariners: Seattle won series, 2–1

Astros reliever Héctor Neris dinged Mariners slugger Ty France in the back, and players and coaches from both sides began shouting at each other. Seattle manager Scott Servais rushed toward home plate and induced his team into a melee. The Astros met then, and both sides shoved and shouted — except for the 21-year-old rookie Julio Rodríguez, who wrapped up Neris and pulled him away from the scuffle. Rodríguez hit a two-run home run in the ninth moments after his manager was ejected as Seattle won the opener, 7–4. Justin Verlander (7–2) delivered 12 strikeouts over seven dominant innings on June 7 and Yordan Alvarez hit a two-run home run to lead a 4–1 Astros win.

Due to left elbow discomfort, the Astros placed left-handed reliever Parker Mushinski on the 15-day IL on June 7 and recalled Brandon Bielak from Sugar Land to replace him on the roster.

On June 8, starter José Urquidy (5–3) walked a career-high four batters and allowed seven hits and five runs–including home runs to Cal Raleigh and Ty France–over 4 1/3 innings. Seattle won, 6–3, for their first series win in Houston since 2018. Alvarez tallied three hits and two RBI for Houston.

June 13–15, at Texas Rangers: Houston won series, 2–1

Utility player Aledmys Díaz assumed duties as starting shortstop after rookie Jeremy Peña sustained a left thumb injury versus the Texas Rangers on June 13 and was placed on the injured list. At the time, Peña had batted .277 with six stolen bases; he led all MLB rookies with nine home runs, and led AL rookies in runs scored (27) and RBI (27).

On June 15, 2022, Luis Garcia and Phil Maton each pitched an immaculate inning versus the Rangers at Globe Life Field, striking out the same trio of Nathaniel Lowe, Ezequiel Durán, and Brad Miller in the second and seventh inning, respectively. This was the first time a major league game has seen at least two immaculate innings pitched, first by two teammates, and the first occurrence of more than one immaculate inning pitched on the same date in the major leagues. Martín Maldonado, the catcher for each of Houston's strikeouts – 14 in all – doubled and homered to help lead an offensive surge in a 9–2 Astros win. The immaculate innings were the eighth and ninth such occurrences in team history.

The Astros claimed outfielder Dillon Thomas off waivers from the Los Angeles Angels on June 15 and transferred center fielder Jake Meyers to the 60-day injured list. At the time, the team did not have a healthy position player available who was on the inactive 40-man roster.

Pitcher Forrest Whitley, once the top prospect in baseball, began a rehabilitation assignment on June 16 with the Florida Complex League (FCL) Astros. He delivered 38 pitches across two innings, allowed three runs and averaged 96 miles per hour (154 km/h) on his fastball versus the FCL Nationals. It was his first competition in professional baseball since September 2, 2019.

June 17–19, vs Chicago White Sox: Houston won series, 2–1

The Astros scored 10 runs in the sixth inning of a 13–3 win versus the Chicago White Sox on June 17, 2022, accounting for their highest-scoring frame since May 29, 2017. (Note: Houston scored 11 runs in the eighth inning versus the Minnesota Twins at Target Field on May 29, 2017.) The Astros batted 14 times in the sixth as Michael Brantley, Yordan Alvarez and Kyle Tucker each homered. Brantley's home run was a grand slam versus reliever Matt Foster, who had struck out the previous two batters with the bases loaded. Tucker extended a career-high hitting streak to 15 games. Alex Bregman and Yuli Gurriel, both mired in season-long slumps, added big contributions. Bregman (.214 batting average and .694 OPS entering the game) was 1-for-3 with a home run and two walks, and Gurriel (.218 average) was 3-for3 with a home run and two runs scored. On June 18, the White Sox defeated the Astros, 7–0, as they forced Verlander out after 3 2/3 innings and a season-high seven runs allowed, his shortest outing of the season. In the June 18 game, both Alvarez and Díaz left due to injury. Díaz left due to left shoulder discomfort in the fifth inning, and Alvarez injured himself while batting in the seventh inning. J. J. Matijevic, starting as the designated hitter, achieved his first major league hit—a home run—on June 19 versus Chicago White Sox starter Michael Kopech in the fourth inning, landing in the Crawford Box seats at Minute Maid Park, in a 4–3 Astros win. Mauricio Dubón started as the shortstop and hit his first home run in an Astros uniform.

June 21–22, vs New York Mets: Houston won series, 2–0

The New York Mets visited the Astros at Minute Maid Park on June 21–22 for a two-game set and the first of nine consecutive versus both New York clubs. On June 21, José Urquidy started for the Astros, recording six innings and reaching a career-high 104 pitches thrown as Houston prevailed, 8–3. He struck out Eduardo Escobar and J. D. Davis with the bases loaded to end the fourth inning. Jose Altuve hit a solo home run for the Astros. Entering the contest, the Mets had scored 5.04 runs per game, the highest in the National League. Alvarez homered three times during the Astros sweep of a two-game set versus the Mets. His 1.064 on-base plus slugging percentage (OPS) at the end of the second game led the major leagues, while his 21 home runs were tied with Mike Trout for second place. Bregman also homered in the second game, decided by a 5–3 score.

June 23–26, at New York Yankees: Houston split series with NYY, 2–2

In the Bronx, the Yankees defeated the Astros, 7–6, on June 23, scoring four runs in the bottom of the ninth inning, capped by Aaron Judge's walk-off single. In the first inning, the Astros' Alex Bregman and the Yankees' Giancarlo Stanton each exchanged three-run home runs. Alvarez followed with another three-run home run in the third inning versus Yankees starter Jameson Taillon. Entering the bottom of the ninth inning, the Astros led, 6–3. Aaron Hicks hit a three-run home run versus closer Ryan Pressly to tie it before Judge delivered the decisive hit.

On June 24, the Astros ended a Yankees' 15-home game winning streak, by a 3–1 score, behind Verlander's seven inning, one run performance. He allowed four hits and delivered nine of his 20 hardest-thrown fastballs on the season to date, averaging 95.5 miles per hour (153.7 km/h), up from 94.8 miles per hour (152.6 km/h) on his incoming season average. The lone Yankees run was a Stanton home run in the bottom of the sixth inning. Kyle Tucker hit a three-run home run in the top of the sixth inning to supply the Astros' offense. The Yankees drew a crowd of 47,528, to date a season-high.

The Astros activated Meyers from the 60-day injured list on June 24. To make room for him on both the active and 40-man rosters, the club optioned José Siri to Sugar Land, and designated Dillon Thomas for assignment.

The Astros combined to no-hit the Yankees on June 25, a 3–0 win led by starter Cristian Javier's seven innings. He set career highs with 13 strikeouts and 115 pitches. (Note: Javier's 13 strikeouts were the most by an Astros pitcher since Gerrit Cole struck out 14 on September 24, 2019.) Héctor Neris pitched the eighth inning, and Pressly closed out the ninth for his 15th save. It was the 14th no-hitter in Astros history, third combined no-hitter, and first no-hitter in the Bronx since June 11, 2003, an effort secured by six Houston pitchers. The Yankees' starting lineup featured two former Astros: Javier's counterpart Gerrit Cole, and at shortstop was Marwin González. Matijevic homered in the seventh inning for the Astros' first run, Altuve homered in the eighth, and Gurriel hit a pinch-hit RBI single in the ninth inning. The Astros are the only team to no-hit the Yankees at home since 1958. Martin Maldonado became the first player to catch more than one combined no-hitter in the major leagues; the previous combined no-hitter he had caught was for Houston on August 3, 2019. (Note: The no-hitter on June 25, 2022, was the 18th combined no-hitter in major league history. The pitchers who contributed no-hitter versus the Seattle Mariners were Aaron Sanchez, Will Harris, Joe Biagini, and Chris Devenski.)

The Astros activated SS Jeremy Peña (left thumb) from the injured list prior to the June 26 game. He doubled and scored on a Mauricio Dubón single and took away a hit from DJ LeMahieu in his first game back. Optioned to AAA was Chas McCormick.

In the series finale on June 26, Jose Altuve led the game off with a home run on the first pitch from Nestor Cortés for his seventh leadoff home run, tying him with ex-teammate George Springer for the league lead. Starting pitcher José Urquidy continued Houston's mastery, going to eight outs from a second consecutive no-hitter before Stanton hit a solo home run with one in the seventh. Urquidy left with the Astros leading, 3–1. Having pitched 16 1/3 consecutive hitless innings, the Astros staff tied an expansion-era record (since 1961) with the 1981 Astros versus the 1981 Dodgers lineup. (Note: Per the Elias Sports Bureau (ESB). Reliable data for individual innings is available starting in 1961. Astros manager Dusty Baker was an outfielder for the 1981 Dodgers. The 1973 Rangers and 1973 Twins also combined to hold the 1973 Athletics lineup hitless; however, the feat of an entire team going hitless in consecutive games remains unachieved in MLB annals. The Dodgers and A's won the World Series in those respective years.) In the eighth inning, LeMahieu homered versus Phil Maton to tie the game at three. In the top of the tenth inning, two Yankees miscues presented a big opportunity for the Astros. Catcher Jose Trevino's throw to second base to pick Jason Castro off found the base empty; he instead was on the move and stole third base. Shortstop Isiah Kiner-Falefa misplayed an Altuve ground ball to allow him on base. Michael King then walked Alex Bregman. However, the Astros could not capitalize as King (5–1) stranded the bases loaded. Judge walked off the Astros for the second time in four days, hitting the game-winning three-run home run in the bottom of the tenth inning versus Seth Martinez (0–1) for a 6–3 final score. Before the home run, Martinez had forged a 17 2/3-inning scoreless streak, second in the AL only to teammate Ryne Stanek's 19 1/3 innings.

Despite earning a split, the Yankees did not lead for a single inning in the four-game series against the Astros. An average of 45,176 fans attended per game, the highest for a series at Yankee Stadium since 45,675 when Cleveland visited in 2019.

June 28–29, at New York Mets: Houston won series, 2–0

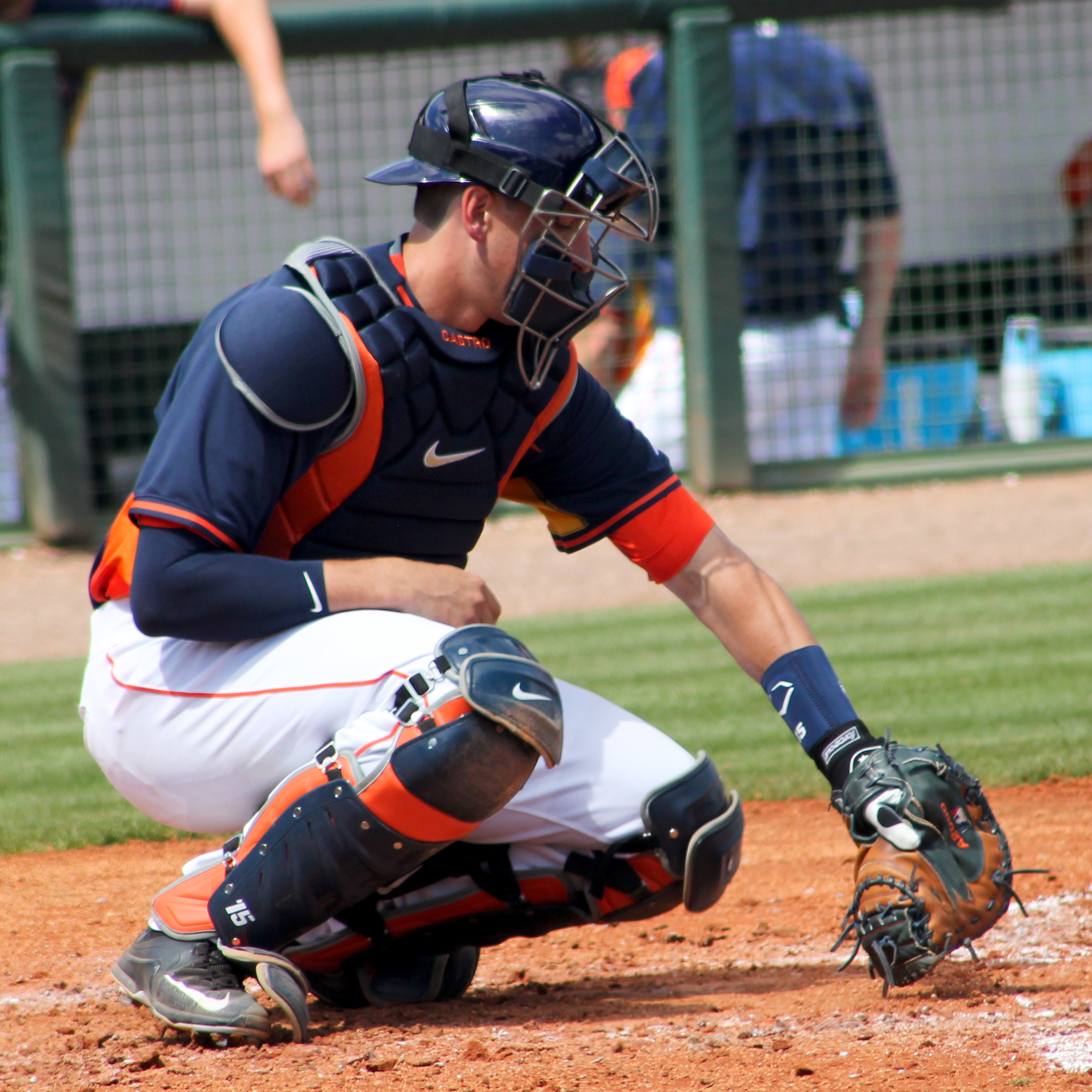
Jason Castro homered in his final major league at bat.

At Citi Field in Queens, New York, Kyle Tucker hit a three-run homer in the first inning to back Framber Valdez' eight shutout innings as Houston prevailed, 9–1. Yordan Alvarez hit his 23rd home run among three total hits and two walks. Yuli Gurriel also homered and Alex Bregman had three hits. Tucker led off the fourth inning with 12-pitch walk, then stole his 14th base, and scored on a Jake Meyers single. Valdez allowed six hits, struck out four and induced 12 ground ball outs. Astros right-hander Enoli Paredes, pitching the ninth inning for his first outing of the year with Houston, gave up the shoutout. He was assisted by a stellar catch from left fielder Chas McCormick, who snagged a foul pop-up over the railing in foul territory from Eduardo Escobar. Paredes then walked James McCann with two outs and the bases loaded. Mets starter Carlos Carrasco struggled in a second straight start versus Houston, allowing six runs, six hits, and three walks in 4 1/3 innings. Michael Brantley was placed on the 10-day injured list for right shoulder discomfort; McCormick and Paredes were recalled from Sugar Land.

Justin Verlander was the starting pitcher and Jason Castro the starting catcher for the finale against the Mets on June 29. The Astros hurled a shutout, winning 2–0, with Verlander (10–3) tallying eight of the innings and Pressly closing out the ninth inning for his 16th save. Verlander became the first pitcher in 2022 to reach double-figures in wins and turned in the fourth-lowest ERA (2.03) in the sport. In the eighth inning, Peña collided Alvarez while running for a Dominic Smith shallow fly ball; both men left the game. Alvarez laid on the ground for several moments before being carted off the field. The game remained scoreless until the ninth inning. In the top of the ninth inning, Castro, facing reliever Drew Smith, hit his first home run of the season with Gurriel on base to put the Astros ahead, 2–0.

June 30, vs New York Yankees: Houston won series, 1–0

The Astros got ahead of the Yankees early at Minute Maid Park after a two-run double from Alex Bregman. Luis García (6–5) hurled 5 1/2 innings for the Astros, allowing three hits and one run with six strikeouts. Jake Meyers doubled to lead off the bottom half of the third inning. Aledmys Díaz and Kyle Tucker drew consecutive walks with two outs, loading the bases. Bregman's double scored Meyers and Díaz and Tucker reached third. With Yuli Gurriel batting, Yankees starter Luis Severino removed his PitchCom device and held the speaker to his ear, apparently unable to hear Jose Trevino's signals. Tucker, noting that Severino was distracted, raced toward home plate. Still holding the PitchCom device in his right hand, and ballcap in his left, Severino maneuvered to free his right hand and threw to Trevino, who narrowly tagged Tucker out to end the inning. Anthony Rizzo hit a solo home run for the Yankees in the sixth inning, but the Astros held on to win, 2–1.

Alvarez named Player of the Month. Yordan Alvarez won the American League (AL) Player of the Month Award for June, his first (previously, he had won three AL Rookie of the Month Awards in 2019). Over 23 games, he batted .418/.510/.835/1.346, garnering four doubles, one triple, nine home runs, and 28 RBI. He led the league in batting, on-base percentage, slugging percentage, on-base plus slugging percentage (OPS), and RBI, and ranked fourth in the AL in home runs. He posted an equal number of bases on balls (BB) and strikeouts (SO)—13.

==== July ====
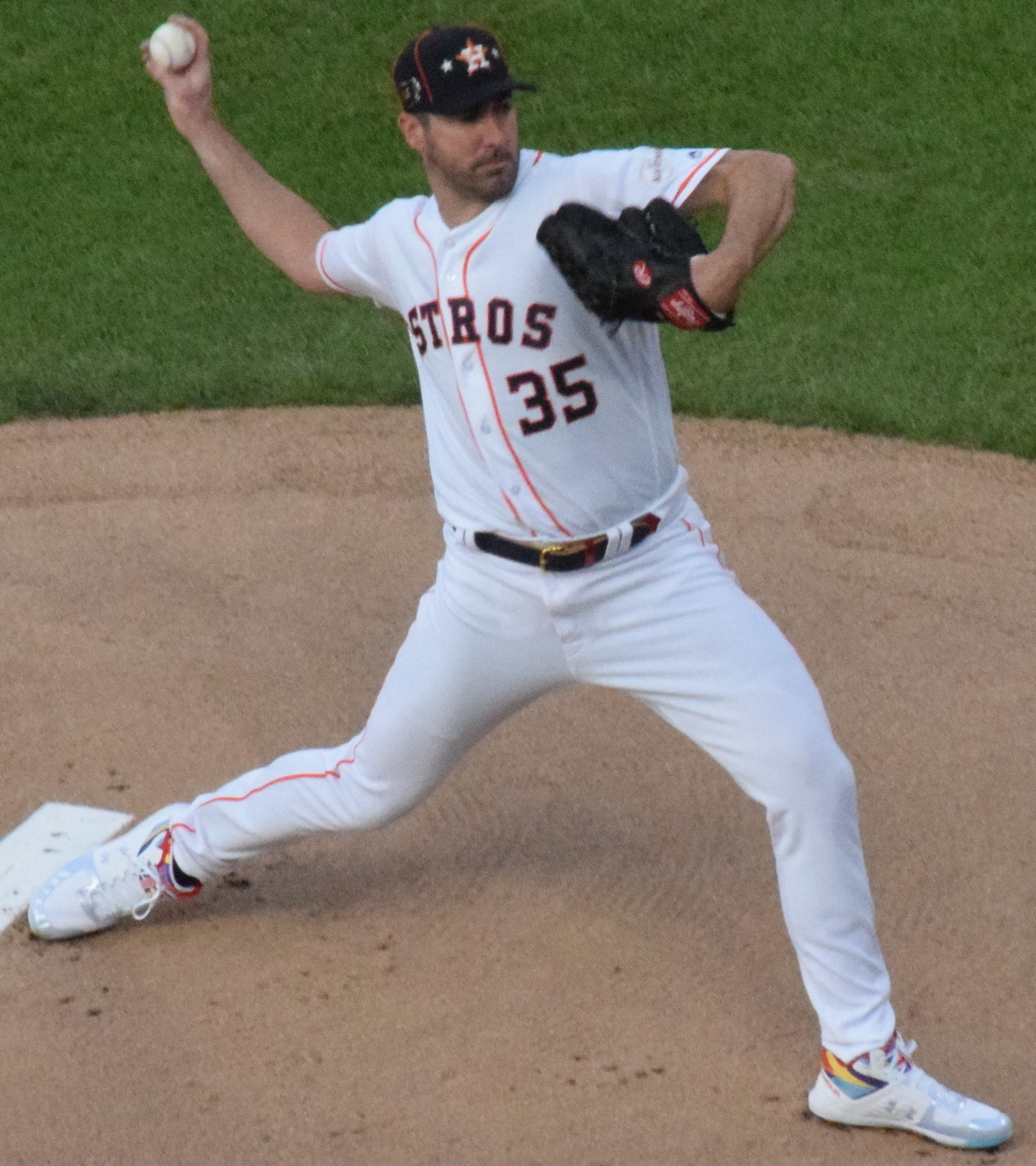
Justin Verlander was an All-Star and the American League Cy Young winner in 2022.

Following a left knee injury to Jason Castro, the Astros selected the contract of catcher Korey Lee from AAA Sugar Land on July 1, 2022, and promoted him to the major league roster that day. Castro was placed on the 10-day IL.

July 1–3 vs Los Angeles Angels: Houston won series, 3–0

Cristian Javier, making his first start since the combined no-hitter, threw seven innings and allowed one run on one hit, striking out 14 in an 8–1 Astros win. A home run to Shohei Ohtani in the first inning was the only baserunner that Javier (6–3) allowed aboard. The 14 strikeouts established another new career high, and the 27 counting those from the previous start made Javier the only pitcher in the modern era to achieve that number of strikeouts in a span of two starts while allowing one or fewer hits. He was the fourth pitcher in franchise history to attain 13 or more strikeouts in consecutive starts, and the first since Gerrit Cole in 2019. In the sixth inning, Chas McCormick made a key leaping catch in front of the left field wall to rob Andrew Velazquez of a hit. Yuli Gurriel, McCormick, and Jake Meyers all homered off Michael Lorenzen (6–6) to harangue him eight runs within the first three innings.

The Astros scored six runs in the third inning. Tyler Wade's throwing error allowed leadoff hitter Jeremy Peña to reach base, Kyle Tucker singled and Alex Bregman hit a sacrifice fly to score Peña and make it 3–1. Gurriel walked, J. J. Matijevic hit a double, Meyers singled home Tucker, and McCormick homered, extending the lead to 8–1.

Peña returned after missing the previous contest versus the Yankees following the outfield collision with Alvarez on June 29, who remained out of play on July 1. Lee made his major league debut in the eighth inning as a pinch hitter for Martín Maldonado and was retired to on popup.

On July 2, catcher Martín Maldonado, second baseman Jose Altuve, and starter José Urquidy led a 9–1 rout of Los Angeles as Houston delivered their 50th win of the season. Maldonado homered twice, Altuve homered, doubled twice, and stole a base, and Urquidy (7–3) allowed one run on two hits while striking out eight over six innings. Kyle Tucker and Chas McCormick also homered for Houston. The fifth straight win for the Astros, it was also the fifth consecutive contest in which they allowed one run or fewer. In the fourth inning, Maldonado and Altuve struck back-to-back home runs. Alvarez returned as the designated hitter after missing two games due to the collision in the outfield, going 0-for-4 with a walk.

The Astros concluded the series with Los Angeles establishing a number of records and personal bests on the way to a 4–2 win, led by Peña, Framber Valdez, and Altuve. Peña produced both his first career four-hit and multi-homer game, as well as the rookie's second career walk-off home run. With a 2-all score, two outs, and Altuve aboard in the bottom of the ninth, Peña homered off Ryan Tepera (1–2). Altuve appeared in his 1,500th career game and forged three hits. Valdez produced his 13th consecutive quality start, while reaching a career-high with 13 strikeouts, among five walks. Twelve consecutive outs Valdez produced were via strikeout, supplanting the franchise record of nine previously accomplished by Don Wilson, Randy Johnson, and Gerrit Cole (twice). Further, the Astros struck out a franchise record 20 batters over a nine-inning game. Héctor Neris struck out two in the seventh, Rafael Montero two in the eighth, and Ryan Pressly (2–2) retired the side on strikeouts in the ninth. Per STATS, the Astros become the first team in major league history to record 48 strikeouts over a three-game series without playing extra innings.

July 4–7 vs Kansas City Royals: Houston won series, 3–1

Jake Odorizzi was activated from the injured list on July 4 after missing 42 games to start against the Kansas City Royals. As they had one off day prior to the All-Star break starting July 18, the Astros shifted to a 6-man starting rotation. Enoli Paredes was optioned to make room for Odorizzi.

Despite having won only once in just 12 times when their opponents scored first, the Astros made their biggest comeback of the season. After trailing by five runs in opener versus the Royals, Alvarez provided a second consecutive walk-off. Starting pitcher Jake Odorizzi struggled with command, unable to get ahead of hitters, to induce swings and misses, or weak contact. The Astros found themselves in a 5–0 deficit after three innings. MJ Melendez homered twice for Kansa City, including once versus Odorizzi, whose afternoon concluded after four innings and 90 pitches. Houston starters had yielded a 0.67 ERA and the staff 10 earned runs overall in the previous ten contests. The Astros scored once each in the fourth, fifth and seventh innings. In the eighth, Royals reliever Amir Garrett walked two of three batters he faced before both runners scored on a Kyle Tucker single to center field. Taylor Clarke then relieved Garrett, who yielded a slowly-hit ground ball to Yuli Gurriel that snuck through the Kansas City infield to score Tucker and tie the game at 6. Alvarez launched a fastball from Scott Barlow for a solo home run 444 feet (135 m) in the bottom of the ninth inning, giving the Astros a 7–6 victory.

On July 5, the Astros won their eighth consecutive contest, 9–7. Former Astros standout Zack Greinke, now pitching for the Royals, was honored with a video tribute before the game. Astros batters got ten hits and six runs over five innings against him, including home runs from Bregman and Peña in the fifth inning. Aledmys Díaz got three hits and a two-run home run off reliever Jackson Kowar. Alvarez turned his first career double play and hit his 25th home run. Entering the eighth inning, Houston held an 8–5 lead. The Astros infield appeared to have turned a routine double play, but the Royals challenged, contending that Jose Altuve failed to touch second base to eliminate the lead runner and his throw to first was late. After review, the call on both outs was overturned, and the Royals were then positioned with runners on first and second with no outs. After Houston reliever Bryan Abreu walked home a run, he was removed in favor of Phil Maton, which resulted in Nicky Lopez hitting a fly ball to Alvarez in left field. Alvarez rifled the ball home to Maldonado on a 92.5 miles per hour (148.9 km/h) carom, who applied the tag to Hunter Dozier racing for home in time for the out. Rafael Montero pitched the ninth for his sixth save.

The Royals homered three times off Cristian Javier (6–4) on July 6 en route to 7–4 win to terminate the Astros' eight-game winning streak. Whit Merrifield, the leadoff hitter, homered on the third pitch of the game, and Hunter Dozier and Emmanuel Rivera also connected versus Javier. It was his first loss since June 6 and the three home runs allowed tied a career high. In the sixth inning, Díaz homered in a second straight game for Houston.

The Astros concluded the mathematical first half of their season with a 53–28 record, including 26–12 at home.

Houston won the final game of the series versus Kansas City, 5–2, behind Justin Verlander's (11–3) six innings and two runs, pushing further his AL-leading win total. Martín Maldonado led the offense with a double among three total hits and one walk, Altuve (17) and Alvarez (26) both homered, and Altuve drive n three including Maldonado after his double. Verlander, who allowed seven hits and one earned run over six innings, struck out eight. Continuing an impressing return from Tommy John surgery, his ERA to shrunk to 2.00; his ERA, opponent average (.190) and WHIP (0.97) all ranked second in the AL. Dusty Baker (2,041) took over sole possession of ninth place in wins among managers, passing Walter Alston.

July 8–10 at Oakland Athletics: Houston won series, 2–1

With MLB All-Star starters announced, Altuve was named starter at second base for the American League. It was his eight selection overall, and fifth as a starter, both franchise records. He led AL second basemen in on-base percentage (.368), slugging percentage (.539) OPS (.907) and home runs (17). Craig Biggio (seven) previously held the record for most appearances. Dusty Baker, by rule of having been manager of the Astros in the 2021 World Series, was named manager of the American League.

On July 8, José Urquidy started the series opener versus Oakland and reached a career high eight innings in an 8–3 win. Urquidy (8–3) was charged with all three runs, and, over his last 27 innings, had allowed six to score to lower his ERA from 4.99 to 4.08. Alex Bregman and Martín Maldonado both homered for Houston, Yuli Gurriel stroked three base hits and every starter in the lineup mustered at least one hit for 14 total hits. A's starter Paul Blackburn (6–4) retired the first 10 Astros batters allowing consecutive one-out doubles to Díaz and Alvarez.

Limited to four hits on July 9 for the fourth consecutive game, Oakland held on to defeat Houston, 3–2, largely behind a solid effort from left-handed starter Zach Logue. Logue held the Astros to two hits over his five innings, including retiring the final ten batters he faced. Framber Valdez (8–4), who last hurled a complete game versus Oakland on May 30, repeated the effort, this time on the losing end for Houston. He matched Sandy Alcántara of the Marlins as the only pitchers to have tossed two complete games for the season thus far in the major leagues.

Four more Astros were named to the All-Star team per MLB's unveiling of the reserves and pitching staffs on July 10. Verlander received his ninth overall selection, and the trio of Alvarez, Tucker, and Valdez were named for the first time. Alvarez was leading the major leagues in OPS (1.058) and third in home runs (26). Valdez put together a stellar first half with an ERA (2.64) second on the Astros' staff to only Verlander (2.00). Tucker batted .259 with 16 home runs, ranked fourth in the AL in RBI (58) and tied for fifth in steals (14). He garnered 10 Defensive Runs Saved, per Fangraphs, tied with Brett Phillips for the lead among AL outfielders. Per STATS, LLC, Verlander became the first pitcher in history to have reached or exceeded the following as of an All-Star break: 2.00 ERA, 12 wins, .800 winning percentage, .200 batting average against, 0.900 WHIP, and a strikeout-to-walk ratio of 5.00.

Due to lingering right hand inflammation, the Astros placed Yordan Alvarez on the 10-day injured list. Stemming from an injury that occurred while swinging versus the White Sox on June 18, he subsequently missed time but the condition had become “progressively worse,” commented manager Dusty Baker. It precluded him from participating in the All-Star Game. The Astros called up José Siri from AAA Sugar Land to take Alvarez' place on the active roster.

Starting pitcher Jake Odorizzi delivered seven stellar innings on July 10, Korey Lee achieved his first three major league hits and RBI, and Kyle Tucker hit his 17th home run as Houston cruised to a 6–1 win. It was their 11th win in 13 games. In the fifth inning, Lee hit a soft single through the infield to score Jake Meyers for his first hit and RBI. Lee added a two-run double in the seventh and singled to lead off the ninth. Odorizzi (4–2) threw seven scoreless innings and struck out a season-high seven.

July 12–14 at Los Angeles Angels: Houston won series, 2–1

On July 12, Kyle Tucker hit a tie-breaking RBI double in the ninth inning to deliver a 6–5 win. The win gave the Astros four wins in five games, and 21 of 27, moving the club to a season-high 28 games above .500 at 57–29. Aledmys Díaz hit an early two-run home run and Alex Bregman and Altuve hit RBI singles. In spite of Luis García's six scoreless innings, the bullpen and defense allowed four to score in the seventh, with Phil Maton being charged four unearened runs. Hector Neris (2–3) navigated the eighth, and Ryan Pressly closed it for his 19th save. García's one hit allowed was a career-best through his first 45 major league starts. His sixth quality start of the season, it was the 17th consecutive produced on the road by Houston pitching. Per an AT&T SportsNet broadcast, the quality start extended the longest streak franchise history, exceeding the 1972 club (14).

The Angels won on July 13, 7–1, largely behind the effort of Shohei Ohtani, who hurled six strong innings and hit a two-run triple. Winning his sixth straight start (9–4), Ohtani struck out 12. Cristian Javier lasted just 3 2/3 innings, allowing three runs with 10 strikeouts. It was the first double-digit strikeout effort with less than four innings completed by a starting pitcher since Cleveland's Danny Salazar in 2014. Combining for 32 strikeouts, Houston (15) and Los Angeles (17) set an American League record.

In the first inning on July 14, Jose Altuve left the game after being hit by the first pitch from Reid Detmers. The next three Houston batters also reached base, who took a 2–0 lead on a Kyle Tucker single. In the tenth inning, Jeremy Peña's single scored automatic runner Korey Lee for a 3–2 score. Ryan Pressley (3–2), who pitched both the ninth and tenth innings, struck out Brandon Marsh with the tying run on third base in the tenth to end the contest.

July 15–17 vs Oakland Athletics: Oakland won series, 2–1

A three-run home run from Skye Bolt and Cole Irvin's (4–7) six sharp innings helped lead a 5–1 Oakland win over Houston in the series opener. José Urquidy (8–4), who had won three straight decisions, took the loss. He allowed six hits and three runs, striking out nine over 6 1/3 innings. Offensively, the Astros connected for four hits, and were held hitless until Alex Bregman singled with two outs in the fourth.

On July 16, Houston won, 5–0, behind Verlander's six scoreless innings and one inning each from Phil Maton, Héctor Neris, and Bryan Abreu. Martín Maldonado hit a grand slam, and Jose Altuve, starting at designated hitter after missing one game, stroked a single. With two outs in the second inning, Yuli Gurriel and Jake Meyers hit consecutive singles before Chas McCormick walked to load the bases, and Maldonado followed with his drive versus rookie Jared Koenig (1–3). Verlander (12–5) upped his major league-league leading win total while dropping his ERA to 1.89, which ranked third in the major leagues. His 10 strikeouts pushed his career total to 3,121, moving him to 14th all time, passing Curt Schilling (3,116) and Bob Gibson (3,117).

Stephen Vogt hit a tie-breaking single in the eighth inning to lead 4–3 win versus the Astros on July 17. Tucker and Peña homered for Houston, who finished their All-Star break first half at 59–32, the second-best record in the AL. Pressly, who struck out the side in the ninth inning, tied the Astros' franchise record with 27 consecutive batters retired first achieved by Dave Giusti in 1965. Pressly's streak occurred over eight straight outings.

July 21 vs New York Yankees ×2: Houston won series, 2–0

On July 21, the Astros activated Yordan Alvarez and Parker Mushinski from the 10- and 15-day injured lists, respectively, moved Ryan Pressly to the paternity list, and optioned José Siri to Sugar Land.

The New York Yankees visited the Astros for a July 21 doubleheader, just the third played at the domed Minute Maid Park since it opened in 2000. The doubleheader games were makeup games for part of the June 30 series that was postponed as a consequence of the lockout. In the bottom of the ninth inning of the first game, pinch hitter J. J. Matijevic hit a walk-off infield single with the bases loaded to score Alex Bregman for a 3–2 win. Cristian Javier, on the mound against New York since starting the combined no-hitter on June 25, tied his season high with four walks allowed with one run over five innings. Yordan Alvarez returned to the starting lineup in the second game, greeting Domingo Germán (0–1), who made his season debut, with a home run in the first inning. The next hitter, Alex Bregman, also homered as the two sluggers combined for five RBI. The Astros won, 7–5, to sweep the doubleheader and win the season series, 5–2. Per ESPN Stats and Info, the Yankees hit .151 (33-for-229) in the seven games versus Astros pitching, the lowest mark in franchise history with at least five games played against one opponent in a single season. New York had the best record in baseball and were on pace to win 110 games.

July 22–24 at Seattle Mariners: Houston won series, 3–0

The Houston Astros opened a series at T-Mobile Park by snapping the Mariners' 14-game winning streak, and Jose Altuve, Yordan Alvarez, Martín Maldonado all homered in a 5–2 score. It was one win short of the longest in Mariners' franchise history, accomplished during their historic 2001 campaign. Starter José Urquidy (9–4), who allowed one run on four hits over six innings, had previously been batted around for 27 hits and 15 earned runs in 13 innings opposing Seattle for a 10.38 ERA. Entering the eight with the bases loaded and tying run aboard, Ryne Stanek closed out the inning and extended a personal scoreless inning streak to 27. A season-high 45,290 fans were in attendance. Justin Verlander became the majors' first 13-game winner on July 23 behind seven innings of one-run ball to lead a 3–1 win, winning his fifth start in a row, while lowering his ERA to 1.86, second in the majors to Tampa Bay's Shane McClanahan (1.71). Both Yuli Gurriel and Kyle Tucker hit RBI doubles in the fourth inning. Bryan Abreu finished off the last three outs for his first save on the season. In the final game of the series, Altuve and Jeremy Peña led off the game with back-to-back home runs versus Robbie Ray (8–7), leading to an 8–5 victory. It was Altuve's major-league leading eighth leadoff home run. Martín Maldonado drove in three on two hits, and Framber Valdez (9–4) carried a shutout into the seventh inning. Ryan Pressly retired three batters faced in the ninth to establish a new Houston club record among relievers for consecutive batters retired, at 30.

July 25–27 at Oakland Athletics: Oakland won series, 3–0

Former Astro Tony Kemp homered versus Jake Odorizzi (4–3) as Adam Oller (1–3) earned his first major league win in a 7–5 Oakland victory on July 25. Odorizzi, 4–0 in seven previous starts, yielded the home run to Kemp in the third inning while a blister on his pitching hand began to develop. Jeremy Peña homered in the first inning for Houston, who had won five in a row in the since the All-Star break, and were an AL-leading 28–10 since June 12. Chad Pinder hit his second grand slam in two weeks as the A's held on to defeat the Astros, 5–3, on July 26. Kyle Tucker hit his 19th home run and Yordan Alvarez collected two hits for the Astros. The A's also won the series' final game on July 27, 4–2, for their first sweep of the season. Alvarez hit his 29th home of the season. Tony Kemp tallied another strong game, collecting three hits and one RBI. The sweep upped the A's AL-worst record to 38–63 but they had won six of eight versus the AL West-leading Astros (64–35).

July 28–31 vs Seattle Mariners: Houston won series, 3–1

Alex Bregman connected for a two-run home run and added an RBI double in the eighth inning to help lead Houston to a 4–2 win versus the Mariners on July 28. Rafael Montero (4–1) recorded four perfect outs and Ryan Pressly architected a scoreless ninth for a 21st save in 24 chances. Pressly retired the first two batters before J. P. Crawford singled to reach 32 consecutive hitters retired, a streak that tied Justin Verlander (2019) for most in Astros history among all pitchers. Verlander (14–3) took one-run ball into the eighth inning on July 29 en route to an 11–1 win over Seattle. Yuli Gurriel and Yordan Alvarez stroked consecutive singles in the fourth before Bregman hit a two-run double for a 4–0 lead to chase Mariners starter Robbie Ray (8–8). Aledmys Díaz homered twice, and Alvarez and Mauricio Dubón also homered. The 240th win of Verlander's career, it moved him into a tie with Frank Tanana for 56th all-time. Alvarez, who was 3-for-3, established a team record by reaching 30 home runs in the fewest appearances, doing so in his 84th game of the season.

Former Astro Abraham Toro delivered a pinch-hit two-run single in the ninth inning on July 30 versus Pressly (3–3) to rally Seattle to a 5–4 victory. It was Pressly's first blown save since June 23 versus New York, and fourth in 25 chances in 2022. Díaz again homered, finishing 3-for-3 with two RBI and one walk. Framber Valdez allowed three runs on five hits, walked one and struck out seven over seven innings. It was his majors-leading 18th quality start, and 17th consecutive, the second-most in Astros history. On July 31, Yordan Alvarez delivered a single to drive in Jose Altuve in the bottom of the tenth for the 3−2, game-winning run. Jake Odorizzi delivered seven shutout innings for a game score of 79, allowing just two hits and one walk while establishing a season-high of eight strikeouts. In the first inning, Altuve stole home on a double steal as Gurriel took second for the Astros' first run, and Kyle Tucker singled home Gurriel for the second run.

==== August ====
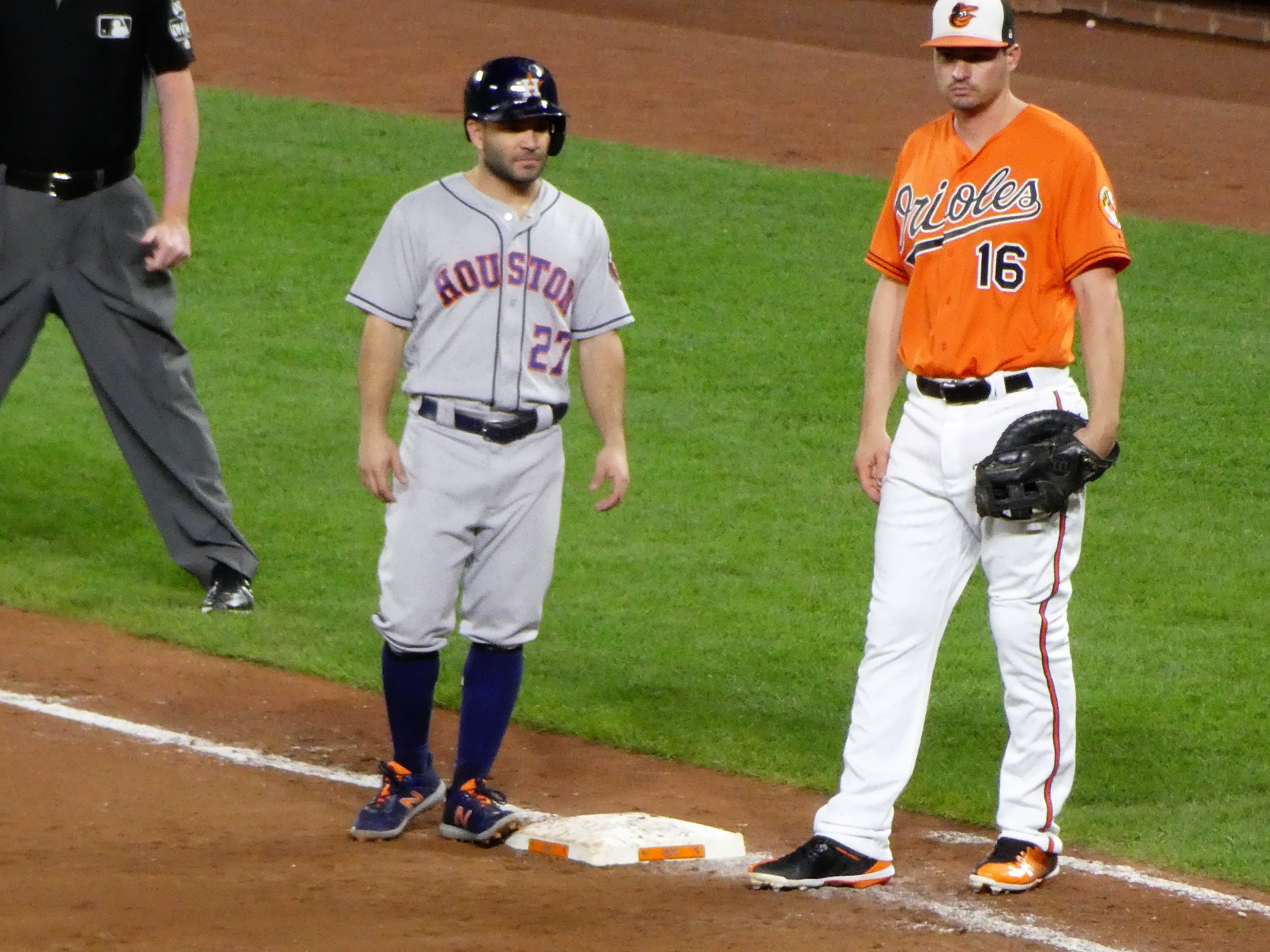
Jose Altuve (left) and Trey Mancini in 2018 when Mancini was a member of the Baltimore Orioles

Trade deadline transactions

On August 1, the Astros acquired Baltimore Orioles first baseman and outfielder Trey Mancini in a trhee-team trade that also involved the Tampa Bay Rays, from whom they received pitcher Jayden Murray. Baltimore received Seth Johnson from Tampa Bay, and pitcher Chayce McDermott from the Astros. Houston sent outfielder José Siri to Tampa Bay . Houston also traded on August 1 minor league players Enmanuel Valdez and Wilyer Abreu to the Boston Red Sox to acquire catcher Christian Vázquez.

August 1–3 vs Boston Red Sox: Boston won series, 2–1

Jarren Duran homered and collected three runs batted in (RBI) on August 1 to lead a 3–2 Red Sox win. Nate Eovaldi (5–3) rebounded from a loss versus Houston on May 17, in which he allowed a record-tying five home runs in one inning. He recorded 6 1/3 innings, allowing no earned runs and four hits with six strikeouts. The Astros acquired Red Sox catcher Christian Vázquez during this game's pregame phase. On August 2, Rafael Devers homered in a return from the injured list to power the Red Sox to a 2–1 win. Starter Cristian Javier (6–7) worked six innings, yielding four hits and two runs and striking out seven, in his fourth straight loss. New acquisitions Vázquez and Trey Mancini both made their Astros debuts as pinch hitters in ninth inning. Catcher Jason Castro had surgery on the left knee and was ruled out for the remainder of the season. Trey Mancini went deep for his first hit as an Astro on August 3 to help lead a 6–1 win. José Urquidy (10–4) spun 7 scoreless innings, delivered a game score of 83 and tied his career high of 10 strikeouts. Reliever Will Smith, making his Astros debut, allowed a solo home run in an otherwise clean ninth inning. Vázquez made his first start as catcher for Houston. Jose Altuve, who crafted the 34th four-hit game of his career, tied Craig Biggio for most in team history.

August 4–7 at Cleveland Guardians: Houston split series with CLE, 2–2

On August 4, Justin Verlander (15–3) pitched six scoreless innings to increase an MLB-leading win total, and Chas McCormick and Martín Maldonado both homered with three RBI as Houston took the opener in Cleveland, 6–0. Mancini homered twice on August 5, including his first career grand slam, and drove in five runs to lead a 9–3 win over the Guardians. Jose Altuve added three hits, a double, and an RBI for Houston. On August 6, Cal Quantrill (8–5) tossed six scoreless innings to remain undefeated at Progressive Field (11–0 in 26 career starts) as the Guardians breezed past the Astros, 4–1. Aledmys Díaz started at shortstop and doubled twice, driving in Houston's lone run in the ninth. On August 7, Triston McKenzie (8~8, game score 85) tossed eight scoreless innings and catcher Luke Maile hit his first home run since May 20, 2019, as the Guardians handed Houston their 7th shutout loss of the season, 1~0. Cristian Javier (6~8, game score 60) lost a fifth straight decision for the Astros, going six innings while allowing six hits, allowing the solo home run to Maile, and striking out four.

August 9–11 vs Texas Rangers: Houston won series, 2–1

The Astros halted Martín Pérez' nine-game winning streak (9–3), tagging him for seven runs, including a game-tying grand slam from Aledmys Díaz, helping to result in a 7–5 win on August 9. José Urquidy (11–4) earned a third consecutive win in spite of allowing five runs and a season-tying high of three home runs. Leody Taveras hit a bases-clearing double in the tenth inning on August 10 versus Phil Maton (0–2) to lead an 8–4 Rangers victory. Kyle Tucker and Yordan Alvarez both hit solo home runs for Houston. On August 11, Framber Valdez (11–4) notched a major-league leading 19th consecutive quality start, and second-longest in franchise history to lead a 7–3 victory over Texas. Alex Bregman and Martín Maldonado homered and drove in three runs each, and Yuli Gurriel broke an 0-for-12 slump with three hits to tie his season high.

August 12–14 vs Oakland Athletics: Houston won series, 3–0

Outfielder Michael Brantley was ruled out for the rest of the season on August 12, having undergone right shoulder surgery. In the midst of another excellent season, his .370 on-base percentage ranked second on the team at the time of the surgery.

Kyle Tucker hit a grand slam versus reliever Sam Moll (1–2) in a six-run fifth inning on August 12 versus Oakland to rally Houston from a 2–0 deficit, catalyzing in a 7–5 Astros win. Starter Luis García (9–8) hurled six innings with six strikeouts, allowing four runs on eight hits. He snapped a three-game losing streak after the Astros' lineup had scored three runs or fewer in each of those starts. Reliever Héctor Neris threw a scoreless ninth for his second save. On August 13, Lance McCullers Jr. made his season debut and earned the win versus the A's (1–0, game score 69). He hurled six shutout innings, allowed two hits, walked four, and struck out five. Alex Bregman homered, Trey Mancini collected three hits, and Tucker and Chas McCormick both stroked an RBI triple for Houston.

Astros Hall of Fame induction. On August 13, former outfielder Terry Puhl and former executive Tal Smith were inducted into the Astros Hall of Fame during a pregame ceremony.

Uvalde shooting victims honored. Prior to the August 14 game versus Oakland, the Astros chartered 10 buses to transport approximately 500 family members and friends of the victimes of the Robb Elementary School shooting on May 24, 2022, in Uvalde, Texas. In a pregame event, the group met with Dusty Baker, Jose Altuve, Bregman and McCullers, who each spoke and answered questions. The Astros also distributed 2,500 additional free tickets to residents of Ulvade and held fundraisers where all proceeds went to those affected by the shooting. During the game, Astros starter Cristian Javier hurled six shutout innings, allowing one hit and three walks while striking out six, as the Astros prevailed, 5–3. Over his previous six outings, Javier had gone 0–5 with a 4.40 ERA. Bregman hit a two-run home run in the first inning for the second consecutive day, and Altuve added two RBI. Christian Vázquez produced his first three-hit game as an Astro.

August 15–18 at Chicago White Sox: Houston split series with CHI, 2–2

On August 15, the White Sox defeated Houston 4–2 largely behind a masterful effort by starter Johnny Cueto. A four-run eighth inning sunk Houston predicated on a rare collapse by Houston reliever Rafael Montero (4–2), charged three of the runs without having recorded an out. Astros starter José Urquidy threw 7 2/3 hitless innings and was removed after A. J. Pollock got the first hit for Chicago. On August 16, the Astros ended a record 14 consecutive starts of one run or fewer allowed by Dylan Cease, who yielded three runs in five innings. Gavin Sheets hit a game-tying two-run double off Justin Verlander in the seventh inning. Yoán Moncada drove in the go-ahead run in the eighth for the second consecutive night, this time versus Héctor Neris (4–4). Chicago won, 4–3. The Astros won 3–2 on August 17 after having blown late-inning leads the prior two games. Framber Valdez (12–4) delivered seven innings of two-run ball for his 20th consecutive quality start on August 17, tying Mike Scott's club record established during his Cy Young-winning season in 1986. Yordan Alvarez led the way offensively, scoring a run and driving in another. The Astros concluded their season series with Chicago winning 21–5, spearheaded by Alex Bregman's two home runs, two doubles and six RBI. The 21 runs tied for second-most in franchise history. Bregman, Kyle Tucker, and Christian Vázquez each tied their career high with four hits. Chas McCormick, who tallied five RBI, and Trey Mancini, also homered for Houston. The Astros totaled 25 hits, tying the franchise record. (Note: It was the club's largest scoring output since a club-record 23 on August 10, 2019, versus the Baltimore Orioles, tying for second-most in franchise history. The team also collected 25 hits in the same 2019 contest versus Baltimore.)

August 19–21 at Atlanta Braves: Atlanta won series, 2–1

The Astros dropped the first game of a rematch of the 2021 World Series, 6–2, to the Atlanta Braves at Truist Park. Slugger Yordan Alvarez left in the fifth inning due to an episode of shortness of breath and his replacement, Mauricio Dubón, exited an inning later after crashing into the outfield wall while tracking a Dansby Swanson fly ball. On August 20, Cristian Javier hurled six innings of two-hit and one-run ball with eight strikeouts for a game score of 71. Jeremy Peña hit a first-inning home run and drove in the go-ahead run in the top of the 11th inning. The Braves won in the bottom of the 11th, 5–4.

On August 20, the Astros selected infielder David Hensley's contract to promote him to the major leagues.

Former Astro Charlie Morton struck out 11 on August 21, just the third starter in 2022 to strike out double-figures in Astros hitters, following Shohei Ohtani and Kevin Gausman. Astros starter José Urquidy (12–4) allowed two runs over seven solid innings, striking out six, as Houston won the finale, 5–4. The Astros had won 15 of his last 20 starts, and over his last 11, Urquidy was 7–1 with a 2.48 ERA. Alvarez returned to play after a one-game absence, collecting two hits and an RBI, and scored the go-ahead run in the eighth when Kyle Tucker singled.

August 23–25 vs Minnesota Twins: Houston won series, 3–0

On August 23, Justin Verlander left a no-hitter intact after six innings with 10 strikeouts on the way to extending a major-league leading 16 wins to lead a 4–2 victory over Minnesota. Ryne Stanek allowed the first hit to former Astro Carlos Correa in the top of the seventh, who received a warm and lengthy ovation from the Houston crowd in a return during his first at bat. It was Verlandfer's second no-hit try versus the Twins on the season; in May, he lost a no-hit bid after eight innings. Alex Bregman's home run provided insurance for a 4–0 lead. Yordan Alvarez collected a single in front his family, who had just left Cuba and saw him play professionally for the first time. Framber Valdez (13–4) authored a new franchise record 21st-consecutive quality start on August 24 versus the Twins, allowing two hits and one run in seven innings and getting eight strikeouts to lead a 5–3 Astros win. On August 25, the Astros defeated the Twins 6–3 with a solid outing by Luis García, who gave up 3 runs in 5 innings while striking out five Twins batters. On the other side of the ball, Trey Mancini hit a 3 run homer which ended up being the difference in the game as Twins starter Chris Archer allowed 5 runs in 4 innings. The Astros swept not only this series from Minnesota but also swept the season series outright.

August 26–28 vs Baltimore Orioles: Baltimore won series, 2–1

On August 26, Orioles rookie starter Kyle Bradish (2–5) allowed just two hits over eight brilliant innings to lead an Orioles' shutout of the Astros, 2–0. A two-run home run in the sixth inning by catcher Ramón Urías provided all the offense in the contest, who hit it off Cristian Javier. Astros starter Lance McCullers Jr. allowed a season-high four bases on ball while pitching five shoutout innings. Javier (7–9), making his first relief appearance since April, hurled three total innings and struck out four. On August 27, the Orioles again leveraged a sharp pitching performance from a young starter for a 3–1 win. Dean Kremer (6–4) allowed four hits in a career-high 7 2/3 innings, and Anthony Santander and Austin Hays both homered for the Orioles. For the Astros, Kyle Tucker went hitless to end a career-best 17-game hitting streak, and David Hensley made his major league debut, starting at shortstop and going 0-for-3. Justin Verlander started the series finale, leaving after three scoreless innings and six strikeouts due to right calf discomfort. The bullpen took over, and Houston won the finale, 3–1. Verlander's shortest outing of his season, it broke a string of a club-record 41 of at least five innings each by Astros' starting pitching. Seth Martinez took over for Verlander, and Bryan Abreu, Ryne Stanek (2–1) and Héctor Neris followed. In the bottom of the third, Hensley doubled off Orioles' starter Austin Voth for his first major league hit. The game remained scoreless until Yuli Gurriel's two-run groundball single in the seventh inning. Tucker doubled twice, and Alex Bregman walked twice, scored twice, and homered in the eighth inning (20). Rafael Montero allowed one run on three hits striking out Rougned Odor for the final out and securing the save (9). Mauricio Dubón, starting in center field, collected one single and two outfield assists, rifling out both Robinson Chirinos and Jorge Mateo at third base.

August 30–31 at Texas Rangers: Houston won series, 2–0

Framber Valdez hurled eight innings and allowed two runs in a 4–2 win versus Texas in the opener for his 22nd consecutive quality start—among left-handers, it was both the most consecutive in major league history and highest total in one season, and second-most consecutive among all pitchers. It was the fourth-most overall in one season, tying Hall of Famer Bob Gibson (1968) and Chris Carpenter (2005) behind Jacob deGrom (24 consecutive in 2018). Jose Altuve doubled twice, walked twice, scored twice and drove in two runs lead a 5–3 win over Texas on August 31. Astros right-hander Cristian Javier (8–9) started and worked five innings, allowing three runs and struck out seven. Rafael Montero closed out the ninth for his tenth save, the first time he had recorded double figures in saves in a season.

Bregman named Player of the Month. Entering the month of August with a .773 OPS, Alex Bregman batted 362/.452/.681 with nine doubles, seven home runs, 22 RBI, 17 walks and 27 runs scored over 27 games. It was his third career monthly award, which he had last won in August 2019.

==== September—October ====
The Astros promoted prospects Hunter Brown and Yainer Díaz from Sugar Land to the major league roster for the first time on September 1.

September 2–4 at Los Angeles Angels: Houston won series, 2–1

In the series opener versus Los Angeles, starter Lance McCullers Jr. (2–1) went 5 2/3 innings to continue an impressive comeback, allowing two runs, six hits, four walks and striking out seven as Houston won, 4–2. Yainer Díaz made his major league debut, starting as the designated hitter. He was 0-for-3 with a bases loaded walk for his first RBI. Astro starter Luis García (seven innings, seven strikeouts) matched the Angels' Shohei Ohtani (eight innings, five strikeouts) frame-for-frame with one run allowed apiece on September 3. Los Angeles won 2–1 in the bottom of the 12th after Matt Duffy's bloop single drove home automatic runner Taylor Ward. Center fielder Mauricio Dubón raced to catch Duffy's hit but replay showed the ball had dropped just inches from his reach. Ohtani became the 10th-fastest to reach 400 strikeouts. The Astros took the finale on September 4, winning 9–1 on Jose Altuve going 3-for4 with a home run, double, and three RBI. José Urquidy (13–5) delivered seven sterling shutout innings with eight strikeouts and four hits allowed.

September 5–7 vs Texas Rangers: Houston won series, 2–1

All-time franchise record at .500. With a 1–0 win over the Rangers on September 5, the Astros raised their all-time franchise win-loss record to .500 at 4,812–4,812, for the first time since in May 14, 2006 (3,519–3,519). Thus far, the Astros had ended a total of 25 games above .500 since they began play in 1962.

On September 5, Hunter Brown (1–0) started and won a sensational major league debut, hurling the first six innings of a 1–0 shutout of the Texas Rangers. He allowed three hits, one walk and struck out five to outduel Rangers All-Star Martín Pérez. Brown retired the first eight batters, including striking out the first two of the game, Marcus Semien and Corey Seager, for his first career strikeouts. Martín Maldonado, who caught the entire game, singled home Trey Mancini in the second inning for the game's only run. On September 6, Framber Valdez delivered a 23rd consecutive quality start, but Seager scored the go-ahead run in the seventh on a wild pitch from Valdez (14–5) on the way to a 4–3 Rangers win. The Astros committed three errors and were 1-for-11 with runners in scoring position. On September 7, Jose Altuve scored on a wild pitch with two outs and bases loaded in the bottom of the tenth for the winning run (4–3). Héctor Neris pitched the tenth for the Astros to earn the win (5–4).

September 9–11 vs Los Angeles Angels: Houston won series, 2–1

On September 9, center fielder Chas McCormick homered and drove in three runs to lead the Astros to a 4–3 win, backing Lance McCullers Jr. (3–1) in his longest outing of the season with seven innings. Closer Ryan Pressly, in a return from the injured list, allowed a solo home run in the ninth inning to Taylor Ward before ending the game to earn his 26th save. Mike Trout homered for a sixth game in a row on September 10 as the Angels handed the Astros a 6–1 loss. Astros starter José Urquidy (13-6) was ambushed for a career high-tying six runs with ten hits over five innings. Five Astros home runs powered 12–3 win in the series finale on September 11, including from Dubón (5), Alex Bregman (21), Mancini (17), Yordan Alvarez (32), and Kyle Tucker (25). Bregman's home run was his fourth career grand slam to give the Astros the lead for good. Alvarez reached base four times total. Jose Altuve collected three hits and two runs scored for his 12th three-hit game of the season. Starter Luis García (12–8) won after allowing three runs on eight hits and in five innings on 88 pitches, striking out four.

September 12–14 at Detroit Tigers: Houston won series, 3–0

Valdez (15–5) tossed his first career shutout, a 7–0 win versus Detroit on September 12 while tying Jacob deGrom for an in-season record 24 consecutive quality starts (2018). In his second start of the season, Brown made his road debut in his hometown of Detroit, leading a 6–3 defeat of the Tigers. He allowed two runs on five hits in front of friends and family. His alma mater of Wayne State is one mile from Comerica Park. Yordan Alvarez homered and doubled, scoring three runs to power Houston's offense. Houston won 2–1 on September 14 largely between Cristian Javier's six scoreless innings to sweep both the series and season series (7–0) from Detroit. Javier (9–9) allowed two hits and no walks while striking out eight. Kyle Tucker homered leading off the fourth inning and Alex Bregman hit a sacrifice fly the following inning. It was Houston's first sweep of Detroit in a season series since moving to the American League in 2013.

September 15–18 vs Oakland Athletics: Houston won series, 3–1

McCullers hurled six innings on September 15 versus Oakland, issuing four walks, two hits, and two runs as he struck out 11, his most since July 29, 2018. Aledmys Díaz, just activated since the series in Detroit, homered (11) into the Crawford Boxes in the seventh inning to break a 2–2 tie. Seth Martinez (1–1) worked a scoreless seventh to earn his first major league win.

Astros clinch playoff berth on Alvarez' 3-home run game. On September 16, Yordan Alvarez and Justin Verlander led the Astros to a 5–0 victory over the A's to secure a sixth consecutive postseason berth. Alvarez, with a 4-hit performance, hit three home runs in consecutive at bats off A's starter Adrián Martínez. (Note: The 15th three-home-run game in franchise history, Alvarez became the third Astro to have hit two or more 3-HR games and first since Jeff Bagwell (two in 1999—3 total) and Glenn Davis (2).) Meanwhile, Verlander (17–3) hurled five hitless innings in a return from a calf injury sustained on August 28, walked one, and struck out nine. He extended a season-long winning streak to nine games while lowering his major league-leading ERA to 1.78. Alvarez hit one home run each hit in the first, third and fifth innings versus Martínez, making him the first Astros player to hit three off one pitcher in the same game.

Valdez' in-season quality start record. In the series finale and last meeting with Oakland for the season, Valdez allowed two runs over six innings for a 25th consecutive quality start, surpassing deGrom's in-season record, as Houston won 11–2. Alvarez and Maldonado each drove in four runs; Maldonado also scored four runs in a game for the first time in his career.

Alvarez earned the AL Player of the Week Award for the week ended September 18. He totaled a .520 average (13-for-25), .556 OBP, 1.280 slugging percentage, 10 runs scored, 10 RBI, four doubles and five home runs.

September 19–21 at Tampa Bay Rays: Houston won series, 3–0

Astros clinch AL West division title. The Astros clinched a fifth AL West division title over the last six season with a 4–0 victory over Tampa Bay in the two clubs' first meeting of the season on September 19. The win also granted Houston a bye through the American League Wild Card Series into the American League Division Series. Luis García (13–8) started the first five innings and won the combined shutout, followed by Brown (three innings) and Neris (one). Jose Altuve hit a leadoff home run (25) and Alex Bregman drive in two runs.

On September 20, Kyle Tucker reached 100 RBI for the first time in his career as the Astros won, 5–0. Yainer Díaz doubled in eighth inning off Javy Guerra for his first major league hit. Starter Cristian Javier did not allow any hits until the fifth inning, the only hit given up in five innings. Astros pitching hurled their 17th shutout of the season and extended a scoreless inning streak to 21. Tampa natives Lance McCullers Jr. and Kyle Tucker led the Astros to a 5–2 win for the series sweep on September 21, the first-ever at Tropicana Field for the Astros. McCullers allowed both runs over seven strong innings to earn the win, and Tucker hit the go-ahead home run in the eighth inning. The Astros' scoreless innings pitched streak reached 26 innings, their longest since a 28-inning streak in 2012.

September 22–25 at Baltimore Orioles: Houston split series with BAL, 2–2

On September 22 and 23, the Astros were shut out in consecutive games for the first time all season, led by brilliant performances from Baltimore starters Dean Kremer and Kyle Bradish for a second-consecutive turn against Houston.

Astros' 100th win is milestone for Baker. On September 24, Houston rallied from a 9–7 deficit in the ninth inning to mount an 11–10 win. Kyle Tucker two-out RBI double the score and Yuli Gurriel followed with a single versus Baltimore closer Félix Bautista (4–4), The Astros' 100th win of the season made manager Dusty Baker one of four in major league history to win the same number in both leagues, joining Sparky Anderson, Tony La Russa and Whitey Herzog.

Cristian Javier retired the first 13 Orioles faced on September 25, allowing one total hit and baserunner over six innings while striking eight for a game score of 78. Cristian Vázquez drove in three runs in extra innings, including a bases-loaded single to cap a four-run 11th inning as Houston won, 6–3.

September 27–28 vs Arizona Diamondbacks: Houston split series with ARI, 1–1

On September 27, Jose Altuve hit two of the Astros' five home runs as Houston won the opener of a two-game set, 10–2. David Hensley hit his first major league home run in the sixth inning versus Ian Kennedy. Former Astros pitching coach Brent Strom returned to Minute Maid Park in game action as a visitor for the first time since resigning his post with the club after the 2021 World Series. The Diamondbacks won the season series finale 5–2 on September 28 with a three-run rally in the tenth inning capped by Christian Walker's two-run single versus Will Smith (0–3). Chas McCormick hit a two-run home in the fifth inning to account for Houston's scoring.

September 30–October 2 vs Tampa Bay Rays: Houston won series, 2–1

In spite of a 7–3 loss to the Rays on September 30, the Astros clinched home-field advantage through the AL Championship Series following a Yankees' 2–1 loss to the Orioles. It was second time Houston secured the top AL playoff seed in franchise history, and third overall, to join the 1980 (NL) and the 2019 (AL) clubs with this distinction. Framber Valdez (16–6) allowed six runs to tie his season high, and 12 runs over his previous 16 2/3 innings.

Cristian Javier threw six shutout innings on October 1 and Jake Meyers collected two hits in his return from Sugar Land as the Astros won against the Rays, 2–1. Javier (11–9) increased his scoreless streak to 25 1/3 innings, the longest active in the major leagues. It was the 103rd win for the Astros, tying the 2018 team for second-most in franchise history, which trailed only the 107 piled on by the 2019 club. The Astros won again on October 2 versus Tampa Bay, 3–1, securing a new second-best franchise leader at 104 wins. Rookie shortstop Jeremy Peña and starter Luis García led the way, with Peña collecting his eighth three-hit game of the season and driving in all three runs, and García (15–8) establishing a new career-high in wins with one run allowed over six innings. The Astros improved to an incredible 41–6 (.872) with Peña batting second in the lineup. Yordan Alvarez opened a 40-game regular-season on-base streak, the seventh in club history 40 games or longer, which lasted until May 16 of the following season. (Note: Longest streak of consecutive games, from 1962 to 2026, Playing for HOU, in the regular season, requiring times on base ≥ 1, sorted by most games matching criteria.)

October 3–5 vs Philadelphia Phillies: Houston won series, 2–1

1,000 wins at Minute Maid Park. On October 4, Houston pitching, started by Verlander, took a no-hitter into the ninth inning while the Astros cruised to a 10–0 win over Philadelphia. Jeremy Pena, Kyle Tucker, and Martin Maldonado each homered in the first inning and the Astros piled on five runs in the opening frame before making their first out. Verlander worked the first five innings, Hunter Brown hurled 2 1/3 innings and Hector Neris converted two perfect outs. In the top of the ninth, former Astro Garrett Stubbs hit a leadoff single off lefty Will Smith to break up the no-hitter. Verlander (18–4), who struck out 10 batters, collected eight consecutive strikeouts to establish a personal best while tying a franchise record set by Jim Deshaies in 1986. Their 105th win of the season, it moved the 2022 Astros club into sole possession of second place in franchise history behind the 2019 team (107) for most wins in a season. It was also the 1,000th win for the Astros at Minute Maid Park, which opened in 2000.

In the regular season finale, Framber Valdez led a 3–2 win over Philadelphia with 10 strikeouts over five shutout innings. Houston, who won the fourth of their final five games, opened the scoring when Mauricio Dubón doubled home Chas McCormick in the third inning. Christian Vazquez hit a solo home run, hsi first as an Astro, and Yordan Alvarez also drove in a run. Ryne Stanek pitched a clean seventh to lower his ERA to 1.16, setting a franchise record that eclipsed Will Harris' 1.50 ERA set in 2019.

==== Performance overview ====
With a 106-win season in 2022, the Astros became the first major league team to reach 100 wins four times in a six-year span. Over the previous fifty seasons, they had tallied five 100-win seasons, tying the Los Angeles Dodgers and trailing only the Atlanta Braves (7) and New York Yankees (10).

For the seconds year in a row, this Astros team hit eight grand slams, which, at the time, placed second in franchise history to the 2019 squad (eleven during the regular season), and just ahead of the 2001, 2007, and 2018 editions (seven each).

The following accomplishments were rate-statistic qualifying records for a 162-game season, and in second place inclusive of all qualifying seasons:

- Astros pitching registered a 2.90 earned run average (ERA), a franchise record over a 162-game season, Only the 1981 club posted a lower ERA, at 2.66, over an entire season, which was shortened to 110 games due to the players’ strike. Maldonado was recognized with the 2022 Darryl Kile Award due in large part to his work handling the pitching staff.
- Justin Verlander recorded a 1.75 ERA, also winning the AL ERA title, trailing only Nolan Ryan, who, with a 1.69 ERA, won the 1981 NL ERA title.
- Yordan Alvarez produced a 187 adjusted OPS+, the second-highest in club history in a qualified season, trailing Bagwell's 213 OPS+ in the strike-shortened 1994 season.

The Astros' bullpen led the major leagues with a 2.80 ERA. Left-handed batters produced a .595 OPS against the bullpen, the lowest figure in the major leagues, in spite of the Astros having the second-fewest lefty–lefty matchups in the major leagues. The Astros' right-handed relievers limited left-handed batters to .206/.278/.308 slash; the .308 SLG was the lowest in major league baseball in such matchups.

Ryne Stanek recorded an ERA of 1.16, setting a franchise record for relief pitchers that eclipsed Will Harris' 1.50 ERA achieved in 2019.

Kyle Tucker joined Bagwell (1997 and 1999) as the only players in Astros history to have reached 30 home runs, 100 RBI, and 25 stolen bases in the same season.

Ryan Pressly recorded a career-high 33 saves, totaling 76 in an Astros uniform, which tied him with Fred Gladding for fourth place. The only hurlers with more saves as an Astro were Billy Wagner (225), Dave Smith (199) and Brad Lidge (123).

Major League Baseball awards nominees (finalists):

- Silver Slugger Award (×5): Altuve (2B), Alvarez (DH), Bregman (3B), Maldonado (C), Tucker (RF)

Baseball Writers' Association of America (BBWAA) awards finalists:

- AL Cy Young Award: Verlander
- AL MVP: Alvarez

=== League standings ===
==== American League West ====
AL West
Team	W	L	Pct.	GB	Home	Road
Houston Astros	106	56	.654	—	55‍–‍26	51‍–‍30
Seattle Mariners	90	72	.556	16	46‍–‍35	44‍–‍37
Los Angeles Angels	73	89	.451	33	40‍–‍41	33‍–‍48
Texas Rangers	68	94	.420	38	34‍–‍47	34‍–‍47
Oakland Athletics	60	102	.370	46	29‍–‍51	31‍–‍51

==== American League Wild Card ====
AL Wild Card standings

Division leaders
Team	W	L	Pct.
Houston Astros	106	56	.654
New York Yankees	99	63	.611
Cleveland Guardians	92	70	.568

Wild Card teams (Top 3 teams qualify for postseason)
Team	W	L	Pct.	GB
Toronto Blue Jays	92	70	.568	+6
Seattle Mariners	90	72	.556	+4
Tampa Bay Rays	86	76	.531	—
Baltimore Orioles	83	79	.512	3
Chicago White Sox	81	81	.500	5
Minnesota Twins	78	84	.481	8
Boston Red Sox	78	84	.481	8
Los Angeles Angels	73	89	.451	13
Texas Rangers	68	94	.420	18
Detroit Tigers	66	96	.407	20
Kansas City Royals	65	97	.401	21
Oakland Athletics	60	102	.370	26

==== Record vs. opponents ====
AL Records

2022 American League record Source: MLB Standings Grid – 2022
Team	BAL	BOS	CWS	CLE	DET	HOU	KC	LAA	MIN	NYY	OAK	SEA	TB	TEX	TOR	NL
Baltimore	—	9–10	5–2	3–3	1–5	4–3	4–3	6–1	3–4	7–12	3–4	2–4	9–10	6–0	9–10	12–8
Boston	10–9	—	2–4	5–2	5–1	4–2	3–4	4–3	3–4	6–13	5–1	6–1	7–12	6–1	3–16	9–11
Chicago	2–5	4–2	—	7–12	12–7	3–4	9–10	3–4	9–10	3–4	5–2	4–2	4–2	3–4	2–4	11–9
Cleveland	3–3	2–5	12–7	—	10–9	3–4	12–7	3–4	13–6	1–5	6–1	1–6	4–2	5–1	5–2	12–8
Detroit	5–1	1–5	7–12	9–10	—	0–7	10–9	3–3	8–11	1–5	2–5	1–6	2–5	4–3	2–5	11–9
Houston	3–4	2–4	4–3	4–3	7–0	—	5–2	13–6	6–0	5–2	12–7	12–7	5–1	14–5	2–4	12–8
Kansas City	3–4	4–3	10–9	7–12	9–10	2–5	—	3–3	7–12	1–6	3–3	2–4	3–4	2–4	2–5	7–13
Los Angeles	1–6	3–4	4–3	4–3	3–3	6–13	3–3	—	4–2	2–4	12–7	10–9	2–5	9–10	3–4	7–13
Minnesota	4–3	4–3	10–9	6–13	11–8	0–6	12–7	2–4	—	2–5	5–1	4–3	4–2	2–5	4–3	8–12
New York	12–7	13–6	4–3	5–1	5–1	2–5	6–1	4–2	5–2	—	5–2	2–4	11–8	4–3	11–8	10–10
Oakland	4–3	1–5	2–5	1–6	5–2	7–12	3–3	7–12	1–5	2–5	—	8–11	3–4	8–11	3–3	5–15
Seattle	4–2	1–6	2–4	6–1	6–1	7–12	4–2	9–10	3–4	4–2	11–8	—	2–5	14–5	5–2	12–8
Tampa Bay	10–9	12–7	2–4	2–4	5–2	1–5	4–3	5–2	2–4	8–11	4–3	5–2	—	4–3	10–9	12–8
Texas	0–6	1–6	4–3	1–5	3–4	5–14	4–2	10–9	5–2	3–4	11–8	5–14	3–4	—	2–4	11–9
Toronto	10–9	16–3	4–2	2–5	5–2	4–2	5–2	4–3	3–4	8–11	3–3	2–5	9–10	4–2	—	13–7

Updated with the results of all games through October 5, 2022.

=== Game log ===
Past games legend
Astros Win (#bfb)	Astros Loss (#fcc)	Game postponed (#bbb)	Clinched Playoff Berth (#039)	Clinched Division (#090)
Bold denotes an Astros pitcher

Future Games Legend
Home Game	Away Game

2022 Game Log: 106–56 (Home: 55–26; Away: 51–30)
April: 11–10 (Home: 2–4; Away: 9–6)

#	Date	Opponent	Score	Win	Loss	Save	Attendance	Record	Streak/ Box
1	April 7	@ Angels	3–1	**Valdez** (1–0)	Ohtani (0–1)	**Pressly** (1)	44,723	1–0	W1
2	April 8	@ Angels	13–6	**Montero** (1–0)	Ortega (0–1)	—	42,719	2–0	W2
3	April 9	@ Angels	0–2	Syndergaard (1–0)	**Verlander** (0–1)	Iglesias (1)	36,139	2–1	L1
4	April 10	@ Angels	4–1	**Urquidy** (1–0)	Suárez (0–1)	**Pressly** (2)	41,253	3–1	W1
5	April 12	@ Diamondbacks	2–1	**Neris** (1–0)	Melancon (0–1)	**Pressly** (3)	17,674	4–1	W2
6	April 13	@ Diamondbacks	2–3 (10)	Pérez (1–1)	**Pressly** (0–1)	—	10,841	4–2	L1
7	April 15	@ Mariners	1–11	Gonzales (1–1)	**Odorizzi** (0–1)	—	45,023	4–3	L2
8	April 16	@ Mariners	4–0	**Verlander** (1–1)	Flexen (0–2)	—	38,504	5–3	W1
9	April 17	@ Mariners	2–7	Brash (1–1)	**Urquidy** (1–1)	—	26,583	5–4	L1
10	April 18	Angels	8–3	**García** (1–0)	Lorenzen (1–1)	—	42,646	6–4	W1
11	April 19	Angels	2–7	Ortega (1–1)	**Valdez** (1–1)	—	30,212	6–5	L1
12	April 20	Angels	0–6	Ohtani (1–2)	**Odorizzi** (0–2)	—	29,049	6–6	L2
13	April 22	Blue Jays	3–4	Mayza (1–0)	**Neris** (1–1)	Romano (8)	36,757	6–7	L3
14	April 23	Blue Jays	2–3	Manoah (3–0)	**Taylor** (0–1)	Cimber (1)	36,075	6–8	L4
15	April 24	Blue Jays	8–7 (10)	**Taylor** (1–1)	Romano (0–1)	—	39,534	7–8	W1
16	April 25	@ Rangers	2–6	Moore (1–0)	**Maton** (0–1)	—	17,420	7–9	L1
17	April 26	@ Rangers	5–1	**Odorizzi** (1–2)	Hearn (0–2)	—	16,469	8–9	W1
18	April 27	@ Rangers	4–3	**Javier** (1–0)	Martin (0–2)	**Stanek** (1)	20,399	9–9	W2
19	April 28	@ Rangers	3–2	**Verlander** (2–1)	Bush (0–1)	**Montero** (1)	19,484	10–9	W3
20	April 29	@ Blue Jays	11–7	**Urquidy** (2–1)	Thornton (0–2)	—	35,066	11–9	W4
21	April 30	@ Blue Jays	1–2	Berríos (2–0)	**García** (1–1)	Romano (10)	40,732	11–10	L1

May: 21–8 (Home: 12–2; Away: 9–6)

#	Date	Opponent	Score	Win	Loss	Save	Attendance	Record	Streak/ Box
22	May 1	@ Blue Jays	2–3	Gausman (2–1)	**Valdez** (1–2)	Romano (11)	31,802	11–11	L2
23	May 2	Mariners	3–0	**Odorizzi** (2–2)	Gonzales (1–3)	**Montero** (2)	27,321	12–11	W1
24	May 3	Mariners	4–0	**Javier** (2–0)	Flexen (1–4)	—	23,796	13–11	W2
25	May 4	Mariners	7–2	**Verlander** (3–1)	Brash (1–3)	—	24,110	14–11	W3
26	May 5	Tigers	3–2	**Pressly** (1–1)	Soto (1–2)	—	24,116	15–11	W4
27	May 6	Tigers	3–2	**García** (2–1)	Brieske (0–2)	**Montero** (3)	38,020	16–11	W5
28	May 7	Tigers	3–2	**Abreu** (1–0)	Fulmer (1–1)	**Pressly** (4)	34,109	17–11	W6
29	May 8	Tigers	5–0	**Odorizzi** (3–2)	Hutchison (0–3)	—	36,934	18–11	W7
30	May 10	@ Twins	5–0	**Verlander** (4–1)	Ryan (3–2)	—	16,156	19–11	W8
—	May 11	@ Twins	SUSPENDED, RAIN; resuming on MAY 12						
31	May 12 (1)	@ Twins	11–3	**Abreu** (2–0)	Archer (0–1)	—	see 2nd game	20–11	W9
32	May 12 (2)	@ Twins	5–0	**García** (3–1)	Winder (2–1)	—	16,918	21–11	W10
33	May 13	@ Nationals	6–1	**Valdez** (2–2)	Gray (4–3)	—	18,433	22–11	W11
34	May 14	@ Nationals	6–13	Rogers (2–2)	**Javier** (2–1)	—	22,949	22–12	L1
35	May 15	@ Nationals	8–0	**Verlander** (5–1)	Corbin (0–6)	—	25,915	23–12	W1
36	May 16	@ Red Sox	3–6	Strahm (2–1)	**Neris** (1–2)	Robles (2)	29,706	23–13	L1
37	May 17	@ Red Sox	13–4	**Urquidy** (3–1)	Eovaldi (1–2)	—	27,328	24–13	W1
38	May 18	@ Red Sox	1–5	Pivetta (2–4)	**García** (3–2)	—	31,717	24–14	L1
39	May 19	Rangers	5–1	**Valdez** (3–2)	Otto (1–2)	—	34,593	25–14	W1
40	May 20	Rangers	0–3	Pérez (3–2)	**Javier** (2–2)	—	35,294	25–15	L1
41	May 21	Rangers	2–1	**Verlander** (6–1)	Gray (1–2)	**Pressly** (5)	37,187	26–15	W1
42	May 22	Rangers	5–2	**Urquidy** (4–1)	Hearn (2–3)	**Pressly** (6)	38,745	27–15	W2
43	May 23	Guardians	1–6	McKenzie (3–3)	**García** (3–3)	—	28,284	27–16	L1
44	May 24	Guardians	7–3	**Valdez** (4–2)	Plesac (1–4)	—	26,621	28–16	W1
45	May 25	Guardians	2–1	**Javier** (3–2)	Quantrill (1–3)	**Pressly** (7)	25,412	29–16	W2
46	May 27	@ Mariners	1–6	Flexen (2–6)	**Verlander** (6–2)	—	26,017	29–17	L1
47	May 28	@ Mariners	0–6	Gilbert (5–2)	**Urquidy** (4–2)	—	24,007	29–18	L2
48	May 29	@ Mariners	2–1	**Montero** (2–0)	Gonzales (3–5)	**Pressly** (8)	28,986	30–18	W1
49	May 30	@ Athletics	5–1	**Valdez** (5–2)	Blackburn (5–1)	—	8,753	31–18	W2
50	May 31	@ Athletics	3–1	**Montero** (3–0)	Montas (2–5)	**Pressly** (9)	3,469	32–18	W3

June: 16–9 (Home: 7–5; Away: 9–4)

#	Date	Opponent	Score	Win	Loss	Save	Attendance	Record	Streak/ Box
51	June 1	@ Athletics	5–4	**Abreu** (3–0)	Jiménez (2–3)	**Pressly** (10)	5,189	33–18	W4
52	June 3	@ Royals	10–3	**Urquidy** (5–2)	Singer (2–1)	—	22,516	34–18	W5
53	June 4	@ Royals	0–6	Snider (4–2)	**García** (3–4)	—	14,663	34–19	L1
54	June 5	@ Royals	7–4	**Valdez** (6–2)	Heasley (0–3)	**Montero** (4)	12,776	35–19	W1
55	June 6	Mariners	4–7	Ray (5–6)	**Javier** (3–3)	Castillo (3)	27,521	35–20	L1
56	June 7	Mariners	4–1	**Verlander** (7–2)	Flexen (2–7)	**Pressly** (11)	30,583	36–20	W1
57	June 8	Mariners	3–6	Gilbert (6–2)	**Urquidy** (5–3)	Castillo (4)	23,752	36–21	L1
58	June 10	Marlins	4–7	Sulser (1–3)	**García** (3–5)	Scott (4)	34,163	36–22	L2
59	June 11	Marlins	1–5	Garrett (1–1)	**Valdez** (6–3)	—	31,379	36–23	L3
60	June 12	Marlins	9–4	**Verlander** (8–2)	Cabrera (2–1)	—	29,341	37–23	W1
61	June 13	@ Rangers	3–5	Burke (4–1)	**Neris** (1–3)	Moore (1)	29,805	37–24	L1
62	June 14	@ Rangers	4–3	**Abreu** (4–0)	King (1–3)	**Pressly** (12)	29,370	38–24	W1
63	June 15	@ Rangers	9–2	**García** (4–5)	Miller (0–1)	—	24,992	39–24	W2
64	June 17	White Sox	13–3	**Valdez** (7–3)	Giolito (4–3)	—	35,467	40–24	W3
65	June 18	White Sox	0–7	Cueto (1–3)	**Verlander** (8–3)	—	36,747	40–25	L1
66	June 19	White Sox	4–3	**Javier** (4–3)	Kopech (2–3)	**Pressly** (13)	37,709	41–25	W1
67	June 21	Mets	8–2	**Urquidy** (6–3)	Williams (1–4)	—	35,140	42–25	W2
68	June 22	Mets	5–3	**García** (5–5)	Carrasco (8–3)	**Pressly** (14)	35,450	43–25	W3
69	June 23	@ Yankees	6–7	Castro (4–0)	**Pressly** (1–2)	—	44,071	43–26	L1
70	June 24	@ Yankees	3–1	**Verlander** (9–3)	Severino (4–2)	**Montero** (5)	47,528	44–26	W1
71	June 25	@ Yankees	3–0	**Javier** (5–3)	Cole (6–2)	**Pressly** (15)	45,076	45–26	W2
72	June 26	@ Yankees	3–6 (10)	King (5–1)	**Martinez** (0–1)	—	44,028	45–27	L1
73	June 28	@ Mets	9–1	**Valdez** (8–3)	Carrasco (8–4)	—	36,673	46–27	W1
74	June 29	@ Mets	2–0	**Verlander** (10–3)	Smith (1–2)	**Pressly** (16)	29,230	47–27	W2
75	June 30	Yankees	2–1	**García** (6–5)	Severino (4–3)	**Pressly** (17)	40,674	48–27	W3

July: 19–9 (Home: 12–4; Away: 7–5)

#	Date	Opponent	Score	Win	Loss	Save	Attendance	Record	Streak/ Box
76	July 1	Angels	8–1	**Javier** (6–3)	Lorenzen (6–6)	—	36,420	49–27	W4
77	July 2	Angels	9–1	**Urquidy** (7–3)	Sandoval (3–3)	—	35,332	50–27	W5
78	July 3	Angels	4–2	**Pressly** (2–2)	Tepera (1–2)	—	36,048	51–27	W6
79	July 4	Royals	7–6	**Stanek** (1–0)	Barlow (2–2)	—	33,936	52–27	W7
80	July 5	Royals	9–7	**García** (7–5)	Greinke (2–5)	**Montero** (6)	28,762	53–27	W8
81	July 6	Royals	4–7	Keller (4–9)	**Javier** (6–4)	Barlow (13)	26,534	53–28	L1
82	July 7	Royals	5–2	**Verlander** (11–3)	Bubic (1–6)	**Pressly** (18)	36,067	54–28	W1
83	July 8	@ Athletics	8–3	**Urquidy** (8–3)	Blackburn (6–4)	—	6,012	55–28	W2
84	July 9	@ Athletics	2–3	Logue (3–4)	**Valdez** (8–4)	Trivino (7)	10,058	55–29	L1
85	July 10	@ Athletics	6–1	**Odorizzi** (4–2)	Irvin (3–7)	—	10,195	56–29	W1
86	July 12	@ Angels	6–5	**Neris** (2–3)	Iglesias (2–6)	**Pressly** (19)	27,180	57–29	W2
87	July 13	@ Angels	1–7	Ohtani (9–4)	**Javier** (6–5)	—	27,803	57–30	L1
88	July 14	@ Angels	3–2 (10)	**Pressly** (3–2)	Loup (0–3)	—	34,496	58–30	W1
89	July 15	Athletics	1–5	Irvin (4–7)	**Urquidy** (8–4)	—	39,434	58–31	L1
90	July 16	Athletics	5–0	**Verlander** (12–3)	Koenig (1–3)	—	39,125	59–31	W1
91	July 17	Athletics	3–4	Puk (2–1)	**Montero** (3–1)	Trivino (8)	34,534	59–32	L1
–	July 19	92nd All-Star Game	AL 3–2 NL	**Valdez** (1–0)	Gonsolin (0–1)	Clase (1)	52,518	N/A	N/A
92	July 21 (1)	Yankees	3–2	**Neris** (3–3)	King (6–3)	—	36,225	60–32	W1
93	July 21 (2)	Yankees	7–5	**García** (8–5)	Germán (0–1)	**Montero** (7)	39,342	61–32	W2
94	July 22	@ Mariners	5–2	**Urquidy** (9–4)	Gonzales (5–10)	**Neris** (1)	45,290	62–32	W3
95	July 23	@ Mariners	3–1	**Verlander** (13–3)	Gilbert (10–4)	**Abreu** (1)	43,197	63–32	W4
96	July 24	@ Mariners	8–5	**Valdez** (9–4)	Ray (8–7)	**Pressly** (20)	34,827	64–32	W5
97	July 25	@ Athletics	5–7	Oller (1–3)	**Odorizzi** (4–3)	Trivino (9)	4,105	64–33	L1
98	July 26	@ Athletics	3–5	Montas (4–9)	**García** (8–6)	Trivino (10)	5,130	64–34	L2
99	July 27	@ Athletics	2–4	Irvin (6–7)	**Javier** (6–6)	Puk (2)	9,367	64–35	L3
100	July 28	Mariners	4–2	**Montero** (4–1)	Muñoz (1–4)	**Pressly** (21)	29,799	65–35	W1
101	July 29	Mariners	11–1	**Verlander** (14–3)	Ray (8–8)	—	38,497	66–35	W2
102	July 30	Mariners	4–5	Swanson (2–0)	**Pressly** (3–3)	Sewald (13)	37,385	66–36	L1
103	July 31	Mariners	3–2 (10)	**Neris** (4–3)	Bernardino (0–1)	—	35,773	67–36	W1

August: 17–11 (Home: 10–5; Away: 7–6)

#	Date	Opponent	Score	Win	Loss	Save	Attendance	Record	Streak/ Box
104	August 1	Red Sox	2–3	Eovaldi (5–3)	**García** (8–7)	Houck (7)	35,185	67–37	L1
105	August 2	Red Sox	1–2	Crawford (3–3)	**Javier** (6–7)	Houck (8)	31,229	67–38	L2
106	August 3	Red Sox	6–1	**Urquidy** (10–4)	Hill (4–5)	—	32,295	68–38	W1
107	August 4	@ Guardians	6–0	**Verlander** (15–3)	Plesac (2–10)	—	16,808	69–38	W2
108	August 5	@ Guardians	9–3	**Valdez** (10–4)	Gaddis (0–1)	—	24,712	70–38	W3
109	August 6	@ Guardians	1–4	Quantrill (8–5)	**García** (8–8)	—	25,327	70–39	L1
110	August 7	@ Guardians	0–1	McKenzie (8–8)	**Javier** (6–8)	Clase (24)	22,688	70–40	L2
111	August 9	Rangers	7–5	**Urquidy** (11–4)	Pérez (9–3)	**Pressly** (22)	30,629	71–40	W1
112	August 10	Rangers	4–8 (10)	Hearn (5–6)	**Maton** (0–2)	—	26,670	71–41	L1
113	August 11	Rangers	7–3	**Valdez** (11–4)	Ragans (0–1)	—	30,872	72–41	W1
114	August 12	Athletics	7–5	**García** (9–8)	Moll (1–2)	**Neris** (2)	31,230	73–41	W2
115	August 13	Athletics	8–0	**McCullers Jr.** (1–0)	Logue (3–6)	—	34,078	74–41	W3
116	August 14	Athletics	6–3	**Javier** (7–8)	Irvin (6–10)	**Pressly** (23)	38,906	75–41	W4
117	August 15	@ White Sox	2–4	Cueto (5–5)	**Montero** (4–2)	Hendriks (26)	18,205	75–42	L1
118	August 16	@ White Sox	3–4	Lambert (1–2)	**Neris** (4–4)	Hendriks (27)	23,476	75–43	L2
119	August 17	@ White Sox	3–2	**Valdez** (12–4)	Kopech (4–9)	**Pressly** (24)	24,671	76–43	W1
120	August 18	@ White Sox	21–5	**García** (10–8)	Giolito (9–7)	—	24,407	77–43	W2
121	August 19	@ Braves	2–6	Wright (15–5)	**McCullers Jr.** (1–1)	—	42,837	77–44	L1
122	August 20	@ Braves	4–5 (10)	Stephens (2–2)	**Stanek** (1–1)	—	42,893	77–45	L2
123	August 21	@ Braves	5–4	**Urquidy** (12–4)	Lee (3–1)	**Pressly** (25)	42,531	78–45	W1
124	August 23	Twins	4–2	**Verlander** (16–3)	Sanchez (3–4)	**Abreu** (2)	32,639	79–45	W2
125	August 24	Twins	5–3	**Valdez** (13–4)	Bundy (7–6)	—	27,070	80–45	W3
126	August 25	Twins	6–3	**García** (11–8)	Archer (2–7)	**Montero** (8)	33,320	81–45	W4
127	August 26	Orioles	0–2	Bradish (2–5)	**Javier** (7–9)	Tate (3)	31,035	81–46	L1
128	August 27	Orioles	1–3	Kremer (6–4)	**Urquidy** (12–5)	Bautista (10)	34,526	81–47	L2
129	August 28	Orioles	3–1	**Stanek** (2–1)	Voth (4–2)	**Montero** (9)	31,559	82–47	W1
130	August 30	@ Rangers	4–2	**Valdez** (14–4)	Dunning (3–7)	**Neris** (3)	25,566	83–47	W2
131	August 31	@ Rangers	5–3	**Javier** (8–9)	Pérez (10–5)	**Montero** (10)	19,607	84–47	W3

September: 18–8 (Home: 8–5; Away: 10–3)

#	Date	Opponent	Score	Win	Loss	Save	Attendance	Record	Streak/ Box
132	September 2	@ Angels	4–2	**McCullers Jr.** (2–1)	Detmers (5–5)	**Montero** (11)	22,464	85–47	W4
133	September 3	@ Angels	1–2 (12)	Tepera (3–2)	**Smith** (0–2)	—	38,244	85–48	L1
134	September 4	@ Angels	9–1	**Urquidy** (13–5)	Davidson (2–5)	—	28,179	86–48	W1
135	September 5	Rangers	1–0	**Brown** (1–0)	Pérez (10–6)	**Montero** (12)	35,162	87–48	W2
136	September 6	Rangers	3–4	Hearn (6–7)	**Valdez** (14–5)	Leclerc (3)	26,803	87–49	L1
137	September 7	Rangers	4–3 (10)	**Neris** (5–4)	Hernández (1–2)	—	26,239	88–49	W1
138	September 9	Angels	4–3	**McCullers Jr.** (3–1)	Wantz (2–1)	**Pressly** (26)	33,509	89–49	W2
139	September 10	Angels	1–6	Ohtani (12–8)	**Urquidy** (13–6)	—	38,533	89–50	L1
140	September 11	Angels	12–4	**García** (12–8)	Davidson (2–6)	—	32,901	90–50	W1
141	September 12	@ Tigers	7–0	**Valdez** (15–5)	Rodríguez (3–5)	—	13,054	91–50	W2
142	September 13	@ Tigers	6–3	**Brown** (2–0)	Hutchison (2–8)	**Pressly** (27)	13,820	92–50	W3
143	September 14	@ Tigers	2–1	**Javier** (9–9)	Wentz (1–2)	**Pressly** (28)	13,947	93–50	W4
144	September 15	Athletics	5–2	**Martinez** (1–1)	Payamps (3–6)	**Montero** (13)	26,543	94–50	W5
145	September 16	Athletics	5–0	**Verlander** (17–3)	Martínez (4–5)	—	33,850	95–50	W6
146	September 17	Athletics	5–8	Irvin (9–11)	**Urquidy** (13–7)	Acevedo (2)	33,419	95–51	L1
147	September 18	Athletics	11–2	**Valdez** (16–5)	Waldichuk (0–2)	—	30,375	96–51	W1
148	September 19	@ Rays	4–0	**García** (13–8)	Rasmussen (10–6)	—	10,390	97–51	W2
149	September 20	@ Rays	5–0	**Javier** (10–9)	McClanahan (12–6)	**Pressly** (29)	8,992	98–51	W3
150	September 21	@ Rays	5–2	**McCullers Jr.** (4–1)	Raley (1–2)	**Pressly** (30)	9,293	99–51	W4
151	September 22	@ Orioles	0–2	Bradish (4–7)	**Verlander** (17–4)	Bautista (15)	16,417	99–52	L1
152	September 23	@ Orioles	0–6	Kremer (8–5)	**Urquidy** (13–8)	—	22,833	99–53	L2
153	September 24	@ Orioles	11–10	**Montero** (5–2)	Bautista (4–4)	**Pressly** (31)	22,546	100–53	W1
154	September 25	@ Orioles	6–3 (11)	**Neris** (6–4)	Akin (3–3)	—	24,449	101–53	W2
155	September 27	Diamondbacks	10–2	**García** (14–8)	Davies (2–5)	—	37,480	102–53	W3
156	September 28	Diamondbacks	2–5 (10)	Moronta (2–1)	**Smith** (0–3)	Melancon (18)	35,670	102–54	L1
157	September 30	Rays	3–7	Rasmussen (11–7)	**Valdez** (16–6)	—	37,349	102–55	L2

October: 4–1 (Home: 4–1; Away: 0–0)

#	Date	Opponent	Score	Win	Loss	Save	Attendance	Record	Streak/ Box
158	October 1	Rays	2–1	**Javier** (11–9)	McClanahan (12–8)	**Pressly** (32)	37,406	103–55	W1
159	October 2	Rays	3–1	**García** (15–8)	Kluber (10–10)	**Montero** (14)	35,809	104–55	W2
160	October 3	Phillies	0–3	Nola (11–13)	**McCullers Jr.** (4–2)	Eflin (1)	32,324	104–56	L1
161	October 4	Phillies	10–0	**Verlander** (18–4)	Suárez (10–7)	—	32,032	105–56	W1
162	October 5	Phillies	3–2	**Valdez** (17–6)	Plassmeyer (0–1)	**Pressly** (33)	32,432	106–56	W2

== Postseason ==
=== Postseason game log ===
2022 Postseason Game Log: 11–2 (Home: 6–1; Away: 5–1)
AL Division Series vs. Mariners: 3–0 (Home: 2–0; Away: 1–0)

#	Date	Opponent	Score	Win	Loss	Save	Attendance	Series
1	October 11	Mariners	8–7	Montero (1–0)	Ray (0–1)	—	41,125	1–0
2	October 13	Mariners	4–2	Neris (1–0)	Castillo (1–1)	Pressly (1)	41,774	2–0
3	October 15	@ Mariners	1–0 (18)	García (1–0)	Murfee (0–1)	—	47,690	3–0

AL Championship Series vs. Yankees: 4–0 (Home: 2–0; Away: 2–0)

#	Date	Opponent	Score	Win	Loss	Save	Attendance	Series
1	October 19	Yankees	4–2	Verlander (1–0)	Schmidt (0–2)	Pressly (2)	41,487	1–0
2	October 20	Yankees	3–2	Valdez (1–0)	Severino (0–1)	Pressly (3)	41,700	2–0
3	October 22	@ Yankees	5–0	Javier (1–0)	Cole (2–1)	—	47,569	3–0
4	October 23	@ Yankees	6–5	Neris (2–0)	Loáisiga (0–1)	Pressly (4)	46,545	4–0

World Series vs. Phillies: 4–2 (Home: 2–1; Away: 2–1)

#	Date	Opponent	Score	Win	Loss	Save	Attendance	Series
1	October 28	Phillies	5–6 (10)	Domínguez (2–0)	García (1–1)	Robertson (1)	42,903	0–1
2	October 29	Phillies	5–2	Valdez (2–0)	Wheeler (1–2)	—	42,926	1–1
—	October 31	@ Phillies	Postponed (rain); Makeup November 1					
3	November 1	@ Phillies	0–7	Suárez (2–0)	McCullers Jr. (0–1)	—	45,172	1–2
4	November 2	@ Phillies	5–0	Javier (2–0)	Nola (2–2)	—	45,693	2–2
5	November 3	@ Phillies	3–2	Verlander (2–0)	Syndergaard (0–1)	Pressly (5)	45,693	3–2
6	November 5	Phillies	4–1	Valdez (3–0)	Wheeler (1–3)	Pressly (6)	42,958	4–2

=== American League Division Series ===
Game 1 at Minute Maid Park

In Game 1 of the Division Series, Astros ace Justin Verlander surrendered six runs on ten hits in four innings, including a combined a 5-for-5 by Seattle's first two hitters, Julio Rodríguez and Ty France. Yordan Alvarez hit a two-run double in the third inning, and Yuli Gurriel and Alex Bregman later homered to cut the Mariners' lead to 7–5 through eight innings. Alvarez also threw out France at home plate in the fourth inning. In the bottom of the ninth, David Hensley, making his postseason debut as a pinch hitter, was hit by a Paul Sewald delivery, before Jeremy Peña reached with a single. Lefty Robbie Ray relieved Sewald with two outs, and the left-handed-hitting Alvarez hit a three-run walk-off home run to secure an 8–7 win for the Astros. A historic home run, it became the first instance of an MLB postseason contest to be decided by a walk-off home run with two outs and the home team trailing by more than one run. (Note: Alvarez' walk-off home run surpassed win probability added (WPA) values of other postseason games decided by walk-off home runs, including Kirk Gibson's home run during the 1988 World Series, for highest WPA on one play (91% to 87%). Offensively, Alvarez' total of 1.054 WPA (or 105.4f%) for Game 1 exceeded David Freese's production including his walk-off home run in Game 6 of the 2011 World Series for highest-ever in an MLB postseason contest.).

Game 2 at Minute Maid Park

In Game 2 of the Division Series, as it happened two days earlier, Seattle tried to hold on to a lead late in the game before Yordan Alvarez came up to the plate to crush those plans. In the sixth inning, with two outs, Jeremy Peña lined a hit to get on base for Alvarez to bat. A couple of pitches later, Alvarez lined a towering shot into left field off of Mariners ace Luis Castillo to give the Astros a 3–2 lead. Alvarez became the second player to hit go-ahead home runs in the sixth inning or later of back-to-back postseason games, joining Troy Glaus in the 2002 American League Division Series, and the first to do it with his team trailing in both games. Kyle Tucker had started the scoring with a home run for Houston in the bottom of the second, while the Mariners got their two runs in the fourth on a fielder's choice error scoring Eugenio Suárez and a Dylan Moore single scoring Mitch Haniger. In the eighth inning, Pena drew a walk to bring up Alvarez with two outs, which led to Seattle intentionally walking him. Alex Bregman was next, and he hit a line drive to right field that got Pena running all the way home. Seattle left thirteen runners on base, which included having the bases loaded in the sixth (with Héctor Neris inducing a ground out) and a double play lineout in the ninth. With the win, the Astros had won the first two games of an ALDS for the sixth straight year.

Game 3 at T-Mobile Park

A new postseason record was set in Game 3, the first postseason game in Seattle in 21 years. The two teams did not score for 17 innings, becoming the longest scoreless postseason game in MLB history, surpassing the record of 14 scoreless innings in the 2022 American League Wild Card Series Game 2 between the Cleveland Guardians and the Tampa Bay Rays a week earlier. The game also broke the record set that day for most combined strikeouts in a postseason game with 42. Jeremy Peña hit a solo home run to give Houston the lead in the top of the 18th. Luis García hurled five innings of relief to earn the victory. With 18 innings, this game is tied with the 2005 NLDS Game 4—which also involved the Astros—the 2014 NLDS Game 2, and 2018 World Series Game 3 as the longest postseason games in MLB history in terms of innings, with this being the second to go the full eighteen (as the home team in two of the games won on a walk-off before making three outs). (Note: Peña's home run mirrored a feat by another Astros rookie, Chris Burke, who hit the series-clinching walk-off home run in the 18th versus the Atlanta Braves to finish Game 4 of the 2005 NLDS.) In addition, this was the first MLB game to go 18 innings since a 19-inning September 24, 2019, game between the Cardinals and Diamondbacks. With the win, the Astros became the first American League team to reach the American League Championship Series (ALCS) in six consecutive seasons.

In defeating the Mariners 1–0 in Game 3, the Astros established the postseason record for the longest shutout game in terms of innings pitched.

The Dodgers, winners of a major league-leading 111 games during the regular season, fell to the Padres in the National League Division Series, giving the Astros home-field advantage for as far as they could extend their playoff run in 2022.

Game 1, October 11 at Minute Maid Park

Tuesday, October 11, 2022 2:37 pm CDT at Minute Maid Park in Houston, Texas
Team	1	2	3	4	5	6	7	8	9	R	H	E
Seattle	1	3	0	2	0	2	1	0	0	7	13	0
Houston	0	0	2	1	0	0	0	2	3	8	11	0
WP: Rafael Montero (1–0) LP: Robbie Ray (0–1); Home runs: SEA: J. P. Crawford (1), Eugenio Suárez (1); HOU: Yuli Gurriel (1), Alex Bregman (1), Yordan Alvarez (1); Attendance: 41,125; Boxscore

Game 2, October 13 at Minute Maid Park

Thursday, October 13, 2022 2:37 pm CDT at Minute Maid Park in Houston, Texas
Team	1	2	3	4	5	6	7	8	9	R	H	E
Seattle	0	0	0	2	0	0	0	0	0	2	5	0
Houston	0	1	0	0	0	2	0	1	X	4	6	1
WP: Héctor Neris (1–0) LP: Luis Castillo (0–1) Sv: Ryan Pressly (1); Home runs: SEA: None; HOU: Kyle Tucker (1), Yordan Alvarez (2); Attendance: 41,774; Boxscore

Game 3, October 15 at T-Mobile Park

Saturday, October 15, 2022 1:07pm (PDT) at T-Mobile Park in Seattle, Washington
Team	1	2	3	4	5	6	7	8	9	10	11	12	13	14	15	16	17	18	R	H	E
Houston	0	0	0	0	0	0	0	0	0	0	0	0	0	0	0	0	0	1	1	11	0
Seattle	0	0	0	0	0	0	0	0	0	0	0	0	0	0	0	0	0	0	0	7	0
WP: Luis García (1–0) LP: Penn Murfee (0–1); Home runs: HOU: Jeremy Peña (1); SEA: None; Attendance: 47,690; Boxscore

=== American League Championship Series ===
Because the Astros vied for the AL pennant for a sixth consecutive year, MLB.com journalist Brian McTaggart noted that the American League Champion Series (ALCS) was informally referred to as the "Houston Invitational"—only the Atlanta Braves played in more consecutive LCS, in eight straight National League Championship Series from 1991–1998 (the 1994 postseason was cancelled due to the players' strike).

Game 1 at Minute Maid Park

Game 1 of the ALCS featured the Astros' Justin Verlander going up against Jameson Taillon for the Yankees. Harrison Bader got the scoring started with a solo home run in the top of the second. It was his fourth home run of the postseason, becoming the first Yankee player to hit four home runs in their first six postseason games. The Astros responded in the bottom half of the inning when Martín Maldonado drove in Chas McCormick with an RBI double to tie the game at one. After some early trouble, Verlander settled in and went on to strikeout 11 in six innings, giving up only the one run. Taillon was taken out in the fifth after giving up a double to Jeremy Peña, finishing with 4 1/3 innings pitched. Clarke Schmidt, who was brought on in relief, would walk the bases loaded before getting Kyle Tucker to ground into an inning-ending double play. Yuli Gurriel grabbed the lead back for the Astros in the sixth with a lead-off homer, shortly followed by another home run by McCormick to bring the score to 3–1. Peña would also homer in the seventh to cap off his night, going 3–4 with two doubles and a homer and pushing the lead to 4–1. Anthony Rizzo hit a solo shot off of Rafael Montero in the eighth and the Yankees threatened with a single by Giancarlo Stanton and two-out walk by Josh Donaldson to bring the go-ahead run to the plate. Ryan Pressly was called on for the four-out save and struck out Matt Carpenter to end the eighth and finished the off the game with a perfect ninth to give the Astros a 1–0 series lead. The Yankees struck out a total of 17 times in the game while the Astros struck out twice. The 15 strikeout difference between the two teams was the largest differential in postseason history.

Game 2 at Minute Maid Park

In Game 2, the Astros gave the ball to co-ace Framber Valdez while the Yankees turned to Luis Severino. Alex Bregman gave the Astros a 3–0 lead with a 3-run home run in the 3rd. However, the Yankees responded right back, scoring 2 on a groundout and infield single following a single from Aaron Judge & double error from Valdez to make it 3–2 after 3 1/2. Severino was pulled after 5 1/3 allowing 3 runs on 5 hits. Meanwhile, Valdez went 7 strong innings, allowing 2 runs on 4 hits. Bryan Abreu issued a 1 out walk but worked a clean 8th inning. Yankees reliever Jonathan Loáisiga worked 2 scoreless innings before being pulled for reliever Wandy Peralta with 1 out in the 8th. Peralta allowed 2 hits but otherwise worked a clean 8th. After a delay in the beginning of the 9th, Astros closer Ryan Pressly came in and got the first 2 outs then issued a 2 out walk to Josh Donaldson before striking out Matt Carpenter to end the game and give the Astros a 2–0 series lead.

Game 3 at Yankee Stadium

The ACLS shifted to a hostile environment in The Bronx at Yankee Stadium for Game 3, where the Astros posed Cristian Javier to face Yankees ace Gerrit Cole in a rematch of the Astros' no-hitter on June 25. Outfielder Chas McCormick got the scoring started with a 2-out, 2-run home run to right field after Yankees outfielder Harrison Bader dropped a fly ball off the bat of catcher Christian Vázquez which resulted in an error. After 10 1/3 consecutive no-hit innings at Yankee Stadium dating back to the June 25th game, Javier gave up his first hit, a 1-out double to Giancarlo Stanton in the fourth. However, Javier retired the next two batters to end the fourth and strand Stanton at 2nd. After beginning the postseason 0-for-25, Jose Altuve hit a one-out double to right field to break the slump but was stranded at 3rd. After 2 hits and a walk in the sixth, Cole was removed after five-plus innings and replaced by Lou Trivino. Trey Mancini drove in another run with a sacrifice fly and Vazquez drove in two runs to make it 5–0 Houston and closed the book on Gerrit Cole, as he gave up five runs on five hits in five innings plus three batters in the sixth. Javier was replaced by Héctor Neris with 1 out in the 6th. Javier went 5 1/3, allowing 1 hit and 3 walks. Hunter Brown came on in the 8th, walked the first two hitters and got the next two outs before being replaced by Rafael Montero, who recorded the final out of the eighth inning. Bryan Abreu came on in relief of Montero in the 9th inning and recorded the first 2 outs of the inning before giving up back to back hits to Matt Carpenter & Harrison Bader. Abreu then retired Josh Donaldson to give the Astros a 5–0 win and a commanding 3–0 series lead.

Game 4 at Yankee Stadium

Game 4 of the series began in a rain delay and first pitch was delayed to 8:30 ET. The Astros sent out Lance McCullers Jr. while the Yankees countered with Nestor Cortés Jr. The Yankees got on the board in the 1st after Harrison Bader lead off with a single. A flyout and HBP later, Giancarlo Stanton hit a sharp single to drive in Bader. The next batter, Gleyber Torres, blooped a single in right field to drive in Rizzo and make it 2–0 Yankees before McCullers retired the next two batters and end the first inning. In the 2nd, Rizzo added another run on an RBI double which scored Isiah Kiner-Falefa to make it 3–0. In the third, things unraveled for Cortés as he walked Martín Maldonado and Jose Altuve to begin the inning before Jeremy Peña crushed a towering game-tying 3 run home run. Cortés left the game after that with a left groin injury, being replaced by reliever Wandy Peralta. The Astros took the lead a couple of batters later as Yuli Gurriel drove in Yordan Alvarez to make it 4–3 Astros after three innings. Rizzo would tie the game back up on an RBI single, scoring Bader. Peralta would record two innings of 1 run ball before giving way to Jonathan Loáisiga. McCullers worked 5 innings, allowing four runs (three earned) as reliever Héctor Neris replaced him in the sixth inning. Bader hit a 2 out solo homer in the sixth to give the Yankees a 5–4 lead. The Astros responded in the top of the seventh with an RBI single from Alvarez to tie the game at 5–5. Bregman then gave Houston the lead with an RBI single to make it 6–5. Yankees reliever Clay Holmes held the Astros scoreless from there as he went 2 2/3. Astros closer Ryan Pressly came in to pitch in the 9th and recorded a 1-2-3 inning to give the Astros their 2nd consecutive AL pennant and fourth in their last six seasons. Jeremy Peña won the ALCS Most Valuable Player Award (MVP), going 6-for-17 (.353) with 2 home runs.

Game 1, October 19 at Minute Maid Park

October 19, 2022 6:37 pm (CDT) at Minute Maid Park in Houston, Texas
Team	1	2	3	4	5	6	7	8	9	R	H	E
New York	0	1	0	0	0	0	0	1	0	2	5	0
Houston	0	1	0	0	0	2	1	0	X	4	7	1
WP: Justin Verlander (1–0) LP: Clarke Schmidt (0–2) Sv: Ryan Pressly (2); Home runs: NYY: Harrison Bader (4), Anthony Rizzo (2); HOU: Yuli Gurriel (2), Chas McCormick (1), Jeremy Peña (2); Attendance: 41,487; Boxscore

Game 2, October 20 at Minute Maid Park

October 20, 2022 6:37 pm (CDT) at Minute Maid Park in Houston, Texas
Team	1	2	3	4	5	6	7	8	9	R	H	E
New York	0	0	0	2	0	0	0	0	0	2	4	0
Houston	0	0	3	0	0	0	0	0	X	3	8	2
WP: Framber Valdez (1–0) LP: Luis Severino (0–1) Sv: Ryan Pressly (3); Home runs: NYY: None; HOU: Alex Bregman (2); Attendance: 41,700; Boxscore

Game 3, October 22 at Yankee Stadium

October 22, 2022 5:07 pm (EDT) at Yankee Stadium in The Bronx, New York
Team	1	2	3	4	5	6	7	8	9	R	H	E
Houston	0	2	0	0	0	3	0	0	0	5	6	0
New York	0	0	0	0	0	0	0	0	0	0	3	1
WP: Cristian Javier (1–0) LP: Gerrit Cole (2–1); Home runs: HOU: Chas McCormick (2); NYY: None; Attendance: 47,569; Boxscore

Game 4, October 23 at Yankee Stadium

October 23, 2022 8:30 pm (EDT) at Yankee Stadium in Bronx, New York
Team	1	2	3	4	5	6	7	8	9	R	H	E
Houston	0	0	4	0	0	0	2	0	0	6	9	0
New York	2	1	0	1	0	1	0	0	0	5	9	1
WP: Héctor Neris (2–0) LP: Jonathan Loáisiga (0–1) Sv: Ryan Pressly (4); Home runs: HOU: Jeremy Peña (3); NYY: Harrison Bader (5); Attendance: 46,545; Boxscore

=== World Series ===
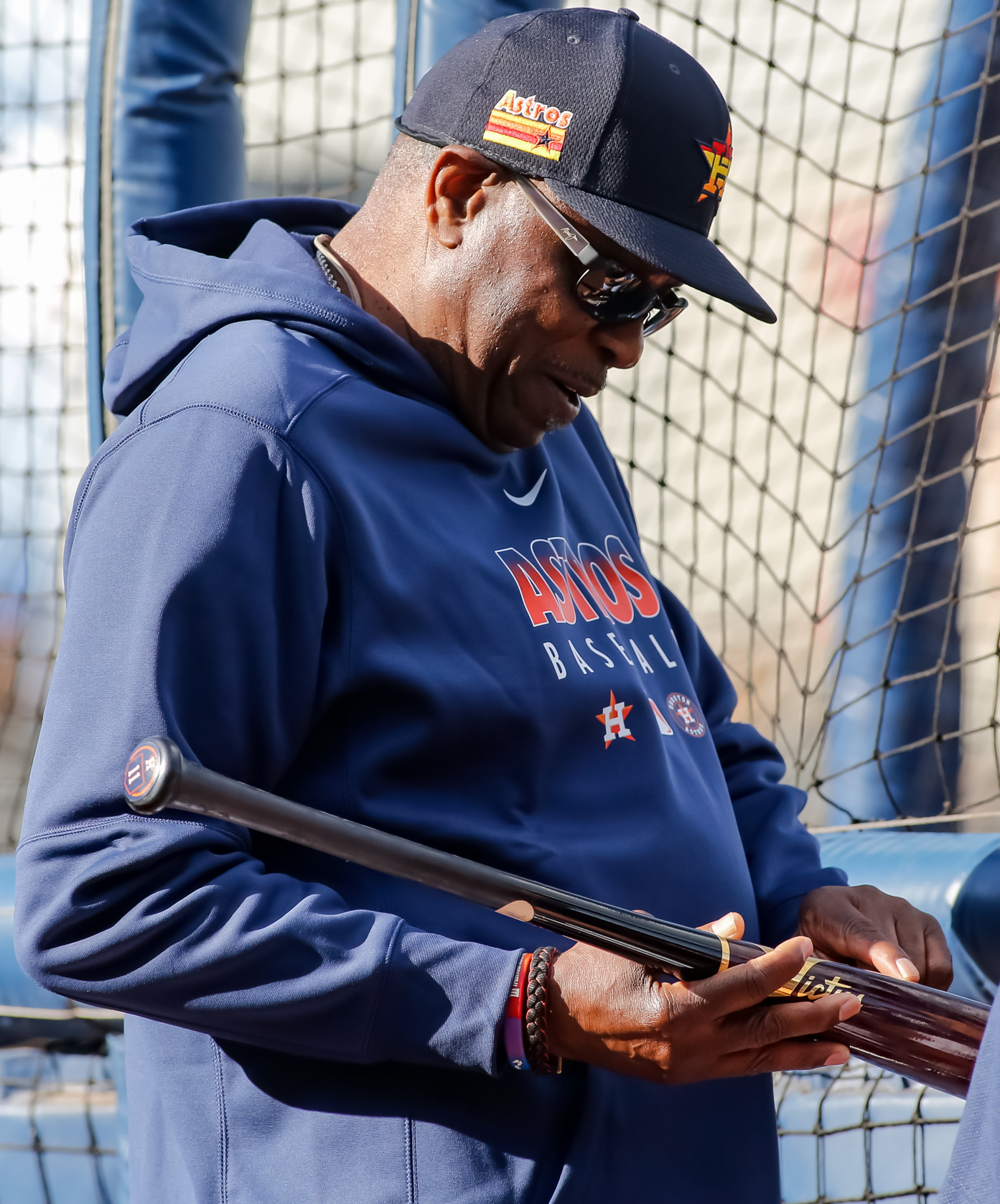
Astros manager Dusty Baker won his first World Series championship since 1981, and first as manager.

Game 1 at Minute Maid Park

The Astros, who faced the Phillies in their final regular season series, met the now-National League champions in the World Series. In Game 1, Kyle Tucker hit a two-run and a three-run home in consecutive innings versus Phillies starter Aaron Nola to build a 5–0 lead after three innings. Tucker became the first Astros player to hit a multi-home run game in World Series play. Astros starting pitcher Justin Verlander retired the first nine Phillies batters he faced but was unable to hold the lead and departed after allowing the tying runs. Luis García, making his first appearance since earning the win in the ALDS finale versus Seattle, allowed a home run in the top of the tenth inning to J. T. Realmuto that stood as the game-winner for Philadelphia, 6–5.

Game 2 at Minute Maid Park

Within the first four pitches of the game and an error in Game 2, the Astros took care of all scoring necessary to secure a 5–2 win that mimicked the blueprint of many of their 106 wins during the regular season. The top of their lineup did much of the damage, starting pitching was stifling, and the bullpen secured the win. Each of Altuve, Peña, and Alvarez hit consecutive doubles off Phillies starter Zach Wheeler to open the contest; leading a game off with three consecutive extra base hits was unprecedented in World Series history. Astros starter Framber Valdez allowed one run over 6 1/3 innings, striking out nine, getting nine ground ball outs, and allowing a Bryce Harper line drive as the only out in the air. Alex Bregman hit a two-run home run in the fifth inning for his third home run of the postseason.

Major League Baseball announced merchandising sales records established by Astros team sh0ps during the 2022 World Series. During Games 1 the Astros' nine retail outlets within Union Station and Minute Maid Park recorded the highest single-day merchandise sale total in World Series history, surpassing those during an 18-inning contest at Dodger Stadium between the Red Sox and Dodgers in 2018. Game 2 achieved the second-highest total on record. Thus, the Astros held the four highest sales totals during the World Series, to include both Games 1 of the 2019 and 2021 World Series.

Game 3 at Citizens Bank Park

The series shifted to Philadelphia for Game 3, which was scheduled to take place on October 31, but was postponed to November 1 due to rain. The Phillies hit Astros starter Lance McCullers Jr. hard for seven runs on five home runs en route to a 7–0 win. The Phillies got the scoring started with a 2-out, 2-run homer from Bryce Harper and never looked back, getting homers from Alec Bohm, Brandon Marsh, Kyle Schwarber and Rhys Hoskins to back starter Ranger Suárez. Bohm's home run represented a milestone in World Series history as the 1,000th hit all-time. The five home runs represented another milestone and record, albeit dubiously for McCullers, who became the first pitcher to allow that many in a World Series contest. Suárez, who worked 5 scoreless innings and struck out four, was the winning pitcher as Philadelphia mounted a 2–1 Series lead.

Game 4 at Citizens Bank Park

In Game 4, Aaron Nola made his second start of the series for the Phillies, while Cristian Javier started for the Astros. The Astros and Phillies remained scoreless through four innings until the Astros loaded the bases in the top of the fifth inning against Nola. José Alvarado relieved Nola and hit Yordan Alvarez with a pitch, scoring the game's first run and breaking a 16-innings scoreless streak for Houston. The next batter, Alex Bregman hit a two-RBI double, Kyle Tucker followed with an RBI sacrifice fly, and then Yuli Gurriel hit a single to score Bregman. Javier threw six innings without allowing a hit, striking out nine batters and walking two. He was relieved by Bryan Abreu, who struck out the side in the seventh inning. Rafael Montero pitched a hitless eighth inning for the Astros. Ryan Pressly pitched in the ninth inning for the Astros despite giving up a walk, completing the no-hitter. It was the first combined no-hitter in World Series history, and the second no-hitter in World Series history after Don Larsen's perfect game in the 1956 World Series.

Game 5 at Citizens Bank Park

Game 5 coincided with a Thursday Night Football game between the Philadelphia Eagles and the Houston Texans, the NFL franchises of the World Series cities. Noah Syndergaard started for the Phillies and Justin Verlander started for the Astros. The Phillies wore the throwback uniforms from the 1970s and 1980s while the Astros wore their orange uniforms.

Jose Altuve led off the game with a double, advanced to third base on an error, and scored on a single by Jeremy Peña. Kyle Schwarber led off the bottom of the first inning with a home run. Peña hit a home run to put the Astros at a lead of 2–1 in the top of the fourth inning. In the top of the 8th inning, Altuve scored from the third base with an RBI groundout tag by Yordan Alvarez, widening the Astros' lead at 3–1. In the bottom of the 8th inning, Nick Castellanos scored with an RBI single by Jean Segura, narrowing the Astros' lead to 3–2. Ryan Pressly entered to try for a five-out save, his fourth appearance in the series. He recorded a strikeout and a hard-hit groundout to Trey Mancini to end the eighth inning. In the ninth inning, Chas McCormick made a leaping catch at the right-center wall on a flyball hit by J. T. Realmuto that prevented a likely extra-base hit to make the second out. Bryce Harper was hit by a pitch not long after to get the tying run on first base, but Castellanos hit a groundball to short that led to the game-ending putout by Peña to Mancini to end the game. The victory was the first World Series pitching win of Verlander's career, having gone 0–6 in his previous eight World Series starts, including Game 1.

McCormick's landing after catching Realmuto's fly ball left a starfish-shaped imprint on the warning track dirt with such vivid detail that a uniform number 20 was legible. Photographed by Flip Lehman, the image was shared more than 7,500 times within 12 hours on the Traces of Texas Facebook page, and more than 2,000 times from the Astros' official Twitter feed.

Game 6 at Minute Maid Park

Game 6 of the Series will set a record for the latest date a Major League Baseball game is played. The latest a World Series game was November 4, in both the 2001 World Series and 2009 World Series In a rematch from Game 2, Framber Valdez will start for the Astros, while Zack Wheeler will start for the Phillies. Prior to the game, the Astros removed first baseman Yuli Gurriel from the roster due to a knee injury he sustained in Game 5. He was replaced by rookie catcher Korey Lee. The game remained scoreless through five innings, when Kyle Schwarber lasered a solo home run to right field for the Phillies in the top of the sixth inning. Wheeler allowed two Astros to reach base and was relieved by José Alvarado, who allowed a three-run home run to Yordan Alvarez. Later in the inning, Christian Vázquez hit an RBI single, scoring Alex Bregman. Relievers Héctor Neris, Bryan Abreu and Ryan Pressly each worked scoreless innings and sealed the Astros first World Series title since the controversial 2017 World Series win. Reliever Will Smith joined Joc Pederson, Jack Morris, Ryan Theriot, Jake Peavy and Ben Zobrist as the only players to win back 2 back World Series' on two different teams.

During the Astros' championship run, the Astros bullpen became the first to hurl at least 40 innings and allow an ERA of less than 1.00 (0.83), per ESPN Stats & Info, and also surpassed the 1973 Oakland Athletics (1.05) for lowest with a minimum 35 innings, per MLB.com.

As a result of the Astros' championship season, furniture store owner "Mattress Mack" Jim McIngvale was awarded $75 million in total sports betting payouts—the highest total in sports betting history—from a total of $10 million placed earlier in the season.

Game 1, October 28 at Minute Maid Park

October 28, 2022 7:03 pm (CDT) at Minute Maid Park in Houston, Texas
Team	1	2	3	4	5	6	7	8	9	10	R	H	E
Philadelphia	0	0	0	3	2	0	0	0	0	1	6	9	0
Houston	0	2	3	0	0	0	0	0	0	0	5	10	0
WP: Seranthony Domínguez (2–0) LP: Luis García (1–1) Sv: David Robertson (1); Home runs: PHI: J. T. Realmuto (3); HOU: Kyle Tucker 2 (3); Attendance: 42,903; Boxscore

Game 2, October 29 at Minute Maid Park

October 29, 2022 7:03 pm (CDT) at Minute Maid Park in Houston, Texas
Team	1	2	3	4	5	6	7	8	9	R	H	E
Philadelphia	0	0	0	0	0	0	1	0	1	2	6	1
Houston	3	0	0	0	2	0	0	0	X	5	7	2
WP: Framber Valdez (2–0) LP: Zack Wheeler (1–2); Home runs: PHI: None; HOU: Alex Bregman (3); Attendance: 42,926; Boxscore

Game 3, November 1 at Citizens Bank Park

November 1, 2022 8:03 pm (EDT) at Citizens Bank Park in Philadelphia, Pennsylvania
Team	1	2	3	4	5	6	7	8	9	R	H	E
Houston	0	0	0	0	0	0	0	0	0	0	5	0
Philadelphia	2	2	0	0	3	0	0	0	X	7	7	0
WP: Ranger Suárez (2–0) LP: Lance McCullers Jr. (0–1); Home runs: HOU: None; PHI: Bryce Harper (6), Alec Bohm (1), Brandon Marsh (2), Kyle Schwarber (4), Rhys Hoskins (6); Attendance: 45,712; Boxscore

Game 4, November 2 at Citizens Bank Park

November 2, 2022 8:03 pm (EDT) at Citizens Bank Park in Philadelphia, Pennsylvania
Team	1	2	3	4	5	6	7	8	9	R	H	E
Houston	0	0	0	0	5	0	0	0	0	5	10	0
Philadelphia	0	0	0	0	0	0	0	0	0	0	0	0
WP: Cristian Javier (2–0) LP: Aaron Nola (2–2); Attendance: 45,693; Boxscore

Game 5, November 3 at Citizens Bank Park

November 3, 2022 8:03 pm (EDT) at Citizens Bank Park in Philadelphia, Pennsylvania
Team	1	2	3	4	5	6	7	8	9	R	H	E
Houston	1	0	0	1	0	0	0	1	0	3	9	0
Philadelphia	1	0	0	0	0	0	0	1	0	2	6	1
WP: Justin Verlander (2–0) LP: Noah Syndergaard (0–1) Sv: Ryan Pressly (5); Home runs: HOU: Jeremy Peña (4); PHI: Kyle Schwarber (5); Attendance: 45,693; Boxscore

Game 6, November 5 at Minute Maid Park

November 5, 2022 7:03 pm (CDT) at Minute Maid Park in Houston, Texas
Team	1	2	3	4	5	6	7	8	9	R	H	E
Philadelphia	0	0	0	0	0	1	0	0	0	1	3	1
Houston	0	0	0	0	0	4	0	0	X	4	7	0
WP: Framber Valdez (3–0) LP: Zack Wheeler (1–3) Sv: Ryan Pressly (6); Home runs: PHI: Kyle Schwarber (6); HOU: Yordan Alvarez (3); Attendance: 42,958; Boxscore

=== Postseason rosters ===
Playoff rosters
American League Division Series

- Pitchers: 35 Justin Verlander 43 Lance McCullers Jr. 45 Ryne Stanek 47 Rafael Montero 50 Héctor Neris 52 Bryan Abreu 53 Cristian Javier 55 Ryan Pressly 58 Hunter Brown 59 Framber Valdez 65 José Urquidy 77 Luis García
- Catchers: 9 Christian Vázquez 15 Martín Maldonado
- Infielders: 2 Alex Bregman 3 Jeremy Peña 10 Yuli Gurriel 16 Aledmys Díaz 17 David Hensley 26 Trey Mancini 27 Jose Altuve
- Outfielders: 6 Jake Meyers 14 Mauricio Dubón 20 Chas McCormick 30 Kyle Tucker 44 Yordan Alvarez

American League Championship Series

- Pitchers: 35 Justin Verlander 43 Lance McCullers Jr. 45 Ryne Stanek 47 Rafael Montero 50 Héctor Neris 52 Bryan Abreu 53 Cristian Javier 55 Ryan Pressly 58 Hunter Brown 59 Framber Valdez 61 Seth Martinez 65 José Urquidy 77 Luis García
- Catchers: 9 Christian Vázquez 15 Martín Maldonado
- Infielders: 2 Alex Bregman 3 Jeremy Peña 10 Yuli Gurriel 16 Aledmys Díaz 17 David Hensley 26 Trey Mancini 27 Jose Altuve
- Outfielders: 14 Mauricio Dubón 20 Chas McCormick 30 Kyle Tucker 44 Yordan Alvarez

World Series

- Pitchers: 35 Justin Verlander 43 Lance McCullers Jr. 45 Ryne Stanek 47 Rafael Montero 50 Héctor Neris 51 Will Smith 52 Bryan Abreu 53 Cristian Javier 55 Ryan Pressly 58 Hunter Brown 59 Framber Valdez 65 José Urquidy 77 Luis García
- Catchers: 9 Christian Vázquez 15 Martín Maldonado 38 Korey Lee (Game 6)
- Infielders: 2 Alex Bregman 3 Jeremy Peña 10 Yuli Gurriel (Games 1–5) 16 Aledmys Díaz 17 David Hensley 26 Trey Mancini 27 Jose Altuve
- Outfielders: 14 Mauricio Dubón 20 Chas McCormick 30 Kyle Tucker 44 Yordan Alvarez

== Transactions ==
=== Players ===
==== Free agents ====
Free agents

Major League free agents

Following 2021 World Series
Carlos Correa (SS)^{†}	Astros electing free agency November 3, 2021 Contracts expired after World Series	Signed with Minnesota Twins 3 years, $105.3 million March 18, 2022
Yimi García (RHP)	Astros electing free agency November 3, 2021 Contracts expired after World Series	Signed with Toronto Blue Jays 2 years, $11 million November 27, 2021
Marwin González (IF)	Astros electing free agency November 3, 2021 Contracts expired after World Series	Signed with New York Yankees Minors deal
Kendall Graveman (RHP)	Astros electing free agency November 3, 2021 Contracts expired after World Series	Signed with Chicago White Sox 3 years, $24 million November 30, 2021
Zack Greinke (SP)	Astros electing free agency November 3, 2021 Contracts expired after World Series	Signed with Kansas City Royals 1 year, $13 million March 16, 2022
Brooks Raley (RHP)	Astros electing free agency November 3, 2021 Contracts expired after World Series	Signed with Tampa Bay Rays 2 years, $10 million November 29, 2021
Justin Verlander (SP)^{†}	Astros electing free agency November 3, 2021 Contracts expired after World Series	Resigned with Houston Astros December 13, 2021 1 year, $25 million Player option for 2023: 1 year, $25 million
Incoming free agents
Héctor Neris (RHP)	Departed Philadelphia Phillies November 3, 2021 Contract expired	Signed with Houston Astros November 27, 2021 2 years, $17 million Club option for 2024
Niko Goodrum (UT)	Departed Detroit Tigers November 6, 2021 Designated for assignment	Signed with Houston Astros March 15, 2022 1 year, $2.1 million
^{†}—Extended qualifying offer by Astros as of November 7, 2021, of which both Correa and Verlander rejected. The value of the qualifying offer, at $18.4 million, was determined by averaging the top 125 salaries of MLB players in 2021.

Minor league free agents

- March 13, 2022: Signed outfielder Lewis Brinson to minor league contract.
- March 15, 2022: Signed pitcher Zac Rosscup to one-year minor league contract.
- March 22, 2022: Signed infielder Franklin Barreto to minor league contract. Released by Astros on August 10, 2022.
- July 20, 2022: Signed international free agent LHP Fernando Silvera (Cuba)

==== Options ====
Player options

November 4, 2021	Yuli Gurriel (1B) $8,000,000 team option for 2022	Club option Exercised
August 4, 2022	Justin Verlander (SP) $25,000,000 conditional option for 2023	Player option Vested (Note: The option was contingent on Verlander reaching 130 innings pitched, which occurred during the contest versus the Cleveland Guardians.)
August 21, 2022	Martín Maldonado (C) $4,500,000 conditional option for 2022	Club option Vested (Note: The option was contingent on Maldonado making 90 appearances, which occurred during the contest versus the Atlanta Braves.)

==== Arbitration process ====
Arbitration-eligible players

Player	Pos.	Tendered	Hearing	Agreed	Salary	Arb. year	Free agent	Ref.
Aledmys Díaz	INF	November 30, 2021	No	March 22, 2022	$4,450,000	3	2023	
Rafael Montero	RHP	November 30, 2021	No	March 22, 2022	$2,275,000	3	2023	
Ryne Stanek	RHP	November 30, 2021	No	March 22, 2022	$2,100,000	2	2024	
Phil Maton	RHP	November 30, 2021	No	March 22, 2022	$1,550,000	2	2024	
Josh James	RHP	November 30, 2021	No	March 22, 2022	$800,000	1	2025	
Framber Valdez	LHP	November 30, 2021	No	March 22, 2022	$3,000,000	1	2026	

==== 40-man roster ====
Roster moves

November 19, 2021	Added: Infielders Jeremy Peña and Joe Perez, Pitchers Shawn Dubin (right-hander) and Jonathan Bermúdez (left-hander)
November 19, 2021	Claimed off waivers: Pitcher Kent Emanuel (left-hander) — to Philadelphia Phillies
August 20, 2022	Designated for assignment: Pitcher Jonathan Bermudez (left-hander)
September 1, 2022	Designated for assignment: Outfielder Niko Goodrum; Pitcher Peter Solomon

==== Injury report ====
Injury report

Player	Role	Injury type	Start	Completion	Notes	Ref.
Justin Verlander	Pit.	UCL reconstruction (right)	July 26, 2020	April 7, 2022	Recovered and physically able to play in time for Opening Day	
Lance McCullers Jr.	Pit.	Flexor tendon strain (right)	November 2, 2021	August 13, 2022	Injured during 2021 ALDS	
Jake Meyers	Pos.	Shoulder labrum tear (left)	November 2, 2021	June 24, 2022	Injured during 2021 ALDS	
Alex Bregman	Pos.	Wrist surgery (right)	November 8, 2021	April 7, 2022	Recovered and physically able to play in time for Opening Day	
Shawn Dubin	Pit.	Forearm strain (right)	April 7, 2022	August 17, 2022		
Blake Taylor	Pit.	Elbow discomfort (left)	June 4, 2022	September 13, 2022	To 15-day IL on June 4, to 60-day IL on July 1	
Parker Mushinski	Pit.	Elbow discomfort (left)	June 7, 2022	July 21, 2022		
Michael Brantley	Pos.	Shoulder discomfort (right)	June 27, 2022	Out for season	Underwent shoulder surgery on August 12	
Jason Castro	Pos.	Knee discomfort (left)	July 1, 2022	Out for season	Underwent knee surgery on August 2	
Yordan Alvarez	Pos.	Hand inflammation (right)	July 10, 2022	July 21, 2022	First reported during game on June 18, 2022	
Aledmys Díaz	Pos.	Groin (left)	August 19, 2022	September 13, 2022		
Ryan Pressly	Pit.	Neck stiffness	August 25, 2022	September 9, 2022		
Justin Verlander	Pit.	Calf muscle fascial tear (right)	August 28, 2022	September 16, 2022		

=== Managerial and coaching staff ===
Non-player personnel

Brent Strom	Departed Houston Astros Pitching coach November 2, 2021	Hired by Arizona Diamondbacks To Pitching coach November 21, 2021
Dusty Baker	Houston Astros Manager	Remained with Houston Astros Agreed to one-year extension November 5, 2021

Other

- Pete Putila (assistant general manager) to San Francisco Giants as general manager
- Oz Ocampo (international cross-checker, scouting) to Miami Marlins as assistant general manager

== Roster ==
2022 Houston Astros
Roster
Pitchers: 52,66 Bryan Abreu; 52 Pedro Báez; 64 Brandon Bielak; 56 Ronel Blanco; 58 Hunter Brown; 77 Luis Garcia; 53 Cristian Javier; 61 Seth Martinez; 88 Phil Maton; 43 Lance McCullers Jr.; 47 Rafael Montero; 67 Parker Mushinski; 50 Héctor Neris; 17 Jake Odorizzi; 48 Enoli Paredes; 55 Ryan Pressly; 51 Will Smith; 45 Ryne Stanek; 62 Blake Taylor; 65 José Urquidy; 59 Framber Valdez; 35 Justin Verlander	Catchers: 18 Jason Castro; 63 Yainer Díaz; 38 Korey Lee; 15 Martín Maldonado; 9 Christian Vázquez; Infielders: 27 Jose Altuve; 2 Alex Bregman; 16 Aledmys Díaz; 11 Niko Goodrum; 10 Yuli Gurriel; 17 David Hensley; 26 Trey Mancini; 13 J. J. Matijevic; 3 Jeremy Peña; 31 Joe Perez	Outfielders: 44 Yordan Alvarez; 23 Michael Brantley; 14 Mauricio Dubón; 20 Chas McCormick; 6 Jake Meyers; 26 Jose Siri; 30 Kyle Tucker; Other batters: 28 Taylor Jones	Manager: 12 Dusty Baker; Coaches: 85 Javier Bracamonte (bullpen catcher); 37 Alex Cintrón (hitting); 29 Michael Collins (coach); 19 Joe Espada (bench); 54 Dan Firova (quality control); 41 Jason Kanzler; 22 Omar López (first base); 36 Josh Miller (pitching); 95 Bill Murphy (bullpen); 8 Gary Pettis (third base); 46 Troy Snitker (hitting)

== Player statistics ==
Table legend
*	Left-handed batter or pitcher	League leader (Bold: MLB leader)
#	Switch hitter	League top ten
	Leader in appearances at position	Team leader

=== Batting ===
Statistics legend
⌖	Position	AB	At bats	2B	Doubles	RBI	Runs batted in	SB	Stolen bases	SLG	Slugging percentage
G	Games played	R	Runs scored	3B	Triples	BB	Bases on balls	AVG	Batting average	OPS	On-base plus slugging percentage
PA	Plate appearances	H	Hits	HR	Home runs	SO	Strikeouts	OBP	On-base percentage

==== Regular season results ====
⌖	Player	G	PA	AB	R	H	2B	3B	HR	RBI	SB	BB	SO	AVG	OBP	SLG	OPS
C	Martín Maldonado	113	379	344	40	64	12	0	15	45	0	22	116	.186	.248	.352	.600
1B	Yuli Gurriel	146	584	545	53	132	40	0	8	53	8	30	73	.242	.288	.360	.647
2B	Jose Altuve	141	604	527	103	158	39	0	28	57	18	66	87	.300	.387	.533	.921
3B	Alex Bregman	155	656	548	93	142	38	0	23	93	1	87	77	.259	.366	.454	.820
SS	Jeremy Peña	136	558	521	72	132	22	2	22	63	11	22	135	.253	.289	.426	.715
LF	Michael Brantley*	64	277	243	28	70	14	1	5	26	1	31	30	.288	.370	.416	.785
OF	Chas McCormick	119	407	359	47	88	12	2	14	44	4	46	104	.245	.332	.407	.738
RF	Kyle Tucker*	150	609	544	71	140	28	1	30	107	25	59	95	.257	.330	.478	.808
DH	Yordan Alvarez*	135	561	470	95	144	29	2	37	97	1	78	106	.306	.406	.613	1.019
UT	Aledmys Díaz	92	327	305	35	74	13	0	12	38	1	18	53	.243	.287	.403	.691
CF	Mauricio Dubón	83	216	197	21	41	8	0	3	16	2	12	26	.208	.254	.294	.548
DH	Trey Mancini	51	186	165	17	29	7	0	8	22	0	18	49	.176	.258	.364	.622
CF	Jake Meyers	52	160	150	13	34	6	2	1	15	2	7	54	.227	.269	.313	.582
CF	José Siri	48	147	135	18	24	4	2	3	10	6	9	48	.178	.238	.304	.542
C	Christian Vázquez	35	108	104	8	26	3	0	1	10	0	4	18	.250	.278	.308	.585
C	Jason Castro*	34	88	78	6	9	2	0	1	3	1	8	40	.115	.205	.179	.384
DH	J. J. Matijevic*	21	48	44	5	7	2	0	2	4	1	2	17	.159	.229	.341	.570
IF	Niko Goodrum^{#}	15	45	43	2	5	2	0	0	1	1	2	23	.116	.156	.163	.318
UT	David Hensley	16	34	29	7	10	2	1	1	5	0	5	6	.345	.441	.586	1.027
C	Korey Lee	8	16	15	1	4	2	0	0	4	0	1	4	.267	.313	.400	.713
3B	Joe Perez	1	1	1	0	0	0	0	0	0	0	0	1	.000	.000	.000	.000
2B	Taylor Jones	1	1	1	0	0	0	0	0	0	0	0	0	.000	.000	.000	.000
Batting totals		162	6054	5409	737	1341	284	13	214	715	83	528	1179	.248	.319	.424	.743
AL rank			8	12	3	6	4	11	2		7	3	2	5	4	3	3
RC & SECA (Astros): • RC & SECA (AL teams): • Batting WAR (AL teams):

==== Postseason results ====
Player	G	PA	AB	R	H	2B	3B	HR	RBI	SB	BB	SO	AVG	OBP	SLG	OPS	cWPA
Jose Altuve	13	62	58	8	11	3	0	0	0	1	4	14	.190	.242	.241	.483	−8.92%
Jeremy Peña	13	61	58	12	20	5	0	4	8	0	2	15	.345	.367	.638	1.005	20.03%
Yordan Alvarez *	13	61	52	9	10	3	0	3	**14**	0	6	16	.192	.311	.423	.735	21.32%
Alex Bregman	13	58	51	7	15	5	0	3	11	1	6	5	.294	.379	.569	.948	13.80%
Kyle Tucker *	13	57	49	4	10	1	0	3	6	1	7	14	.204	.298	.408	.706	−7.94%
Yuli Gurriel	12	50	49	4	17	1	0	2	4	2	1	1	.347	.360	.490	.850	8.37%
Chas McCormick	12	46	39	5	9	0	0	2	3	0	5	15	.231	.333	.385	.718	−7.41%
Martín Maldonado	11	33	29	2	6	1	0	0	2	0	2	11	.207	.303	.241	.544	1.01%
Trey Mancini	8	24	21	0	1	0	0	0	1	0	1	8	.048	.125	.048	.173	−6.95%
Aledmys Díaz	8	23	22	0	1	1	0	0	0	0	0	6	.045	.087	.091	.178	−17.42%
Christian Vázquez	6	19	17	1	4	0	0	0	3	0	1	6	.235	.316	.235	.551	−3.14%
David Hensley	4	9	8	0	2	0	0	0	0	0	0	4	.250	.333	.250	.583	−2.22%
Jake Meyers	2	2	2	1	0	0	0	0	0	0	0	1	.000	.000	.000	.000	−0.35%
Mauricio Dubón	6	0	0	0	0	0	0	0	0	0	0	0					
Batting totals	13	505	455	53	106	20	0	17	52	5	35	118	.233	.302	.389	.691	
Note: Batting leaders considered among all players who participated in postseason. • Sources:

=== Pitching ===
Statistics legend
⌖	Pitching role	ERA	Earned run average	GF	Games finished	IP	Innings pitched	ER	Earned runs allowed	WHIP	Walks plus hits per inning pitched
W	Wins	G	Games pitched	SV	Saves	H	Hits allowed	BB	Base on balls	K/BB	Strikeout-to-walk ratio
L	Losses	GS	Games started	HD	Holds	R	Runs allowed	SO	Strikeouts

==== Regular season results ====
⌖	Player	W	L	ERA	G	GS	GF	QS	HD	SV	IP	H	ER	BB	SO	WHIP
SP	Framber Valdez*	17	6	2.82	31	31	0	**26**	0	0	201.1	166	63	67	194	1.157
SP	Justin Verlander	18	4	**1.75**	28	28	0	21	0	0	175.0	116	34	29	185	**0.829**
SP	José Urquidy	13	8	3.94	29	28	0	15	0	0	164.1	154	72	38	134	1.168
SP	Luis García	15	8	3.72	28	28	0	10	0	0	157.1	131	65	47	157	1.131
SP	Cristian Javier	11	9	2.54	30	25	0	11	1	0	148.2	89	42	52	194	0.948
SP	Jake Odorizzi	4	3	3.75	12	12	0	4	0	0	60.0	52	25	17	46	1.150
CL	Ryan Pressly	3	3	2.98	50	0	43	0	0	33	48.1	30	16	13	65	0.890
RP	Rafael Montero	5	2	2.37	71	0	25	0	23	14	68.1	47	18	23	73	1.024
RP	Phil Maton	0	2	3.84	67	0	10	0	14	0	65.2	58	28	24	73	1.249
RP	Héctor Neris	6	4	3.72	70	0	26	0	25	3	65.1	48	27	17	79	1.010
RP	Ryne Stanek	2	1	1.15	59	0	10	0	17	1	54.2	36	7	31	62	1.226
RP	Bryan Abreu	4	0	1.94	55	0	18	0	8	2	60.1	45	16	26	88	1.177
	Lance McCullers Jr.	4	2	2.27	8	8	0	5	0	0	47.2	37	12	22	50	1.238
	Seth Martinez	1	1	2.09	29	0	7	0	3	0	38.2	26	9	14	38	1.034
	Will Smith*	0	2	3.27	24	0	6	0	6	0	22.0	23	8	4	24	1.227
	Hunter Brown	2	0	0.89	7	2	0	2	2	0	20.1	15	2	7	22	1.082
	Blake Taylor*	1	1	3.94	19	0	4	0	4	0	16.0	15	7	10	9	1.563
	Brandon Bielak	0	0	3.65	5	0	2	0	1	0	12.2	11	5	4	12	1.216
	Parker Mushinski	0	0	3.68	7	0	1	0	1	0	7.1	5	3	3	8	1.091
	Ronel Blanco	0	0	7.11	7	0	3	0	0	0	6.1	8	5	4	7	1.895
	Enoli Paredes	0	0	3.00	7	0	3	0	0	0	3.0	3	1	1	2	2.000
	Pedro Báez	0	0	11.57	3	0	1	0	0	0	2.1	5	3	3	2	3.429
Pitching totals		106	56	2.90	162	162	159	94	105	53	1445.1	1121	465	458	1524	1.092
AL rank		1	15	1				1		1	5	1	1	7	1	1
QS & Holds (individual): • QS & Hld (AL teams): • Pitching WAR (AL teams):

==== Postseason results ====
Player	W	L	ERA	G	GS	GF	QS	Hd	Sv	IP	H	ER	BB	SO	WHIP	cWPA
Framber Valdez*	**3**	0	1.44	4	4	0	3	0	0	25.0	14	4	8	**33**	0.880	16.23%
Justin Verlander	2	0	5.85	4	4	0	1	0	0	20.0	23	13	8	25	1.550	−3.29%
Lance McCullers Jr.	0	1	5.87	3	3	0	1	0	0	15.1	16	10	4	16	1.238	−9.10%
Cristian Javier	2	0	0.71	3	2	0	1	0	0	12.2	2	1	5	16	0.550	12.94%
Bryan Abreu	0	0	0.00	10	0	1	0	**5**	0	11.1	4	0	4	19	0.706	15.54%
Ryan Pressly	0	0	0.00	10	0	**8**	0	0	**6**	11.0	4	0	3	13	0.636	40.74%
Rafael Montero	1	0	1.93	10	0	1	0	4	0	9.1	5	2	6	10	1.179	−10.65%
Héctor Neris	2	0	1.50	8	0	0	0	3	0	6.0	2	1	0	9	0.333	9.85%
Luis García	1	1	1.59	2	0	1	0	0	0	5.2	4	1	0	6	0.706	−7.07%
Hunter Brown	0	0	0.00	3	0	0	0	0	0	3.2	2	0	3	1	1.364	1.56%
Ryne Stanek	0	0	0.00	4	0	1	0	0	0	3.0	0	0	1	6	0.333	1.91%
Playoff totals	11	2	2.29	13	13	13	6	12	6	126.0	77	32	43	160	0.952	
Note: Pitching leaders considered among all players who participated in postseason. • Sources:

== Major League Baseball draft ==
The 2022 MLB First-Year Player draft was held July 17–19, 2022, in Los Angeles, California, during the All-Star break. The draft order was set based on the reverse order of the 2021 standings. In addition, compensation picks were distributed for players who did not sign from the 2021 MLB draft. The Houston Astros received the 28th selection in each round.

Houston Astros 2022 MLB draft selections
Rd.	Slot	Draftee	Position	School	Origin	Signed	Notes	Bio
1	28	Drew Gilbert	Outfielder	Tennessee • 2022	(Minnesota)	Y	(Note: MLB debut on August 8, 2025)	
2	64	Jacob Melton	Outfielder	Oregon State • 2022	(Oregon)	Y	(Note: MLB debut on June 1, 2025)	
2	80	Andrew Taylor	Pitcher	Central Michigan • 2022	(Michigan)	Y	(Note: Compensation pick for the Minnesota Twins signing Carlos Correa)	
3	103	Michael Knorr	Pitcher	Coastal Carolina • 2022	(California)	Y		
4	133	Trey Dombroski	Pitcher	Monmouth	(New Jersey)	Y		
5	163	Nolan DeVos	Pitcher	Davidson • 2022	(North Carolina)	Y		
6	193	Collin Price	Catcher	Mercer	(Georgia (U.S. state))	Y	(Note: MLB debut on June 4, 2026)	
7	223	AJ Blubaugh	Pitcher	Milwaukee	(Ohio)	Y	(Note: MLB debut on April 30, 2025)	
8	253	Tyler Guilfoil	Pitcher	Kentucky • 2022	(Kentucky)	Y		
9	283	Brent Gillis	Pitcher	Portland	(Washington (state))	Y		
10	313	Zach Cole	Outfielder	Ball State • 2022	(Missouri)	Y	(Note: MLB debut on September 12, 2025)	
11	343	Ryan Clifford	Outfielder	Pro5 Academy (NC)	(North Carolina)	Y		
12	373	Zach Dezenzo	Shortstop	Ohio State	(Ohio)	Y	(Note: MLB debut on August 6, 2024)	
13	403	Jackson Loftin	Shortstop	Oral Roberts	(Texas)	Y		
14	433	Tommy Sacco Jr.	Shortstop	TCU • 2022	(Arizona)	Y		
15	463	Joey Mancini	Pitcher	Boston College	(Connecticut)	Y		
16	493	Tim Borden Jr.	Shortstop	Georgia Tech	(Indiana)	Y		
17	523	Garrett McGowan	First baseman	Pittsburg State	(Missouri)	Y		
18	553	Isaiah Jackson	Outfielder	Cienega High School (AZ)	(Arizona)	N	(Note: Signed with the Los Angeles Angels from the 2025 draft.)	
19	583	John Garcia	Catcher	Grambling State	(New York (state))	Y		
20	613	Ryan Wrobleski	Catcher	Dallas Baptist	(Minnesota)	Y		
–	–	Logan VanWey	Pitcher	Missouri Southern	(Missouri)	Y	(Note: Signed as an undrafted free agent.) (Note: MLB debut on April 11, 2025)	

== Awards and achievements ==
=== Offensive achievements ===
==== Grand slams ====
No.	Date	Astros batter	Venue	Inning	Pitcher	Opposing team	Box
1	May 8	Aledmys Díaz	Minute Maid Park	3 (Note: Tied score or took lead)	Drew Hutchison	Detroit Tigers	
2	May 17	Kyle Tucker	Fenway Park	4	Tyler Danish	Boston Red Sox	
3	June 17	Michael Brantley	Minute Maid Park	6	Matt Foster	Chicago White Sox	
4	July 16	Martín Maldonado	Minute Maid Park	2	Jared Koenig	Oakland Athletics	
5	August 5	Trey Mancini (Note: 1st MLB grand slam)	Progressive Field	3	Hunter Gaddis	Cleveland Guardians	
6	August 9	Aledmys Díaz	Minute Maid Park	4	Martín Pérez	Texas Rangers	
7	August 12	Kyle Tucker	Minute Maid Park	5	Sam Moll	Oakland Athletics	
8	September 11	Alex Bregman	Minute Maid Park	3	Mike Mayers	Los Angeles Angels	

=== Pitching achievements ===
==== Immaculate innings ====
Date	Pitchers	Inn.	Sw.	Ctc.	ꓘ	Catcher	Batters	Score	Opponent	Venue	Umpire	Box
June 15, 2022	Luis García	2	3	5	1	Martín Maldonado	Nathaniel Lowe, Ezequiel Durán, Brad Miller	9–2	Texas Rangers	Globe Life Field	Ryan Blakney	
June 15, 2022	Phil Maton	7	6	1	2	Martín Maldonado	Nathaniel Lowe, Ezequiel Durán, Brad Miller	9–2	Texas Rangers	Globe Life Field	Ryan Blakney	
García: Game score: 63 • Win (4–5)

==== No-hitters ====
Date	Pitchers	IP	BB	BR	K	Pit.	BF	Catcher	Score	Opponent	Venue	Umpire	Box
June 25, 2022	Cristian Javier	7	1	2	13	115	23	Martín Maldonado	3–0	New York Yankees	Yankee Stadium	Alex Tosi	
June 25, 2022	Héctor Neris	1	2	2	0	20	5	Martín Maldonado	3–0	New York Yankees	Yankee Stadium	Alex Tosi	
June 25, 2022	Ryan Pressly	1	0	0	2	15	3	Martín Maldonado	3–0	New York Yankees	Yankee Stadium	Alex Tosi	
June 25, 2022	Javier: Game score: 83 • Win (5–3) • Neris: Hold (16) • Pressly: Save (15)												
November 2, 2022; World Series; Game 4	Cristian Javier	6	2	2	9	97	20	Christian Vázquez	5–0	Philadelphia Phillies	Citizens Bank Park	Tripp Gibson	
November 2, 2022; World Series; Game 4	Bryan Abreu	1	0	0	3	15	3	Christian Vázquez	5–0	Philadelphia Phillies	Citizens Bank Park	Tripp Gibson	
November 2, 2022; World Series; Game 4	Rafael Montero	1	0	0	1	10	3	Christian Vázquez	5–0	Philadelphia Phillies	Citizens Bank Park	Tripp Gibson	
November 2, 2022; World Series; Game 4	Ryan Pressly	1	1	1	1	19	4	Christian Vázquez	5–0	Philadelphia Phillies	Citizens Bank Park	Tripp Gibson	
November 2, 2022; World Series; Game 4	Javier: Game score: 79 • Win (2–0)												

=== Awards ===
2022 Houston Astros award winners
Name of award			Recipient	Ref
All-MLB Team	First Team	Second baseman	Jose Altuve	
All-MLB Team	First Team	Designated hitter	Yordan Alvarez	
All-MLB Team	First Team	Starting pitcher	Framber Valdez	
All-MLB Team	First Team	Starting pitcher	Justin Verlander	
All-MLB Team	Second Team	Outfielder	Kyle Tucker	
All-MLB Team	Second Team	Relief pitcher	Ryan Pressly	
American League Championship Series Most Valuable Player (ALCS MVP)			Jeremy Peña	
American League (AL) Player of the Month		June	Yordan Alvarez	
American League (AL) Player of the Month		August	Alex Bregman	
American League (AL) Player of the Week		April 10	Alex Bregman	
American League (AL) Player of the Week		June 6	Yordan Alvarez	
American League (AL) Player of the Week		September 18	Yordan Alvarez	
Babe Ruth Award			Jeremy Peña	
Comeback Player of the Year			Justin Verlander	
Cy Young Award			Justin Verlander	
Darryl Kile Award			Martín Maldonado	
Fred Hartman Award for Long and Meritorious Service to Baseball			Marian Hartman (Note: Hartman oversees community programs supported by the Astros Foundation, including the Astros MLB Youth Academy. In 2007, she was recognized with the Jimmy Wynn Toy Cannon Award for exceptional community service with the Texas Baseball Hall of Fame. A member of the Astros Hall of Fame selection committee, Hartman also works with Astros alumni.)	
Gold Glove Award		Shortstop	Jeremy Peña	
Gold Glove Award		Right fielder	Kyle Tucker	
Houston Astros		Most Valuable Player (MVP)	Yordan Alvarez	
Houston Astros		Pitcher of the Year	Justin Verlander	
Houston Astros		Rookie of the Year	Jeremy Peña	
Luis Aparicio Award			Jose Altuve (Note: Co-winner with Luis Arráez of the Minnesota Twins.)	
MLB All-Star Game		Reserve second baseman	Jose Altuve	
MLB All-Star Game		Reserve outfielder	Yordan Alvarez	
MLB All-Star Game		Reserve outfielder	Kyle Tucker	
MLB All-Star Game		Reserve pitcher	Framber Valdez	
MLB All-Star Game		Reserve pitcher	Justin Verlander	
MLB All-Star Game		Manager	Dusty Baker	
Players Choice Awards		AL Comeback Player	Justin Verlander	
Players Choice Awards		AL Outstanding Pitcher	Justin Verlander	
Silver Slugger Award		Second baseman	Jose Altuve	
Silver Slugger Award		Designated hitter	Yordan Alvarez	
The Sporting News		AL All-Star at designated hitter	Yordan Alvarez	
The Sporting News		AL Comeback Player of the Year	Justin Verlander	
The Sporting News		AL Starting Pitcher of the Year	Justin Verlander	
Topps All-Star Rookie Team		Shortstop	Jeremy Peña	
World Series Most Valuable Player (WS MVP)			Jeremy Peña	

Other awards results

Name of award	Voting recipient(s) (Team)	Ref.
AL Cy Young	1st—Verlander (HOU) • 5th—Valdez (HOU)	
AL Hank Aaron	Winner—Judge (NYY) • Finalists—Altuve (HOU) • Alvarez (HOU)	
AL Manager of the Year	1st—Francona (CLE) • 4th—Baker (HOU)	
AL Most Valuable Player	1st—Judge (NYY) • 3rd—Alvarez (HOU) • 5th—Altuve (HOU); Other Astros: 10th—Verlander • 15th—Tucker • 19th—Bregman • 20th—Valdez	
Heart & Hustle	Winner—Goldschmidt (STL) • Nominee—Altuve (HOU)	
Roberto Clemente	Winner—J. Turner (LAD) • Nominee—Altuve (HOU)	

=== League leaders ===
==== Batters ====
2022 AL batting leaders
Category	Player	Figure	Rank
Wins Above Replacement (WAR)— position players	Yordan Alvarez	6.8	3rd
WAR—offense	Jose Altuve	6.8	2nd
WAR—offense	Yordan Alvarez	6.3	4th
WAR—defense	Jeremy Peña	2.4	2nd
Batting average (AVG)	Yordan Alvarez	.306	4th
Batting average (AVG)	Jose Altuve	.300	8th
On-base percentage (OBP)	Yordan Alvarez	.406	2nd
On-base percentage (OBP)	Jose Altuve	.387	4th
Slugging percentage (SLG)	Yordan Alvarez	.613	3rd
Slugging percentage (SLG)	Jose Altuve	.533	4th
On-base plus slugging (OPS)	Yordan Alvarez	1.019	2nd
On-base plus slugging (OPS)	Jose Altuve	.921	4th
Runs scored	Jose Altuve	103	2nd
Runs scored	Yordan Alvarez	95	4th
Runs scored	Alex Bregman	93	5th
Total bases	Yordan Alvarez	288	8th
Total bases	Jose Altuve	281	10th
Doubles (2B)	Yuli Gurriel	40	6th
Doubles (2B)	Jose Altuve	39	8th
Doubles (2B)	Alex Bregman	38	10th
Home runs (HR)	Yordan Alvarez	37	3rd
Runs batted in (RBI)	Kyle Tucker	107	3rd
Runs batted in (RBI)	Yordan Alvarez	97	5th
Runs batted in (RBI)	Alex Bregman	93	8th
Extra-base hits	Yordan Alvarez	68	6th
Extra-base hits	Jose Altuve	67	8th
Bases on balls	Alex Bregman	87	2nd
Bases on balls	Yordan Alvarez	78	4th
Stolen bases (SB)	Kyle Tucker	25	5th
Adjusted OPS+	Yordan Alvarez	187	2nd
Adjusted OPS+	Jose Altuve	160	3rd
Runs created (RC)	Yordan Alvarez	119	2nd
Runs created (RC)	Jose Altuve	113	4th
Adjusted batting runs	Yordan Alvarez	57	2nd
Adjusted batting runs	Jose Altuve	44	4th
Adjusted batting wins	Yordan Alvarez	5.7	2nd
Adjusted batting wins	Jose Altuve	4.4	4th
Times on base	Alex Bregman	240	4th
Times on base	Jose Altuve	234	9th
Offensive winning percentage	Yordan Alvarez	.805	2nd
Offensive winning percentage	Jose Altuve	.756	3rd
Hits by pitch	Alex Bregman	11	10th
Sacrifice hits	Martín Maldonado	4	8th
Sacrifice flies	Alex Bregman	10	1st
Sacrifice flies	Yordan Alvarez	7	6th
Intentional bases on balls	Yordan Alvarez	9	5th
Intentional bases on balls	Kyle Tucker	4	10th
Double plays grounded into	Alex Bregman	18	8th
Stolen base percentage (SB%)	Jose Altuve	94.74	2nd
Stolen base percentage (SB%)	José Siri ^{†}	87.50	4th
Stolen base percentage (SB%)	Kyle Tucker	86.21	7th
Power–speed number	Kyle Tucker	27.3	1st
Power–speed number	Jose Altuve	21.9	9th
At bats per strikeout	Yuli Gurriel	7.9	5th
At bats per strikeout	Alex Bregman	7.1	9th
^{†}Includes statistics attained with Houston prior to in-season trade to Tampa Bay.
Primary source:

==== Pitchers ====
2022 AL pitching leaders
Category	Player	Figure	Rank
Wins Above Replacement (WAR)— pitchers	Justin Verlander	5.9	3rd
Wins Above Replacement (WAR)— pitchers	Cristian Javier	3.7	10th
Earned run average (ERA)	Justin Verlander	1.75	1st
Earned run average (ERA)	Framber Valdez	2.82	6th
Wins	Justin Verlander	18	1st
Wins	Framber Valdez	17	2nd
Wins	Luis García	15	4th
Wins	José Urquidy	13	9th
Win–loss percentage	Justin Verlander	.818	1st
Win–loss percentage	Framber Valdez	.739	4th
Win–loss percentage	Luis García	.652	8th
WHIP	Justin Verlander	0.829	1st
WHIP	Framber Valdez	1.157	10th
Hits per nine innings (H/9)	Justin Verlander	5.966	1st
Hits per nine innings (H/9)	Framber Valdez	7.421	7th
BB/9	Justin Verlander	1.491	3rd
BB/9	José Urquidy	2.081	9th
K/9	Justin Verlander	9.514	7th
Games played	Rafael Montero	71	3rd
Games played	Héctor Neris	70	5th
Innings pitched	Framber Valdez	201 1/3	1st
Strikeouts (SO)	Cristian Javier	194	7th
Strikeouts (SO)	Framber Valdez	194	7th
Quality starts	Framber Valdez	26	1st
Quality starts	Justin Verlander	21	5th
Complete games	Framber Valdez	3	1st
Shutouts	Framber Valdez	1	1st
Saves	Ryan Pressly	33	4th
Holds	Héctor Neris	25	3rd
Holds	Rafael Montero	23	7th
Home runs allowed	José Urquidy	29	4th
Bases on balls allowed	Framber Valdez	67	4th
Strikeout-to-walk ratio (K/BB)	Justin Verlander	6.379	3rd
Home runs per nine innings (HR/9)	Framber Valdez	0.492	1st
Home runs per nine innings (HR/9)	Justin Verlander	0.617	3rd
Wild pitches	Framber Valdez	11	3rd
Wild pitches	Luis García	8	10th
Hit by pitch	Framber Valdez	11	3rd
Games finished	Ryan Pressly	43	7th
Adjusted ERA+	Justin Verlander	220	1st
Adjusted ERA+	Framber Valdez	137	6th
Fielding Independent Pitching (FIP)	Justin Verlander	2.49	3rd
Fielding Independent Pitching (FIP)	Framber Valdez	3.06	6th
Adjusted pitching runs	Justin Verlander	39	1st
Adjusted pitching runs	Cristian Javier	23	6th
Adjusted pitching runs	Framber Valdez	23	7th
Adjusted pitching wins	Justin Verlander	4.4	1st
Adjusted pitching wins	Cristian Javier	2.5	6th
Adjusted pitching wins	Framber Valdez	2.4	7th
Base out runs saved (RE24)	Justin Verlander	39.74	1st
Base out runs saved (RE24)	Cristian Javier	25.50	8th
Base out runs saved (RE24)	Framber Valdez	23.66	10th
Win probability added (WPA)	Justin Verlander	4.2	2nd
Situational wins saved (WPA/LI)	Justin Verlander	4.8	1st
Situational wins saved (WPA/LI)	Framber Valdez	2.8	9th
Situational wins saved (WPA/LI)	Cristian Javier	2.4	10th
Championship WPA	Justin Verlander	1.8	7th
Primary source: • QS & Hld (AL leaders):

=== Milestones ===
==== Career achievements ====
Date	Individual	Role	Quantity	Statistic	Note	Ref.
April 8, 2022	Jeremy Peña	Shortstop	1st	home run		
April 16, 2022	Justin Verlander	Starting pitcher	3,000	innings pitched	138th	
May 3, 2022	Dusty Baker	Manager	2,000	wins as manager	12th	
May 30, 2022	Framber Valdez	Starting pitcher	1st	9-inning complete game		
June 19, 2022	J. J. Matijevic	Designated hitter	1st	hit and home run		
July 3, 2022	Jose Altuve	Second baseman	1.500	games played		
July 10, 2022	Korey Lee	Catcher	1st	hit, double, and run batted in (RBI)		
August 5, 2022	Trey Mancini	Left fielder	1st	grand slam		
August 18, 2022	Alex Bregman	Third baseman	200th	double		
August 20, 2022	Yuli Gurriel	First baseman	200th	double		
September 2, 2022	Yainer Díaz	Designated hitter	1st	RBI		
September 5, 2022	Hunter Brown	Starting pitcher	1st	strikeout and win		
September 12, 2022	Framber Valdez	Starting pitcher	1st	shutout		
September 15, 2022	Seth Martinez	Relief pitcher	1st	win		

==== Major League debuts ====
Player—Appeared at position

- Jeremy Peña, shortstop
- Ronel Blanco, relief pitcher
- Joe Perez, third baseman
- Parker Mushinski, relief pitcher
- J. J. Matijevic, pinch hitter
- Korey Lee, catcher
- David Hensley, shortstop
- Yainer Díaz, designated hitter
- Hunter Brown, starting pitcher

Date and opponent

- April 7 at Los Angeles (AL) (Note: Opening Day)
- April 8 at Los Angeles (AL)
- April 8 at Los Angeles (AL)
- April 17 at Seattle
- April 22 vs Toronto
- July 1 vs Los Angeles (AL)
- August 27 vs Baltimore
- September 2 at Los Angeles (AL)
- September 5 vs Texas
Also:
Box

== Minor league system ==
=== Teams ===
Major League Baseball announced a reversion of changes to names of leagues throughout the minor leagues. Included with significant amendments that were introduced in advance of the 2021 season, the minor leagues were realigned and renamed according to classification. The Pacific Coast League became the AAA West, International League the AAA East, Texas League the Double-A Central, and so forth. However, that convention lasted just one season. On March 16, 2022, MLB announced that all leagues would be referred to by their previous names starting in 2022 and beyond. The realignment would remain in place.

On March 1, 2022, Joe Thon was promoted to manager of the Fayetteville Woodpeckers in the Single-A Carolina League for 2022, his second overall season with the club, after having served as a development coach in 2021. Thon's staff included pitching coach John Kovalik, hitting coach Jose Puentes, development coach Vincent Blue, athletic trainer Erik Braun and strength coach Matt Jones.

On August 19, the Space Cowboys scored 17 runs in the sixth inning of the second game a doubleheader versus the Oklahoma City Dodgers to set a franchise record. The previous record for runs in an inning was eight. The inning lasted 58 minutes and the Space Cowboys sent 23 batters to the plate, collecting ten hits and nine walks. Yainer Díaz hit a three-run home run and Alex De Goti drove in five runners during the inning. The Space Cowboys won, 21–4

Level	Team	League	Manager
AAA	Sugar Land Space Cowboys	Pacific Coast League	Mickey Storey
AA	Corpus Christi Hooks	Texas League	Gregorio Petit
High-A	Asheville Tourists	South Atlantic League	Nate Shaver
Low-A	Fayetteville Woodpeckers	Carolina League	Dickie Joe Thon
Rookie	FCL Astros	Florida Complex League	
Rookie	DSL Astros	Dominican Summer League	

=== Awards ===
- Pacific Coast League Pitcher of the Year: Hunter Brown, RHP
- Triple-A All-Star Team—Pitcher: Hunter Brown

== See also ==
- List of Major League Baseball 100 win seasons
- List of Major League Baseball All-Star Game managers
- List of Major League Baseball annual ERA leaders
- List of Major League Baseball annual wins leaders
- List of Major League Baseball franchise postseason streaks
- List of Major League Baseball managerial wins and winning percentage leaders
- List of Major League Baseball no-hitters
- List of Major League Baseball pitchers who have thrown an immaculate inning
- List of Major League Baseball players with a home run in their final major league at bat
- List of Major League Baseball postseason sweeps
- List of Major League Baseball titles leaders
- List of walk-off home runs in the postseason and All-Star Game
