= 2021 Houston Astros season =

60th season in Major League Baseball for the Houston Astros

2021 Houston Astros
- American League champions American League West champions
- League: American League
- Division: West
- Ballpark: Minute Maid Park
- City: Houston, Texas
- Record: 95–67 (.586)
- Divisional place: 1st
- Owners: Jim Crane
- General managers: James Click
- Managers: Dusty Baker
- Television: AT&T SportsNet Southwest (Todd Kalas, Geoff Blum)
- Radio: KTRH 740 Weekday Night Games Sportstalk 790; Houston Astros Radio Network (Robert Ford, Steve Sparks, Geoff Blum); KLAT (Spanish) (Francisco Romero, Alex Treviño)
- Stats: ESPN.com; Baseball Reference

The 2021 Houston Astros season was the 60th season for the Major League Baseball (MLB) franchise located in Houston, Texas, their 57th as the Astros, ninth in both the American League (AL) and AL West division, and 22nd at Minute Maid Park. They entered the season as a wild card qualifier through a second-place finish in the AL West for a fourth consecutive postseason appearance. Having ultimately progressed to the American League Championship Series (ALCS)—also their fifth consecutive—the Astros defeated the Boston Red Sox in six games to advance to the 2021 World Series, where they would be defeated by the Atlanta Braves in six games.

Four Astros players gained selection to the 2021 All-Star Game: second baseman Jose Altuve, shortstop Carlos Correa, outfielder Michael Brantley, and pitcher Ryan Pressly. First baseman Yuli Gurriel won the AL batting title, his first, with a .319 batting average, becoming the second Cuban-born player and second Astro after Altuve to do so. Correa led AL position players with 7.2 Wins Above Replacement (WAR).

The Astros concluded the regular season with a 95–67 record, while clinching an AL West title for the fourth time in the last five seasons. It was also the 11th division title in franchise history, sixth playoff berth over the previous seven years, and 15th playoff appearance overall. By winning the AL West, Dusty Baker became the first manager in major league history to guide five different clubs to a division title, giving him eight division titles overall.

In the playoffs, the Astros defeated the Chicago White Sox in the American League Division Series (ALDS) in four games to advance to their fifth straight ALCS. They faced the Boston Red Sox in a rematch of the 2018 ALCS. The Astros won the ALCS in six games for the fourth pennant in franchise history and third as an AL team. They advanced to the World Series for the third time in five years, but lost to the Atlanta Braves in six games.

Following the season, designated hitter Yordan Alvarez (second selection) and right fielder Kyle Tucker (first) were both selected for 2021's All-MLB Second Team. Gurriel and Correa each won their first Gold Glove Awards, while the Astros were named the AL Gold Glove Team. Correa also won the Platinum Glove and Fielding Bible Awards both for the first time.

An American League (and franchise) record five Astros were named Gold Glove finalists, along with another five as finalists for the Silver Slugger Award. Baker and pitcher Luis García were named finalists for the AL Manager of the Year and AL Rookie of the Year awards, respectively. Baker finished third in voting, and García finished second. This marked the third consecutive season that an Astros player was named a finalist for the AL Rookie of the Year Award, following Yordan Alvarez, who won it unanimously in 2019, and Cristian Javier, who finished in third in 2020.

== Offseason ==
=== Summary ===
The Astros entered the 2021 Major League Baseball (MLB) season as having been defeated by the Tampa Bay Rays in seven games in the American League Championship Series (ALCS) and runner-up for the 2020 AL pennant. The Astros played to a 3–0 deficit to begin the ALCS, won the next three, and were defeated 4–2 in Game 7. The Rays thus avoided joining the 2004 New York Yankees as the only MLB clubs to lose a League Championship Series after mounting a 3–0 lead.

Ace starting pitcher Justin Verlander missed the entire 2021 season recuperating from ulnar collateral ligament reconstruction surgery, also known as Tommy John surgery, which was performed on October 1, 2020. He was in the final year of his contract. On February 27, 2021, the Astros placed the right-hander on the 60-day injured list as he continued to recover from the surgery.

=== Offseason transactions ===
==== Free agent signings ====
- Signed right-handed pitcher (RHP) Ryne Stanek to a 1-year contract on January 7, 2021
- Signed RHP Pedro Báez to a 2-year contract on January 13, 2021
- Signed catcher (C) Jason Castro to a 2-year contract on January 22, 2021
- Signed RHP Jake Odorizzi to a 2-year contract on March 8, 2021

==== Free agent departures ====
- Outfielder (OF) George Springer signed a six-year contract with the Toronto Blue Jays on January 23, 2021.
- OF Josh Reddick signed a minor league contract with the Arizona Diamondbacks on April 12, 2021.

Pitchers that elected for free agency included Joe Biagini, Chase De Jong, Roberto Osuna, Brad Peacock, Chris Devenski, and Dustin Garneau

==== Trades and waiver claims ====
Players that were traded or claimed in the offseason by a different team included Brandon Bailey, Humberto Castellanos, Cionel Pérez, Carlos Sanabria, Cy Sneed, and Jack Mayfield.

==== Contract extensions ====
- Signed RHP Lance McCullers Jr. to a five-year contract extension on March 24, 2021

== Regular season ==
=== Summary ===
==== April ====
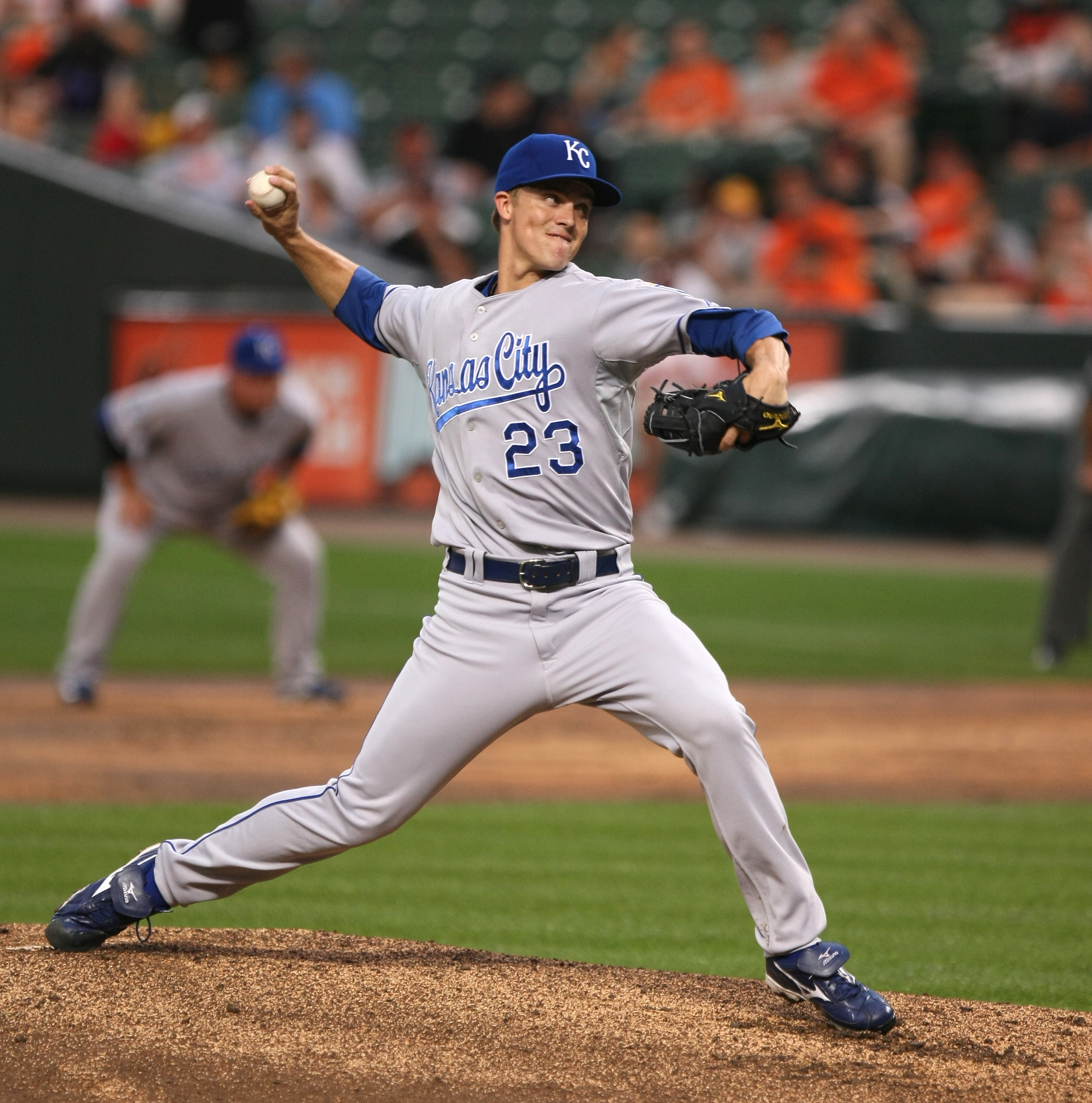
Opening Day starter Zack Greinke pitching for the Kansas City Royals in 2009

Opening Day starting lineup
Uniform	Player	Position	Starts
27	Jose Altuve	Second baseman	10
23	Michael Brantley	Left fielder	3
2	Alex Bregman	Third baseman	6
30	Kyle Tucker	Right fielder	1
1	Carlos Correa	Shortstop	5
44	Yordan Alvarez	Designated hitter	1
10	Yuli Gurriel	First baseman	4
3	Myles Straw	Center fielder	1
15	Martín Maldonado	Catcher	2
21	Zack Greinke	Pitcher	1
Venue: Oakland Coliseum • Final: Houston 8, Oakland 1 Sources:

On April 1, starting pitcher Zack Greinke earned his first career Opening Day win, and 209th win overall, as the Astros defeated the Oakland Athletics, 8–1, at the Oakland Coliseum. He pitched six scoreless innings, the 65th time his career he has produced at least six scoreless innings. Yordan Alvarez, returning from dual knee surgery that cost him nearly all of the 2020 season, drove in three runners, and Michael Brantley and Alex Bregman hit back-to-back home runs in the eighth inning. Outfielder Chas McCormick made his MLB debut as a defensive replacement for Brantley, whose home run signaled his third successive on Opening Day. Having won on a ninth consecutive Opening Day, Houston established a club record, and equaled the modern-era (Note: since 1900.) major league record for the longest streak, with the Seattle Mariners (2007–15), Cincinnati Reds (1983–91), New York Mets (1975–83) and St. Louis Browns (1937–45).

Ryan Pressly first became Houston's full-time closer in 2021.

Brantley batted .345 in April and .410 in June, remaining at or near the top of the AL batting leaders for much of the season.

Manager Dusty Baker earned his 1,900th career win in the major leagues on April 22 by an 8–2 score versus the Los Angeles Angels. In that game, Cristian Javier became the first Astros pitcher to record the first eight outs of a game by strikeout since Jim Deshaies on September 23, 1986, versus the Los Angeles Dodgers. Over five innings, Javier set a new personal high with nine strikeouts and one walk and no earned runs.

In their first rematch since the 2020 American League Championship Series (ALCS), the Astros defeated the Tampa Bay Rays, 9–2, on April 30. Lance McCullers Jr. hurled seven shutout innings, striking out nine. Brantley and Carlos Correa both had four hits and Bregman hit a two-run home run. Four RBI came via Aledmys Díaz' two hits. Brantley, Bregman, Alvarez and Correa produced consecutive hits in the third inning, leading to three of the runs. With this win, Baker reached 1,906 to pass Casey Stengel for 12th all-time.

==== May ====
Outfielder Kyle Tucker recorded a breakout season in 2021: from May 1 through the end of the season, he batted .320 and led the AL in on-base percentage, slugging and OPS.

During the May 7 game versus the Toronto Blue Jays, designated hitter Yordan Alvarez drove in the 100th run of his career, doing so in 114 game as part of a 10–4 victory. He was the seventh-fastest player to reach 100 RBI in league history and the fastest to do so since the expansion era started in 1961. The next game, he homered and drove in three more in an 8–4 loss to the Blue Jays for 103 RBI in 115 games.

In the May 25 contest versus the Los Angeles Dodgers, Greinke became the 135th pitcher in major league history to reach 3,000 career innings. Jose Altuve was hitless in four at bats to end a 17-game hitting streak, the longest in the major leagues to that point in the season.

==== June ====
On June 4, Zack Greinke threw his first complete game since April 19, 2017, and first as a member of the Astros. He allowed six hits with one run and one walk and three strikeouts in a 13–1 win over the Toronto Blue Jays at Sahlen Field in Buffalo, New York. Martín Maldonado hit a grand slam, and Carlos Correa homered twice to lead the Astros' 16-hit attack.

In the June 6 contest versus the Blue Jays, infielder Aledmys Díaz suffered a fracture in his left hand on a hit by pitch delivered from Ross Stripling. Díaz was expected to miss six to eight weeks.

Down to the Astros' final strike in the ninth inning on June 15, Carlos Correa belted a solo home run to take the contest against the Texas Rangers into extra innings. The Rangers took another lead in the tenth inning, 3–2. In the bottom of tenth, Jose Altuve belted a walk-off grand slam for a 6–2 Astros' win.

The following day, June 16, Altuve connected for a lead-off home run against Texas; Altuve became the first player in major league history to record a walk-off grand slam and then a lead-off home run in the following game. The Astros won that game, 8–4, to sweep their in-state rivals and realize their 12th win in their past 16th games. Third baseman Alex Bregman injured his left quadriceps in the first inning of the June 16 game as he attempted to avoid hitting into a double play. Catcher Garrett Stubbs was recalled from Triple-A Sugar Land to take his place on the 25-man roster.

Altuve hit his 150th career home run on June 23, served up by Thomas Eshelman of the Baltimore Orioles.

==== All-Star Game selections ====
The following Astros players were selected as reserves to play at the 91st All-Star Game, hosted by the Colorado Rockies at Coors Field on July 13, 2021:

- Jose Altuve, second baseman: seventh selection, tied Craig Biggio for most appearances by an Astro
- Michael Brantley, outfielder: had batted .402 with nine doubles, one triple and 16 RBI in a one-month span since returning from injury
- Carlos Correa: shortstop: ranked fifth in AL in OPS (.926) at time of selection
- Ryan Pressly, relief pitcher: second selection. Pressly had not allowed an earned run in 12 consecutive appearances, leading to a 1.54 ERA over 35 innings and a 4–1 record. He was tied for first in save percentage (93.3%), and among relief pitchers in the AL, was third in ERA, fourth in WHIP (0.83) and hed tied for fifth in with 14 saves.

With the four total selections, the Astros tied for second-most selections for 2021.

==== July ====
A lingering knee injury dampened Brantley's second-half performance. As of late July, he maintained a batting average of .336.

In an attempt to revamp their bullpen by adding higher-velocity pitchers, the Astros acquired Yimi García from the Miami Marlins on July 28. Up until that trade, García saved 15 games with a 3.47 ERA over 39 total relief appearances in 2021. He struck out 35 in 36 1/3 innings. The Astros sent outfielder Bryan De La Cruz and pitcher Austin Pruitt in return.

On July 30, the Astros traded Myles Straw to the Cleveland Indians for reliever Phil Maton and minor league catcher Yainer Díaz. Trading Straw allowed for the Astros to give rookie outfielders Chas McCormick and Jake Meyers more opportunities to play. On July 31, the club selected Meyers' contract from Sugar Land and promoted him to the major league roster.

==== August ====
Jake Meyers made his Major League debut on August 1 as a pinch hitter in the ninth inning of a 5–3 loss to the San Francisco Giants.

Jake Meyers hit his first career home run on August 14 versus pitcher Jaime Barría of the Los Angeles Angels, and added a grand slam later in the same game as the Astros won, 8–2.

Third baseman Alex Bregman returned from left quadriceps strain on August 25 after missing over two months. He scoring the winning run versus the Kansas City Royals on the day of his return, capping a 6–5, 10-inning score.

==== September and October ====
José Siri made his major league debut on September 3 as a pinch runner in the ninth inning versus the San Diego Padres. Jake Meyers promptly hit a single that scored Siri from second base to give Siri his first run as a major leaguer.

Siri made his first start in the majors on September 13, playing left field and facing the Texas Rangers. He went 4-for-5 with two home runs and five runs batted in to power a 15–1 rout at Globe Life Field. He is the first player since the RBI statistic became official in 1920 to have that many RBI along with multiple home runs in their first major league start. Yordan Alvarez added two home runs, including his 30th of the season; at the age of 24, he is the second Astro to hit 30 home runs in a season at that age after Alex Bregman, who hit 31 in 2018.

In the September 17 contest versus the Arizona Diamondbacks, Jose Altuve homered off Madison Bumgarner at Minute Maid Park to collect his 849th career hit in the stadium. The hit tied him with Lance Berkman for most by an Astro in the venue. He then passed Berkman the next night with a double.

On September 21, Carlos Correa scored his 100th run on the season to become the first Astros shortstop to score 100 runs in a season.

During the final road trip of the season, twenty-seven members of the team paid homage to veteran pitcher Zack Greinke, known for his leisurely dress style. They wore fishing shirts, short shorts, and bucket hats. Lance McCullers Jr. also brought in a bag of groceries from Whole Foods – as is Greinke's habit to fill his locker – as replenishment for their upcoming flight. Greinke, who is from Florida, wore a bright orange Tampa Bay Buccaneers hat, an oversized fishing shirt, and shorts. Martín Maldonado donned his own bright orange hat. With Greinke posing with his new cadre of imitators, the team posted photos of their amusement on Instagram. The team had chosen to honor the pitcher, in the final year of his contract, after a 7–6 win over the Arizona Diamondbacks in which had allowed five runs over four innings, raising his ERA on the season to 4.11.

On September 23, Alvarez drove in two runs on a home run in the first inning against Los Angeles Angels to score his 100th RBI of the season. He was the second-youngest Astro to reach 100 RBI in one season, trailing César Cedeño, who did so at the age of 23 in 1974. It was a 9–5 win. Ryan Pressly completed a scoreless ninth in his 60th appearance of the season in this game, concluding the final condition for his contract for 2022 to fully vest. He would earn a guaranteed $10 million. Since being acquired by Houston at the 2018 trade deadline, Pressly had produced a 2.19 ERA, 0.924 WHIP, and saved 42 games in 160 1/3 innings. He had converted 25 of 27 save chances on the season.

On September 28, the Astros won 4–3 against the Tampa Bay Rays on consecutive walks with the bases loaded, which was the first time they had done so in team history and only the eighth time in Major League Baseball history since 1931. The Astros clinched the AL West on September 30 with a win over Tampa Bay at Minute Maid Park for their fourth division title in five seasons. It was Houston's tenth division title and 15th postseason entrance. For the first time in franchise history, the Astros gained a postseason berth for the fifth consecutive season. With a combined record of 432–272 (.614) since 2017, Houston had attained the most wins in the major leagues in that span. Manager Dusty Baker secured his eighth division title while becoming the first manager to guide five different clubs to a division title. (Note: The previous four clubs were the San Francisco Giants, Chicago Cubs, Cincinnati Reds and Washington Nationals.) It was Baker's 11th career postseason appearance.

In the final game of the 2021 regular season, Yuli Gurriel hit a walk-off single to score Jason Castro and defeat the Oakland Athletics. With that hit, his batting average stood at .319 to lead teammate Michael Brantley and Vladimir Guerrero Jr. of the Toronto Blue Jays (both hit .311) for the AL batting championship. At age 37, Gurriel was the sixth-oldest player to win a batting title, the oldest to win their first batting title since Barry Bonds in 2002, and the first Cuban-born player since Tony Oliva in 1971. (Note: Baker was also manager of the San Francisco Giants in 2002, for whom Bonds played when won his first batting title, and when the Giants clinched the National League pennant.) Brantley, continuing to produce through lingering knee pain, saw 39 at bats in September. It was the sixth time in his career he had finished in the top 10 in the AL in batting.

Over the final month of the season, right fielder Kyle Tucker batted .346 with eight home runs, 20 runs scored, 19 RBI, .438 on-base percentage, and .692 slugging percentage for a 1.130 OPS. He was awarded AL Player of the Month for September, his first career monthly award.

=== Season standings ===
==== American League West ====
AL West
Team	W	L	Pct.	GB	Home	Road
Houston Astros	95	67	.586	—	51‍–‍30	44‍–‍37
Seattle Mariners	90	72	.556	5	46‍–‍35	44‍–‍37
Oakland Athletics	86	76	.531	9	43‍–‍38	43‍–‍38
Los Angeles Angels	77	85	.475	18	40‍–‍42	37‍–‍43
Texas Rangers	60	102	.370	35	36‍–‍45	24‍–‍57

==== American League Wild Card ====
AL Wild Card standings

Division leaders
Team	W	L	Pct.
Tampa Bay Rays	100	62	.617
Houston Astros	95	67	.586
Chicago White Sox	93	69	.574

Wild Card teams (Top 2 teams qualify for postseason)
Team	W	L	Pct.	GB
Boston Red Sox	92	70	.568	—
New York Yankees	92	70	.568	—
Toronto Blue Jays	91	71	.562	1
Seattle Mariners	90	72	.556	2
Oakland Athletics	86	76	.531	6
Cleveland Indians	80	82	.494	12
Los Angeles Angels	77	85	.475	15
Detroit Tigers	77	85	.475	15
Kansas City Royals	74	88	.457	18
Minnesota Twins	73	89	.451	19
Texas Rangers	60	102	.370	32
Baltimore Orioles	52	110	.321	40

==== Astros team leaders ====
Team statistics
{

==== Record versus opponents ====
American League

2021 American League record Source: MLB Standings Grid – 2021
Team	BAL	BOS	CWS	CLE	DET	HOU	KC	LAA	MIN	NYY	OAK	SEA	TB	TEX	TOR	NL
Baltimore	—	6–13	0–7	2–5	2–5	3–3	4–3	2–4	2–4	8–11	3–3	3–4	1–18	4–3	5–14	7–13
Boston	13–6	—	3–4	4–2	3–3	2–5	5–2	3–3	5–2	10–9	3–3	4–3	8–11	3–4	10–9	16–4
Chicago	7–0	4–3	—	10–9	12–7	2–5	9–10	2–5	13–6	1–5	4–3	3–3	3–3	5–1	4–3	14–6
Cleveland	5–2	2–4	9–10	—	12–7	1–6	14–5	5–1	8–11	3–4	2–4	3–4	1–6	4–2	2–5	9–11
Detroit	5–2	3–3	7–12	7–12	—	5–2	8–11	1–6	8–11	3–3	1–6	5–1	4–3	6–1	3–3	11–9
Houston	3–3	5–2	5–2	6–1	2–5	—	3–4	13–6	3–4	2–4	11–8	11–8	4–2	14–5	4–2	9–11
Kansas City	3–4	2–5	10–9	5–14	11–8	4–3	—	2–4	10–9	2–4	2–5	4–3	2–4	2–4	3–4	12–8
Los Angeles	4–2	3–3	5–2	1–5	6–1	6–13	4–2	—	5–2	4–3	4–15	8–11	1–6	11–8	4–3	11–9
Minnesota	4–2	2–5	6–13	11–8	11–8	4–3	9–10	2–5	—	1–6	1–5	2–4	3–3	4–3	3–4	10–10
New York	11–8	9–10	5–1	4–3	3–3	4–2	4–2	3–4	6–1	—	4–3	5–2	8–11	6–1	8–11	12–8
Oakland	3–3	3–3	3–4	4–2	6–1	8–11	5–2	15–4	5–1	3–4	—	4–15	4–3	10–9	2–5	11–9
Seattle	4–3	3–4	3–3	4–3	1–5	8–11	3–4	11–8	4–2	2–5	15–4	—	6–1	13–6	4–2	9–11
Tampa Bay	18–1	11–8	3–3	6–1	3–4	2–4	4–2	6–1	3–3	11–8	3–4	1–6	—	3–4	11–8	15–5
Texas	3–4	4–3	1–5	2–4	1–6	5–14	4–2	8–11	3–4	1–6	9–10	6–13	4–3	—	2–4	7–13
Toronto	14–5	9–10	3–4	5–2	3–3	2–4	4–3	3–4	4–3	11–8	5–2	2–4	8–11	4–2	—	14–6

Updated with the results of all games through October 3, 2021.

=== Game log ===
Legend
	Astros win
	Astros loss
	Postponement
**Bold**	Astros team member

2021 Game Log: 95–67 (Home: 51–30; Away: 44–37)
April: 14–12 (Home: 7–7; Away: 7–5)

#	Date	Opponent	Score	Win	Loss	Save	Attendance	Record	Box/Streak
1	April 1	@ Athletics	8–1	**Greinke** (1–0)	Bassitt (0–1)	—	10,436	1–0	W1
2	April 2	@ Athletics	9–5	**Abreu** (1–0)	Luzardo (0–1)	—	5,446	2–0	W2
3	April 3	@ Athletics	9–1	**McCullers Jr.** (1–0)	Irvin (0–1)	**Raley** (1)	5,803	3–0	W3
4	April 4	@ Athletics	9–2	**Bielak** (1–0)	Manaea (0–1)	—	4,504	4–0	W4
5	April 5	@ Angels	6–7	Watson (1–0)	**Smith** (0–1)	Mayers (1)	13,447	4–1	L1
6	April 6	@ Angels	4–2	**Pressly** (1–0)	Iglesias (1–1)	—	11,122	5–1	W1
7	April 8	Athletics	6–2	**Javier** (1–0)	Irvin (0–2)	—	21,765	6–1	W2
8	April 9	Athletics	2–6	Petit (2–0)	**Abreu** (1–1)	—	21,768	6–2	L1
9	April 10	Athletics	3–7	Montas (1–1)	**Urquidy** (0–1)	—	21,760	6–3	L2
10	April 12	Tigers	2–6	Mize (1–0)	**Greinke** (1–1)	—	15,779	6–4	L3
11	April 13	Tigers	2–8	Boyd (2–1)	**Odorizzi** (0–1)	—	17,080	6–5	L4
12	April 14	Tigers	4–6	Fulmer (1–0)	**McCullers Jr.** (1–1)	Garcia (2)	14,720	6–6	L5
13	April 16	@ Mariners	5–6	Misiewicz (2–0)	**Stanek** (0–1)	—	8,967	6–7	L6
14	April 17	@ Mariners	1–0	**Greinke** (2–1)	Flexen (1–1)	**Pressly** (1)	8,960	7–7	W1
15	April 18	@ Mariners	2–7	Newsome (1–0)	**Odorizzi** (0–2)	—	8,959	7–8	L1
16	April 20	@ Rockies	2–6	Gray (2–1)	**L. García** (0–1)	—	10,144	7–9	L2
17	April 21	@ Rockies	3–6	Gomber (1–2)	**Urquidy** (0–2)	—	7,120	7–10	L3
18	April 22	Angels	8–2	**Javier** (2–0)	Cobb (1–1)	—	13,985	8–10	W1
19	April 23	Angels	5–4 (10)	**Pressly** (2–0)	Iglesias (1–2)	—	21,728	9–10	W2
20	April 24	Angels	16–2	**Emanuel** (1–0)	Canning (1–2)	—	21,820	10–10	W3
21	April 25	Angels	2–4	Rodriguez (1–0)	**L. García** (0–2)	Iglesias (3)	21,781	10–11	L1
22	April 26	Mariners	5–2	**Urquidy** (1–2)	Sheffield (1–2)	**Pressly** (2)	11,862	11–11	W1
23	April 27	Mariners	2–0	**Javier** (3–0)	Gonzales (1–3)	**Pressly** (3)	14,413	12–11	W2
24	April 28	Mariners	7–5	**Smith** (1–1)	Montero (2–1)	**Stanek** (1)	12,707	13–11	W3
25	April 29	Mariners	0–1	Kikuchi (1–1)	**L. García** (0–3)	Graveman (3)	14,149	13–12	L1
26	April 30	@ Rays	9–2	**McCullers Jr.** (2–1)	Yarbrough (1–3)	—	6,169	14–12	W1

May: 15–12 (Home: 11–5; Away: 4–7)

#	Date	Opponent	Score	Win	Loss	Save	Attendance	Record	Box/Streak
27	May 1	@ Rays	3–1	**Urquidy** (2–2)	Fleming (1–3)	**Pressly** (4)	7,335	15–12	W2
28	May 2	@ Rays	4–5	Springs (2–0)	**Raley** (0–1)	Castillo (7)	6,933	15–13	L1
29	May 4	@ Yankees	3–7	Luetge (2–0)	**Bielak** (1–1)	—	10,850	15–14	L2
30	May 5	@ Yankees	3–6	Loáisiga (3–1)	**Raley** (0–2)	Chapman (7)	9,895	15–15	L3
31	May 6	@ Yankees	7–4	**Scrubb** (1–0)	Green (0–3)	**Pressly** (5)	10,042	16–15	W1
32	May 7	Blue Jays	10–4	**Urquidy** (3–2)	Stripling (0–2)	—	25,410	17–15	W2
33	May 8	Blue Jays	4–8	Matz (5–2)	**Javier** (3–1)	—	25,794	17–16	L1
34	May 9	Blue Jays	7–4	**Abreu** (2–1)	Pearson (0–1)	**Pressly** (6)	24,355	18–16	W1
35	May 10	Angels	4–5	Suárez (1–0)	**Bielak** (1–2)	Iglesias (6)	13,695	18–17	L1
36	May 11	Angels	5–1	**McCullers Jr.** (3–1)	Slegers (2–1)	—	17,350	19–17	W1
37	May 12	Angels	9–1	**Bielak** (2–2)	Heaney (1–3)	—	13,668	20–17	W2
38	May 13	Rangers	4–3 (11)	**Raley** (1–2)	Martin (0–1)	—	16,340	21–17	W3
39	May 14	Rangers	10–4	**Greinke** (3–1)	Benjamin (0–2)	—	24,495	22–17	W4
40	May 15	Rangers	6–5	**L. García** (1–3)	Dunning (2–3)	**Pressly** (7)	25,858	23–17	W5
41	May 16	Rangers	6–2	**Raley** (2–2)	Rodríguez (1–2)	—	26,069	24–17	W6
42	May 18	@ Athletics	5–6	Petit (5–0)	**Abreu** (2–2)	—	4,838	24–18	L1
43	May 19	@ Athletics	8–1	**Greinke** (4–1)	Montas (5–3)	—	3,925	25–18	W1
44	May 20	@ Athletics	8–4	**L. García** (2–3)	Irvin (3–5)	—	4,562	26–18	W2
45	May 21	@ Rangers	5–7 (10)	Hearn (2–1)	**Abreu** (2–3)	—	30,445	26–19	L1
46	May 22	@ Rangers	4–8	Allard (1–0)	**Scrubb** (1–1)	—	38,055	26–20	L2
47	May 23	@ Rangers	2–3 (10)	King (5–3)	**Pressly** (2–1)	—	36,444	26–21	L3
48	May 25	Dodgers	2–9	Kershaw (7–3)	**Greinke** (4–2)	—	34,443	26–22	L4
49	May 26	Dodgers	5–2	**L. García** (3–3)	Bauer (5–3)	**Abreu** (1)	30,939	27–22	W1
50	May 28	Padres	3–10 (11)	Melancon (1–0)	**Raley** (2–3)	—	32,045	27–23	L1
51	May 29	Padres	8–11 (12)	Adams (2–0)	**Garza** (0–1)	Díaz (1)	31,323	27–24	L2
52	May 30	Padres	7–4	**Greinke** (5–2)	Snell (1–2)	—	29,019	28–24	W1
53	May 31	Red Sox	11–2	**Urquidy** (4–2)	Rodríguez (5–4)	—	28,543	29–24	W2

June: 19–9 (Home: 8–4; Away: 11–5)

#	Date	Opponent	Score	Win	Loss	Save	Attendance	Record	Box/Streak
54	June 1	Red Sox	5–1	**L. García** (4–3)	Richards (4–4)	—	23,449	30–24	W3
55	June 2	Red Sox	2–1	**Valdez** (1–0)	Pivetta (6–1)	**Pressly** (8)	22,664	31–24	W4
56	June 3	Red Sox	1–5	Pérez (4–2)	**Odorizzi** (0–3)	—	24,853	31–25	L1
57	June 4	@ Blue Jays	13–1	**Greinke** (6–2)	Ryu (5–3)	—	5,510	32–25	W1
58	June 5	@ Blue Jays	2–6	Stripling (2–3)	**Urquidy** (4–3)	—	5,327	32–26	L1
59	June 6	@ Blue Jays	6–3	**L. García** (5–3)	Matz (6–3)	**Pressly** (9)	5,404	33–26	W1
60	June 8	@ Red Sox	7–1	**Valdez** (2–0)	Pérez (4–3)	—	23,604	34–26	W2
61	June 9	@ Red Sox	8–3	**Odorizzi** (1–3)	Eovaldi (7–3)	**Javier** (1)	21,007	35–26	W3
62	June 10	@ Red Sox	8–12	Hernández (1–2)	**Taylor** (0–1)	—	23,378	35–27	L1
63	June 11	@ Twins	6–4	**Stanek** (1–1)	Shoemaker (2–8)	**Pressly** (10)	17,223	36–27	W1
64	June 12	@ Twins	2–5	Berríos (7–2)	**L. García** (5–4)	Rogers (6)	18,767	36–28	L1
65	June 13	@ Twins	14–3	**Valdez** (3–0)	Pineda (3–4)	—	19,147	37–28	W1
66	June 15	Rangers	6–3 (10)	**Pressly** (3–1)	Evans (0–2)	—	26,379	38–28	W2
67	June 16	Rangers	8–4	**Greinke** (7–2)	Lyles (2–5)	—	22,735	39–28	W3
68	June 17	White Sox	10–2	**Urquidy** (5–3)	Cease (5–3)	—	21,795	40–28	W4
69	June 18	White Sox	2–1	**Pressly** (4–1)	Crochet (2–3)	—	30,898	41–28	W5
70	June 19	White Sox	7–3	**Valdez** (4–0)	Lynn (7–3)	—	35,210	42–28	W6
71	June 20	White Sox	8–2	**McCullers Jr.** (4–1)	Keuchel (6–2)	—	39,821	43–28	W7
72	June 21	@ Orioles	10–2	**Odorizzi** (2–3)	Akin (0–3)	—	7,414	44–28	W8
73	June 22	@ Orioles	3–1	**Greinke** (8–2)	López (2–9)	**Pressly** (11)	8,510	45–28	W9
74	June 23	@ Orioles	13–0	**Urquidy** (6–3)	Eshelman (0–1)	—	10,013	46–28	W10
75	June 24	@ Tigers	12–3	**L. García** (6–4)	Ureña (2–8)	—	12,656	47–28	W11
—	June 25	@ Tigers	PPD, RAIN; rescheduled for Jun 26						
76	June 26 (1)	@ Tigers	1–3 (7)	Mize (5–4)	**Valdez** (4–1)	Cisnero (3)	12,422	47–29	L1
77	June 26 (2)	@ Tigers	3–2 (7)	**McCullers Jr.** (5–1)	Fulmer (4–4)	**Pressly** (12)	13,950	48–29	W1
78	June 27	@ Tigers	1–2 (10)	Soto (4–1)	**Taylor** (0–2)	—	13,532	48–30	L1
79	June 28	Orioles	7–9	Fry (2–2)	**Bielak** (2–3)	Plutko (1)	24,419	48–31	L2
80	June 29	Orioles	3–13	Wells (1–0)	**Garza** (0–2)	Tate (1)	30,346	48–32	L3
81	June 30	Orioles	2–5	Scott (3–3)	**L. García** (6–5)	Sulser (3)	28,124	48–33	L4

July: 16–8 (Home: 8–4; Away: 8–4)

#	Date	Opponent	Score	Win	Loss	Save	Attendance	Record	Box/Streak
82	July 1	@ Indians	7–2	**Valdez** (5–1)	Mejía (1–3)	—	13,772	49–33	W1
83	July 2	@ Indians	6–3	**McCullers Jr.** (6–1)	Hentges (1–3)	**Pressly** (13)	24,337	50–33	W2
84	July 3	@ Indians	3–2	**Odorizzi** (3–3)	Morgan (1–3)	**Pressly** (14)	24,961	51–33	W3
85	July 4	@ Indians	4–3 (10)	**Taylor** (1–2)	Clase (3–3)	**Raley** (2)	17,412	52–33	W4
86	July 6	Athletics	9–6	**Abreu** (3–3)	Wendelken (1–1)	**Pressly** (15)	26,353	53–33	W5
87	July 7	Athletics	4–3	**Taylor** (2–2)	Manaea (6–6)	**Pressly** (16)	21,150	54–33	W6
88	July 8	Athletics	1–2	Montas (8–7)	**McCullers Jr.** (6–2)	Diekman (7)	29,243	54–34	L1
89	July 9	Yankees	0–4	Luetge (3–1)	**Odorizzi** (3–4)	—	40,857	54–35	L2
90	July 10	Yankees	0–1	Cole (9–4)	**Greinke** (8–3)	—	41,259	54–36	L3
91	July 11	Yankees	8–7	**Garza Jr.** (1–2)	Green (3–5)	—	37,928	55–36	W1
–	July 13	91st All-Star Game	AL 5–2 NL	Ohtani (1–0)	Burnes (0–1)	Hendriks (1)	49,184	55–36	N/A
92	July 16	@ White Sox	7–1	**McCullers Jr.** (7–2)	Cease (7–5)	—	34,516	56–36	W2
93	July 17	@ White Sox	1–10	Giolito (8–6)	**Odorizzi** (3–5)	—	34,304	56–37	L1
94	July 18	@ White Sox	0–4	Rodón (8–3)	**Valdez** (5–2)	—	34,148	56–38	L2
95	July 19	Indians	4–3	**Greinke** (9–3)	Mejía (1–5)	**Pressly** (17)	21,963	57–38	W1
96	July 20	Indians	9–3	**L. García** (7–5)	McKenzie (1–4)	—	26,586	58–38	W2
97	July 21	Indians	4–5	Shaw (3–3)	**Pruitt** (0–1)	Karinchak (11)	21,712	58–39	L1
98	July 23	Rangers	7–3	**Bielak** (3–3)	Allard (2–8)	—	38,853	59–39	W1
99	July 24	Rangers	4–1	**Valdez** (6–2)	Gibson (6–3)	—	37,050	60–39	W2
100	July 25	Rangers	3–1	**Greinke** (10–3)	Santana (0–1)	**Pressly** (18)	35,627	61–39	W3
101	July 26	@ Mariners	8–11	Graveman (4–0)	**Stanek** (1–2)	Sewald (4)	15,162	61–40	L1
102	July 27	@ Mariners	8–6	**McCullers Jr.** (8–2)	Flexen (9–5)	—	18,930	62–40	W1
103	July 28	@ Mariners	11–4	**Odorizzi** (4–5)	Kikuchi (6–6)	—	18,908	63–40	W2
104	July 30	@ Giants	9–6	**Valdez** (7–2)	Gausman (9–5)	—	28,020	64–40	W3
105	July 31	@ Giants	6–8	Jackson (2–0)	**Taylor** (2–3)	McGee (22)	27,324	64–41	L1

August: 14–13 (Home: 7–5; Away: 7–8)

#	Date	Opponent	Score	Win	Loss	Save	Attendance	Record	Box/Streak
106	August 1	@ Giants	3–5	Webb (5–3)	**L. García** (7–6)	McGee (23)	29,655	64–42	L2
107	August 3	@ Dodgers	3–0	**McCullers Jr.** (9–2)	Buehler (11–2)	**Stanek** (2)	52,692	65–42	W1
108	August 4	@ Dodgers	5–7	Scherzer (9–4)	**Odorizzi** (4–6)	—	52,724	65–43	L1
109	August 5	Twins	3–5	Jax (2–1)	**Valdez** (7–3)	Colomé (4)	26,208	65–44	L2
110	August 6	Twins	4–5 (11)	Minaya (2–0)	**Montero** (5–4)	—	29,631	65–45	L3
111	August 7	Twins	4–0	**L. García** (8–6)	Pineda (4–7)	—	29,647	66–45	W1
112	August 8	Twins	5–7	Maeda (5–4)	**McCullers Jr.** (9–3)	Colomé (5)	26,825	66–46	L1
113	August 10	Rockies	5–0	**Odorizzi** (5–6)	Gray (7–8)	—	28,931	67–46	W1
114	August 11	Rockies	5–1	**Valdez** (8–3)	Senzatela (2–9)	—	22,200	68–46	W2
115	August 13	@ Angels	4–1	**Greinke** (11–3)	Sandoval (3–6)	**Pressly** (19)	23,981	69–46	W3
116	August 14	@ Angels	8–2	**L. García** (9–6)	Barría (2–1)	—	27,121	70–46	W4
117	August 15	@ Angels	1–3	Detmers (1–2)	**McCullers Jr.** (9–4)	Iglesias (26)	19,281	70–47	L1
118	August 16	@ Royals	6–7	Barlow (5–3)	**Y. García** (3–8)	—	10,228	70–48	L2
119	August 17	@ Royals	1–3	Lynch (3–3)	**Valdez** (8–4)	Brentz (2)	9,748	70–49	L3
120	August 18	@ Royals	2–3	Tapia (1–0)	**Taylor** (2–4)	Barlow (7)	12,278	70–50	L4
121	August 19	@ Royals	6–3 (10)	**Pressly** (5–1)	Davis (0–3)	**Javier** (2)	9,884	71–50	W1
122	August 20	Mariners	12–3	**McCullers Jr.** (10–5)	Kikuchi (7–7)	—	26,899	72–50	W2
123	August 21	Mariners	15–1	**Odorizzi** (6–6)	Gilbert (5–5)	—	29,908	73–50	W3
124	August 22	Mariners	3–6 (11)	Sewald (8–3)	**Stanek** (1–3)	Ramírez (1)	27,526	73–51	L1
125	August 23	Royals	1–7	Lynch (4–3)	**Greinke** (11–4)	—	18,742	73–52	L2
126	August 24	Royals	4–0	**L. García** (10–6)	Singer (3–9)	—	22,964	74–52	W1
127	August 25	Royals	6–5 (10)	**Graveman** (5–0)	Payamps (0–3)	—	21,052	75–52	W2
128	August 27	@ Rangers	5–4	**Maton** (3–0)	Martin (3–4)	**Pressly** (20)	29,286	76–52	W3
129	August 28	@ Rangers	5–2	**Valdez** (9–4)	Allard (3–11)	**Pressly** (21)	37,810	77–52	W4
130	August 29	@ Rangers	2–13	Hearn (4–4)	**Greinke** (11–5)	—	31,062	77–53	L1
131	August 30	@ Mariners	4–3	**Maton** (4–0)	Smith (2–3)	**Pressly** (22)	11,630	78–53	W1
132	August 31	@ Mariners	0–4	Sewald (9–3)	**Graveman** (5–1)	—	10,452	78–54	L1

September: 15–12 (Home: 8–4; Away: 7–8)

#	Date	Opponent	Score	Win	Loss	Save	Attendance	Record	Box/Streak
133	September 1	@ Mariners	0–1	Sheffield (6–8)	**Odorizzi** (6–7)	Sewald (8)	10,519	78–55	L2
134	September 3	@ Padres	6–3	**Taylor** (3–4)	Pagán (4–1)	**Pressly** (23)	37,033	79–55	W1
135	September 4	@ Padres	2–10	Musgrove (10–8)	**Valdez** (9–5)	—	35,338	79–56	L1
136	September 5	@ Padres	3–4	Melancon (4–2)	**Stanek** (1–4)	—	35,007	79–57	L2
137	September 6	Mariners	11–2	**McCullers Jr.** (11–4)	Kikuchi (7–8)	**Bielak** (1)	25,802	80–57	W1
138	September 7	Mariners	5–4 (10)	**Stanek** (2–4)	Ramírez (1–3)	—	20,353	81–57	W2
139	September 8	Mariners	5–8	Castillo (3–5)	**Pressly** (5–2)	—	19,089	81–58	L1
140	September 10	Angels	10–5	**Valdez** (10–5)	Ohtani (9–2)	—	28,740	82–58	W1
141	September 11	Angels	2–4	Suárez (7–7)	**L. García** (10–7)	Iglesias (31)	31,547	82–59	L1
142	September 12	Angels	3–1	**McCullers Jr.** (12–4)	Quijada (0–1)	**Pressly** (24)	28,763	83–59	W1
143	September 13	@ Rangers	15–1	**Javier** (4–1)	Howard (0–4)	—	18,903	84–59	W2
144	September 14	@ Rangers	1–8	Lyles (9–11)	**Greinke** (11–6)	—	19,451	84–60	L1
145	September 15	@ Rangers	7–2	**Urquidy** (7–3)	Arihara (2–4)	—	20,991	85–60	W1
146	September 16	@ Rangers	12–1	**García** (11–7)	Otto (0–2)	—	19,121	86–60	W2
147	September 17	Diamondbacks	4–3 (10)	**Stanek** (3–4)	Clippard (1–1)	—	22,595	87–60	W3
148	September 18	Diamondbacks	4–6 (10)	Wendelken (3–2)	**Y. García** (3–9)	Clippard (6)	25,314	87–61	L1
149	September 19	Diamondbacks	7–6	**Solomon** (1–0)	Sittinger (0–1)	**Pressly** (25)	23,888	88–61	W1
150	September 20	@ Angels	10–0	**Valdez** (11–5)	Barría (2–4)	—	16,070	89–61	W2
151	September 21	@ Angels	10–5	**Urquidy** (8–3)	Naughton (0–3)	—	18,332	90–61	W3
152	September 22	@ Angels	9–5 (12)	**Y. García** (4–9)	Selman (0–1)	—	14,863	91–61	W4
153	September 23	@ Angels	2–3	Warren (2–0)	**McCullers Jr.** (12–5)	Iglesias (33)	19,829	91–62	L1
154	September 24	@ Athletics	2–14	Montas (13–9)	**Bielak** (3–4)	—	21,105	91–63	L2
155	September 25	@ Athletics	1–2	Chafin (2–3)	**Pressly** (5–3)	—	13,037	91–64	L3
156	September 26	@ Athletics	3–4	Trivino (7–7)	**Stanek** (3–5)	—	12,288	91–65	L4
157	September 28	Rays	4–3	**Maton** (5–0)	Fleming (10–7)	—	32,297	92–65	W1
158	September 29	Rays	0–7	Rasmussen (4–1)	**García** (11–8)	—	28,321	92–66	L1
159	September 30	Rays	3–2	**McCullers Jr.** (13–5)	Yarbrough (9–7)	**Pressly** (26)	31,608	93–66	W1

October: 2–1 (Home: 2–1; Away: 0–0)

#	Date	Opponent	Score	Win	Loss	Save	Attendance	Record	Box/Streak
160	October 1	Athletics	6–8	Manaea (11–10)	**Valdez** (11–6)	Trivino (22)	26,672	93–67	L1
161	October 2	Athletics	10–4	**Maton** (6–0)	Blackburn (1–4)	—	29,208	94–67	W1
162	October 3	Athletics	7–6	**Taylor** (4–4)	Trivino (7–8)	—	29,752	95–67	W2

== Postseason ==
=== Game log ===
2021 Postseason Game Log: 9–7 (Home: 5–3; Away: 4–4)
ALDS vs White Sox: 3–1 (Home: 2–0; Away: 1–1)

#	Date	Opponent	Score	Win	Loss	Save	Attendance	Record	Box/Streak
1	October 7	White Sox	6–1	McCullers Jr. (1–0)	Lynn (0–1)	—	40,497	1–0	W1
2	October 8	White Sox	9–4	Stanek (1–0)	Bummer (0–1)	—	41,315	2–0	W2
3	October 10	@ White Sox	6–12	Kopech (1–0)	Y. García (0–1)	—	40,288	2–1	L1
—	October 11	@ White Sox	Postponed (rain, makeup October 12)						
4	October 12	@ White Sox	10–1	Y. García (1–1)	Rodón (0–1)	—	40,170	3–1	W1

ALCS vs Red Sox: 4–2 (Home: 2–1; Away: 2–1)

#	Date	Opponent	Score	Win	Loss	Save	Attendance	Record	Box/Streak
1	October 15	Red Sox	5–4	Stanek (1–0)	Robles (0–1)	Pressly (1)	40,534	1–0	W1
2	October 16	Red Sox	5–9	Eovaldi (1–0)	L. García (0–1)	—	41,476	1–1	L1
3	October 18	@ Red Sox	3–12	Rodríguez (1–0)	Urquidy (0–1)	—	37,603	1–2	L2
4	October 19	@ Red Sox	9–2	Graveman (1–0)	Eovaldi (1–1)	—	38,010	2–2	W1
5	October 20	@ Red Sox	9–1	Valdez (1–0)	Sale (0–1)	—	37,599	3–2	W2
6	October 22	Red Sox	5–0	L. García (1–1)	Eovaldi (1–2)	—	42,718	4–2	W3

WS vs Braves: 2–4 (Home: 1–2; Away: 1–2)

#	Date	Opponent	Score	Win	Loss	Save	Attendance	Record	Box/Streak
1	October 26	Braves	2–6	Minter (1–0)	Valdez (0–1)	—	42,825	0–1	L1
2	October 27	Braves	7–2	Urquidy (1–0)	Fried (0–1)	—	42,833	1–1	W1
3	October 29	@ Braves	0–2	Anderson (1–0)	L. García (0–1)	Smith (1)	42,898	1–2	L1
4	October 30	@ Braves	2–3	Matzek (1–0)	Javier (0–1)	Smith (2)	43,125	1–3	L2
5	October 31	@ Braves	9–5	Urquidy (2–0)	Minter (1–1)	—	43,122	2–3	W1
6	November 2	Braves	0–7	Fried (1–1)	L. García (0–2)	—	42,868	2–4	L1

ALDS

=== American League Division Series (ALDS) vs. Chicago White Sox ===
The Astros played the Chicago White Sox in the ALDS. The managers of the two clubs—Dusty Baker of the Astros and Tony La Russa of the White Sox—had faced each other over 200 times previously as managers of other major league clubs. This series capped a historic rivalry in two intertwining professional baseball careers of which both spanned more than 50 years.

Game 1 at Minute Maid Park

The Astros started Lance McCullers Jr., while the White Sox started Lance Lynn. The Astros got the scoring started with a line drive single off the bat of rookie center fielder Jake Meyers. The Astros tacked on two more runs in the third on a Alex Bregman fielders choice and a Yordan Alvarez double that made it 3–0 Astros. Michael Brantley added on to the lead with a two run single to make it 5–0. Alvarez added a solo homer to cap the scoring for Houston as McCullers would pitch 6 2/3 innings of scoreless ball. The White Sox would get on the board in the 8th inning on a José Abreu single that made it 6–1 before Astros closer Ryan Pressly shut the door in the 9th inning to seal the Game 1 victory for the Astros.

Game 2 at Minute Maid Park

The Astros started Framber Valdez, while the White Sox started Lucas Giolito. The White Sox got the scoring started with a fielder's choice RBI from Eloy Jiménez. The Astros took the lead in the bottom of the 2nd with an RBI single from Kyle Tucker and a Chas McCormick sacrifice fly made it 2–1 Astros. The White Sox would storm back in the 5th, on RBI singles from Luis Robert & José Abreu and a sac fly from Yasmani Grandal. The Astros would tie it in the bottom half of the 5th from a 2 run single from AL batting champion Yuli Gurriel. The Astros would blow it open in the 7th off relievers Aaron Bummer and Craig Kimbrel, with Yordan Alvarez driving in Jose Altuve, Carlos Correa driving in both Alex Bregman and Yordan Alvarez before Tucker hit a 2 run home run to left to cap off the scoring. Astros relievers Ryan Pressly and Kendall Graveman each worked scoreless innings to seal the Game 2 win and give the Astros a 2–0 lead heading to Guaranteed Rate Field for Game 3.

Game 3 at Guaranteed Rate Field

The Astros started Luis García, while the White Sox started Dylan Cease. The White Sox once again got on the board first with an Eloy Jiménez RBI single. The Astros would strike back in the 2nd on a Kyle Tucker RBI double and a Jake Meyers RBI single. Tucker hit his 2nd homer of the series to make it 5–1 in the 3rd. The White Sox would answer with 5 runs in the bottom of the third. Yasmani Grandal hit a 2 run homer and Leury García hit a go ahead three run home run. The Astros would tie in the top of the 4th on an Alex Bregman RBI single. The White Sox would put up 3 in the bottom of the 4th on RBI singles from José Abreu, Eloy Jiménez along with a fielder's choice RBI off the bat of Grandal to make it 9–6 Chicago. Andrew Vaughn would come off the bench and double in Yoan Moncada, García would double in Vaughn and Anderson would single in Garcia to make it 12–6. That would be the end of scoring and White Sox closer Liam Hendriks would shut the door to send the series to a Game 4.

Game 4 at Guaranteed Rate Field

The Astros started Game 1 starter Lance McCullers Jr., while the White Sox started Carlos Rodón. The game was postponed on October 11 and was moved to October 12th. The White Sox again got the scoring started with a solo homer from rookie Gavin Sheets. Center fielder Jake Meyers sustained an injury to his left shoulder while attempting to catch Sheets' home run ball on the fly. He exited the game and was replaced by Chas McCormick. The Astros took the lead in the 3rd on an RBI double from Carlos Correa. The Astros scored three more runs in the fourth on an RBI single from Martín Maldonado and an RBI double from Alex Bregman. Another run scored for Houston as Michael Brantley drove in McCormick, and they tacked on another run on an RBI single from Brantley that scored Jose Altuve. Altuve broke the game open with a three-run homer off White Sox closer Liam Hendriks. Astros closer Ryan Pressly would allow a single to Eloy Jiménez but shut the door afterwards to send Houston to their fifth straight ALCS.

ALCS

=== American League Championship Series vs. Boston Red Sox ===
This was Houston's fifth straight ALCS appearance. The Astros faced the Boston Red Sox in a rematch of the 2018 ALCS, which the Astros lost in five games. With home field advantage in the series, the Astros started game 1 at home, where Altuve and Correa played their 65th career postseason game together. It was the most for a second baseman/shortstop duo in MLB history (this was also in addition to Altuve-Bregman-Correa-Gurriel being the most experienced playoff quartet with 61 games). The Astros won the ALCS in game six, advancing to their third World Series appearance in five years.

ALCS Schedule
Date	Day	Start time (CST)	Location	Score	Television
October 15	Friday	7:09pm	Minute Maid Park	Red Sox 4, Astros 5	Fox
October 16	Saturday	3:20pm	Minute Maid Park	Red Sox 9, Astros 5	Fox/Fox Sports 1
October 18	Monday	7:08pm	Fenway Park	Astros 3, Red Sox 12	Fox Sports 1
October 19	Tuesday	7:08pm	Fenway Park	Astros 9, Red Sox 2	Fox Sports 1
October 20	Wednesday	4:08pm	Fenway Park	Astros 9, Red Sox 1	Fox Sports 1
October 22	Friday	7:08pm	Minute Maid Park	Red Sox 0, Astros 5	Fox Sports 1

Game 1 at Minute Maid Park

The Astros started Framber Valdez, while the Red Sox started Chris Sale. The Astros got on the board first with a sacrifice fly from Yordan Alvarez. The Red Sox would respond with a game tying home run from Kiké Hernández, a fielders choice RBI from J. D. Martinez and a RBI double from Hunter Renfroe before knocking Valdez out of the game after 2 2/3. Sale would last only 2 2/3 as well before being pulled. The Astros would tie it on Altuve's 20th career postseason home run, tying him with Hall of Famer and Yankees former captain Derek Jeter. The Astros would retake the lead on a solo homer from Carlos Correa before adding another run on a sac fly in the 8th. Hernández hit another homer off Astros closer Ryan Pressly before Pressly shut the door to seal the 5–4 Game 1 win for Houston.

Game 2 at Minute Maid Park

The Astros started Luis García, while the Red Sox started Nathan Eovaldi. The Red Sox got things started with a grand slam from DH J.D. Martinez. The Red Sox would add another slam in the 2nd to make it 8–0 as Luis García left the game with a right knee injury. Kiké Hernández would add another run on a home run off Jake Odorizzi. The Astros would add three runs in the 4th off starter Nathan Eovaldi with an RBI double from Kyle Tucker and an RBI single from Yuli Gurriel. The Astros would tack on two more runs with homers from Gurriel and Jason Castro before the Red Sox sealed the win, 9–5.

Game 3 at Fenway Park

On the mound, the Astros started right-hander José Urquidy, while the Red Sox started left-hander Eduardo Rodríguez. The Astros' starting infield consisted of Yuli Gurriel, Jose Altuve, Alex Bregman, and Carlos Correa, who established an MLB postseason record with four teammates starting their 64th postseason game together. (Note: Per the Elias Sports Bureau. The first game in which the foursome started together occurred on September 3, 2016, in a 12–4 loss to the Texas Rangers. The 2016 season was Gurriel's first in MLB, who made his debut the latest of the four.) The Red Sox scored first with RBIs from Christian Vázquez and Christian Arroyo before Kyle Schwarber hit Boston's third grand slam to break it open at 6–0, knocking Urquidy out of the game. Vázquez would add another run on an RBI single before Arroyo hit a 2-run homer to make it 9–0 after 3 innings. The Astros got on the board on a 3-run homer from Kyle Tucker. The Red Sox would add three more runs on a 2-run homer from J.D. Martinez and a solo homer from Rafael Devers before Hirokazu Sawamura shut the door to seal the 12–3 win for the Red Sox.

Game 4 at Fenway Park

The Astros started Zack Greinke, while the Red Sox countered with Nick Pivetta. The Astros got on the board first with a solo homer from Alex Bregman in the top of the 1st. The Red Sox responded immediately with a 2-run homer from Xander Bogaerts in the bottom of the 1st. No other scoring occurred until the top of the eighth inning, when Jose Altuve tied the game with a leadoff homer. The Astros batted a total of 12 times in the ninth inning, with Correa leading the frame off with a double. On the hill for Boston to attempt to hold the contest at a 2–2 tie was Eovaldi, typically their number-one starting pitcher. Eovaldi struck out Kyle Tucker, then intentionally walked Yuli Gurriel, which brought Chas McCormick's spot to bat. Baker opted to pinch hit for McCormick with Aledmys Díaz, whom Eovaldi also struck out. Jason Castro next batted for Maldonado, and with a 1–2 count, umpire Laz Díaz called a slow curveball on that appeared to find the outside corner for a ball. After a foul ball, Castro singled on split-finger fastball to score Correa, putting the Astros back on top, 3–2. Next, Altuve worked a full-count walk to load the bases, leading Cora to remove Eovaldi for Martín Pérez. Michael Brantley greeted Pérez' first pitch–a fastball–with a double to clear the bases and increase the score to 6–2. Yordan Alvarez singled in Brantley to make it 7–2 and Correa and Tucker both followed with RBI singles to make it 9–2. The seven runs scored tied the postseason record for runs scored in a ninth inning. Astros closer Ryan Pressly allowed two singles in the 9th inning but allowed neither baserunner to score, securing the Game 4 win for the Astros and knot up the ALCS at 2 games apiece.

Game 5 at Fenway Park

The ALCS Game 5 featured a rematch of Game 1 starters: Framber Valdez for the Astros, and Chris Sale for the Red Sox. Houston scored first with an solo home run from Yordan Alvarez over the Green Monster. Valdez did not allow a Boston baserunner until the fifth inning. The Astros scored five runs in the top of the sixth, chasing Sale with one out. Alvarez doubled home two more runs to make it 3–0, then Yuli Gurriel doubled home Alvarez; rookie outfielder José Siri singled home Kyle Tucker and Gurriel to cap a five-run 6th inning. Both Alvarez and Gurriel collected three hits and three RBI; all of Alvarez' hits landed to the opposite field. This marked the first occasion in Alvarez' career in which he had produced at least three opposite-field hits; meanwhile Sale had allowed four total hits in 2021 to left-handed batters in 42 2/3 IP. Michael Brantley hit an RBI single in the seventh to up the score to 7–0. Rafael Devers got Boston on the board with a solo home run versus Valdez in the bottom of the 7th. Gurriel drove in two more in the 9th to make it 9–1. Valdez went eight innings and got the win, limiting Boston to three total hits and one walk while striking out five; he is the seventh visiting pitcher to go at least eight innings while allowing a run or fewer at Fenway Park in the postseason and the first since Charles Nagy in 1998. Ryne Stanek shut the door in the 9th seal the Game 5 win and send the series back to Houston with the Astros up 3 games to 2.

Game 6 at Minute Maid Park

The ALCS Game 6 featured a rematch of Game 2 starters Luis Garcia for the Astros and Nathan Eovaldi for the Red Sox. The Astros got on the board first with an RBI double deep to center field from Yordan Alvarez. Kiké Hernández appeared to be in position to catch Alvarez' batted ball, but the ball bounced off his arm just below the glove and dropped to the ground for the two-base hit. Garcia allowed no hits until the sixth inning, when Hernández tripled with two outs. Baker removed Garcia, who left to a standing ovation from the fans. His 5 2/3 no-hit innings equaled Brandon Backe's club record for a postseason contest; Backe also started with 5 2/3 no-hit innings in the 2004 NLDS. The Astros got another run in the sixth on a double play that scored Alvarez from 3rd to make it 2–0 Houston. In the seventh, Boston encountered their best chance to score with runners at first and third and one out following Alex Verdugo's single. Kendall Graveman struck out pinch-hitter Travis Shaw; at that instant, Maldonado threw perfectly to Carlos Correa, covering second, to catch Verdugo attempting to steal for an inning-ending double play. Kyle Tucker added insurance runs in the eighth with a three-run home run off reliever Adam Ottavino. Ryan Pressly closed the game in the ninth to defeat the Red Sox, 5–0, capturing the Astros' third pennant in the last five seasons.

The ALCS win brought Baker his first AL pennant. Thus, Baker became the ninth manager in major league history to win a pennant in both the American and National Leagues, having first won in 2002.

WS

==== Origins of the Astros' pennant-winning roster ====
Having reached the World Series for the third time in five seasons, just six players remained from the 2017 World Series winner; of the six, two did not play in the 2021 ALCS: Lance McCullers Jr and Marwin González.

- Homegrown, international signings:
  - Jose Altuve, 2007
  - Framber Valdez, 2015
  - José Urquidy, 2015
  - Cristian Javier, 2015
  - Luis García, 2017
- Homegrown, amateur draft:
  - Jason Castro, 2008–10th overall pick
  - Carlos Correa, 2012–1st overall pick
  - Alex Bregman, 2015–2nd overall pick
  - Kyle Tucker, 2015–5th overall pick
  - Jake Meyers, 2017–13th round and 391st pick
  - Chas McCormick, 2017–21st round and 631st pick

=== World Series vs. Atlanta Braves ===
This World Series appearance marked Houston's third World Series appearance in five years and fourth World Series appearance overall.

World Series Schedule
Date	Day	Start time (CST)	Location	Score	Television
October 26	Tuesday	7:09pm	Minute Maid Park	Braves 6, Astros 2	Fox
October 27	Wednesday	7:09pm	Minute Maid Park	Braves 2, Astros 7	Fox
October 29	Friday	7:09pm	Truist Park	Astros 0, Braves 2	Fox
October 30	Saturday	7:09pm	Truist Park	Astros 2, Braves 3	Fox
October 31	Sunday	7:15pm	Truist Park	Astros 9, Braves 5	Fox
November 2	Tuesday	7:09pm	Minute Maid Park	Braves 7, Astros 0	Fox

Game 1 at Minute Maid Park

Game 1 of the World Series featured a matchup of Charlie Morton, who pitched for the Astros in 2017 and 2018 before leaving in free agency, for the Braves against Framber Valdez for the Astros. The Braves got the scoring started with a leadoff home run from Jorge Soler and Austin Riley doubled in Ozzie Albies. Soler drove in his 2nd run of the game on a fielder's choice RBI. Adam Duvall would add a 2-run home run to make it 5–0 Atlanta. Morton would leave the game after 2 1/3 after taking a comebacker to his ankle in the 2nd inning, which fractured his right fibula and ruled Morton out for the rest of the series. The Astros would get a run in the 4th after an error from shortstop Dansby Swanson. The Braves would get another run in the 8th on Freddie Freeman sac fly. The Astros would tack on a run in the 8th as well on a RBI groundout from Carlos Correa. Braves closer Will Smith would walk Aledmys Díaz before shutting the door to seal the Game 1 win for Atlanta, 6–2.

Game 2 at Minute Maid Park

Game 2 featured a matchup of Max Fried for the Braves and José Urquidy for the Astros. The Astros got on the board first with an Alex Bregman sac fly that scored Jose Altuve. The Braves would respond in the top of the 2nd with a solo homer from catcher Travis d'Arnaud. The Astros would tack on four runs in the bottom of the 2nd with RBI singles from rookie outfielder José Siri, catcher Martín Maldonado and veteran outfielder Michael Brantley. Freddie Freeman would drive in his 2nd RBI of the series with an RBI single that made it 5–2 Houston. The Astros would tack on a run in the 6th on an fielder's choice error. Altuve would add another run on his 22nd career postseason home run, tying him for 2nd place on the all time postseason home run leaderboard with Bernie Williams. Kendall Graveman would shut the door in the 9th to tie the series at 1 game apiece heading to Atlanta for Game 3.

Game 3 at Truist Park

Game 3 featured a matchup of rookie right hander Luis García, while Atlanta went with right hander Ian Anderson. The Braves held the Astros hitless for the first seven innings until Aledmys Díaz hit a single to right field in the eighth inning to end the Braves' no-hit bid. The Astros managed just one more hit as the Braves won, 2–0, to take a 2–1 Series lead.

Game 4 at Truist Park

The Braves opted for a bullpen game in Game 4, starting the left-hander Dylan Lee. The Astros went with right-hander Zack Greinke. Houston scored the first run of the game in the top of the first inning when Carlos Correa drove in Jose Altuve. Altuve would add to the lead with a solo home run off of Kyle Wright in the fourth, passing Bernie Williams for second all time on the postseason home runs list. The Braves would not get on the board until the sixth, when Austin Riley drove in Eddie Rosario against reliever Phil Maton. In the seventh inning, the Braves' Dansby Swanson stepped up and hit a game-tying solo home run off reliever Cristian Javier. Jorge Soler came off the bench and proceeded to follow up Dansby Swanson's homer with one of his own, this one giving Atlanta the lead. Tyler Matzek pitched a scoreless top of the eighth, aided by a great catch by Eddie Rosario robbing Jose Altuve of extra bases. Will Smith recorded his second save of the series, and the Braves moved win away from a World Series title.

Game 5 at Truist Park

The Astros started Framber Valdez, while the Braves went with another bullpen game, starting Tucker Davidson. The Braves started off strong with a first inning grand slam by Adam Duvall. The Astros got an RBI double from Alex Bregman and a sac fly by Martin Maldonado to make it 4–2. In the top of the third, an RBI double by Carlos Correa and a sacrifice groundout by Yuli Gurriel made it a tie game at 4-4. Freddie Freeman put the Braves back up with a 460-foot home run into right field. In the fifth, with two on base, Braves reliever A.J. Minter intentionally walked Alex Bregman. Maldonado came up and drew a bases loaded walk to tie the game. He was followed by pinch-hitter Marwin González, who drove in two more with a single. In the top of the 7th, Maldonado tacked on his third RBI of the night with a double that scored Kyle Tucker. In the eighth, the Astros got one more on an RBI double by Carlos Correa, his second of the night. Kendall Graveman pitched a scoreless eighth and ninth to secure the 9–5 victory for Houston and force Game 6.

Game 6 at Minute Maid Park

The Astros started Luis García, while the Braves sent Max Fried to the mound. The Braves took a 3–0 lead in the top of the third inning on a single and walk followed by a towering two-out home run by Jorge Soler that left Minute Maid Park over the raised train tracks in left field. Garcia exited after Soler's home run, having pitched 2 2/3 innings while striking out three batters. In the top of the fifth, a two-run home run by Dansby Swanson followed by a walk then a two-out double by Freddie Freeman extended Atlanta's lead to 6–0. In the top of the seventh, Freeman hit a solo home run with two outs to make it 7–0. Tyler Matzek entered in relief in the bottom of the seventh; Fried allowed no runs on four hits while striking out six batters and walking none in six innings. Atlanta closer Will Smith was brought in to pitch the bottom of the ninth. He allowed a leadoff single to Michael Brantley and retired the next three batters, the last out being a Yuli Gurriel infield grounder fielded by Swanson, who threw to Freeman, giving the Braves the title. With this final inning, Will Smith finished off a postseason in which he closed 11 of 16 Braves games while allowing no runs. Jorge Soler won the World Series Most Valuable Player Award.

With the World Series victory, Joc Pederson became a back-to-back World Series winner on two different teams, joining names like Jack Morris, Ryan Theriot, Jake Peavy and Ben Zobrist who previously accomplished that feat. Pederson had become a fan-favorite throughout his three-month stay in Atlanta, particularly for his preference to wear pearls.

=== Postseason rosters ===
Playoff rosters
American League Division Series

- Pitchers: 21 Zack Greinke 31 Kendall Graveman 43 Lance McCullers Jr. 45 Ryne Stanek 53 Cristian Javier 55 Ryan Pressly 58 Brooks Raley 59 Framber Valdez 65 José Urquidy 77 Luis García 88 Phil Maton 93 Yimi García
- Catchers: 11 Garrett Stubbs 15 Martín Maldonado 18 Jason Castro
- Infielders: 1 Carlos Correa 2 Alex Bregman 10 Yuli Gurriel 16 Aledmys Díaz 27 Jose Altuve
- Outfielders: 6 Jake Meyers 20 Chas McCormick 23 Michael Brantley 26 José Siri 30 Kyle Tucker 44 Yordan Alvarez

American League Championship Series

- Pitchers: 17 Jake Odorizzi 21 Zack Greinke 31 Kendall Graveman 45 Ryne Stanek 53 Cristian Javier 55 Ryan Pressly 58 Brooks Raley 59 Framber Valdez 62 Blake Taylor 65 José Urquidy 77 Luis García 88 Phil Maton 93 Yimi García
- Catchers: 15 Martín Maldonado 18 Jason Castro
- Infielders: 1 Carlos Correa 2 Alex Bregman 10 Yuli Gurriel 16 Aledmys Díaz 27 Jose Altuve
- Outfielders: 6 Jake Meyers 20 Chas McCormick 23 Michael Brantley 26 José Siri 30 Kyle Tucker 44 Yordan Alvarez

World Series

- Pitchers: 17 Jake Odorizzi 21 Zack Greinke 31 Kendall Graveman 45 Ryne Stanek 53 Cristian Javier 55 Ryan Pressly 58 Brooks Raley 59 Framber Valdez 62 Blake Taylor 65 José Urquidy 77 Luis García 88 Phil Maton 93 Yimi García
- Catchers: 11 Garrett Stubbs (Games 4–6) 15 Martín Maldonado 18 Jason Castro (Games 1–3)
- Infielders: 1 Carlos Correa 2 Alex Bregman 9 Marwin González 10 Yuli Gurriel 16 Aledmys Díaz 27 Jose Altuve
- Outfielders: 20 Chas McCormick 23 Michael Brantley 26 José Siri 30 Kyle Tucker 44 Yordan Alvarez

=== Awards notes ===
For recognition of their defensive prowess, Rawlings Sporting Goods announced that the Houston Astros were the winners of the 2021 American League (AL) Gold Glove Team Award, the second iteration of the team-wide award, and Houston's first. The Astros led the American League with +78 Defensive Runs Saved (DRS), second in MLB to only the St. Louis Cardinals with +86, the winners of the National League Gold Glove Team Award. The Astros also led the AL with +45 outs above average (OAA), second in the major leagues to the Cardinals (+50). Shortstop Carlos Correa won his first career of both the Platinum Glove and Gold Glove Awards, marking the first time an Astros player has won a Platinum Glove. Correa led the AL with +21 DRS in 2021.

Five Astros players were announced on October 25, 2021, as finalists for the Silver Slugger Award, including Jose Altuve, Yordan Alvarez, Correa, Yuli Gurriel, and Kyle Tucker. However, all of the five were claimed by players on other teams, including Vladimir Guerrero Jr. of Toronto at first base, Marcus Semien of Toronto at second base, Xander Bogaerts of Boston at shortstop, Teoscar Hernández, Aaron Judge and Cedric Mullins in the outfield, and Shohei Ohtani at designated hitter.

Starting pitcher Luis García finished second to Randy Arozarena of Tampa Bay in the American League Rooke of the Year balloting, receiving two first-place votes

Manager Dusty Baker was named as a finalist for AL Manager of the Year Award. He finished third, garnering two first-place votes, five for second place, and eight for third place. Kevin Cash of Tampa Bay was the winner.

== Statistics ==
Note: Yellow background is team leader in specific category.

=== Batting ===
==== Regular season ====
Final regular season batting statistics
Pos	Player	G	PA	AB	R	H	2B	3B	HR	RBI	TB	BB	SO	SB	CS	AVG	OBP	SLG	OPS	OPS+	HBP	GIDP	SF	P/PA	SECA	RC	RC27	WAR
C	Martín Maldonado	125	426	373	40	64	10	1	12	36	112	47	127	0	0	.172	.272	.300	.571	58	5	9	1	4.20	.255	29.1	2.5	−0.1
1B	Yuli Gurriel	143	605	530	83	169	31	0	15	81	245	59	68	1	1	.319	.383	.462	.846	131	4	16	12	3.79	.255	92.7	6.4	3.7
2B	Jose Altuve	146	678	601	117	167	32	1	31	83	294	66	91	5	3	.278	.350	.489	.839	127	4	9	6	3.67	.324	103.1	6.1	4.4
SS	Carlos Correa	148	640	555	104	155	34	1	26	92	269	75	116	0	0	.279	.366	.485	.850	131	4	16	6	4.08	.341	96.7	6.2	7.2
3B	Alex Bregman	91	400	348	54	94	17	0	12	55	147	44	53	1	0	.270	.355	.422	.777	113	4	13	4	3.98	.282	51.6	5.1	2.1
LF	Michael Brantley^{†}	121	508	469	68	146	29	3	8	47	205	33	53	1	0	.311	.362	.437	.799	119	5	11	1	3.68	.198	72.2	5.8	2.5
CF	Myles Straw	98	370	325	44	85	13	1	2	34	106	38	71	17	5	.262	.339	.326	.665	85	2	7	2	4.09	.218	39.1	4.1	1.4
RF	Kyle Tucker^{†}	140	567	506	83	149	37	3	30	92	282	53	90	14	2	.294	.359	.557	.917	147	1	10	5	3.84	.391	99.9	7.2	5.7
DH	Yordan Alvarez^{†}	144	598	537	92	149	35	1	33	104	285	50	145	1	0	.277	.346	.531	.877	136	8	16	3	4.01	.348	93.9	6.2	3.2
OF	Chas McCormick	108	330	284	47	73	12	0	14	50	127	25	104	4	2	.257	.319	.447	.766	107	4	5	7	4.01	.285	40.9	4.9	2.3
3B	Aledmys Díaz	84	319	294	28	76	19	0	8	45	119	16	62	0	1	.259	.317	.405	.721	97	9	7	0	3.57	.197	36.1	4.3	1.6
C	Jason Castro^{†}	66	179	149	22	35	7	0	8	21	66	25	54	0	0	.235	.356	.443	.799	118	3	4	0	4.31	.376	23.8	5.4	1.0
CF	Jake Meyers	49	163	146	22	38	8	0	6	28	64	10	50	3	0	.260	.323	.438	.761	107	4	0	1	4.02	.267	22.1	5.4	1.2
3B	Abraham Toro^{↔}	35	122	109	17	23	1	0	6	20	42	9	21	3	1	.211	.287	.385	.672	83	3	1	1	3.82	.275	12.7	3.9	0.8
IF	Robel García^{↔}	46	117	106	8	16	3	0	1	8	22	8	42	0	0	.151	.216	.208	.423	18	1	2	1	3.87	.132	2.9	0.8	−0.8
UT	Taylor Jones	35	108	102	11	25	8	1	2	16	41	4	29	0	0	.245	.269	.402	.670	81	0	5	2	3.93	.196	9.5	3.1	0.1
OF	José Siri	21	49	46	10	14	0	1	4	9	28	1	17	3	1	.304	.347	.609	.956	155	2	0	0	4.06	.370	9.6	7.8	0.3
C	Garrett Stubbs^{†}	18	38	34	2	6	2	0	0	3	8	2	7	0	0	.176	.222	.235	.458	26	0	0	0	3.00	.116	1.6	1.4	−0.2
IF	Marwin González^{↔}	14	36	34	5	6	0	0	3	8	15	1	8	0	0	.176	.222	.441	.663	76	1	3	0	4.03	.294	2.4	2.1	−0.5
IF	Jacob Wilson	6	14	13	2	2	1	1	0	1	5	1	2	0	0	.154	.214	.385	.599	60	0	1	0	4.14	.308	0.7	1.7	0.0
2B	Alex De Goti	2	7	6	2	2	0	0	0	1	2	1	2	0	0	.333	.429	.333	.762	115	0	0	0	3.57	.167	1.0	6.7	0.1
DH	Ronnie Dawson^{†}	3	6	5	2	1	0	0	0	0	1	1	0	0	0	.200	.333	.200	.533	53	0	1	0	3.33	.200	0.1	0.5	−0.1
P	Luís García	3	6	6	0	0	0	0	0	0	0	0	1	0	0	.000	.000	.000	.000	−100	0	0	0	2.33	.000	−0.6	−2.7	−0.1
P	Lance McCullers Jr.^{†}	3	4	4	0	0	0	0	0	0	0	0	3	0	0	.000	.000	.000	.000	−100	0	0	0	4.25	.000	−0.4	−2.9	−0.1
P	José Urquidy	2	4	4	0	1	0	0	0	0	1	0	3	0	0	.250	.250	.250	.500	39	0	0	0	4.75	.000	0.2	1.8	0.0
P	Framber Valdez	2	4	4	0	0	0	0	0	0	0	0	2	0	0	.000	.000	.000	.000	−100	0	0	0	3.50	.000	−0.4	−2.8	−0.1
P	Zack Greinke	1	2	2	0	0	0	0	0	0	0	0	1	0	0	.000	.000	.000	.000	−100	0	0	0	2.00	.000	−0.2	−2.8	0.0
P	Jake Odorizzi	1	1	1	0	0	0	0	0	0	0	0	0	0	0	.000	.000	.000	.000	−100	0	0	0	1.00	.000	−0.1	−2.7	0.0

Final regular season team batting totals
Pos	Player	G	PA	AB	R	H	2B	3B	HR	RBI	TB	BB	SO	SB	CS	AVG	OBP	SLG	OPS	OPS+	HBP	GIDP	SF	P/PA	SECA	RC	RC27	WAR
Position player totals			6270	5572	863	1495	299	14	221	834	2485	569	1212	53	16	.268	.340	.446	.786	114	64	136	54					
Pitcher totals			21	21	0	1	0	0	0	0	1	0	10	0	0	.048	.048	.048	.095	–74	0	0	0					
Team totals		162	6291	5593	863	1496	299	14	221	834	2486	569	1222	53	16	.267	.339	.444	.783	113	64	136	54	3.90	.285	838.6	5.3	
Rank in 15 AL teams				1	1	1	2	12	5	1	2	4	2	14	2	1	1	3	2	1	7		1					
Pos	Player	G	PA	AB	R	H	2B	3B	HR	RBI	TB	BB	SO	SB	CS	AVG	OBP	SLG	OPS	OPS+	HBP	GIDP	SF	P/PA	SECA	RC	RC27	WAR

=== Pitching ===
Note: Pos = Position; W = Wins; L = Losses; ERA = Earned run average; G = Games pitched; GS = Games started; SV = Saves; IP = Innings pitched; H = Hits allowed; R = Runs allowed; ER = Earned runs allowed; BB = Walks allowed; SO = Strikeouts; HBP = Hit by pitch; WHIP = Walks + hits per inning pitched

Player	Pos	W	L	ERA	G	GS	SV	IP	H	R	ER	BB	SO	HBP	WHIP
Zack Greinke	SP	11	6	4.16	30	29	0	171.0	164	82	79	36	120	2	1.17
Lance McCullers Jr.	SP	13	5	3.16	28	28	0	162.1	122	59	57	76	185	10	1.22
Luis García	SP	11	8	3.48	30	28	0	155.1	133	62	60	50	167	3	1.18
Framber Valdez	SP	11	6	3.14	22	22	0	134.2	110	52	47	58	125	11	1.25
José Urquidy	SP	8	3	3.62	20	20	0	107.0	87	43	43	19	90	2	0.99
Jake Odorizzi	SP	6	7	4.21	24	23	0	104.2	97	51	49	34	91	3	1.25
Cristian Javier	RP	4	1	3.55	36	9	2	101.1	67	41	40	53	130	7	1.18
Ryne Stanek	RP	3	5	3.42	72	0	2	68.1	46	32	26	37	83	5	1.22
Ryan Pressly	CL	5	3	2.25	64	0	26	64.0	49	19	16	13	81	0	0.97
Brooks Raley	RP	2	3	4.78	58	0	2	49.0	43	30	26	16	65	3	1.20
Blake Taylor	RP	4	4	3.16	51	0	0	42.2	38	19	15	22	41	0	1.41
Brandon Bielak	—	3	4	4.50	28	2	1	50.0	48	29	25	21	46	3	1.38
Bryan Abreu	—	3	3	5.75	31	0	1	36.0	35	26	23	18	36	3	1.47
Phil Maton	—	4	0	4.97	27	0	0	25.1	29	15	14	12	24	3	1.62
Kendall Graveman	—	1	1	3.13	23	0	0	23.0	20	8	8	12	27	5	1.39
Joe Smith	—	1	1	7.48	27	0	0	21.2	35	18	18	4	17	3	1.80
Yimi García	—	1	2	5.48	23	0	0	21.1	18	15	13	5	25	0	1.08
Andre Scrubb	—	1	1	5.03	18	0	0	19.2	15	11	11	14	21	0	1.48
Kent Emanuel	—	1	0	2.55	10	0	0	17.2	12	5	5	4	13	1	0.91
Peter Solomon	—	1	0	1.29	6	0	0	14.0	10	2	2	8	10	0	1.29
Ralph Garza Jr.	—	1	2	4.09	9	0	0	11.0	11	6	5	7	14	0	1.64
Enoli Paredes	—	0	0	6.23	12	0	0	8.2	7	10	6	17	15	2	2.77
Nivaldo Rodríguez	—	0	0	2.45	4	0	0	7.1	4	2	2	4	3	3	1.09
Rafael Montero	—	0	1	0.00	4	0	0	6.0	3	1	0	2	5	0	0.83
Josh James	—	0	0	5.40	5	0	0	5.0	4	3	3	2	8	0	1.20
Tyler Ivey	—	0	0	7.71	1	1	0	4.2	6	4	4	1	3	0	1.50
Pedro Báez	—	0	0	2.08	4	0	0	4.1	2	1	1	1	5	0	0.69
Seth Martinez	—	0	0	15.00	3	0	0	3.0	5	5	5	3	3	0	2.67
Austin Pruitt	—	0	1	6.75	2	0	0	2.2	3	2	2	0	1	1	1.13
Ryan Hartman	—	0	0	3.86	1	0	0	2.1	3	1	1	0	2	0	1.29
Robel Garcia	—	0	0	36.00	1	0	0	1.0	5	4	4	0	0	0	5.00
Totals		95	67	3.78	162	162	34	1445.0	1231	658	607	549	1456	70	1.23
Rank in 15 AL Teams		2	14	4	—	—	12	2	2	3	4	11	6	11	5

== Major League Baseball draft ==
2021 Houston Astros complete draft list

Houston Astros 2021 MLB draft selections
Rd.	Slot	Draftee	Position	School	Origin	Signed	Notes	Bio
1	None						(Note: Forfeited per sanctions levied by league prior to the 2020 season for electronic sign-stealing violations.)	
2	None						(Note: Forfeited per sanctions levied by league prior to the 2020 season for electronic sign-stealing violations.)	
3	87	Tyler Whitaker	Shortstop	Bishop Gorman HS	(Nevada)	Y		
4	117	Álex Úlloa	Shortstop	Calvary Christian Ac.	(Ohio)	N		
4	132	Chayce McDermott	Right-handed pitcher	Ball State	(Indiana)	Y	(Note: Compensattory pick for the Toronto Blue Jays signing George Springer) (Note: MLB debut on July 24, 2024, with the Baltimore Orioles)	
5	148	Quincy Hamilton	Outfielder	Wright State	(Alaska)	Y		
6	178	Spencer Arrighetti	Right-handed pitcher	Louisiana • 2021	(New Mexico)	Y	(Note: MLB debut on April 10, 2024, with Houston)	
7	208	Joey Loperfido	Outfielder	Duke	(Pennsylvania)	Y	(Note: MLB debut on April 30, 2024, with Houston)	
8	238	Colton Gordon	Left-handed pitcher	Central Florida	(Florida)	Y	(Note: MLB debut on May 14, 2025, with Houston)	
9	268	Aaron Brown	Right-handed pitcher	Middle Tennessee	(Tennessee)	Y		
10	298	Michael Sandle	Outfielder	South Alabama • 2021	(Ohio)	Y		
11	328	Chad Stevens	Shortstop	Portland	(California)	Y	(Note: MLB debut on July 3, 2025, with the Los Angeles Angels)	
12	358	Rhett Kouba	Right-handed pitcher	Dallas Baptist	(Oklahoma)	Y		
13	388	Kobe Kato	Second baseman	Arizona • 2021	(Hawaii)	Y		
14	418	Bryant Salgado	Right-handed pitcher	Oregon State • 2021	(Puerto Rico)	Y		
15	448	Adrian Chaidez	Right-handed pitcher	UCLA • 2021	(California)	Y		
16	478	Nic Swanson	Right-handed pitcher	Northeastern State	(Oklahoma)	Y		
17	508	Justin Williams	Third baseman	Penn State	(Pennsylvania)	Y		
18								
19								
20								
Sources:/

== Awards and achievements ==
=== Milestones ===
==== MLB debuts ====
Player—Appeared at position

- Chas McCormick, left fielder
- Ronnie Dawson, designated hitter
- Alex De Goti, second baseman
- Tyler Ivey, starting pitcher
- Ralph Garza Jr., relief pitcher
- Jake Meyers, pinch hitter
- José Siri, pinch runner
Date and opponent

- April 1 at Oakland
- April 14 vs Detroit
- April 16 at Seattle
- May 21 at Texas
- May 29 vs San Diego
- August 1 at San Francisco
- September 3 at San Diego
Box

=== Career honors ===
Inductees into the
Venezuelan Baseball Hall of Fame
Induction	Player	Position	Uni.	Games	Start	Finish	Ref.
Class	Bobby Abreu	Right fielder	53	74	1996	1997	

=== Annual awards ===
Houston Astros 2021 award winners
Name of award			Recipient	Ref
All-MLB Team	Second Team	Outfielder	Kyle Tucker	
All-MLB Team	Second Team	Designated hitter	Yordan Alvarez	
American League Championship Series Most Valuable Player (ALCS MVP)			Yordan Alvarez	
American League Player of the Month		September	Kyle Tucker	
Darryl Kile Good Guy Award			Alex Bregman	
Fielding Bible Award		Shortstop	Carlos Correa	
Fred Hartman Award for Long and Meritorious Service to Baseball			Mike Acosta (Note: Acosta started with the Houston franchise in 1999 as a broadcast intern, eventually becoming the Astros Team Historian, and an expert on the history of the Astrodome. His achievements include significant effort in the design, concept, and establishment of the Astros Hall of Fame in 2019, and of the creation of the Astros Hall of Fame Board.)	
Gold Glove Award		First baseman	Yuli Gurriel	
Gold Glove Award		Shortstop	Carlos Correa	
Gold Glove Award		Team	Houston Astros	
Houston Astros		Most Valuable Player (MVP)	Carlos Correa	
Houston Astros		Pitcher of the Year	Lance McCullers Jr.	
Houston Astros		Rookie of the Year	Luis García	
MLB All-Star Game		Reserve second baseman	Jose Altuve	
MLB All-Star Game		Reserve outfielder	Michael Brantley	
MLB All-Star Game		Reserve shortstop	Carlos Correa	
MLB All-Star Game		Reserve pitcher	Ryan Pressly	
Platinum Glove Award			Carlos Correa	
The Sporting News AL All-Star		Shortstop	Carlos Correa	
The Sporting News AL All-Star		Outfielder	Kyle Tucker	
Topps All-Star Rookie Team		Right-handed pitcher	Luis García	

Other awards results

Name of award	Voting recipient(s) (Team)	Ref.
Heart & Hustle	Winner—Albies (ATL) • Nominee—Altuve (HOU)	
Roberto Clemente	Winner—Cruz (MIN/TB) • Nominee—Bregman (HOU)	

=== AL batting leaders ===
Category	Player	Figure	AL rank	Player	Figure	AL rank	Player	Figure	AL rank
Batting average (AVG)	Yuli Gurriel	.319	1st	Michael Brantley	.311	2nd	Kyle Tucker	.294	9th
On-base percentage (OBP)	Yuli Gurriel	.383	2nd	Carlos Correa	.366	9th			
Slugging percentage (SLG)	Kyle Tucker	.557	3rd	Yordan Alvarez	.531	10th			
On-base plus slugging percentage (OPS)	Kyle Tucker	.917	3rd	Yordan Alvarez	.877	9th			
Wins Above Replacement (WAR)—position players	Carlos Correa	7.2	1st	Kyle Tucker	5.7	8th			
Games played	Myles Straw**	158	9th—tied						
Plate appearances	Jose Altuve	678	8th						
Runs scored	Jose Altuve	117	3rd	Carlos Correa	104	7th			
Hits	Yuli Gurriel	169	8th—tied						
Doubles (2B)	Kyle Tucker	37	5th—tied	Yordan Alvarez	35	9th—tied			
Runs batted in (RBI)	Yordan Alvarez	104	8th						
Stolen bases (SB)	Myles Straw**	30	2nd—tied						
Singles	Yuli Gurriel	123	6th—tied						
Adjusted OPS+	Kyle Tucker	147	5th	Yordan Alvarez	136	8th			
Extra base hits	Kyle Tucker	70	10th—tied						
Times on base	Jose Altuve	237	8th—tied						
Runs created (RC)	Jose Altuve	105	10th						
Note: **Played first 98 games of season with Astros before trade to Cleveland Indians on July 30, 2021. Reference:

=== AL pitching leaders ===
Category	Player	Figure	AL rank	Player	Figure	AL rank
Earned run average (ERA)	Lance McCullers Jr.	3.16	2nd			
Wins	Lance McCullers Jr.	13	5th—tied			
Winning percentage	Lance McCullers Jr.	.722	2nd—tied	Zack Greinke	.647	10th—tied
Walks plus hits per inning pitched (WHIP)	Zack Greinke	1.170	5th	Lance McCullers Jr.	1.220	8th
Hits per nine innings pitched (H/9)	Lance McCullers Jr.	6.764	1st	Zack Greinke	8.632	8th
Bases on balls per nine innings pitched (BB/9)	Zack Greinke	1.895	2nd			
Strikeouts per nine innings pitched (K/9)	Lance McCullers Jr.	10.257	4th			
Games pitched	Ryne Stanek	72	4th—tied			
Saves	Ryan Pressly	26	4th			
Strikeouts (SO or K)	Lance McCullers Jr.	185	9th—tied			
Complete games	Zack Greinke	1	3rd—tied			
Home runs allowed (HR)	Zack Greinke	30	5th—tied			
Bases on balls allowed (BB)	Lance McCullers Jr.	76	1st			
Hits allowed	Zack Greinke	164	9th—tied			
Strikeout-to-walk ratio (K/BB)	Zack Greinke	3.333	9th			
Home runs per nine innings (HR/9)	Lance McCullers Jr.	0.721	1st			
Wild pitches	Luis García	9	9th—tied	Framber Valdez	9	9th—tied
Hits by pitch	Framber Valdez	11	3rd—tied	Lance McCullers Jr.	10	7th—tied
Games finished	Ryan Pressly	49	4th			
Adjusted ERA+	Lance McCullers Jr.	136	2nd			
Fielding Independent Pitching (FIP)	Lance McCullers Jr.	3.52	6th			
Adjusted pitching runs	Lance McCullers Jr.	22	6th			
Championship win probability added (cWPA)	Ryan Pressly	2.6	1st	Lance McCullers Jr.	2.0	8th

=== AL fielding leaders ===
Category	Player	Figure	AL rank	Player	Figure	AL rank
Defensive Wins Above Replacement—(dWAR, Baseball-Reference)	Carlos Correa	2.9	1st			
Putouts (P)	Martín Maldonado	1,058	4th	Yuli Gurriel	1,057	5th
Assists (A)	Carlos Correa	384	4th			

== Roster ==
2021 Houston Astros
Roster
Pitchers: 66 Bryan Abreu; 52 Pedro Báez; 64 Brandon Bielak; 0 Kent Emanuel; 77 Luis Garcia; 93 Yimi García; 61 Ralph Garza Jr.; 31 Kendall Graveman; 21 Zack Greinke; 69 Ryan Hartman; 63 Tyler Ivey; 39 Josh James; 53 Cristian Javier; 61 Seth Martinez; 88 Phil Maton; 43 Lance McCullers Jr.; 47 Rafael Montero; 17 Jake Odorizzi; 48 Enoli Paredes; 55 Ryan Pressly; 51 Austin Pruitt; 58 Brooks Raley; 68 Nivaldo Rodríguez; 70 Andre Scrubb; 38 Joe Smith; 71 Peter Solomon; 45 Ryne Stanek; 62 Blake Taylor; 65 José Urquidy; 59 Framber Valdez	Catchers: 18 Jason Castro; 15 Martín Maldonado; 11 Garrett Stubbs; Infielders: 27 Jose Altuve; 2 Alex Bregman; 1 Carlos Correa; 6 Alex De Goti; 16 Aledmys Díaz; 9 Robel García; 9 Marwin González; 10 Yuli Gurriel; 28 Taylor Jones; 13 Abraham Toro; 13 Jacob Wilson	Outfielders: 44 Yordan Alvarez; 23 Michael Brantley; 6,20 Chas McCormick; 6 Jake Meyers; 26 José Siri; 3 Myles Straw; 30 Kyle Tucker; Other batters: 31 Ronnie Dawson	Manager: 12 Dusty Baker; Coaches: 85 Javier Bracamonte (bullpen catcher); 37 Alex Cintrón (hitting); 29 Michael Collins (coach); 19 Joe Espada (bench); 54 Dan Firova (quality control); 22 Omar López (first base); 36 Josh Miller (pitching); 41 Bill Murphy (assistant pitching); 8 Gary Pettis (third base); 46 Troy Snitker (hitting); 56 Brent Strom (pitching)

== Minor league system ==
=== Teams ===
In advance of the 2021 season, Major League Baseball took direct control of, and restructured, Minor League Baseball in part with the intent of cost efficiency, and enhancing the experience and compensation for its players and directly managing their development plans. The legacy league names were replaced with generic names depicting their level of play. One significant change for Astros included aligning the Sugar Land Skeeters as their AAA club; the Skeeters were previously members of the Atlantic League of Professional Baseball and unaffiliated with any major league clubs. Sugar Land replaced the Round Rock Express.

Level	Team	League	Manager
AAA	Sugar Land Skeeters	Triple-A West	Mickey Storey
AA	Corpus Christi Hooks	Double-A Central	Gregorio Petit
High-A	Asheville Tourists	High-A East	Nate Shaver
Low-A	Fayetteville Woodpeckers	Low-A East	Rey Hernandez
Rookie	FCL Astros	Florida Complex League	Ricardo Rivera
Rookie	DSL Astros	Dominican Summer League	Carlos Lugo

=== Awards ===
- Pacific Coast League Pitcher of the Year:' Peter Solomon, RHP

== See also ==
- List of Major League Baseball batting champions
- List of Major League Baseball franchise postseason streaks
- List of Major League Baseball single-inning strikeout leaders
