= Ralph Garza Jr. =

American baseball player (born 1994)

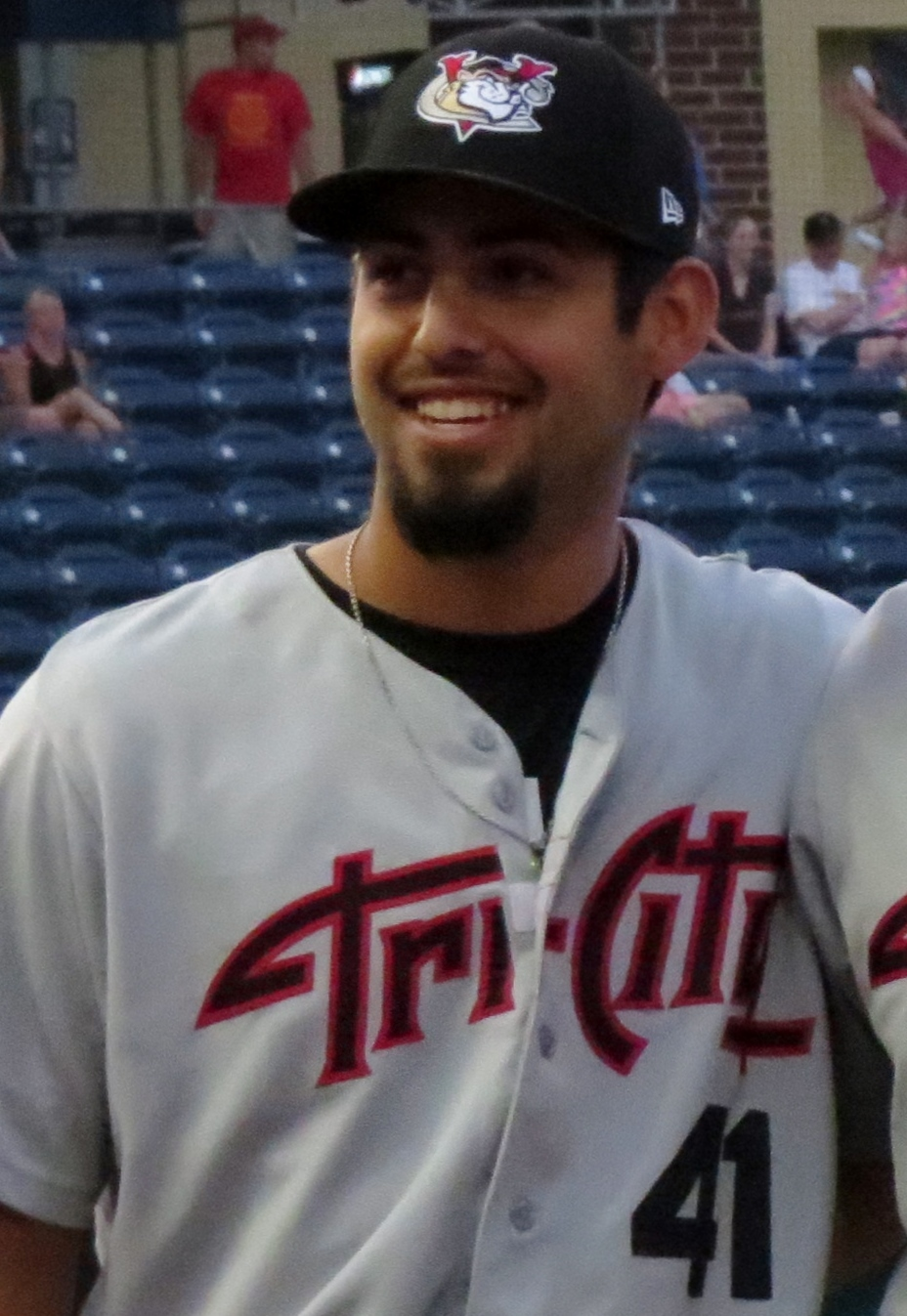
- Garza with the Tri-City ValleyCats in 2015

Free agent
- Pitcher
- Born: April 6, 1994 (age 32); Edinburg, Texas, U.S.
- Bats: Right Throws: Right

MLB debut
- May 29, 2021, for the Houston Astros

MLB statistics (through 2022 season)
- Win–loss record: 3–6
- Earned run average: 3.44
- Strikeouts: 46
- Stats at Baseball Reference

Teams
- Houston Astros (2021); Minnesota Twins (2021); Tampa Bay Rays (2022)

Ralph Albert Garza Jr. (born April 6, 1994) is an American professional baseball pitcher who is a free agent. He has previously played for the Houston Astros, Minnesota Twins, and Tampa Bay Rays. He was drafted by the Astros in the 26th round of the 2015 Major League Baseball draft.

== Professional career ==
=== Houston Astros ===
Garza was drafted by the Houston Astros in the 26th round, 769th overall, of the 2015 Major League Baseball draft out of the University of Oklahoma. He made his professional debut with the Low-A Tri-City ValleyCats.

Garza split the 2016 season between the Single-A Quad Cities River Bandits and the High-A Lancaster JetHawks, posting a 6–5 record and 3.35 ERA with 64 strikeouts. In 2017, he played for the High-A Buies Creek Astros, the Double-A Corpus Christi Hooks, and the Triple-A Fresno Grizzlies, accumulating a 3–3 record and 4.22 ERA in 36 appearances. He split the 2018 season between Fresno and Corpus Christi, pitching to a 7–2 record and 3.51 ERA in 66.2 innings of work.

He spent 2019 in Triple-A with the Round Rock Express, registering an 8–1 record and 4.04 ERA in 42 appearances. Garza did not play in a game in 2020 due to the cancellation of the minor league season because of the COVID-19 pandemic. He was added to the Astros’ 60-man player pool for the season, but did not appear for the team. He was assigned to the Triple-A Sugar Land Skeeters to begin the 2021 season, and recorded 6.2 scoreless innings across 3 games to begin the year.

On May 26, 2021, the Astros selected Garza for the 40-man roster and promoted to the major leagues for the first time. Garza made his MLB debut on May 29, pitching in relief in the 12th inning of a game against the San Diego Padres. In the game, he notched his first major league strikeout, punching out Padres catcher Víctor Caratini, but surrendered a 3-run home run to Wil Myers and was credited with the loss. Garza won his first game as a pitcher on July 11. He was sent to relieve Blake Taylor in the eighth inning with the Astros down 7-2. He pitched the final five outs and allowed zero runs on three strikeouts and walks as the Astros won in the bottom of the ninth inning.

On August 1, Garza was designated for assignment by the Astros.

=== Minnesota Twins ===
On August 4, 2021, Garza was claimed off of waivers by the Minnesota Twins. He was assigned to the Triple-A St. Paul Saints. He made three appearances for St. Paul, allowing three runs in 3 2/3 innings. He was designated for assignment by the Twins on March 22, 2022.

=== Tampa Bay Rays ===
On March 24, 2022, Garza was claimed off waivers by the Boston Red Sox.

On April 7, 2022, Garza was claimed off of waivers by the Tampa Bay Rays, after he was designated for assignment by the Red Sox. In 19 games, he posted a 3.34 ERA in 35 innings. He was designated for assignment on August 20. Garza cleared waivers and was sent outright to the Triple-A Durham Bulls on August 23. He elected free agency following the season on November 10.

=== Toros de Tijuana ===
On January 8, 2024, Garza signed with the Toros de Tijuana of the Mexican League. In 41 appearances for Tijuana, he compiled a 3–2 record and 1.30 ERA with 28 strikeouts across 34 2/3 innings pitched.

Garza made 52 appearances for the Toros during the 2025 campaign, accumulating a 2-4 record and 2.56 ERA with 42 strikeouts and four saves across 45 2/3 innings pitched. He became a free agent following the season.

=== Leones de Yucatán ===
On May 1, 2026, Garza signed with the Leones de Yucatán of the Mexican League. In four appearances, he posted a 0–1 record with a 7.36 ERA, three walks, and no strikeouts across 3 2/3 innings pitched. On May 9, Garza was waived by Yucatán.

=== Dorados de Chihuahua ===
On May 10, 2026, Garza was claimed off waivers by the Dorados de Chihuahua of the Mexican Baseball League. In 38 games with Chihuahua he threw 33 innings of relief going 3-2 with a 4.91 ERA and 36 strikeouts. He was released on November 9.
