= Ronnie Dawson (baseball) =

American baseball player (born 1995)

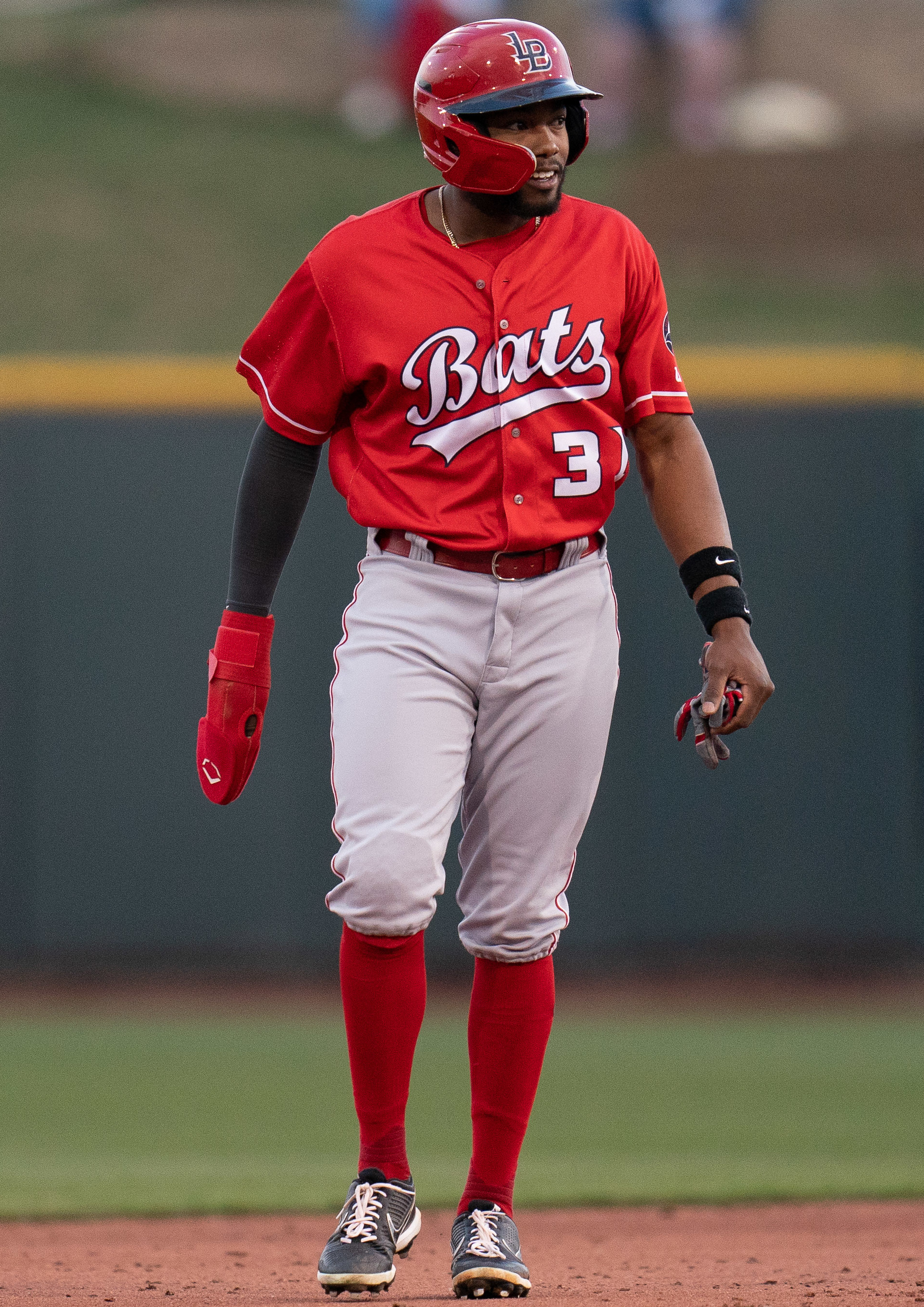
- Dawson with the Louisville Bats in 2022

Rakuten Monkeys – No. 84
- Outfielder
- Born: May 19, 1995 (age 31); Grove City, Ohio, U.S.
- Bats: Left Throws: Right

Professional debut
- MLB: April 14, 2021, for the Houston Astros
- KBO: July 22, 2023, for the Kiwoom Heroes
- CPBL: July 8, 2026, for the Rakuten Monkeys

MLB statistics (through 2022 season)
- Batting average: .125
- Home runs: 0
- Runs batted in: 0

KBO statistics (through 2024 season)
- Batting average: .332
- Home runs: 14
- Runs batted in: 86

CPBL statistics (through August 24, 2026)
- Batting average: .229
- Home runs: 0
- Runs batted in: 0
- Stats at Baseball Reference

Teams
- Houston Astros (2021); Cincinnati Reds (2022); Kiwoom Heroes (2023–2024); Rakuten Monkeys (2026–present)

Ronnie Silas Dawson Jr. (born May 19, 1995) is an American professional baseball outfielder for the Rakuten Monkeys of the Chinese Professional Baseball League (CPBL). The Houston Astros selected him with the 62nd overall selection of the 2016 MLB draft. He has previously played in Major League Baseball (MLB) for the Astros and Cincinnati Reds, and in the KBO League for the Kiwoom Heroes.

== Amateur career ==
Dawson attended Licking Heights High School in Pataskala, Ohio, where he played baseball and football. He focused on football until his junior year, when he tore his anterior cruciate ligament in his right knee. He had knee surgery before his senior year, and missed the football season. He returned to the baseball team as a senior, in 2013, and had a .576 batting average. The Columbus Dispatch named Dawson their All-Metro Team Player of the Year. He attended Ohio State University, and played college baseball for the Ohio State Buckeyes. He also played collegiate summer baseball for the Chillicothe Paints of the Prospect League. In 2015, he played collegiate summer baseball with the Orleans Firebirds of the Cape Cod Baseball League, and was named a league all-star.

== Professional career ==
=== Houston Astros ===
The Houston Astros selected Dawson in the second round, with the 61st overall selection, of the 2016 Major League Baseball draft. He signed with the Astros, receiving a $1,056,800 signing bonus, and the Astros assigned him to the Tri-City ValleyCats of the Low–A New York-Penn League, where he spent all of 2016, batting .225 with seven home runs and 36 RBIs. In 2017, he played for the Quad Cities River Bandits of the Single–A Midwest League and the Buies Creek Astros of the High–A Carolina League, posting a combined .278 batting average with 14 home runs, 67 RBIs, and an .800 OPS. He began the 2018 season with Buies Creek, and was promoted to the Corpus Christi Hooks of the Double–A Texas League during the season.

The Astros invited Dawson to spring training as a non-roster player in 2019. After splitting the 2019 season between Corpus Christi and the Triple-A Round Rock Express, Dawson did not play in a game in 2020 due to the cancellation of the 2020 Minor League Baseball season because of the COVID-19 pandemic.

On April 14, 2021, the Astros promoted Dawson to the majors for the first time. He made his major league debut that day as the Astros’ designated hitter against the Detroit Tigers and recorded his first major league hit, a single off of Alex Lange. On April 20, Dawson was removed from the 40-man roster. In his brief stint, Dawson appeared in three games, recording one hit in six plate appearances.

=== Cincinnati Reds ===
On December 8, 2021, the Cincinnati Reds selected Dawson from the Astros organization in the minor league phase of the Rule 5 draft. He was assigned to the Triple-A Louisville Bats to begin the 2022 season.

On May 4, 2022, Dawson was selected to the 40-man and active rosters after Tyler Naquin and Nick Senzel were placed on the COVID-19 injured list. In his season debut the next day, Dawson went 0-for-3 with two strikeouts in a 10–5 loss against the Milwaukee Brewers. He was returned to Triple-A Louisville a day later. Dawson was again selected to the active roster on May 9 after Mike Moustakas was placed on the COVID injured list. He was again returned to Louisville the next day, this time without making an appearance.

Spending the remainder of the season with the Bats, Dawson appeared in 116 games, slashing .252/.339/.394 with 11 home runs, 43 RBI, and 11 stolen bases. He elected free agency following the season on November 10, 2022.

=== Lexington Counter Clocks ===
On April 12, 2023, Dawson signed with the Lexington Counter Clocks of the Atlantic League of Professional Baseball. In 64 games for Lexington, Dawson batted .282/.363/.512 with 13 home runs, 39 RBI, and 13 stolen bases.

=== Kiwoom Heroes ===
On July 13, 2023, Dawson signed an $85,000 contract with the Kiwoom Heroes of the KBO League. In 57 games for Kiwoom, he hit .336/.399/.454 with 3 home runs, 29 RBI, and 9 stolen bases.

On December 11, 2023, Dawson re-signed with the Heroes on a one-year contract for the 2024 season. In 95 games for Kiwoom, he batted .330/.399/.508 with 11 home runs, 57 RBI, and two stolen bases. Dawson became a free agent following the season.

=== Lexington Legends ===
On August 13, 2025, Dawson signed with the Lexington Legends of the Atlantic League of Professional Baseball. In 12 appearances for the Legends, Dawson hit .209/.320/.372 with two home runs and seven RBI.

On January 6, 2026, Dawson signed with the Caliente de Durango of the Mexican League. However, he failed to make the Opening Day roster and was released prior to the start of the season on April 14. Following his released from Durango, Dawson returned to the Legends. In 31 appearances for Lexington, he batted .315/.386/.581 with eight home runs, 28 RBI, and two stolen bases.

=== Rakuten Monkeys ===
On June 24, 2026, Dawson's contract was purchased by the Rakuten Monkeys of the Chinese Professional Baseball League.

== Personal life ==
As a child, Dawson served as a batboy for the Columbus Clippers of the Triple-A International League.

== See also ==
- Rule 5 draft results
