= Robel García =

Dominican baseball player (born 1993)

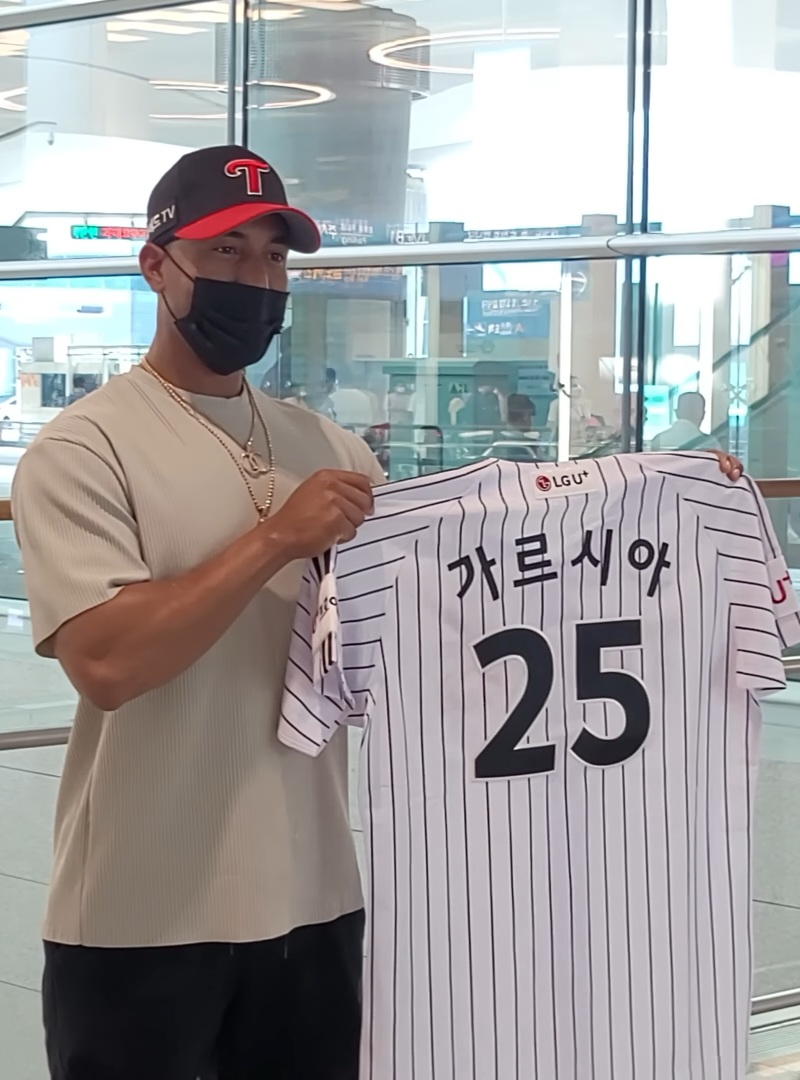
- Garcia with the LG Twins

Parma Baseball – No. 15
- Second baseman / Left fielder
- Born: March 28, 1993 (age 33); Las Matas de Farfán, Dominican Republic
- Batted: Switch Threw: Right

Professional debut
- MLB: July 3, 2019, for the Chicago Cubs
- KBO: July 26, 2022, for the LG Twins

Last appearance
- MLB: September 1, 2021, for the Houston Astros
- KBO: October 5, 2022, for the LG Twins

MLB statistics
- Batting average: .174
- Home runs: 6
- Runs batted in: 19

KBO statistics
- Batting average: .206
- Home runs: 4
- Runs batted in: 19
- Stats at Baseball Reference

Teams
- Chicago Cubs (2019); Houston Astros (2021); LG Twins (2022)

Robel Estiwal García Rodriguez (born March 28, 1993) is an Italian-Dominican professional baseball infielder for Parma Baseball of the Serie A. He has previously played in Major League Baseball (MLB) for the Chicago Cubs and Houston Astros, and in the KBO League for the LG Twins.

== Career ==
=== Cleveland Indians ===
García signed with the Cleveland Indians as an international free agent out of the Dominican Republic on June 20, 2010, at 17 years old. He made his professional debut with the rookie-level Arizona League Indians, hitting .164 over 43 appearances. García returned to the AZL Indians for the 2011 campaign, batting .284/.371/.544 with six home runs, 24 RBI, and seven stolen bases.

García split the 2012 season between the Low-A Mahoning Valley Scrappers and Single-A Lake County Captains, hitting .217/.304/.301 with three home runs, 39 RBI, and five stolen bases across 119 combined appearances. García spent 2013 with both affiliates as well, playing in 67 games and slashing .207/.304/.356 with five home runs, 26 RBI, and seven stolen bases. After four seasons, he was released by the Indians on his 21st birthday on March 28, 2014. He had topped out in the Single–A Midwest League in 2012 and 2013.

=== Fortitudo Bologna ===
After his release, García moved to Verona to be with his Dominican-Italian wife and their children. He began playing independent baseball there in 2016 and joined Redskins Imola and then Fortitudo Bologna of the Italian Baseball League in 2017. In 2018, he played for UnipolSai Bologna and was a member of the Italy national baseball team that played in the 2018 Super 6 baseball tournament.

=== Chicago Cubs ===
After being spotted during an exhibition series for Italy in the Arizona Instructional League, García signed a minor league contract with the Chicago Cubs on October 31, 2018. He started the 2019 season with the Double-A Tennessee Smokies before being promoted to the Triple-A Iowa Cubs after 22 games.

On July 3, 2019, the Cubs selected García's contract and promoted him to the major leagues for the first time. He made his debut that night as a pinch hitter for Brandon Kintzler and struck out in his first at-bat. On July 4, García tripled off Jordan Lyles for his first MLB hit. He also singled and hit a solo home run in the game against the Pittsburgh Pirates.

=== Cincinnati Reds ===
García was claimed off waivers by the Cincinnati Reds on July 26, 2020. García did not play in a game for Cincinnati in 2020.

=== Houston Astros ===
On October 26, 2020, García was claimed off waivers by the New York Mets. On February 1, 2021, García was designated for assignment following the acquisition of Jordan Yamamoto. On February 3, García was claimed off waivers by the Los Angeles Angels. On February 25, García was designated for assignment by the Angels following the waiver claim of Jack Mayfield.

On February 27, 2021, García was claimed off waivers by the Houston Astros. García played in 46 games for the Astros in 2021, struggling to a .151 batting average with one home runs and eight RBI. On September 15, the Astros designated García for assignment. On September 18, he cleared waivers and was sent outright to the Triple-A Sugar Land Skeeters.

=== Chicago Cubs (second stint) ===
On March 21, 2022, García signed a minor league contract with the Chicago Cubs. García played in 41 games for the Triple-A Iowa Cubs, hitting .295 with 12 home runs and 30 RBI. On June 4, the Cubs released García to allow him to pursue an opportunity overseas.

=== LG Twins ===
On June 5, 2022, García signed with the LG Twins of the KBO League. In 39 games for the Twins, he slashed .206/.308/.353 with four home runs, 19 RBI, and four stolen bases. García was released by the team on October 7.

=== Leones de Yucatán ===
On May 12, 2023, García signed with the Leones de Yucatán of the Mexican League. In 13 games, he batted .192/.309/.255 with 9 hits and 5 RBI. García was released on May 30.

=== Senadores de Caracas ===
On June 6, 2023, García signed with the Senadores de Caracas of the Venezuelan Major League. He appeared in 3 games, with 2 hits in 10 at-bats.

=== Unipolsai Fortitudo Bologna ===
On July 25, 2023, García signed with the UnipolSai Bologna of the Italian Baseball League. In 3 games for Bologna, he went 2-for-7 (.286) with 3 RBI and 1 walk. García became a free agent following the season.

=== Delfines de La Guaira ===
On April 25, 2024, García returned to the Venezuelan Major League, with the Delfines de La Guaira. In 27 games, he batted .303/.430/.596 with 7 home runs.

=== Guerreros de Lara ===
On May 14, 2025, García signed with the Guerreros de Lara of the Venezuelan Major League. He appeared in 13 games with a .170 batting average.

=== Parma Baseball ===
On January 6, 2026, Parma Baseball of the Italian Baseball League announced the signing of García.

== Personal life ==
García is a citizen of the Dominican Republic and a naturalized Italian citizen. His wife, with whom he has at least three children, is Dominican-Italian.
