= Alex De Goti =

American baseball player (born 1994)

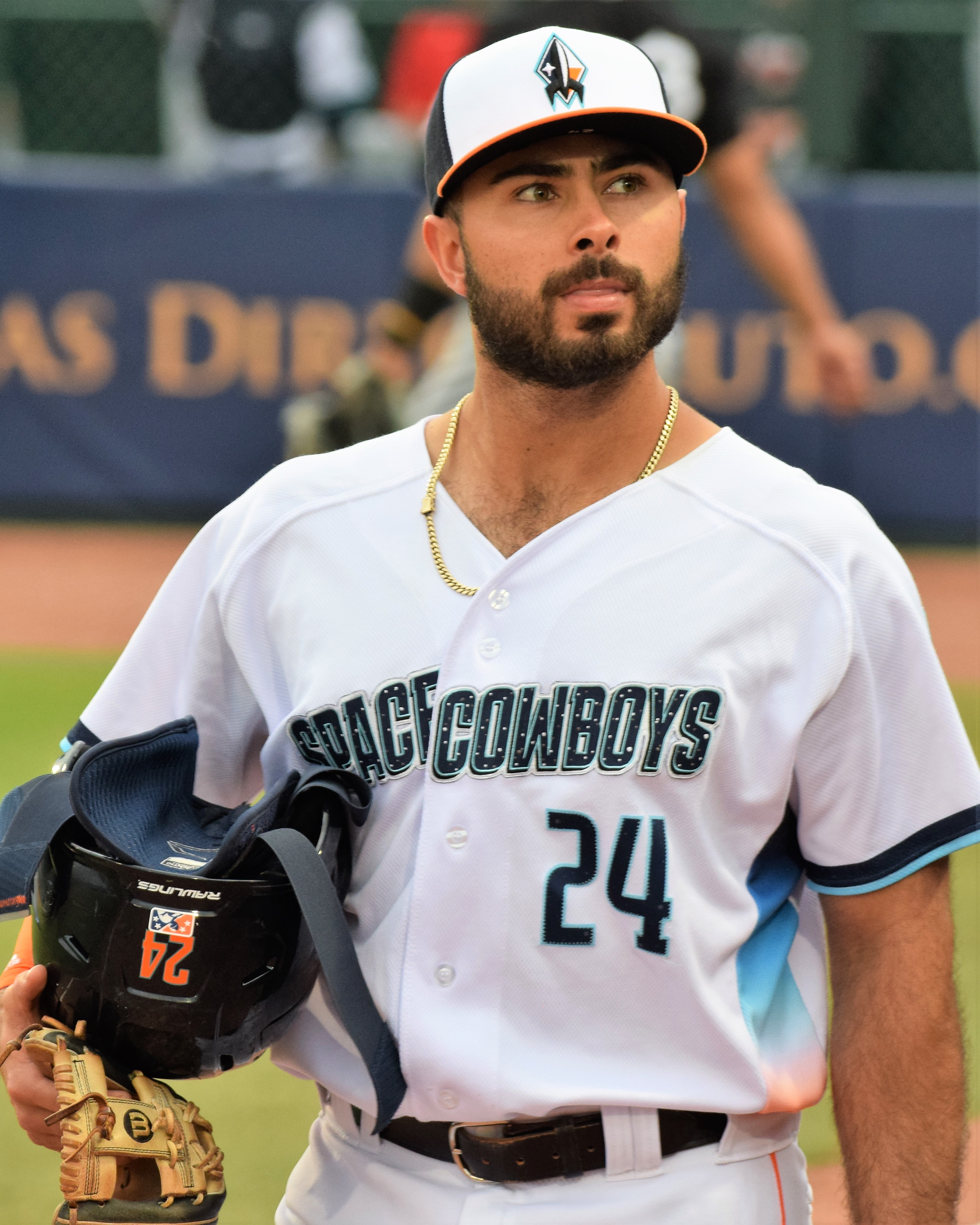
- De Goti with the Sugar Land Space Cowboys in 2022

Free agent
- Infielder
- Born: August 19, 1994 (age 31); Miami, Florida, U.S.
- Bats: Right Throws: Right

MLB debut
- April 16, 2021, for the Houston Astros

MLB statistics (through 2021 season)
- Batting average: .333
- Home runs: 0
- Runs batted in: 1
- Stats at Baseball Reference

Teams
- Houston Astros (2021)

Alexander De Goti (born August 19, 1994) is an American professional baseball infielder who is a free agent. The Houston Astros drafted him in the 15th round of the 2016 MLB draft. He has previously played in Major League Baseball (MLB) for the Astros.

== Career ==
=== Houston Astros ===
After attending Long Beach State University, De Goti was drafted in the 15th round of the 2016 Major League Baseball draft out of Barry University.

De Goti made his professional debut in 2016 for the short-season Single-A Tri-City ValleyCats, and played 63 games for the club. In 2017, he split the majority of the season between the Single-A Quad Cities River Bandits and the advanced Single-A Buies Creek Astros, also appearing in 5 games for the Triple-A Fresno Grizzlies. Between the three teams, De Goti slashed .236/.341/.356 with 8 home runs and 32 RBI in 109 total games. In 2018, De Goti split the year between Fresno and the Double-A Corpus Christi Hooks, with a batting line of .283/.335/.440 to go along with career-highs in both home runs (12) and RBI (62). The next year, De Goti spent the entire season in Triple-A with the Round Rock Express, hitting .277/.347/.443 with new career-highs in home runs (15) and RBI (70) in 127 games for the club.

De Goti did not play in a game in 2020 due to the cancellation of the Minor League Baseball season because of the COVID-19 pandemic. He was added to the Astros’ 60-man player pool for the 2020 season. He was invited to Spring Training with the Astros in 2021 but did not make the big league club and was assigned to the Triple-A Sugar Land Skeeters to begin the season.

On April 14, 2021, the Astros promoted De Goti to the majors for the first time. On April 16, De Goti made his MLB debut as the starting second baseman against the Seattle Mariners. In the game, he recorded his first major league hit, an RBI single off Mariners starter Yusei Kikuchi. On April 20, De Goti was removed from the 40-man roster. In his brief stint, De Goti appeared in 2 games and collected 2 hits in 7 plate appearances.

De Goti returned to the Sugar Land Space Cowboys for the 2022 season. On August 19, he drove in five runners over three plate appearances in the sixth inning, leading a franchise-record 17 runs scored in one inning. The feat occurred during the second game of the doubleheader versus the Oklahoma City Dodgers as the Space Cowboys won, 21–4. He elected free agency following the season on November 10, 2022.

=== Miami Marlins ===
On December 1, 2022, De Goti signed a minor league contract with the Miami Marlins organization. De Goti made four appearances for the Triple-A Jacksonville Jumbo Shrimp to begin the 2023 season, going 2-for-15 (.133) with one home run and four RBI.

=== Minnesota Twins ===
On April 12, 2023, De Goti was traded to the Minnesota Twins in exchange for cash considerations. In 51 games for the Triple–A St. Paul Saints, he batted .184/.339/.270 with 1 home run and 9 RBI. On August 3, De Goti was released by the Twins organization.

=== Texas Rangers ===
On January 26, 2024, De Goti signed a minor league contract with the Texas Rangers. In 75 games split between the Double-A Frisco RoughRiders and Triple-A Round Rock Express, he batted .225/.323/.279 with one home run, 12 RBI, and 11 stolen bases. De Goti elected free agency following the season on November 4.

On January 25, 2025, De Goti re-signed with the Rangers organization on a minor league contract. He made 91 appearances for Triple-A Round Rock, batting .229/.330/.301 with three home runs, 33 RBI, and three stolen bases. De Goti elected free agency following the season on November 6.
