= Josh Miller (baseball) =

American baseball coach (born 1979)

Houston Astros – No. 36
- Coach
- Born: February 7, 1979 (age 47); Melbourne Beach, Florida, U.S.
- Bats: Right Throws: Right
- Stats at Baseball Reference

Teams
- As coach: Houston Astros (2019–present)

Career highlights and awards
- World Series champion (2022)

Joshua Benjamin Miller (born February 7, 1979) is an American professional baseball coach for the Houston Astros of Major League Baseball (MLB). He is a former professional baseball pitcher who played in the Philadelphia Phillies' and Astros' organizations, in Chinese Professional Baseball League (CPBL), the Venezuelan Professional Baseball League, and in the Atlantic League of Professional Baseball.

== Education and career ==
Miller attended Melbourne High School, Brevard College, and North Carolina State University. He was drafted by the Philadelphia Phillies in the 32nd round of the 2001 MLB draft. He played in minor and independent baseball from 2001 through 2010, primarily in both the Phillies' and Houston Astros' organizations. In 2009, he made four appearances for La New Bears of the Chinese Professional Baseball League (CPBL). He then played for the Tigres de Aragua in the 2009–10 campaign in the Venezuelan Professional Baseball League. Miller also played in 2009 for the Somerset Patriots, competing in the independent Atlantic League of Professional Baseball, and last pitched professionally for the Patriots in 2010.

Miller began to work for the Astros organization as a scout, coach, and coordinator from 2011 through 2018. The Astros hired Miller as their bullpen coach before the 2019 season. During that time, he worked under the tutelage of Brent Strom, who helped to mastermind an era of some of the greatest Astros pitching. After the Astros' 2021 World Series defeat to the Atlanta Braves, Strom departed, leaving Miller the visible choice to become next pitching coach.

In 2022, the Astros won 106 games, the second-highest total in franchise history. They advanced to the World Series and defeated the Philadelphia Phillies in six games to give Miller his first career World Series title. Astros pitchers led the American League (AL) in earned run average (2.90 ERA), and walks plus hits per inning pitched (WHIP, 1.092), while throwing two no-hitters, including one in Game 4 of the World Series. Two no-hitters thrown by one team tied an MLB record, while Cristian Javier and Ryan Pressly each estab;lished major league records by becoming the first starting pitcher and reliever to toss multiple combined no-hit efforts.

Sporting positions
Preceded by Doug White	Houston Astros bullpen coach 2019—2021	Succeeded by Bill Murphy
Preceded by Brent Strom	Houston Astros pitching coach 2022—present	Succeeded by Incumbent
