= Peter Solomon (baseball) =

American baseball player (born 1996)

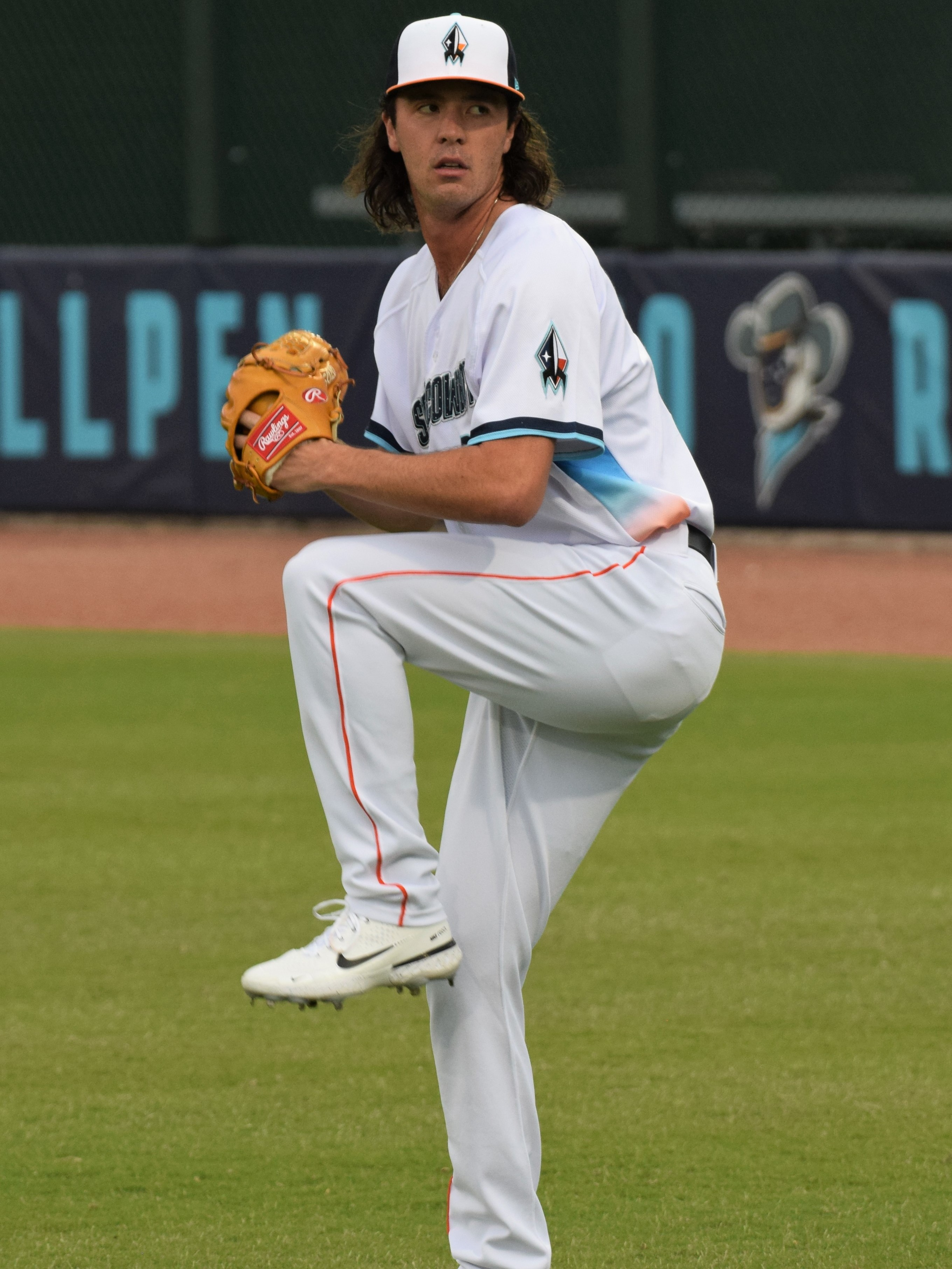
- Solomon with the Sugar Land Space Cowboys in 2022

Free agent
- Pitcher
- Born: August 16, 1996 (age 30); Washington, D.C., U.S.
- Bats: Right Throws: Right

MLB debut
- April 18, 2021, for the Houston Astros

MLB statistics (through 2023 season)
- Win–loss record: 1–0
- Earned run average: 6.59
- Strikeouts: 16
- Stats at Baseball Reference

Teams
- Houston Astros (2021); Arizona Diamondbacks (2023)

Peter Joseph Solomon (born August 16, 1996) is an American professional baseball pitcher who is a free agent. He played college baseball at the University of Notre Dame. He has previously played in Major League Baseball (MLB) for the Houston Astros and Arizona Diamondbacks.

== Amateur career ==
Solomon attended Mount Saint Joseph High School in Baltimore, Maryland. He was drafted by the San Diego Padres in the 21st round of the 2014 MLB draft, but did not sign. He played college baseball at the University of Notre Dame for the Fighting Irish. After his sophomore season of college in 2016, he played collegiate summer baseball for the Harwich Mariners of the Cape Cod Baseball League, where he was named a league all-star.

== Professional career ==
=== Houston Astros ===
The Houston Astros selected Solomon in the fourth round of the 2017 MLB draft and signed. He appeared in one game for the Gulf Coast League Astros in 2017. He split the 2018 season between the Quad Cities River Bandits and the Buies Creek Astros, going a combined 9–1 with a 2.32 ERA and 114 strikeouts over 100 2/3 innings. Solomon appeared in two games for the Fayetteville Woodpeckers in 2019, before undergoing Tommy John Surgery and missing the remainder of that season.

Solomon did not play a minor league game in 2020 due to the cancellation of the minor league season caused by the COVID-19 pandemic. The Astros added Solomon to their 40-man roster after the 2020 season. On April 17, 2021, Solomon was promoted to the major leagues for the first time. He made his MLB debut the next day, pitching a scoreless inning of relief against the Seattle Mariners. Solomon picked up his first win on September 19, 2021, after working four innings in relief against the Arizona Diamondbacks, a game in which the Astros won 7–6.

On October 5, 2021, Minor League Baseball announced that Sugar Land Skeeters right-hander Peter Solomon was named the Triple A West Pitcher of the Year.

On September 1, 2022, the Astros designated Solomon for assignment.

=== Pittsburgh Pirates ===
On September 4, 2022, Solomon was claimed off waivers by the Pittsburgh Pirates and optioned to the Triple-A Indianapolis Indians. In 4 games (3 starts) for Indianapolis, he registered an 8.53 ERA with 10 strikeouts in 12 2/3 innings pitched. On November 10, Solomon was removed from the 40-man roster and sent outright to Triple–A.

=== Arizona Diamondbacks ===
On December 7, 2022, the Arizona Diamondbacks selected Solomon in the minor league phase of the Rule 5 draft. He was selected to the Major League roster on April 9, 2023. Solomon made 5 appearances for the Diamondbacks, struggling immensely to a 12.15 ERA with 6 strikeouts in 13.1 innings pitched. On May 29, he was designated for assignment by Arizona following the activation of Kristian Robinson. He cleared waivers and was sent outright to the Triple-A Reno Aces on June 2. On October 3, Solomon elected free agency.

=== High Point Rockers ===
On April 15, 2024, Solomon signed with the High Point Rockers of the Atlantic League of Professional Baseball. In 3 starts for the Rockers, Solomon logged a 5.68 ERA with 19 strikeouts across 12 2/3 innings pitched.

=== Texas Rangers ===
On May 10, 2024, Solomon signed a minor league contract with the Texas Rangers. In 22 appearances (11 starts) for the Triple-A Round Rock Express, he compiled a 6-5 record and 6.50 ERA with 70 strikeouts over 72 innings of work. Solomon elected free agency following the season on November 4.

=== Chicago Cubs ===
On April 16, 2025, Solomon signed with the High Point Rockers of the Atlantic League of Professional Baseball. However, on April 21, Solomon signed a minor league contract with the Chicago Cubs. In six starts for the Triple-A Iowa Cubs, he struggled to an 0-2 record and 7.50 ERA with 22 strikeouts over 18 innings of work. Solomon was released by the Cubs organization on August 8.

== See also ==
- Rule 5 draft results
