= List of Washington Nationals managers =

The Washington Nationals are an American professional baseball franchise that has been based in Washington, D.C., since 2005. They are members of the National League (NL) East Division in Major League Baseball (MLB). The team began playing in 1969 as an expansion team in Montreal, Quebec, then known as the Montreal Expos. There have been 18 different managers in the franchise's history. The team has played its home games at the Nationals Park since 2008. The Nationals are owned by Mark Lerner, with Ani Kilambi as their general manager.

The Expos' first manager was Gene Mauch, who managed for six seasons. Felipe Alou is the franchise's all-time leader in regular season games managed (1,408) and regular season game wins (691). Jim Fanning is the only Expos manager to have gone into the post-season. Buck Rodgers and Alou are the only managers to have won the NL Manager of the Year Award with the Expos, in 1987 and 1994 respectively. Karl Kuehl, Jim Fanning, and Tom Runnells all spent their entire MLB managing careers with the Expos/Nationals.

Frank Robinson managed the team during its last three seasons in Montreal (2002–2004) and its first two seasons in Washington (2005–2006), after which the Nationals did not renew his contract. Manny Acta took over in 2007, but was fired during the 2009 season. Jim Riggleman, the bench coach, was named interim manager to replace Acta, and was promoted to the position full-time for the 2010 season. After Riggleman resigned during the 2011 season and John McLaren ran the team for three games as an interim manager, the team hired veteran manager Davey Johnson, who had previously served as an advisor to Mike Rizzo. Johnson led the team to the 2012 National League East title and the franchise's first playoff berth since moving to Washington and was 2012's NL Manager of the Year, but the team did not advance past the 2012 National League Division Series. Johnson retired after the 2013 season.

Matt Williams took over in 2014, leading the team to another National League East title that season, and was 2014 NL Manager of the Year, but the team did not advance past the 2014 NLDS, and Williams was fired after an unsuccessful second year in 2015. Dusty Baker managed the team in 2016 and 2017, leading Washington to consecutive National League East titles, but the team did not advance beyond the NLDS in either season, losing in both the 2016 and 2017 NLDS, and Baker's contract was not renewed after the 2017 season.

The Nationals hired Dave Martinez in October 2017 to take the helm in 2018. In 2019, he led the team from a wild-card berth to the franchise's first World Series appearance, which the Nationals won, the first World Series championship for the franchise as well as the first for a Washington, D.C.-based MLB team since 1924. Six straight losing seasons followed, however, and the Nationals fired Martinez during the 2025 season; his 500 victories are the most for a Nationals manager since the team moved to Washington in 2005. His bench coach, Miguel Cairo, served as the Nationals' interim manager for the rest of the 2025 season, but the team did not hire him as the new manager after the season. On October 31, 2025, the Nationals announced that they had hired Blake Butera as their next manager.

== Key ==
#	Number of managers^{[a]}
GM	Regular season games managed
W	Regular season wins
L	Regular season losses
Win%	Winning percentage
PGM	Playoff games managed
PW	Playoff wins
PL	Playoff losses
*	Spent entire MLB managing career with the Expos/Nationals

== Managers ==
Notes: Managers from 1969 through 2004 are of the Montreal Expos; those from 2005 to the present are of the Washington Nationals. Statistics are correct as of the end of the 2026 Major League Baseball season.

#	Image	Name	Term	GM	W	L	Win%	PGM	PW	PL	Notes	Reference
1		Gene Mauch	1969–1975	1126	499	627	.443	—	—	—		
2		Karl Kuehl*	1976	128	43	85	.336	—	—	—		
3		Charlie Fox	1976	34	12	22	.353	—	—	—		
4		Dick Williams	1977–1981	727	380	347	.523	—	—	—		
5		Jim Fanning*	1981–1982	189	102	87	.540	10	5	5	Won 1981 NLDS, first postseason series win in franchise history	
6		Bill Virdon	1983–1984	293	146	147	.497	—	—	—		
—		Jim Fanning*	1984	30	14	16	.467	—	—	—		
7		Buck Rodgers	1985–1991	1019	520	499	.510	—	—	—	1987 NL Manager of the Year	
8		Tom Runnells*	1991–1992	149	68	81	.456	—	—	—		
9		Felipe Alou	1992–2001	1408	691	717	.491	—	—	—	1994 NL Manager of the Year	
10		Jeff Torborg	2001	109	47	62	.431	—	—	—		
11		Frank Robinson^{[b]}	2002–2006	810	385	425	.475	—	—	—	The Expos' last manager (2002–2004) and the Nationals' first manager (2005–2006)	
12		Manny Acta	2007–2009	410	158	252	.385	—	—	—		
13		Jim Riggleman	2009–2011	312	140	172	.449	—	—	—		
14		John McLaren	2011	3	2	1	.667	—	—	—	Interim manager	
15		Davey Johnson	2011–2013	407	224	183	.550	5	2	3	Won NL East 2012; 2012 NL Manager of the Year	
16		Matt Williams*	2014–2015	324	179	145	.552	4	1	3	Won NL East 2014; 2014 NL Manager of the Year	
17		Dusty Baker	2016–2017	324	192	132	.593	10	4	6	Won NL East 2016, 2017	
18		Dave Martinez*	2018–2025	1122	500	622	.446	17	12	5	Won 2019 Wild Card Game, 2019 NLDS, 2019 NLCS, and 2019 World Series; franchise's first World Series appearance; first postseason series wins and first World Series championship for a Washington, D.C.-based MLB team since 1924	
19		Miguel Cairo	2025	72	29	43	.403	—	—	—	Interim manager	
20		Blake Butera	2026–present	162	77	85	.475	—	—	—		

== Notes ==
- ^{a} A running total of the number of managers of the Expos/Nationals. Thus, any manager who has two or more separate terms as a manager is only counted once.
- ^{b} Frank Robinson was inducted into the Baseball Hall of Fame in 1982 as a player, but was never inducted into the Hall of Fame as a manager.
