= Blake Taylor =

American baseball player (born 1995)

- Pitcher
- Born: August 17, 1995 (age 31); Orange, California, U.S.
- Batted: Left Threw: Left

MLB debut
- July 24, 2020, for the Houston Astros

Last MLB appearance
- June 3, 2022, for the Houston Astros

MLB statistics
- Win–loss record: 7–6
- Earned run average: 3.06
- Strikeouts: 67
- Stats at Baseball Reference

Teams
- Houston Astros (2020–2022)

Blake Michael Taylor (born August 17, 1995) is an American former professional baseball pitcher. He played in Major League Baseball (MLB) for the Houston Astros. Taylor was drafted by the Pittsburgh Pirates in the 2nd round of the 2013 MLB draft. He is a member of the Great Britain national team.

== Career ==
Taylor attended Dana Hills High School in Dana Point, California.

=== Pittsburgh Pirates ===
Taylor was drafted by the Pittsburgh Pirates in the 2nd round, with the 51st overall selection, of the 2013 Major League Baseball draft. Taylor spent his professional debut season of 2013 with the rookie–level GCL Pirates, going 0–2 with a 2.57 ERA over 21 innings.

=== New York Mets ===
On June 14, 2014, Taylor was traded to the New York Mets as the PTBNL in a trade that had also sent Zack Thornton to the Mets, in exchange for Ike Davis. Taylor split the 2014 season between the GCL Mets and the Kingsport Mets, going a combined 4–1 with a 3.95 ERA over 40 1/3 innings.

In 2015, Taylor split the season between the GCL and the Brooklyn Cyclones, combining to go 0–0 with a 2.25 ERA over 12 innings. In 2016, Taylor made five appearances for Kingsport, going 0–0 with a 4.15 ERA in 8 2/3 innings. In 2017, Taylor spent the season with the Columbia Fireflies, going 1–9 with a 4.94 ERA over 85 2/3 innings. In 2018, Taylor split the season between the St. Lucie Mets and the Las Vegas 51s, going a combined 3–8 with a 5.40 ERA over 86 2/3 innings.

In 2019, Taylor split the season between St. Lucie, the Binghamton Rumble Ponies, and the Syracuse Mets, combining to go 2–3 with a 2.16 ERA over 66 2/3 innings. Following the 2019 season, Taylor played for the Scottsdale Scorpions of the Arizona Fall League. On November 4, 2019, Taylor was added to the Mets' 40-man roster.

=== Houston Astros ===
On December 5, 2019, Taylor and Kenedy Corona were traded to the Houston Astros in exchange for Jake Marisnick. On July 24, 2020, Taylor pitched a scoreless inning in his MLB debut against the Seattle Mariners. On August 17, he earned his first career save.

In 2020, he was 2–1 with one save and a 2.18 ERA in which he pitched 20 2/3 innings over 22 relief appearances. In 2021, he was 4–4 with a 3.16 ERA. In 50 relief appearances, he pitched 42 2/3 innings.

On June 4, 2022, the Astros placed Taylor on the 15-day injured list due to left elbow discomfort and transferred him to the 60-day injured list on July 1, 2022. The Astros activated Taylor on September 13, and assigned him to the Triple-A Sugar Land Space Cowboys of the Pacific Coast League. On the season, he pitched in 19 games for Houston and logged a 3.94 ERA with 9 strikeouts in 16.0 innings of work.

On January 13, 2023, Taylor avoided arbitration with the Astros, agreeing to a one-year, $830K contract for the season. After beginning the year in Triple–A, Taylor was designated for assignment by Houston following the waiver claim of Jake Cousins on July 31. On August 4, he was released by the Astros organization.

=== Texas Rangers ===
On January 25, 2024, Taylor signed a minor league contract with the Texas Rangers. In 34 appearances for the Triple–A Round Rock Express, he compiled a 4–2 record and 5.80 ERA with 40 strikeouts over 40 1/3 innings of work. Taylor was released by the Rangers organization on August 27.

== International ==
In September 2016, Taylor was selected for Great Britain at the 2017 World Baseball Classic Qualification, qualifying via his British father.
