= Bill Murphy (baseball coach) =

American baseball coach (born 1989)

Pittsburgh Pirates – No. 51
- Pitching Coach
- Born: November 13, 1989 (age 36); Union City, New Jersey, U.S.
- Bats: Right Throws: Right

Teams
- As coach: Houston Astros (2021–2025); Pittsburgh Pirates (2026–present)

Career highlights and awards
- World Series champion (2022)

William Murphy (born November 13, 1989) is an American professional baseball pitching coach for the Pittsburgh Pirates of Major League Baseball (MLB).

== Career ==
Murphy grew up in Cranford, New Jersey and attended Roselle Catholic High School in Roselle, New Jersey, where he pitched for the baseball team for three years. Murphy attended Rutgers University, where he was a relief pitcher for three seasons, before transferring to Wagner College, where he played first base for one season. He coached for Georgetown University and Brown University before he was hired by the Astros before the 2016 season.

In 2022, the Astros won 106 games, the second-highest total in franchise history. They advanced to the World Series and defeated the Philadelphia Phillies in six games to give Murphy his first career World Series title. Astros pitchers led the American League (AL) in earned run average (ERA, 2.90), and walks plus hits per inning pitched (WHIP, 1.092), while throwing two no-hitters, including one in Game 4 of the World Series.

On October 27, 2025, Murphy was hired to serve as the new pitching coach for the Pittsburgh Pirates.

Sporting positions
Preceded by Josh Miller	Houston Astros bullpen coach 2022—2025	Succeeded by Ethan Katz
