= 2020 Houston Astros season =

59th season in Major League Baseball for the Houston Astros

2020 Houston Astros
- American League West 2nd Place
- League: American League
- Division: West
- Ballpark: Minute Maid Park
- City: Houston, Texas
- Record: 29–31 (.483)
- Divisional place: 2nd
- Owners: Jim Crane
- General managers: James Click
- Managers: Dusty Baker
- Television: AT&T SportsNet Southwest (Todd Kalas, Geoff Blum)
- Radio: KTRH 740 Weekday Night Games Sportstalk 790; Houston Astros Radio Network (Robert Ford, Steve Sparks, Geoff Blum); KLAT (Spanish) (Francisco Romero, Alex Treviño)
- Stats: ESPN.com; Baseball Reference

The 2020 Houston Astros season was the 59th season for the Major League Baseball (MLB) franchise in Houston, Texas, their 56th as the Astros, eighth in both the American League (AL) and AL West division, and 21st at Minute Maid Park. The team entered the season having won a franchise regular season-record 107 games, as both the defending champions of the American League and of the AL West, the runners-up of the 2019 World Series, with three consecutive 100-win regular seasons, and entrants into three consecutive American League Championship Series (ALCS); both of the latter two achievements had been unprecedented in franchise history.

The 2020 season was the first for both Dusty Baker as the Astros' manager, the 24th in franchise history, and James Click as general manager. The pair replaced A. J. Hinch and Jeff Luhnow, respectively, who were terminated for their role in the team's sign-stealing scandal which had been revealed during the 2019–20 offseason. As part of the team's punishment, they forfeited both their first- and second-round picks in the 2020 and 2021 MLB drafts.

As a response to the ongoing COVID-19 pandemic, the MLB season was shortened from the standard 162-game schedule to 60 games, resulting in a delayed start to the season. The season commenced on July 24 with Justin Verlander making his third consecutive Opening Day start for the Astros, who hosted the Seattle Mariners and won, 8–12. The Astros' top overall selection in the MLB draft was Alex Santos, a compensatory pick between the second and third rounds.

By virtue of a Los Angeles Angels loss on September 25, the Astros clinched a playoff berth, reaching their fourth consecutive postseason tournament, fifth in the last six years, and 14th postseason season appearance in franchise history. It was also their fourth wild card title and second as an AL club. Baker became the first major league manager to guide five different teams to the postseason. In spite of finishing the regular season 29–31, Houston became the second AL team to reach the playoffs with a losing record following the 1981 Kansas City Royals, also during a shortened season. Hence, under the newly-expanded playoff format, Houston received the No. 6 seed in the AL.

On September 30, the Astros became the first sub-.500 team to win a playoff series, eliminating the Minnesota Twins in a two-game sweep in the AL Wild Card Series (WCS), becoming the first sub-.500 team to win a playoff game the day before (as of 2023, they remain the only sub-.500 team to ever win a playoff game or series). The Astros advanced to the American League Division Series (ALDS), where they defeated the AL West-champion Oakland Athletics three games to one. During the ALDS, the Astros batted in a historic 33 runs (and 12 home runs) across 35 innings. Next, the Astros advanced to their fourth consecutive ALCS, where they were defeated by the Tampa Bay Rays in seven games. Having trailed three-games-to-none to start the ALCS, the Astros nearly completed a dramatic comeback in forcing a Game 7.

== Offseason ==
=== Summary ===
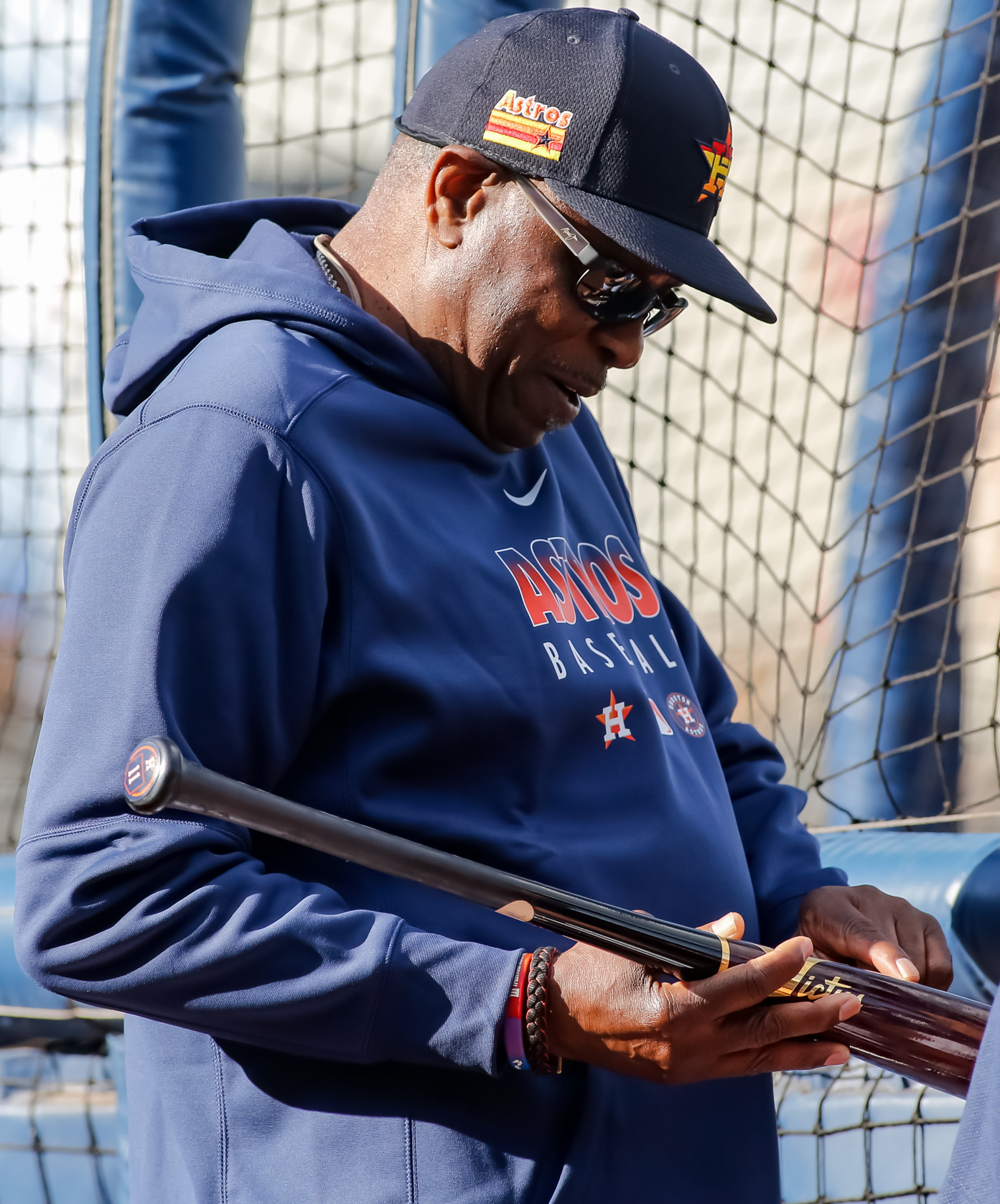
The Astros hired Dusty Baker as their 24th manager, succeeding A. J. Hinch.

The Astros concluded the 2019 season with an 107–55 (.660) record for the most wins in baseball and as AL West division champions, ten games ahead of the runners-up Oakland Athletics. The Astros won their second AL pennant, but were defeated in the World Series in seven games by the Washington Nationals. The 107 regular-season wins surpassed the club record of 103 set just the season before, with the Astros having won 100 or more games for a third consecutive, unprecedented in franchise history. Justin Verlander won the AL Cy Young Award, the second of his career and fourth by an Astros pitcher, while Yordan Alvarez was recognized as AL Rookie of the Year, the third player in team history.

==== Electronic sign-stealing controversy ====
For years, some individuals on other teams had suspected the Astros of stealing signs, but there was no public reporting on the subject until November 2019, when The Athletic reporters Ken Rosenthal and Evan Drellich at The Athletic published an article detailing the team's activities. Mike Fiers, who pitched for the Astros from 2015 to 2017, informed The Athletic that the organization used a video camera in center field at Minute Maid Park to film the opposing catcher's signals to the pitcher regarding the next pitch. Astros players or team staffers watching the live camera feed behind the dugout used various audio cues to signal to the batter what type of pitch was coming next. MLB opened an investigation into the allegations and confirmed in January 2020 that the Astros illegally used a camera system to steal signs during the 2017 regular season and postseason, during which they won the World Series, as well as in part of the 2018 regular season. MLB found no evidence of illicit sign stealing in the 2019 season, in which the Astros advanced to the World Series but lost.

For failure to prevent the rules violations, Astros general manager Jeff Luhnow and field manager A. J. Hinch were suspended for the entire 2020 season. The Astros were fined the maximum allowable $5 million and forfeited their first- and second-round picks in the 2020 and 2021 drafts. No players were punished because they had been given immunity by MLB in exchange for their cooperation. The Astros subsequently fired both Luhnow and Hinch on the day their suspensions were announced. MLB's investigation also determined that Boston Red Sox manager Alex Cora helped mastermind the Astros' sign stealing while serving as Hinch's bench coach in 2017; Boston and Cora mutually parted ways the following day, and MLB later suspended Cora through the 2020 postseason. Carlos Beltrán was the only Astros player from 2017 who was specifically named in the report; he had been hired to manage the New York Mets in November 2019 but parted ways with the team after the results of MLB's investigation were announced.

==== Impact of COVID-19 pandemic ====
On March 12, 2020, MLB announced that as a response to the ongoing COVID-19 pandemic, the start of the regular season would be delayed by at least two weeks in addition to the remainder of spring training being cancelled. Four days later, it was announced that the start of the season would be pushed back indefinitely due to the recommendation made by the CDC to restrict events of more than fifty people for eight weeks. On June 23, commissioner Rob Manfred unilaterally implemented a 60-game season. Players reported to training camps on July 1 in order to resume spring training and prepare for a July 24 Opening Day.

The 2020 All-Star Game was also canceled due to the delayed start.

=== Transactions ===
==== Coaching staff changes ====
- On December 7, 2019, first base coach Don Kelly departed for the position of bench coach with the Pittsburgh Pirates, joining the coaching staff of newly hired manager Derek Shelton. The first base coach position went to Omar Lopez, a long-time manager in the Astros' minor league system.
- On January 13, Astros owner Jim Crane fired Jeff Luhnow and A. J. Hinch, after both were implicated in MLB's investigation into the Houston Astros' sign stealing scandal. Crane temporarily assumed control of baseball operations while a search was ongoing for new personnel.
- On January 29, the Astros hired Dusty Baker as the new manager for the 2020 season with an option for 2021.

==== Releases and departures ====
- On December 18, 2019, the New York Yankees announced they had signed RHP Gerrit Cole to a 9-year contract, which was rumored to be worth $324 million, the fourth-richest contract in MLB history. Cole had elected free agency at the conclusion of the 2019 season, and had rejected a $17.8 million qualifying offer from the Astros to return for 2020.

==== Signings ====
- Astros signed C Dustin Garneau to a 1-year contract
- Astros re-signed RHP Joe Smith to a 2-year contract
- Astros re-signed C Martín Maldonado to a 2-year contract
- Astros signed RHP Jared Hughes to a minor league contract

== Regular season ==
=== Summary ===
==== July ====
Michael Brantley poises to take a swing.

Opening Day starting lineup
Uniform	Player	Position
4	George Springer	Center fielder
27	Jose Altuve	Second baseman
2	Alex Bregman	Third baseman
23	Michael Brantley	Left fielder
10	Yuli Gurriel	First baseman
1	Carlos Correa	Shortstop
22	Josh Reddick	Right fielder
16	Aledmys Díaz	Designated hitter
15	Martín Maldonado	Catcher
35	Justin Verlander	Pitcher
Venue: Minute Maid Park • Final: Houston 8, Seattle 2 Sources:

The Astros hosted the Seattle Mariners for Opening Day on July 24. Justin Verlander made his third consecutive Opening Day start for the Astros, while Marco Gonzales was his mound opponent. Kyle Lewis led off the top of the second inning with a home run of Verlander for the first Mariners' run of the game and season. In the bottom of the third inning, Josh Reddick led off with double for the Astros' first hit of the campaigh, and scored their first run on Martín Maldonado's run batted in (RBI)-single to left field. In the top of the fourth, Kyle Seager homered off Verlander, but this would be the extent of the Mariners' scoring. In the bottom of the fifth, Jose Altuve's infield single scored Aledmys Díaz. Alex Bregman then singled, and Michael Brantley connected for a three-run homer to score Altuve and Bregman. In the bottom of the sixth, Maldonado collected another RBI single to score Abraham Toro, and, the following inning, Carlos Correa doubled home Yuli Gurriel. The Astros won, 8 to 2, as Verlander worked six innings to earn the victory. Brantley's home run was his second consecutive on an Opening Day. The triumph extended a winning streak of a franchise-record eight successive Opening Days for Houston, which spanned until the inauguration of the 2022 campaign, also tying an all-Major League record.

After making the Opening Day start, Verlander stopped throwing as of July 24 due to a right forearm strain. On September 19, it was announced that Verlander would undergo Toomy John surgery and miss the remainder of the season, as well as 2021.

On July 27, Alex Bregman connected for the 100th home run of his career, a three-run shot off Kendall Graveman of the Seattle Mariners, giving Houston a 4–3 lead.

==== August ====
On August 23, Zack Greinke threw a 53.5 miles per hour (86.1 km/h) eephus pitch to Trent Grisham of the San Diego Padres, which was the slowest pitch thrown for a strike by a pitcher since Henderson Álvarez of the Philadelphia Phillies tossed a 52.5 miles per hour (84.5 km/h) eephus for a called strike against Ozzie Albies of the Atlanta Braves on September 23, 2017. The Padres defeated the Astros, 5–3, and swept the series.

After having appeared in just two games, on August 28, Yordan Alvarez underwent arthroscopic knee surgery, ending his season.

==== Performance overview ====
After the season, pitcher Cristian Javier was named a finalist for the 2020 AL Rookie of the Year Award, finishing third in voting.

=== Game log ===
2020 Game Log: 29–31 (Home: 20–8; Away: 9–23)
July: 4–3 (Home: 3–3; Away: 1–0)

#	Date	Opponent	Score	Win	Loss	Save	Stadium	Record
1	July 24	Mariners	8–2	**Verlander** (1–0)	Gonzales (0–1)	—	**Minute Maid Park**	1–0
2	July 25	Mariners	7–2	**McCullers Jr.** (1–0)	Walker (0–1)	—	**Minute Maid Park**	2–0
3	July 26	Mariners	6–7	Altavilla (1–0)	**Devenski** (0–1)	Williams (1)	**Minute Maid Park**	2–1
4	July 27	Mariners	8–5	**Bielak** (1–0)	Graveman (0–1)	**Osuna** (1)	**Minute Maid Park**	3–1
5	July 28	Dodgers	2–5	Graterol (1–1)	**Valdez** (0–1)	Jansen (1)	**Minute Maid Park**	3–2
6	July 29	Dodgers	2–4 (13)	Santana (1–0)	**Sneed** (0–1)	—	**Minute Maid Park**	3–3
7	July 31	@ Angels	9–6	**Bielak** (2–0)	Andriese (0–1)	**Scrubb** (1)	Angel Stadium	4–3

August: 15–11 (Home: 11–2; Away: 4–9)

#	Date	Opponent	Score	Win	Loss	Save	Stadium	Record
8	August 1	@ Angels	4–5 (10)	Buchter (2–0)	**Rodríguez** (0–1)	—	Angel Stadium	4–4
9	August 2	@ Angels	6–5 (11)	**Taylor** (1–0)	Barnes (0–2)	—	Angel Stadium	5–4
10	August 4	@ Diamondbacks	8–2	**Javier** (1–0)	Bumgarner (0–2)	—	Chase Field	6–4
11	August 5	@ Diamondbacks	7–14	Ray (1–2)	**McCullers Jr.** (1–1)	—	Chase Field	6–5
12	August 6	@ Diamondbacks	4–5	Guerra (1–0)	**Pressly** (0–1)	—	Chase Field	6–6
13	August 7	@ Athletics	2–3 (13)	Wendelken (1–0)	**Sneed** (0–2)	—	Oakland Coliseum	6–7
14	August 8	@ Athletics	1–3	Montas (2–1)	**Valdez** (0–2)	Hendriks (5)	Oakland Coliseum	6–8
15	August 9	@ Athletics	2–7	Luzardo (1–0)	**Javier** (1–1)	Smith (1)	Oakland Coliseum	6–9
16	August 10	Giants	6–4	**McCullers Jr.** (2–1)	Webb (1–1)	**Pressly** (1)	**Minute Maid Park**	7–9
17	August 11	Giants	6–7 (10)	Gott (1–0)	**Sneed** (0–3)	Rogers (1)	**Minute Maid Park**	7–10
18	August 12	Giants	5–1	**Greinke** (1–0)	Baragar (2–1)	—	**Minute Maid Park**	8–10
19	August 14	Mariners	11–1	**Valdez** (1–2)	Cortés Jr. (0–1)	—	**Minute Maid Park**	9–10
20	August 15	Mariners	2–1	**Javier** (2–1)	Margevicius (0–1)	**Pressly** (2)	**Minute Maid Park**	10–10
21	August 16	Mariners	3–2	**Pressly** (1–1)	Swanson (0–2)	—	**Minute Maid Park**	11–10
22	August 17	Rockies	2–1	**Bielak** (3–0)	Freeland (2–1)	**Taylor** (1)	**Minute Maid Park**	12–10
23	August 18	Rockies	2–1 (11)	**Scrubb** (1–0)	Díaz (0–1)	—	**Minute Maid Park**	13–10
24	August 19	@ Rockies	13–6	**Valdez** (2–2)	Castellani (0–1)	—	Coors Field	14–10
25	August 20	@ Rockies	10–8	**Raley** (1–0)	Márquez (2–4)	**Pressly** (3)	Coors Field	15–10
26	August 21	@ Padres	3–4	Guerra (1–0)	**McCullers Jr.** (2–2)	Pagán (1)	Petco Park	15–11
27	August 22	@ Padres	2–13	Davies (4–2)	**Bielak** (3–1)	—	Petco Park	15–12
28	August 23	@ Padres	3–5	Stammen (3–1)	**Paredes** (0–1)	Pagán (2)	Petco Park	15–13
29	August 24	Angels	11–4	**Valdez** (3–2)	Sandoval (0–4)	—	**Minute Maid Park**	16–13
30	August 25 (1)	Angels	6–3 (7)	**Javier** (3–1)	Suárez (0–2)	**Pressly** (4)	**Minute Maid Park**	17–13
31	August 25 (2)	Angels	5–12 (7)	Peña (2–0)	**Bielak** (3–2)	—	**Minute Maid Park**	17–14
—	August 26	Angels	Postponed (Hurricane Laura); Makeup: September 5					
—	August 28	Athletics	Postponed (strikes due to shooting of Jacob Blake); Makeup: August 29					
32	August 29 (1)	Athletics	4–2 (7)	**McCullers Jr.** (3–2)	Bassitt (2–2)	**Pressly** (5)	**Minute Maid Park**	18–14
33	August 29 (2)	Athletics	6–3 (7)	**Greinke** (2–0)	Montas (2–3)	**Pressly** (6)	**Minute Maid Park**	19–14
—	August 30	Athletics	Postponed (COVID-19); Makeup: September 8					

September: 10–17 (Home: 6–5; Away: 4–12)

#	Date	Opponent	Score	Win	Loss	Save	Stadium	Record
34	September 1	Rangers	5–6 (10)	Hernández (5–0)	**Taylor** (1–1)	Montero (7)	**Minute Maid Park**	19–15
35	September 2	Rangers	2–1	**Javier** (4–1)	Allard (0–4)	**Pressly** (7)	**Minute Maid Park**	20–15
36	September 3	Rangers	8–4	**Greinke** (3–0)	Lynn (4–2)	—	**Minute Maid Park**	21–15
37	September 4	@ Angels	5–6 (11)	Andriese (2–2)	**Raley** (0–1)	—	Angel Stadium	21–16
38	September 5 (1)	@ Angels	9–10 (7)	Peña (3–0)	**Paredes** (1–2)	—	Angel Stadium	21–17
39	September 5 (2)	Angels	6–7 (7)	Ramirez (1–0)	**Castellanos** (0–1)	Buttrey (5)	Angel Stadium	21–18
40	September 6	@ Angels	5–9	Mayers (1–0)	**Valdez** (3–3)	—	Angel Stadium	21–19
41	September 7	@ Athletics	0–6	Bassitt (3–2)	**Javier** (4–2)	—	Oakland Coliseum	21–20
42	September 8 (1)	Athletics	2–4 (7)	Montas (3–3)	**Greinke** (3–1)	Hendriks (11)	Oakland Coliseum	21–21
43	September 8 (2)	@ Athletics	5–4 (7)	**Paredes** (2–2)	Wendelken (1–1)	**Pressly** (8)	Oakland Coliseum	22–21
44	September 9	@ Athletics	2–3	Hendriks (3–0)	**Pressly** (1–2)	—	Oakland Coliseum	22–22
45	September 10	@ Athletics	1–3	Manaea (4–2)	**Urquidy** (0–1)	Hendriks (12)	Oakland Coliseum	22–23
46	September 12	@ Dodgers	7–5	**James** (1–0)	Jansen (3–1)	**Pressly** (9)	Dodger Stadium	23–23
47	September 13	@ Dodgers	1–8	González (3–0)	**Greinke** (3–2)	—	Dodger Stadium	23–24
48	September 15	Rangers	4–1	**Urquidy** (1–1)	Goody (0–1)	**Pressly** (10)	**Minute Maid Park**	24–24
49	September 16	Rangers	0–1	Gibson (2–5)	**Pressly** (1–3)	—	**Minute Maid Park**	24–25
50	September 17	Rangers	2–1	**Valdez** (4–3)	Lyles (1–5)	**Raley** (1)	**Minute Maid Park**	25–25
51	September 18	Diamondbacks	3–6	Gallen (2–2)	**García** (0–1)	Crichton (4)	**Minute Maid Park**	25–26
52	September 19	Diamondbacks	3–2	**Paredes** (3–2)	Weaver (1–8)	**Pressly** (11)	**Minute Maid Park**	26–26
53	September 20	Diamondbacks	3–2	**Taylor** (2–1)	Guerra (1–2)	**Pressly** (12)	**Minute Maid Park**	27–26
54	September 21	@ Mariners	1–6	Gonzales (7–2)	**McCullers Jr.** (3–3)	—	T-Mobile Park	27–27
55	September 22	@ Mariners	6–1	**Valdez** (5–3)	Sadler (1–2)	—	T-Mobile Park	28–27
56	September 23	@ Mariners	2–3	Margevicius (2–3)	**Greinke** (3–3)	Hirano (4)	T-Mobile Park	28–28
57	September 24	@ Rangers	12–4	**Javier** (5–2)	Lynn (6–3)	—	Globe Life Field	29–28
58	September 25	@ Rangers	4–5 (10)	Martin (1–1)	**Paredes** (3–3)	—	Globe Life Field	29–29
59	September 26	@ Rangers	1–6	Herget (1–0)	**Bielak** (3–3)	—	Globe Life Field	29–30
60	September 27	@ Rangers	4–8	Benjamin (2–1)	**De Jong** (0–1)	—	Globe Life Field	29–31

Legend: = Win = Loss = Postponement
Bold = Astros team member

=== League standings ===
AL West
Team	W	L	Pct.	GB	Home	Road
Oakland Athletics	36	24	.600	—	22‍–‍10	14‍–‍14
Houston Astros	29	31	.483	7	20‍–‍9	9‍–‍22
Seattle Mariners	27	33	.450	9	14‍–‍10	13‍–‍23
Los Angeles Angels	26	34	.433	10	16‍–‍15	10‍–‍19
Texas Rangers	22	38	.367	14	16‍–‍14	6‍–‍24

==== American League Wild Card ====
AL Wild Card standings

Division leaders
Team	W	L	Pct.
Tampa Bay Rays	40	20	.667
Oakland Athletics	36	24	.600
Minnesota Twins	36	24	.600

Division 2nd place
Team	W	L	Pct.
Cleveland Indians	35	25	.583
New York Yankees	33	27	.550
Houston Astros	29	31	.483

Wild Card teams (Top 2 teams qualify for postseason)
Team	W	L	Pct.	GB
Chicago White Sox	35	25	.583	+3
Toronto Blue Jays	32	28	.533	—
Seattle Mariners	27	33	.450	5
Los Angeles Angels	26	34	.433	6
Kansas City Royals	26	34	.433	6
Baltimore Orioles	25	35	.417	7
Boston Red Sox	24	36	.400	8
Detroit Tigers	23	35	.397	8
Texas Rangers	22	38	.367	10

==== Record versus opponents ====
American League

2020 American League record Source: MLB Standings Grid – 2020
Team	**HOU**	**LAA**	**OAK**	**SEA**	**TEX**	NL
Houston	—	4–6	3–7	7–3	5–5	10–10
Los Angeles	6–4	—	4–6	5–5	4–6	7–13
Oakland	7–3	6–4	—	6–4	7–3	10–10
Seattle	3–7	5–5	4–6	—	8–2	7–13
Texas	5–5	6–4	3–7	2–8	—	6–14

== Roster ==
2020 Houston Astros
Roster
Pitchers: 66 Bryan Abreu; 63 Brandon Bailey; 29 Joe Biagini; 64 Brandon Bielak; 72 Humberto Castellanos; 0,69 Chase De Jong; 47 Chris Devenski; 77 Luis Garcia; 21 Zack Greinke; 39 Josh James; 53 Cristian Javier; 43 Lance McCullers Jr.; 54 Roberto Osuna; 60 Enoli Paredes; 41 Brad Peacock; 52 Cionel Pérez; 55 Ryan Pressly; 58 Brooks Raley; 68 Nivaldo Rodríguez; 71 Carlos Sanabria; 70 Andre Scrubb; 67 Cy Sneed; 62 Blake Taylor; 65 José Urquidy; 59 Framber Valdez; 35 Justin Verlander	Catchers: 13 Dustin Garneau; 15 Martín Maldonado; 11 Garrett Stubbs; Infielders: 27 Jose Altuve; 2 Alex Bregman; 1 Carlos Correa; 16 Aledmys Díaz; 10 Yuli Gurriel; 28 Taylor Jones; 9 Jack Mayfield; 31 Abraham Toro	Outfielders: 23 Michael Brantley; 22 Josh Reddick; 4 George Springer; 3 Myles Straw; 30 Kyle Tucker; Other batters: 44 Yordan Alvarez	Manager: 12 Dusty Baker; Coaches: 85 Javier Bracamonte (bullpen catcher); 37 Alex Cintrón (hitting); 17 Michael Collins (catching); 19 Joe Espada (bench); 18 Omar López (first base); 48 Josh Miller (bullpen); 8 Gary Pettis (third base); 46 Troy Snitker (hitting); 36 Chris Speier (quality control); 56 Brent Strom (pitching)

== Player statistics ==
Table legend
League leader (Bold: MLB leader)
League top ten
Team leader

=== Batting ===
Note: G = Games played; AB = At bats; R = Runs; H = Hits; 2B = Doubles; 3B = Triples; HR = Home runs; RBI = Runs batted in; SB = Stolen bases; BB = Walks; AVG = Batting average; SLG = Slugging average

Regular season batting results
Player	G	AB	R	H	2B	3B	HR	RBI	SB	BB	AVG	SLG
Yuli Gurriel	57	211	27	49	12	1	6	22	0	12	.232	.384
Kyle Tucker	58	209	33	56	12	**6**	9	42	8	18	.268	.512
Carlos Correa	58	201	22	53	9	0	5	25	0	16	.264	.383
Jose Altuve	48	192	32	42	9	0	5	18	2	17	.219	.344
George Springer	51	189	37	50	6	2	14	32	1	24	.265	.540
Josh Reddick	56	188	22	46	11	1	4	23	1	20	.245	.378
Michael Brantley	46	170	24	51	15	0	5	22	2	17	.300	.476
Alex Bregman	42	153	19	37	12	1	6	22	0	24	.242	.451
Martín Maldonado	47	135	19	29	4	0	6	24	1	27	.215	.378
Abraham Toro	33	87	13	13	2	0	3	9	1	3	.149	.276
Myles Straw	33	82	8	17	4	0	0	8	6	4	.207	.256
Aledmys Díaz	17	58	8	14	5	0	3	6	0	1	.241	.483
Jack Mayfield	21	42	5	8	1	0	0	3	0	2	.190	.214
Dustin Garneau	17	38	4	6	0	1	1	4	0	6	.158	.289
Taylor Jones	7	21	3	4	1	0	1	3	0	1	.190	.381
Garrett Stubbs	14	8	1	1	0	0	0	1	0	0	.125	.125
Yordan Alvarez	2	8	2	2	0	0	1	4	0	0	.250	.625
**Team totals**	**60**	**1992**	**279**	**478**	**103**	**12**	**69**	**268**	**22**	**192**	**.240**	**.408**

=== Pitching ===
Note: W = Wins; L = Losses; ERA = Earned run average; G = Games pitched; GS = Games started; SV = Saves; IP = Innings pitched; H = Hits allowed; R = Runs allowed; ER = Earned runs allowed; BB = Walks allowed; SO = Strikeouts

Regular season pitching results
Player	W	L	ERA	G	GS	SV	IP	H	R	ER	BB	SO
Framber Valdez	5	3	3.57	11	10	0	70.2	63	32	28	16	76
Zack Greinke	3	3	4.03	12	12	0	67.0	67	30	30	9	67
Lance McCullers Jr.	3	3	3.93	11	11	0	55.0	44	29	24	20	56
Cristian Javier	5	2	3.48	12	10	0	54.1	36	21	21	18	54
Brandon Bielak	3	3	6.75	12	6	0	32.0	39	26	24	17	26
José Urquidy	1	1	2.73	5	5	0	29.2	22	9	9	8	17
Andre Scrubb	1	0	1.90	20	0	1	23.2	15	5	5	20	24
Ryan Pressly	1	3	3.43	23	0	12	21.0	21	10	8	7	29
Blake Taylor	2	1	2.18	22	0	1	20.2	13	7	5	12	17
Enoli Paredes	3	3	3.05	22	0	0	20.2	18	9	7	11	20
Cy Sneed	0	3	5.71	18	0	0	17.1	22	15	11	10	21
Josh James	1	0	7.27	13	2	0	17.1	15	14	14	17	21
Brooks Raley	0	1	3.94	17	0	1	16.0	8	8	7	4	21
Luis García	0	1	2.92	5	1	0	12.1	7	4	4	5	9
Humberto Castellanos	0	1	6.75	8	0	0	10.2	12	8	8	5	12
Nivaldo Rodríguez	0	1	6.23	5	0	0	8.2	15	7	6	6	8
Brandon Bailey	0	0	2.45	5	0	0	7.1	6	2	2	3	4
Chase De Jong	0	1	14.73	3	2	0	7.1	12	12	12	4	9
Cionel Pérez	0	0	2.84	7	0	0	6.1	7	2	2	6	8
Justin Verlander	1	0	3.00	1	1	0	6.0	3	2	2	1	7
Joe Biagini	0	0	20.77	4	0	0	4.1	10	10	10	4	4
Roberto Osuna	0	0	2.08	4	0	1	4.1	3	1	1	0	3
Chris Devenski	0	1	14.73	4	0	0	3.2	7	6	6	3	5
Bryan Abreu	0	0	2.70	4	0	0	3.1	1	2	1	7	3
Brad Peacock	0	0	7.71	3	0	0	2.1	3	2	2	1	3
Carlos Sanabria	0	0	9.00	2	0	0	2.0	3	2	2	3	2
**Team totals**	**29**	**31**	**4.31**	**60**	**60**	**16**	**524.0**	**472**	**275**	**251**	**217**	**526**

== Postseason ==
=== Game log ===
2020 Postseason Game Log: (8–5)
ALWCS vs Twins: (2–0)

#	Date	Opponent	Score	Win	Loss	Save	Stadium	Record
1	September 29	@ Twins	4–1	Valdez (1–0)	Romo (0–1)	—	Target Field	1–0
2	September 30	@ Twins	3–1	Javier (1–0)	Stashak (0–1)	Pressly (1)	Target Field	2–0

ALDS vs Athletics: (3–1)

#	Date	Opponent	Score	Win	Loss	Save	Stadium	Record
1	October 5	@ Athletics	10–5	Taylor (1–0)	Wendelken (0–1)	—	Dodger Stadium	1–0
2	October 6	@ Athletics	5–2	Valdez (1–0)	Manaea (0–1)	Pressly (1)	Dodger Stadium	2–0
3	October 7	Athletics	7–9	Hendriks (1–0)	Raley (0–1)	—	Dodger Stadium	2–1
4	October 8	Athletics	11–6	Javier (1–0)	Montas (0–1)	—	Dodger Stadium	3–1
all games played at Dodger Stadium in Los Angeles, CA

ALCS vs Rays: (3–4)

#	Date	Opponent	Score	Win	Loss	Save	Stadium	Record
1	October 11	@ Rays	1–2	Snell (1–0)	Valdez (0–1)	Castillo (1)	Petco Park	0–1
2	October 12	@ Rays	2–4	Morton (1–0)	McCullers Jr. (0–1)	Anderson (1)	Petco Park	0–2
3	October 13	Rays	2–5	Yarbrough (1–0)	Urquidy (0–1)	Castillo (2)	Petco Park	0–3
4	October 14	Rays	4–3	Greinke (1–0)	Glasnow (0–1)	Pressly (1)	Petco Park	1–3
5	October 15	Rays	4–3	Pressly (1–0)	Anderson (0–1)	—	Petco Park	2–3
6	October 16	@ Rays	7–4	Valdez (1–1)	Snell (1–1)	Pressly (2)	Petco Park	3–3
7	October 17	@ Rays	2–4	Morton (2–0)	McCullers Jr. (0–2)	Fairbanks (1)	Petco Park	3–4
all games played at Petco Park in San Diego, CA

ALWCS

=== Wild Card Series ===
The Astros played the Twins in the Wild Card series at Target Field in Minneapolis, Minnesota.

Game 1, September 29 at Target Field

Zack Greinke got the ball for the Astros against Twins ace Kenta Maeda. Greinke pitched four innings, allowing 1 run. Framber Valdez relieved Greinke in the 5th inning, and pitched 5 scoreless innings. Meanwhile, George Springer tied the game with an RBI single, and the Astros scored 3 runs in the 9th off Sergio Romo & Caleb Thielbar.

Game 2, September 30 at Target Field

José Urquidy got the ball for the Astros against José Berríos. Urquidy pitched 4 1/3 innings, allowing 1 run, and was relieved by lefty Brooks Raley. Twins DH Nelson Cruz was the only source of offense for the Twins, as he drove in both runs for the Twins in the series. Cristian Javier pitched 3 scoreless innings, while Carlos Correa provided a go-ahead home run and the Astros got a 2 run single from breakout star Kyle Tucker. Pressly closed it out in the 9th inning to send the Astros to the ALDS.

ALDS

=== American League Division Series ===
The Astros faced their division rivals, the Oakland Athletics, in the ALDS. Due to the continuing COVID-19 pandemic, all games of the series were played at Dodger Stadium in Los Angeles.

Game 1, October 5 at Dodger Stadium

The Astros announced that Lance McCullers Jr. would get the ball for game one against A's ace Chris Bassitt. A's DH Khris Davis got the scoring started with a two-run home run in the second inning, followed by a Sean Murphy solo shot in the third. The Astros responded with a solo home run from Alex Bregman and a game-tying home run from Carlos Correa in the top of the fourth. The A's responded quickly with a solo shot from Matt Olson to put the A's back in front, 4–3. Both starters lasted four innings. A Mark Canha sacrifice fly extended the A's lead to 5–3 in the fifth. The Astros took the lead in the sixth, when Josh Reddick reached on a fielding error with two outs and Martín Maldonado singled. George Springer then doubled to score Reddick Jose Altuve followed it up with a double to drive in both Maldonado and Springer giving the Astros a 6–5 lead. Michael Brantley singled in Altuve to make it 7–5. Correa hit his second home run of the game in the seventh to make it 8–5. The Astros then broke it open in the ninth inning with a Correa RBI single and a Yuli Gurriel sacrifice fly. Ryan Pressly worked a 1–2–3 ninth inning to seal the Game 1 victory for the Astros 10–5.

Game 2, October 6 at Dodger Stadium

Left-handed pitcher Framber Valdez started game two of the series against A's left hander Sean Manaea. A's DH Khris Davis hit another home run to give the A's the lead in the second inning. The Astros fought back and took the lead when George Springer hit a two-run home run in the third. The Astros added another run on a Correa RBI groundout in the fourth moving the lead to 3–1. The A's countered with a Chad Pinder solo home run in the fourth to narrow the lead to 3–2. Martín Maldonado and Springer hit back-to-back home runs in the fifth inning to push the Astro's lead to 5–2. Ryan Pressly picked up the save for the Astros as they moved the A's to the edge of elimination with a 2–0 game lead in the series.

Game 3, October 7 at Dodger Stadium

José Urquidy started Game 3 for Houston, while the A's started Jesús Luzardo. A's second baseman Tommy La Stella got the scoring started with a solo home run in the first inning. The Astros responded with a solo home run from Jose Altuve and a Correa RBI groundout to take the lead in the bottom of the first. The A's responded again with a solo home run from left fielder Mark Canha to tie the game at two. The A's took the lead in the fourth inning on a Matt Olson solo home run.. The A's would pushed the lead to two with a Marcus Semien solo shot in the fifth. However, Houston tied it in the bottom of the fifth inning with an Aledmys Díaz two-run home run. The Astros retook the lead later in the inning with a Michael Brantley RBI single, an Alex Bregman RBI double, and a Kyle Tucker RBI single. Trailing 7–4, the A's tied it in the top of the seventh on a Chad Pinder three-run home run. The A's added two more runs in the eighth inning to cap the scoring. A's closer Liam Hendriks pitched three scoreless innings to save the A's season and send the series to a Game 4.

Game 4, October 8 at Dodger Stadium

The A's started Frankie Montas while the Astros started Zack Greinke. A's outfielder Ramón Laureano got the scoring started with a three-run home run in the second. The Astros responded in the fourth inning with a two-run home run from Michael Brantley and a three-run home run by Carlos Correa. Trailing 5–3, the A's pulled within one on another home run from Laureano that chased Greinke from the game. Lefty Blake Taylor came in and got the final out of the fifth inning. In the bottom of the fifth, Brantley hit his second home run of the game and Correa added an RBI single to make it 7–4. In the sixth, Kyle Tucker added an RBI single followed by another run-scoring single by Correa that to move the lead to 9–4. Jose Altuve added a two-run home run in the seventh to make it 11–4 Astros. The A's attempted to mount a comeback in the ninth when Marcus Semien drove in a run on a single and Tommy La Stella singled in Semien before Astros closer Ryan Pressly shut the door in the ninth to send the Astros to the ALCS.

ALCS

=== American League Championship Series ===
The Astros faced the No. 1-seeded Tampa Bay Rays in the ALCS. Due to the continuing COVID-19 pandemic, all games of the best-of-seven series were played at Petco Park in San Diego, California.

Game 1, October 11 at Petco Park

The Astros started left-hander Framber Valdez, while the Rays started to left-hander Blake Snell in game one of the series The Astros got the scoring started with a solo home run from Jose Altuve in the first inning. The Rays tied it on a solo home run from Randy Arozarena in the fourth inning and took the lead in the fifth inning on a Mike Zunino RBI single. Blake Snell pitched five innings and allowed only one run. Valdez pitched six innings, giving up two runs on four hits. The Rays' bullpen pitched four scoreless innings in relief as the Rays held on for the 2–1 victory. The win gave the Rays a 1–0 lead in the series.

Game 2, October 12 at Petco Park

The Astros started right hander Lance McCullers Jr., while the Rays started right hander Charlie Morton. The Rays got the scoring started with a 3-run home run from outfielder Manuel Margot. The Astros got on the board with a solo home run from shortstop Carlos Correa. The Rays added 1 more run from catcher Mike Zunino. The Astros started a rally in the 9th against Rays closer Nick Anderson, but only managed 1 run as the Astros fell into a 0–2 hole in the ALCS.

Game 3, October 13 at Petco Park

The Rays started left-hander Ryan Yarbrough, while the Astros started right-hander José Urquidy in Game 3 of the series with the Astros becoming the home team. The Astros took another early lead on a Jose Altuve home run in the first. Still leading by one in the sixth, the Rays pushed across six runs on a two-run scoring single by Joey Wendle. A hit batter drove in another run and a double with the bases loaded by Hunter Renfroe gave the Rays a 5–1 lead. A Michael Brantley home run in the sixth pulled the Astros within three, but they could must no further as they lost their third straight game. The loss moved the Astros to the edge of elimination in a 3–0 series hole.

Game 4, October 14 at Petco Park

The Rays started right hander Tyler Glasnow, while the Astros countered with Zack Greinke. The Astros took an early lead with another first inning home run from Jose Altuve and then added another run on an Altuve RBI double in the third. The Rays tied it at two in the fourth inning on an Randy Arozarena home run. George Springer hit a go-ahead two-run home run in the bottom of the fifth. The Rays drew within a run on a Willy Adames run-scoring double in the top of the ninth. Ryan Pressly was able to get the final out and move the series to Game 5 with the Astros trailing three-games-to-one.

Game 5, October 15 at Petco Park

The Rays started Game 5 with an opener in right-hander John Curtiss, while the Astros started rookie right-hander Luis García. The Astros, in their last game as the home team in the series, got the scoring started with a leadoff home run in the bottom of the first from George Springer. The Rays tied it on a Brandon Lowe solo homer in the third. However, the Astros answered and took the lead in the bottom of the third with a two-run single from Michael Brantley. The Rays narrowed the lead to one with another home run from Randy Arozarena in the fifth. With only six outs remaining in the game, the Rays tied it in the top of the eighth on a Ji-man Choi solo home run. With the game still tied in the bottom of the ninth inning, Carlos Correa homered to straight away center field to give the Astros the 4–3 win and extend the series to a Game 6.

Game 6, October 16 at Petco Park

Game 1 starter Framber Valdez started Game 6, while Blake Snell opposed him. The Rays got the scoring started with a Willy Adames RBI double. The Astros took the lead with a George Springer 2-run single, a Jose Altuve RBI double, and a Carlos Correa RBI single. Kyle Tucker added his first career postseason home run to make it a 5-1 Astros lead. The Astros took a 7–1 lead with a Michael Brantley RBI single & a Tucker sac fly. The Rays got back into the game with 2 home runs from Manuel Margot. Pressly shut the door in the 9th to force a Game 7 and make the Astros the 2nd team in MLB history to force a Game 7 after being down 3–0 in the series (The 2004 Red Sox are the other team).

Game 7, October 17 at Petco Park

The Astros started Game 2 starter Lance McCullers Jr., while the Rays started Game 2 starter Charlie Morton. The Rays struck first on a 2-run home run from Randy Arozarena in the 1st. Catcher Mike Zunino added a solo home run to make 3-0 Rays in the 2nd. Zunino then added a sac fly in the 6th to make it 4–0. The Astros got on the board with a 2-run single from Carlos Correa. Pete Fairbanks shut the door in the 9th to send the Rays to the World Series and eliminate the Astros.

=== Postseason rosters ===
Playoff rosters
American League Wild Card Series

- Pitchers: 21 Zack Greinke 39 Josh James 43 Lance McCullers Jr. 53 Cristian Javier 55 Ryan Pressly 58 Brooks Raley 59 Framber Valdez 60 Enoli Paredes 62 Blake Taylor 65 José Urquidy 67 Cy Sneed 70 Andre Scrubb
- Catchers: 11 Garrett Stubbs 13 Dustin Garneau 15 Martín Maldonado
- Infielders: 1 Carlos Correa 2 Alex Bregman 9 Jack Mayfield 10 Yuli Gurriel 16 Aledmys Díaz 27 Jose Altuve 31 Abraham Toro
- Outfielders: 3 Myles Straw 4 George Springer 20 Chas McCormick 22 Josh Reddick 23 Michael Brantley 30 Kyle Tucker

American League Division Series

- Pitchers: 21 Zack Greinke 39 Josh James 43 Lance McCullers Jr. 53 Cristian Javier 55 Ryan Pressly 58 Brooks Raley 59 Framber Valdez 60 Enoli Paredes 62 Blake Taylor 65 José Urquidy 67 Cy Sneed 70 Andre Scrubb 77 Luis García
- Catchers: 11 Garrett Stubbs 13 Dustin Garneau 15 Martín Maldonado
- Infielders: 1 Carlos Correa 2 Alex Bregman 10 Yuli Gurriel 16 Aledmys Díaz 27 Jose Altuve 31 Abraham Toro
- Outfielders: 3 Myles Straw 4 George Springer 20 Chas McCormick 22 Josh Reddick 23 Michael Brantley 30 Kyle Tucker

American League Championship Series

- Pitchers: 21 Zack Greinke 39 Josh James 43 Lance McCullers Jr. 53 Cristian Javier 55 Ryan Pressly 58 Brooks Raley 59 Framber Valdez 60 Enoli Paredes 62 Blake Taylor 65 José Urquidy 67 Cy Sneed 69 Chase De Jong 70 Andre Scrubb 77 Luis García
- Catchers: 11 Garrett Stubbs 13 Dustin Garneau 15 Martín Maldonado
- Infielders: 1 Carlos Correa 2 Alex Bregman 10 Yuli Gurriel 16 Aledmys Díaz 27 Jose Altuve 31 Abraham Toro
- Outfielders: 3 Myles Straw 4 George Springer 22 Josh Reddick 23 Michael Brantley 30 Kyle Tucker

== Major League Baseball draft ==
Houston Astros 2020 MLB draft selections
Rd.	Slot	Draftee	Position	School	Origin	Signed	Notes	Bio
1	None						(Note: Forfeited per sanctions levied by league earlier in the season for electronic sign-stealing violations.)	
2	72	Alex Santos II	Right-handed pitcher	Mount Saint Michael Academy	(New York (state))	Y	(Note: Compensatory pick for the New York Yankees signing Gerrit Cole.)	
3	101	Tyler Brown	Right-handed pitcher	Vanderbilt • 2020	(Ohio)	Y		
4	131	Zach Daniels	Outfielder	Tennessee	(Georgia (U.S. state))	Y		
5	160	Shay Whitcomb	Shortstop	San Diego	(California)	Y	(Note: MLB debut on August 17, 2024, with Houston)	

== Awards and achievements ==
=== Awards ===
2020 Houston Astros award winners
Name of award		Recipient	Ref.
Darryl Kile Good Guy Award		Brad Peacock	
Fred Hartman Award for Long and Meritorious Service to Baseball		Carl Schneider	
Houston Astros	Most Valuable Player (MVP)	George Springer	
Houston Astros	Pitcher of the Year	Framber Valdez	
Houston Astros	Rookie of the Year	Cristian Javier	

Other awards results

Name of award	Voting recipient(s) (Team)	Ref.
AL Cy Young Award	1st—Bieber (CLE) • 11th—Valdez (HOU)	
AL Most Valuable Player	1st—J. Abreu (CHW) • 13th—Springer (HOU)	
AL Manager of the Year	1st—Cash (TBR) • 6th—Baker (HOU)	
AL Rookie of the Year	1st—Lewis (SEA) • 3rd—Javier (HOU)	
Roberto Clemente	Winner—Wainwright (STL) • Nominee—Bregman (HOU)	

=== League leaders ===
AL batting leaders

- Triples; Kyle Tucker (6)

=== Other ===
2020 grand slams
No.	Date	Astros batter	Venue	Inning	Pitcher	Opposing team	Box
None (Note: The Astros' first season without a grand slam since 1993.)

== Minor league system ==
Level	Team	League	Manager
AAA	Round Rock Express	Pacific Coast League	
AA	Corpus Christi Hooks	Texas League	
A-Advanced	Fayetteville Woodpeckers	Carolina League	
A	Quad Cities River Bandits	Midwest League	
A-Short Season	Tri-City ValleyCats	New York–Penn League	
Rookie	GCL Astros	Gulf Coast League	
Rookie	DSL Astros	Dominican Summer League	

== Charitable efforts during Coronavirus pandemic ==
As of mid-April 2020, Astro teammates Carlos Correa and Martin Maldonado, along with fellow Major Leaguers such as Francisco Lindor and Eddie Rosario, as well as musical stars, have already shipped 26 pallets of medical supplies to the U.S. territory of Puerto Rico. Astros owner Jim Crane has waived all shipping and logistic charges through his company Crane Worldwide Logistics.

== See also ==
- List of Major League Baseball annual triples leaders
- List of Major League Baseball franchise postseason streaks
- List of Major League Baseball postseason sweeps
