= Brandon Bielak =

American baseball player (born 1996)

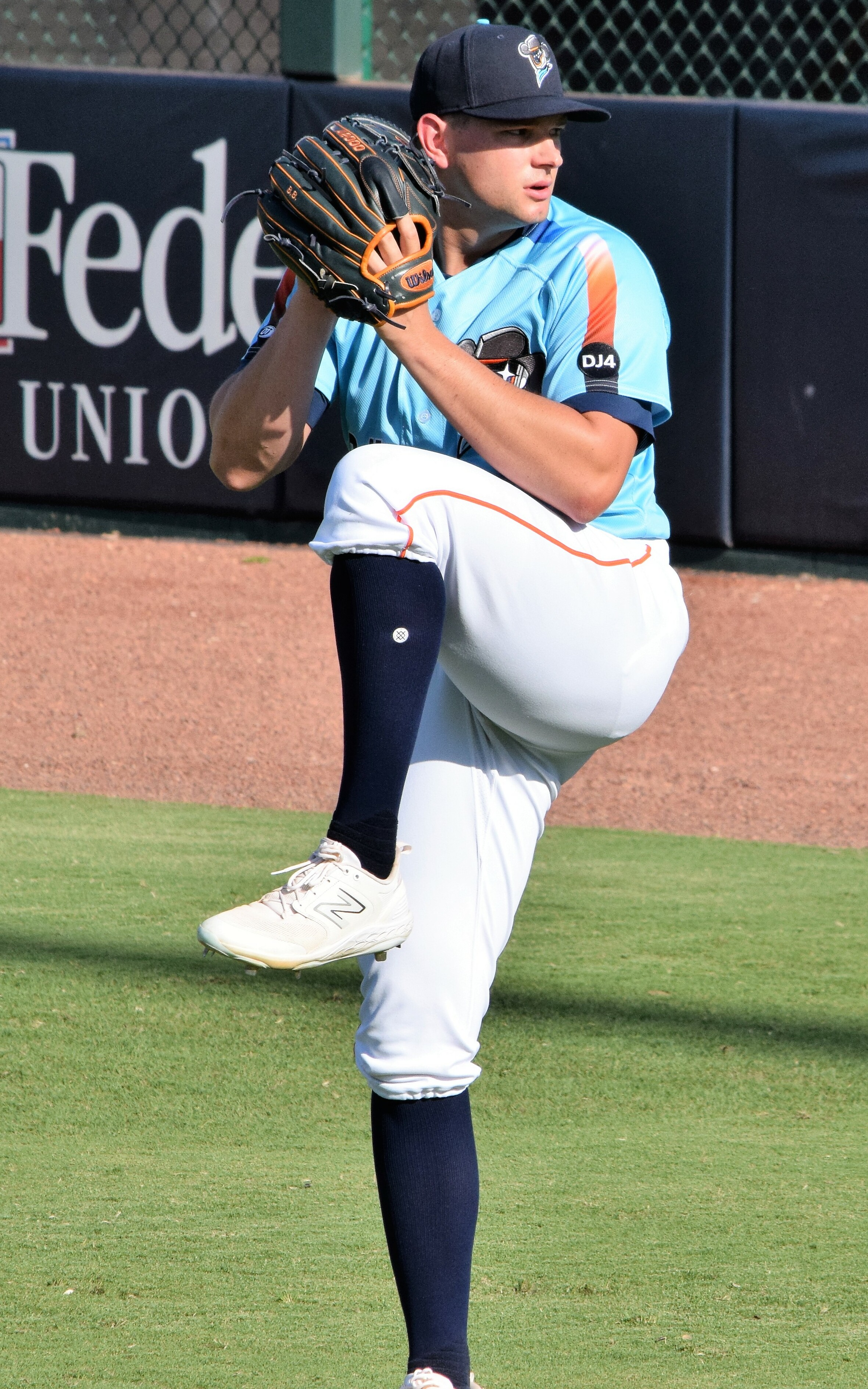
- Bielak with the Sugar Land Space Cowboys in 2023

Free agent
- Pitcher
- Born: April 2, 1996 (age 30); Edison, New Jersey, U.S.
- Bats: Left Throws: Right

MLB debut
- July 27, 2020, for the Houston Astros

MLB statistics (through 2024 season)
- Win–loss record: 12–13
- Earned run average: 4.63
- Strikeouts: 160
- Stats at Baseball Reference

Teams
- Houston Astros (2020–2024); Oakland Athletics (2024)

Brandon Michael Bielak (born April 2, 1996) is an American professional baseball pitcher who is a free agent. He has previously played in Major League Baseball (MLB) for the Oakland Athletics. Bielak played college baseball at the University of Notre Dame. He was selected by the Astros in the 11th round of the 2017 MLB draft, and made his MLB debut in 2020.

== Amateur career ==
Raised in Sayreville, New Jersey, Bielak attended and played baseball at St. Joseph High School in Metuchen, New Jersey. In 2014, as a senior, he pitched to an 8–1 record with a 0.58 ERA, striking out 87 batters in 60.2 innings pitched.

Undrafted out of high school in the 2014 MLB draft, Bielak enrolled at the University of Notre Dame where he played college baseball for the Fighting Irish. In 2015, as a freshman, he was 6–3 with a 3.55 ERA in 17 games (14 starts), in 2016, as a sophomore, he compiled a 3–2 record and a 2.10 ERA in 15 games (four starts). Following his sophomore season, he played collegiate summer baseball with the Orleans Firebirds of the Cape Cod Baseball League, and was named a league all-star. In 2017, as a junior, he was 2–6 with a 5.55 ERA in 15 games (14 starts).

== Professional career ==
=== Houston Astros ===
After his junior year, Bielak was selected by the Houston Astros in the 11th round of the 2017 MLB draft. He signed with Houston and made his professional debut with the Gulf Coast League Astros. After two scoreless appearances, he was promoted to the Tri-City ValleyCats where he finished the season with a 1–1 record and a 0.92 ERA in eight games (four starts). In 2018, Bielak began the season with the Buies Creek Astros and was named a Carolina League All-Star; he was promoted to the Corpus Christi Hooks in June. In 25 games (17 starts) between the two clubs, he went 7–8 with a 2.23 ERA and a 1.15 WHIP. In 2019, Bielak returned to Corpus Christi to begin the season and was promoted to the Round Rock Express in May. Over 23 games (twenty starts), Bielak went 11–4 with a 4.22 ERA, striking out 119 over 121 2/3 innings.

On July 27, 2020, Bielak's contract was selected to the 40-man roster. He made his MLB debut that day against the Seattle Mariners and was the winning pitcher in an 8–5 contest. Bielak finished the 2020 season with Houston with a 6.75 ERA over 32 innings.

In 2021, Bielak went 3–4 while appearing in 28 games (two starts). He pitched fifty innings and struck out 46 batters while walking 21; he had a WHIP of 1.380 and an ERA of 4.50. Bielak made five appearances for Houston in 2022, spending the majority of the season with the Triple-A Sugar Land Space Cowboys. In 12 1/3 innings pitched, he recorded a 3.65 ERA with 12 strikeouts.

Bielak was optioned to Triple-A Sugar Land to begin the 2023 season. The Astros recalled him to the major league roster on April 30, 2023. On May 19, Bielak earned his first win of the season with a career-high nine strikeouts versus the Oakland Athletics. He established a number career highs at the major league level in 2023, including in games won with a 5–6 record, games stated (13) and innings pitched (80). He posted a 3.83 ERA, 5.19 FIP, 86 hits, 36 walks, and 12 home runs allowed, 1.525 walks plus hits per inning pitched (WHIP), and 7.0 strikeouts per nine innings pitched (K/9, 62 total).

Bielak made 10 appearances for Houston in 2024, compiling a 5.71 ERA with nine strikeouts across 17 1/3 innings pitched. On May 11, 2024, Bielak was designated for assignment by the Astros.

=== Oakland Athletics ===
On May 16, 2024, Bielak was traded to the Oakland Athletics in exchange for cash considerations. In three games for Oakland, he recorded a 3.18 ERA with three strikeouts across 5 2/3 innings pitched. Bielak was designated for assignment by the Athletics following the promotion of Jack O'Loughlin on May 25. He cleared waivers and was sent outright to the Triple–A Las Vegas Aviators on May 29. On September 8, the Athletics selected Bielak's contract, adding him to their active roster. After three more appearances, he was designated for assignment by Oakland on September 22. He cleared waivers and was sent outright to Triple–A Las Vegas a second time on September 25. Bielak elected free agency on October 15.

=== Arizona Diamondbacks ===
On February 25, 2025, Bielak signed a minor league contract with the Arizona Diamondbacks. In two starts for the Triple-A Reno Aces, he posted a 1-0 record and 2.79 ERA with five strikeouts across 9 2/3 innings pitched. Bielak was released by the Diamondbacks organization on May 10. On May 12, it was announced that Bielak had undergone season-ending shoulder surgery prior to his release.

=== Houston Astros (second stint) ===
On March 10, 2026, Bielak signed with the Tecolotes de los Dos Laredos of the Mexican League. However, prior to the start of the season on April 14, Bielak signed a minor league contract with the Houston Astros. In 9 games (3 starts) with Triple-A Sugar Land Space Cowboys he threw 24.2 innings going 0-1 with a 6.57 ERA and 11 strikeouts. He elected free agency on November 2.
