= Martín Maldonado =

Puerto Rican baseball player (born 1986)

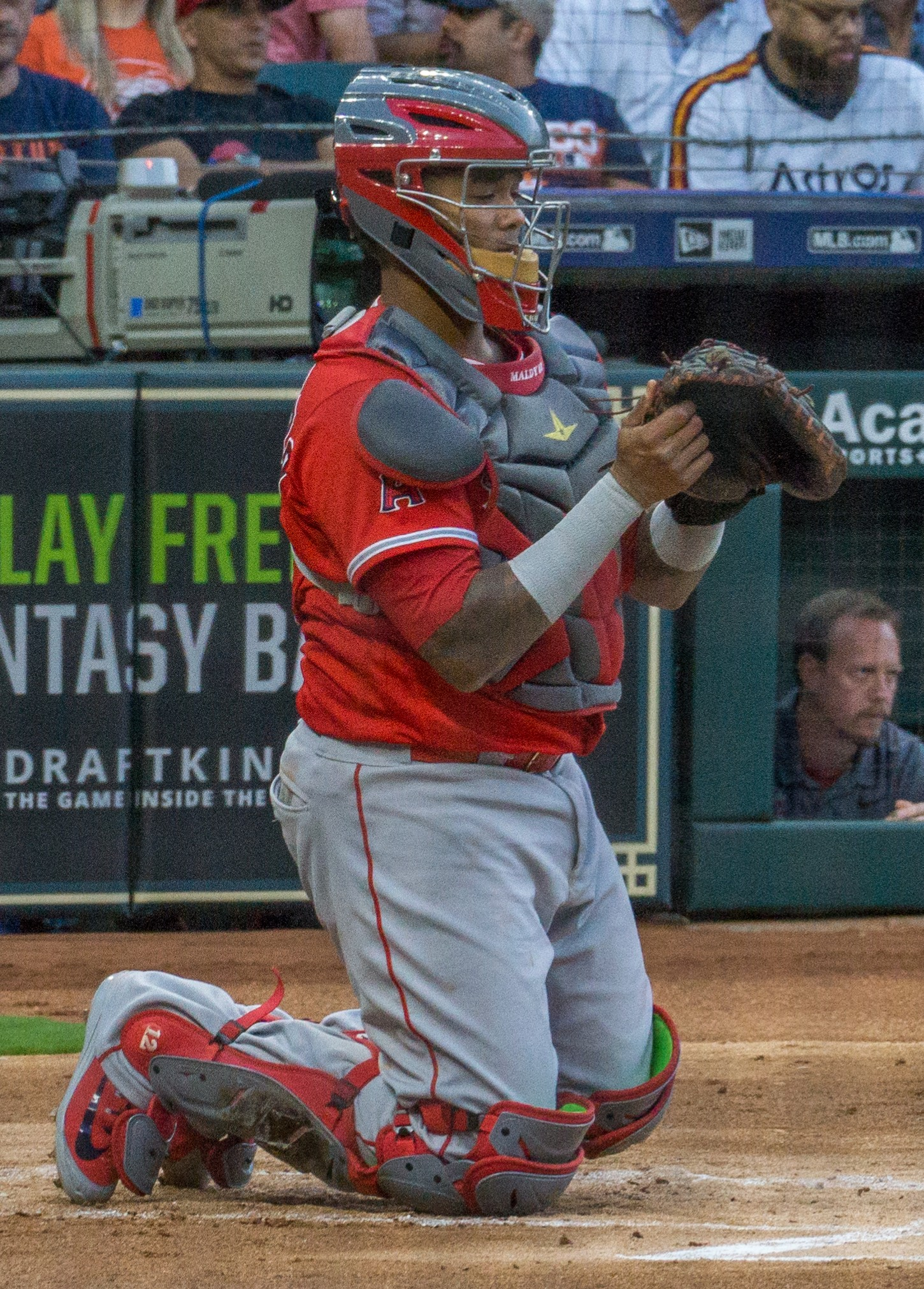
- Maldonado with the Los Angeles Angels in 2018

Detroit Tigers
- Catcher / Coach
- Born: August 16, 1986 (age 40); Naguabo, Puerto Rico
- Batted: Right Threw: Right

MLB debut
- September 3, 2011, for the Milwaukee Brewers

Last MLB appearance
- July 30, 2025, for the San Diego Padres

MLB statistics
- Batting average: .203
- Home runs: 119
- Runs batted in: 384
- Stats at Baseball Reference

Teams
- As player: Milwaukee Brewers (2011–2016); Los Angeles Angels (2017–2018); Houston Astros (2018); Kansas City Royals (2019); Chicago Cubs (2019); Houston Astros (2019–2023); Chicago White Sox (2024); San Diego Padres (2025); As coach: Detroit Tigers (2027–present)

Career highlights and awards
- World Series champion (2022); Gold Glove Award (2017)
Medals
Men's baseball
Representing Puerto Rico
World Baseball Classic
Silver medal – second place	2013 San Francisco	Team

Martín Benjamín Maldonado (born August 16, 1986) is a Puerto Rican former professional baseball catcher who currently serves as the quality control coach for the Detroit Tigers of Major League Baseball (MLB). He played in MLB for 15 seasons. During those 15 seasons, he played for the Milwaukee Brewers, Los Angeles Angels, Houston Astros, Kansas City Royals, Chicago Cubs, Chicago White Sox, and San Diego Padres.

The Angels selected Maldonado in the 27th round of the 2004 MLB draft, and he made his MLB debut in 2011 as a member of the Brewers. In 2017, he both won a Gold Glove and a Fielding Bible Award. The New York Times described him in October 2021, following a season in which Maldonado batted .172, as “arguably the worst hitter in baseball,” and Sports Illustrated wrote that "he quite possibly could be the worst-hitting everyday player in MLB history", although he has also been cited as a key factor in the success of the Astro pitching staff.

As a member of the Astros, Maldonado was the backstop for two American League (AL) pennant-winning teams, which included a World Series championship in 2022. He is one of two catchers in Astros' franchise history to catch multiple no-hitters: the first in 2019, the second in 2022, and the third August 1, 2023. He caught one complete game no-hitter and two combined no-hitters, and he became the first catcher in major league history to catch multiple combined no-hitters.

== Professional career ==
=== Anaheim/Los Angeles Angels ===
Maldonado was drafted by the Anaheim Angels in the 27th round of the 2004 Major League Baseball draft. He played his first professional season for the rookie-level Arizona League Angels that year, and batted .217/.277/.233.

In 2005, he again played for Arizona, and also played for the rookie-level Orem Owlz. After he played one more season for the Arizona Angels in 2006, in which he batted .222/.329/.270, he was released.

=== Milwaukee Brewers ===
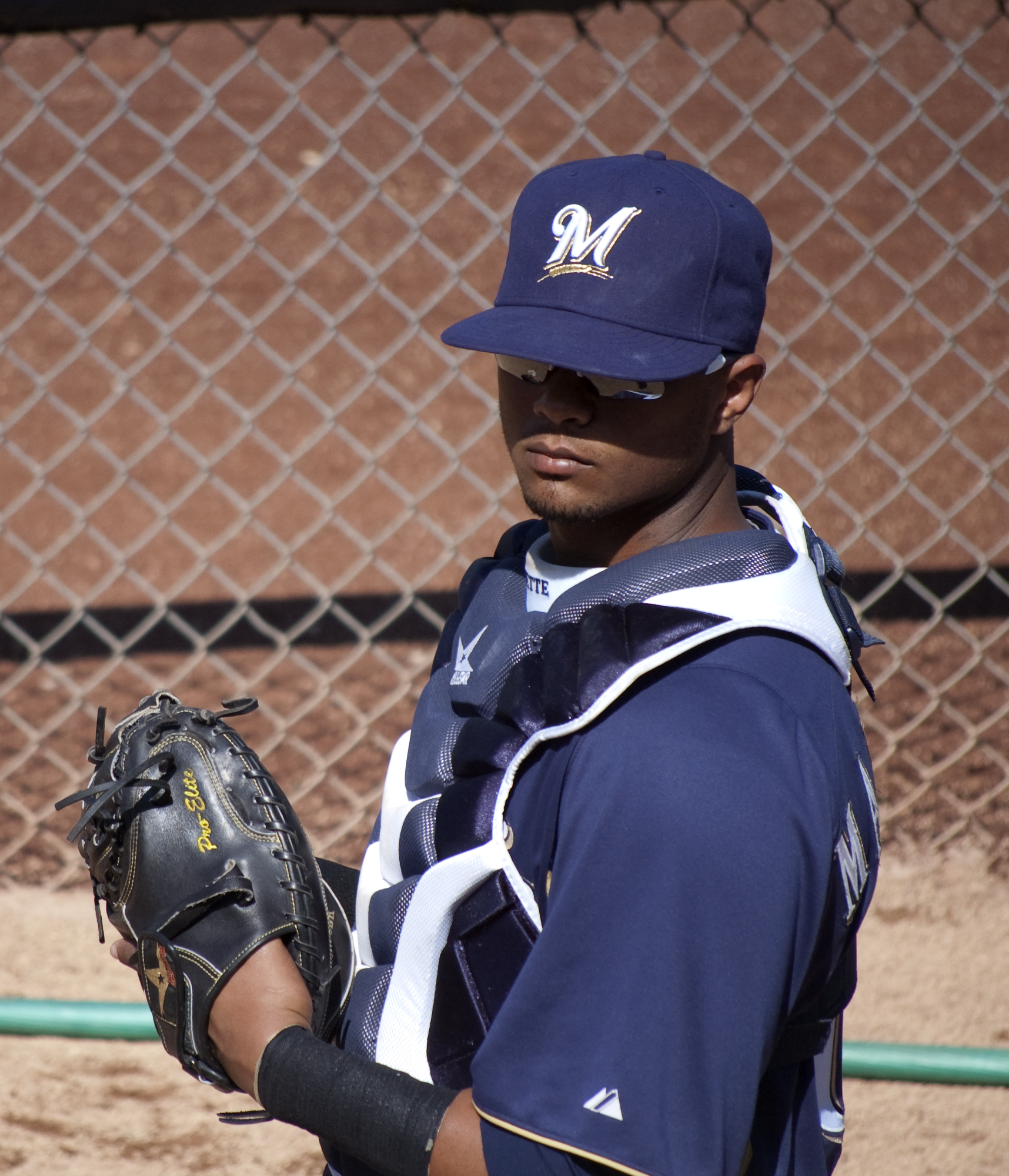
Maldonado with the Brewers in 2011

In 2007, Maldonado signed a minor league contract with the Milwaukee Brewers and played for the West Virginia Power of the Single–A South Atlantic League, batting .221/.309/.288. In 2008, he played for the Brevard County Manatees of the High–A Florida State League and the Huntsville Stars of the Double–A Southern League, batting a combined .229/.290/.313.

He began the 2009 season with the Manatees, and was called up to the Nashville Sounds of the Triple–A Pacific Coast League at mid-season. However, he returned to the Manatees to finish out the season. In 2009 he batted a combined .201/.295/.257. On defense, he was charged with a combined 17 passed balls in 93 games.

Maldonado played the majority of 2010 with Nashville, but also spent time with Huntsville and Brevard County. On defense, he was charged with a combined 13 passed balls in 96 games.

He made his Major League debut on September 3, 2011. He played in 3 games for the Brewers after his callup, striking out in his only at bat.

Maldonado was called up to the Brewers again in May 2012 when starting catcher Jonathan Lucroy went down with a freak hand injury, due to his wife dropping a suitcase on it. In 2012 with Nashville he batted .198/.270/.347. He played 78 games for the Brewers in 2012.

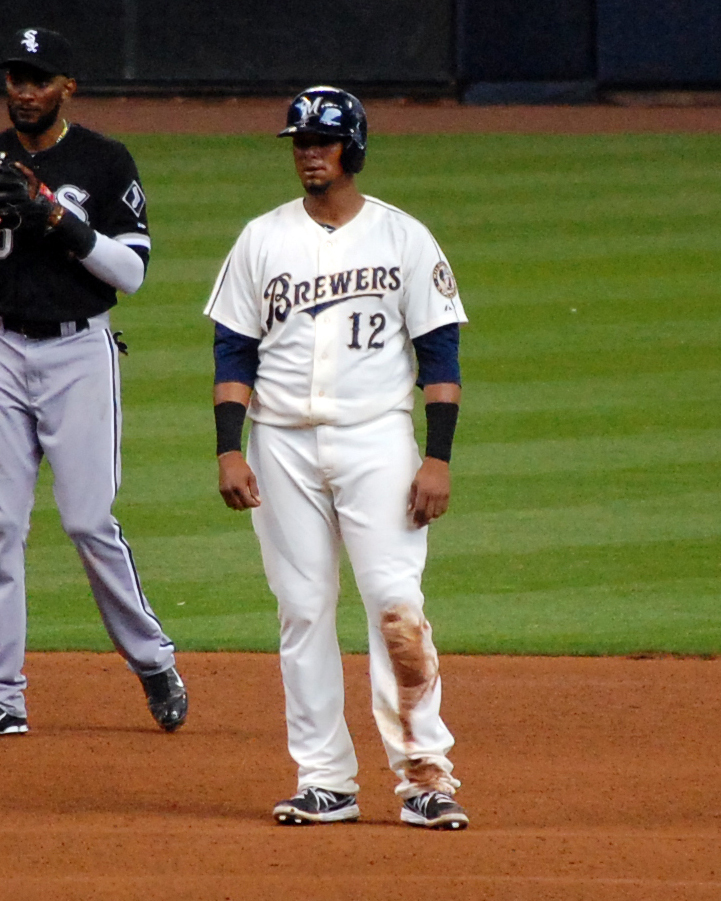
Maldonado with the Brewers in 2013

In 2013 he batted .169/.236/.284 for the Brewers. His .169 batting average was the lowest of all major leaguers with 200 or more plate appearances.

Maldonado was involved in an unusual play in which he hit the cover off a baseball. In a game against the Pittsburgh Pirates on April 18, 2014, Maldonado hit a ground ball to third base. By the time Pirates third baseman Pedro Álvarez fielded the grounder, the cover had partially come off the baseball and was hanging off its side; Álvarez threw the ball to first but it fell apart in midair, and made it to first only after several hops; Maldonado was awarded an infield hit.

Two days later Maldonado punched Pirate outfielder Travis Snider in the face in Pittsburgh, leaving Snider with a cut under a black eye. He was suspended for five games, and fined $2,500, which with the suspension resulted in him losing $16,200.

On May 31, 2015, Maldonado caught a 17-inning game and also hit his first walk-off home run, in the bottom of the 17th against the Arizona Diamondbacks. In 2015, he batted .210/.282/.293, and committed nine errors, third-most among NL catchers.

In 2016, he batted .202/.332/.351 for the Brewers. His seven errors were fourth-most among AL catchers.

=== Los Angeles Angels (second stint) ===
On December 13, 2016, Maldonado and pitcher Drew Gagnon were traded to the Los Angeles Angels in exchange for catcher Jett Bandy. Maldonado was named the Angels’ starting catcher and in 2017 played in a career-high 138 games, batting .221 with 14 home runs and 38 RBI. He won a 2017 Rawlings Gold Glove Award.

=== Houston Astros ===
On July 26, 2018, the Angels traded Maldonado to the Houston Astros in exchange for pitcher prospect Patrick Sandoval and international pool space cash. His 13 passed balls were second-most among AL catchers. In the 2018 postseason he batted .105/.150/.316. He became a free agent on October 29.

=== Kansas City Royals ===
The Kansas City Royals signed Maldonado nearly half a year later to a one-year, $2.5 million contract on March 11, 2019, following a season-ending elbow injury to catcher Salvador Pérez. Maldonado batted .227/.291/.366 over 74 games for the Royals.

=== Chicago Cubs ===
On July 15, the Royals traded Maldonado to the Chicago Cubs in exchange for left-handed pitcher Mike Montgomery. He had 11 at bats with the Cubs, in which he failed to get a hit. He remained with the team a total of 16 days.

=== Houston Astros (second stint) ===
==== 2019 ====
On July 31, 2019, the Cubs traded Maldonado to the Houston Astros in exchange for outfielder Tony Kemp. Maldonado caught a combined no-hitter versus the Seattle Mariners on August 3, 2019, hurled by Aaron Sanchez, Will Harris, Joe Biagini, and Chris Devenski.

For Houston, Maldonado batted .202/.316/.464. In 98 plate appearances in 27 games he hit six home runs, drew 13 walks, and scored 20 runs with just 17 hits for a run-scoring percentage of 56%. On defense, he threw out one-of-11 attempted base-stealers.

He hit his first career home run in World Series play in Game 2 in the ninth inning versus Washington Nationals reliever Javy Guerra in a 12–3 Houston defeat.

==== 2020 ====
On December 23, 2019, Maldonado signed a two-year contract with the Astros, worth $7 million. In 2020, he batted .215/.350/.378 with six home runs and 24 RBIs in 135 at bats, drawing 27 bases on balls in 165 plate appearances, and striking out 51 times (38% of the time). In the postseason, he batted .171/.275/.314, as he struck out 18 times in 35 at bats (51% of the time).

==== 2021 ====
On April 21, 2021, Maldonado agreed to a one-year, $5 million contract extension with the Astros, with a $5 million vesting option for the 2023 season.

In 2021, Maldonado batted .172/.272/.300 in 373 at bats. His .172 batting average was the lowest of all AL players with 200 or more plate appearances. He struggled especially in the clutch; in games that were late and close, he batted .089/.226/.178. He was the second-slowest catcher in major league baseball, and the slowest player on the Astros, with a sprint speed of 23.5 feet/second. His .195 batting average for the three years of 2019-21 was the lowest of all major leaguers with 800 or more plate appearances.

Sportswriter Tom Verducci observed: "He is a 35-year-old catcher with a career .212 batting average over more than 2,900 plate appearances. Only three other players in history ever stuck around for that many plate appearances by hitting so poorly: [pitcher] Cy Young and two famously inept hitting catchers, Bill Bergen and Jeff Mathis." The New York Times described him in October 2021, following a season in which Maldonado batted .172, as “arguably the worst hitter in baseball,” and Sports Illustrated wrote that "he quite possibly could be the worst-hitting everyday player in MLB history."

He had career-highs of 47 bases on balls and 127 strikeouts (striking out 34% of the time). On defense, his eight errors were second-most among AL catchers. He ranked fourth among all AL fielders in putouts (1,058). Among catchers, he also placed second in putouts (1,049), third in total zone runs as calculated by Baseball-Reference (five), fourth in assists (44), second in double plays turned (nine), second in caught stealing percentage (39.6%), and first in runners caught stealing (19). He was a Gold Glove finalist at catcher.

In the 2021 ALDS, Maldonado batted .067/.067/.067. He batted .071 in the ALCS. In Game 5 of the World Series versus the Atlanta Braves, Maldonado was 1-for-3 with 3 RBI, helping to rally the Astros to a 9–5 win in an elimination game.

==== 2022 ====
On May 6, 2022, Maldonado homered in the second inning versus the Detroit Tigers, providing the eventual decisive run in a 3–2 Astros win. Batting .116 entering the May 19 game, Maldonado doubled in eighth inning versus the Texas Rangers to provide insurance runs in a 5–1 Astros win.

On June 15, Maldonado was behind the plate for immaculate innings authored by Luis Garcia and Phil Maton, in the second and seventh inning, respectively. Each struck out the trio of Nathaniel Lowe, Ezequiel Duran, and Brad Miller of the Rangers at Globe Life Field. It was the first major league game featuring more than one immaculate inning (and the first time more than was thrown on the same date in the major leagues). Maldonado, the catcher for each of Houston's strikeouts – 14 in all – doubled and homered in a 9–2 Astros win.

On June 25, 2022, Maldonado caught a combined no-hitter of the New York Yankees, delivered by Cristian Javier, Héctor Neris, and Ryan Pressly. It was the 14th no-hitter in Astros history. Maldonado became the first player to catch more than one combined no-hitter; he previously caught a combined no-hitter for the Astros on August 3, 2019. With Maldonado behind the plate the following game, José Urquidy started the contest with 6 1/3 hitless innings versus the Yankees until a Giancarlo Stanton home run. The no-hit streak spanned 16 1/3 innings, tying an expansion-era record by the 1981 Astros pitching staff versus the 1981 Dodgers. (Note: Per the Elias Sports Bureau (ESB). Reliable data for individual innings is available starting in 1961. The 1973 Athletics were also held hitless for a 16 1/3-inning stretch by the 1973 Rangers and 1973 Twins.)

Oh July 2, Maldonado homered twice, including once versus Patrick Sandoval, whom the Astros traded to acquire him in 2018, to lead a 9–1 win over the Los Angeles Angels. The following game, Maldonado was behind the plate for 20 strikeouts by Astros pitching, including the first six innings by Framber Valdez, Neris (7th), Rafael Montero (8th), and Pressly (9th), establishing a new franchise record for a nine-inning contest. (Note: Astros pitching also established a record by becoming the first team in major league history to record 48 strikeouts over a three-game series without playing extra innings.) Maldonado caught a shutout of the Oakland Athletics on July 16 and hit his third career grand slam to lead a 5–0 win.

A start against the Atlanta Braves on August 21 was Maldonado's 90th appearance of the season, triggering a $4.5 million vesting option for the 2023 season. On September 5, Maldonado caught a 1–0 shutout of Texas with Hunter Brown hurling the first six innings and winning his major league debut. Maldonado singled home the game's only run. He scored four runs in a game for the first time on September 18, also hitting a home run, driving in four runs, and tying his career high with four hits, in an 11–2 win versus Oakland.

In 2022, he batted .186/.248/.352 with 116 strikeouts in 344 at bats. He reached career-highs of 15 home runs and 45 RBIs. He again struggled especially in the clutch; in games that were late and close, he batted .182/.222/.273. His .179 batting average for the two years of 2021-22 was the lowest of all major leaguers with 800 or more plate appearances. His .209 career batting average was the lowest career average of any nonpitcher over the prior 50 years (minimum 1,000 games). He was the third-slowest catcher in major league baseball, and the slowest player on the Astros, with a sprint speed of 22.4 feet/second. On defense, Maldonado appeared in 113 games, third in the AL among catchers, led AL catchers in putouts (1,025), assists (49), and passed balls (9). He tied for fifth in baserunners caught stealing (16), as he caught 26% of runners, and tied his career high with 46 stolen bases allowed. Astros pitching registered a 2.90 earned run average (ERA), a franchise record over a 162-game season, and the bullpen led the major leagues with a 2.80 ERA. (Note: Only the 1981 club posted a lower ERA, at 2.66, over an entire season, which was shortened to 110 games due to the players’ strike.)

Following the regular season, Maldonado was recognized with the Darryl Kile Award due to his cooperation with the media following games, providing salient insight, and for his handling of one of the most successful pitching staffs in baseball. He received nomination for the AL Silver Slugger Award at catcher. Maldonado was a major contributor on offense during the ALCS against the Yankees, posting a .500 on-base percentage during the four-game sweep. In Game 6 of the 2022 World Series, Maldonado induced a lead-off hit by pitch from Zack Wheeler that was the catalyst for the Astros four-run rally in the bottom of the sixth inning to capture the team's second championship in franchise history and Maldonado's first. After winning the World Series, he revealed that he had sustained a fractured hand and sports hernia on separate occasions in the month of August, but elected to continue to play through the injuries. He underwent surgery to repair the hernia on November 15, 2022.

==== 2023 ====
Maldonado hit his 100th career home run on June 13, 2023, in the seventh inning off Chad Kuhl of the Washington Nationals at Minute Maid Park. On August 1, Maldonado caught Framber Valdez' no-hitter against the Cleveland Guardians, his third career no-hitter caught, and the first of which was a complete game pitched.

=== Chicago White Sox ===
On January 5, 2024, Maldonado signed a one-year, $4.25 million contract with the Chicago White Sox that also contained a club option for 2025. In 48 games for the White Sox, he batted .119/.174/.230 with four home runs and 11 RBI. Maldonado was designated for assignment by the White Sox on July 17. He was released by the organization on July 21.

Following the 2024 season, Maldonado signed with the Leones del Escogido to play winter league baseball in the Dominican Professional Baseball League.

=== San Diego Padres ===
On January 16, 2025, Maldonado signed a minor league contract with the San Diego Padres. On March 27, the Padres selected Maldonado's contract after he made the team's Opening Day roster. In 64 appearances for San Diego, he slashed .204/.245/.327 with four home runs and 12 RBI. On July 31, Maldonado and Trenton Brooks were designated for assignment by the Padres following multiple trade deadline moves. He was released after clearing waivers on August 6. On September 1, Maldonado re-signed with the Padres on a minor league contract. On September 30, the Padres added Maldonado to their active roster ahead of their Wild Card Series matchup against the Chicago Cubs.

On October 18, 2025, Maldonado announced his retirement from professional baseball.

== Coaching career ==
On October 16, 2026, the Detroit Tigers hired Maldonado to serve as the team's quality control coach.

== International career ==
During the 2023 World Baseball Classic (WBC), Maldonado caught an ongoing perfect game versus Israel, which ended by a 10–0 final when he scored on a walk-off hit in the bottom of the eighth inning that invoked the tournament's mercy rule. However, it did not qualify as an official perfect game per the Elias Sports Bureau, due to lasting fewer than nine innings. The game was started by José De León and De León was relieved by Yacksel Ríos, Edwin Díaz, and Duane Underwood Jr.

== Defense and preparation ==
He's the glue of our team. He's one of the main leaders of our clubhouse, and his preparation is unmatched. His want and will to win, you can feel it. ... [He is] the MVP of our season.

— Lance McCullers Jr., starting pitcher and teammate in Houston

He spent his first six seasons as a backup catcher in Milwaukee. Maldonado's throwing arm has attracted praise, as he dispatched 19 of 48 would-be basestealers during the 2021 season, the fourth-best caught-stealing percentage in the league. When it came to his framing, however, he has been rated a below-average pitch framer; in October 2020 Fangraphs rated him -2.1 in framing, worse than the average catcher, and Baseball Savant rated him the 38th percentile of MLB catchers in framing. Primarily known for his defense and pitch-calling, as of 2021 he had not hit well in his career (.290 on-base percentage).

In spite of his low offensive productivity, Houston acquired Maldonado at consecutive trade deadlines, pursued him multiple times in free agency, and signed him to a contract extension in 2021. Astros teammate Carlos Correa lauded his dedication and meticulousness in preparation of the pitching staff. During his Gold-Glove winning campaign in Los Angeles in 2017 Maldonado first made an impression on McCullers, causing him to repeatedly urge then-Astros manager A. J. Hinch to acquire the veteran catcher.

== See also ==
- Houston Astros award winners and league leaders
- List of Houston Astros no-hitters
- List of Major League Baseball career assists as a catcher leaders
- List of Major League Baseball no-hitters
- List of Major League Baseball players from Puerto Rico
- List of Puerto Ricans
- Los Angeles Angels award winners and league leaders
