= Dustin Garneau =

American baseball player (born 1987)

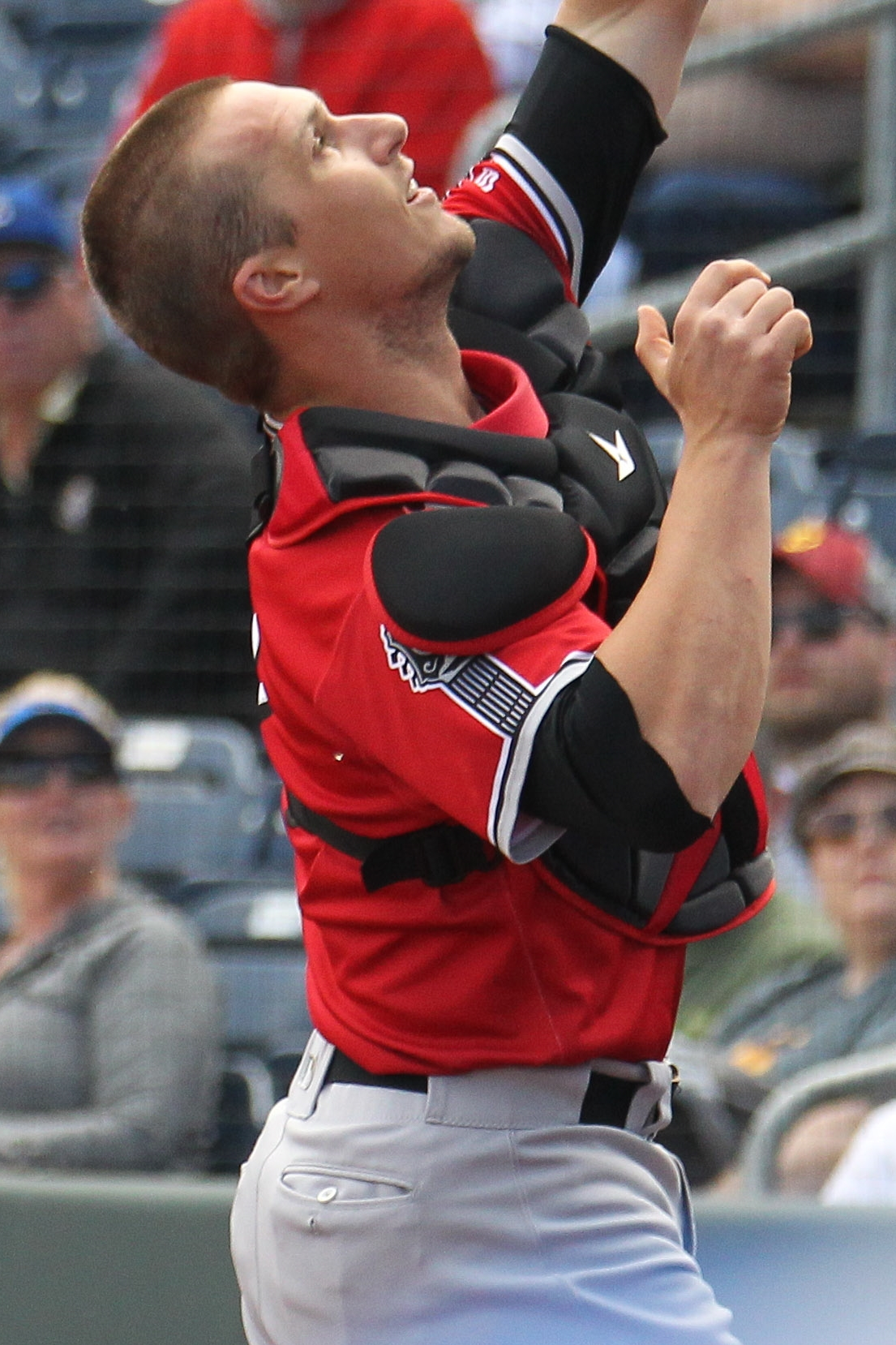
- Garneau with the Nashville Sounds in 2018

Atlanta Braves – No. 81
- Catcher / Bullpen coach
- Born: August 13, 1987 (age 39); San Pedro, California, U.S.
- Batted: Right Threw: Right

MLB debut
- August 20, 2015, for the Colorado Rockies

Last MLB appearance
- April 30, 2022, for the Detroit Tigers

MLB statistics
- Batting average: .205
- Home runs: 15
- Runs batted in: 54
- Stats at Baseball Reference

Teams
- As player: Colorado Rockies (2015–2017); Oakland Athletics (2017); Chicago White Sox (2018); Los Angeles Angels (2019); Oakland Athletics (2019); Houston Astros (2020); Detroit Tigers (2021–2022); As coach: Colorado Rockies (2025); Atlanta Braves (2026–present)

Dustin Thomas Garneau (born August 13, 1987) is an American former professional baseball catcher. He played in Major League Baseball (MLB) for the Colorado Rockies, Oakland Athletics, Chicago White Sox, Los Angeles Angels, Houston Astros and Detroit Tigers. He currently serves as the catching coach for the Atlanta Braves.

== Playing career ==
=== Amateur career ===
Garneau attended San Pedro High School in San Pedro, California. He enrolled at California State University, Fullerton to play college baseball for the Cal State Fullerton Titans.

=== Colorado Rockies ===
The Colorado Rockies selected Garneau in the 19th round of the 2009 Major League Baseball draft. Garneau made his professional debut with the rookie-level Casper Ghosts, hitting .250 in 23 games. In 2010, Garneau split the season between the Low-A Tri-City Dust Devils and the High-A Modesto Nuts, batting .243/.346/.405 with 3 home runs and 34 RBI between the two teams. In 2011, he played for the Single-A Asheville Tourists, slashing .255/.370/.513 with career-highs in home runs (17) and RBI (67) in 100 games with the team. In 2012, Garneau returned to Modesto and hit .243/.332/.383 with 6 home runs and 29 RBI. The following season, Garneau played for the Double-A Tulsa Drillers, posting a .236/.313/.414 with 13 home runs and 47 RBI in 96 games with the team. He returned to Tulsa the next year, and split the year with the Triple-A Colorado Springs Sky Sox, hitting .240/.327/.395 with 7 home runs and 42 RBI between the two teams. Garneau was assigned to the Triple-A Albuquerque Isotopes to begin the 2015 season.

On August 19, 2015, Garneau was selected to the 40-man roster and called up to the majors for the first time. He made his MLB debut the following day as the starting catcher against the Washington Nationals, and notched his first career hit in the game, a double off of Nationals starter Max Scherzer. In his rookie season, Garneau batted .157/.224/.286 with 2 home runs and 8 RBI in 22 major league games. Garneau split the 2016 season between Albuquerque and Colorado, hitting .235/.293/.368 with 1 home run and 6 RBI in 24 games with the Rockies. Garneau played in 22 games for Colorado in 2017, slashing .206/.260/.353 with 1 home run and 6 RBI.

=== Oakland Athletics ===
On August 4, 2017, Garneau was claimed off waivers by the Oakland Athletics. He was added to the Athletics' active roster the next day. In 19 games for Oakland, Garneau batted .159 with 1 homer and 3 RBI. Garneau was assigned to the Triple-A Nashville Sounds to begin the 2018 season. On May 21, 2018, Garneau was designated for assignment by the Athletics.

=== Chicago White Sox ===
On May 24, 2018, Garneau was claimed off waivers by the Chicago White Sox. He was assigned to the Triple-A Charlotte Knights and hit .252 in 45 games with the team. Garneau was promoted to the White Sox on August 3. Garneau only played in 1 game for Chicago on the year, going 1-for-2 with a walk. On October 2, the White Sox outrighted Garneau to the minors and removed him from the 40-man roster. He elected free agency on November 2.

=== Los Angeles Angels ===
On November 19, 2018, Garneau signed a minor league contract with the Los Angeles Angels organization. He opened the 2019 season with the Triple-A Salt Lake Bees. On May 22, 2019, Garneau's contract was selected and he was called up to the major league roster. On July 12, he was behind the plate for a combined no-hitter thrown by Taylor Cole and Félix Peña. He was designated for assignment by the Angels on July 31 after hitting .232/.346/.362 in 28 games.

=== Oakland Athletics (second stint) ===
On August 3, 2019, Garneau was claimed off waivers by the Oakland Athletics. In 7 games for Oakland, Garneau went 5-for-17 (.294) with 1 home run and 7 RBI. On August 16, Garneau was designated for assignment. He was outrighted to the Triple-A Las Vegas Aviators on August 19, and spent the remainder of the year there, going 8-for-26 (.308) in 8 games. He elected free agency on October 4, 2019.

=== Houston Astros ===
On November 26, 2019, Garneau signed a 1-year, $650K contract with the Houston Astros. For the COVID-19 shortened 2020 season, Garneau batted .158/.273/.289 with one home run and four RBIs in 38 at bats. On defense, his four errors (in 110.2 innings) tied for fourth-most in the AL, and he caught only 18% of attempted base-stealers. Garneau made his postseason debut in the 2020 American League Division Series against the Oakland Athletics as a defensive replacement for Martin Maldonado. He would later make his first postseason start in the 2020 American League Championship Series against the Tampa Bay Rays.

=== Detroit Tigers ===
On December 23, 2020, Garneau signed a minor league contract with the Detroit Tigers organization that included an invitation to spring training. Garneau did not make the big league club and split time between the Single-A Lakeland Flying Tigers and the Triple-A Toledo Mud Hens, batting .213/.324/.492 with 4 home runs and 11 RBI. On July 15, 2021, Garneau was released by the Tigers organization.

=== Colorado Rockies (second stint) ===
On July 22, 2021, Garneau signed a minor league contract with the Colorado Rockies organization. In 11 games for the Triple–A Albuquerque Isotopes, Garneau slashed .229/.357/.400 with one home run and six RBI.

=== Detroit Tigers (second stint) ===
The Tigers acquired Garneau from the Rockies on August 18, 2021, and promoted him to the major leagues that day. In 20 games with the Tigers, Garneau hit .210 with 6 home runs and 11 RBI.

On March 22, 2022, Garneau signed a one-year, $1.175 million contract with the Tigers, avoiding salary arbitration. In 8 games for Detroit, he went 3–for–10 (.300) with 1 RBI and 1 walk. On May 2, when teams were required to reduce the roster to 26 players, Garneau was designated for assignment. On May 4, he cleared waivers and was sent outright to the Triple–A Toledo Mud Hens. In 52 games for Toledo, Garneau batted .195/.298/.378 with seven home runs and 21 RBI. He elected free agency on October 6. Garneau announced his retirement from professional baseball on October 10.

== Coaching career ==
On October 25, 2024, Garneau was hired to serve as the new bullpen coach for the Colorado Rockies.

In November 2025, Garneau was hired to serve as catching coach for the Atlanta Braves for the 2026 season.

== Personal life ==
Garneau and his wife, Jacqlyn, have three sons.
