= Taylor Jones =

American baseball player (born 1993)

- First baseman / Outfielder
- Born: December 6, 1993 (age 32); Kent, Washington, U.S.
- Batted: Right Threw: Right

MLB debut
- July 26, 2020, for the Houston Astros

Last MLB appearance
- August 1, 2022, for the Houston Astros

MLB statistics
- Batting average: .234
- Home runs: 3
- Runs batted in: 19
- Stats at Baseball Reference

Teams
- Houston Astros (2020–2022)

Taylor Michael Jones (born December 6, 1993) is an American former professional baseball first baseman and outfielder. From Kent, Washington, Jones attended Gonzaga University and played college baseball for the Bulldogs. Selected by the Houston Astros in the 19th round of the 2016 MLB draft, he made his MLB debut in 2020.

== High school ==
Jones attended Kentwood High School in Covington, Washington, where he played basketball as a forward and baseball as a pitcher and first baseman. In 2012, his senior year, he led them to a 4A baseball state championship. Undrafted in the 2012 Major League Baseball draft, he enrolled at Gonzaga University where he played college baseball.

== College ==
In 2013, as a freshman at Gonzaga, Jones pitched to a 5.29 ERA over 17 innings while batting .233 in 30 at bats over 28 games. As a sophomore in 2014, he went 4-3 with a 4.71 ERA over 14 starts along with hitting .224 in 58 at bats with one home run in 29 games. In 2015, his junior year, he began focusing strictly on hitting and playing first base. Over 44 games, he hit .358(second in the conference)/.415(tenth)/.545(seventh) with five home runs and 30 RBIs in 134 at bats and was named to the All-WCC First Team. After the season, he was drafted by the Chicago Cubs in the 35th round of the 2015 Major League Baseball draft, but he did not sign. That summer, he played summer collegiate baseball for the Anchorage Bucs of the Alaska Baseball League. As a senior in 2016, he played in 56 games, leading the conference and second in the NCAA with 27 doubles and slashing .332(ninth)/.399/.509 in 232 at bats with two home runs, four triples (second), and 36 RBIs. He was named CoSIDA Academic All-American Third Team, Senior CLASS Award Second Team All-America and Finalist, All-West Region Second Team, All-WCC Second Team, CoSIDA Academic All-West Region, WCC All-Academic, and All-Fort Worth Regional Team.

== Professional career ==
=== Houston Astros ===
Jones was selected by the Houston Astros in the 19th round of the 2016 Major League Baseball (MLB) draft. He signed with Houston and made his professional debut with the Tri-City ValleyCats, hitting .252/.354/.413 with eight home runs and 38 RBIs over 70 games while earning New York-Penn League Mid-Season All-Star honors. In 2017, Jones split time between the Quad Cities River Bandits and the Buies Creek Astros, batting .222/.314/.321 with seven home runs and 45 RBIs over 105 games.

In 2018, Jones began the season with the Corpus Christi Hooks, earning Texas League Mid-Season All-Star honors, before he was promoted to the Fresno Grizzlies. Over 123 games between the two clubs, he slashed .281/.374/.480 with 18 home runs and 80 RBIs. Jones spent the 2019 season with the Round Rock Express, batting .291/.388/.501 with 22 home runs, 84 RBIs, and eight sacrifice flies (eight in the Pacific Coast League) over 125 games. He was named an MiLB 2019 Organization All Star. Following the 2019 season, Jones was added to the Astros' 40 man roster.

On July 26, 2020, Jones made his MLB debut for the Astros, going hitless in two at-bats. On August 22, Jones hit his first career home run off of Zach Davies of the San Diego Padres. For the 2020 season, Jones hit .191/.227/.381 with one home run and three RBIs over 21 at-bats. In 2021 with the Astros, Jones appeared in 35 games in which he slashed .245/.269/.402 with two home runs and 16 RBIs over 102 at-bats, playing 14 games at first base and 10 games in left field. In 2021 with Triple-A Sugar Land he batted .332/.425/.584 in 178 at bats, playing 22 games at first base, 16 games at third base, and 11 games in left field.

In 2022, Jones suffered with lower-back discomfort late in Spring Training, and was later placed on the 60-day injured list on April 20, 2022. He was activated on June 23, and optioned to the Triple-A Sugar Land Space Cowboys. Jones was called up and made his 2022 debut with the Astros on August 1, going 0-for-1, his only at bat in the majors for the season with Houston. In 2022 with Triple-A Sugar Land he batted .263/.370/.456 in 274 at bats, playing 36 games at first base, 23 games at third base, ten games in left field, and six games at DH. He was designated for assignment on September 13, 2022.

=== San Francisco Giants ===
On September 16, 2022, Jones was claimed off waivers by the San Francisco Giants. On November 9, Jones was removed from the 40-man roster and sent outright to the Triple–A Sacramento River Cats. He elected free agency the following day.

=== Los Angeles Angels ===
On January 13, 2023, Jones signed a minor league contract with the Los Angeles Angels. In 49 games for the Triple–A Salt Lake Bees, he hit .229/.333/.440 with eight home runs, 29 RBI, and five stolen bases. Jones elected free agency following the season on November 6.

== Coaching career ==
On January 29, 2024, the Houston Astros hired Jones to serve as the hitting coach for their rookie–level affiliate, the Florida Complex League Astros.
