= José Urquidy =

Mexican baseball player (born 1995)

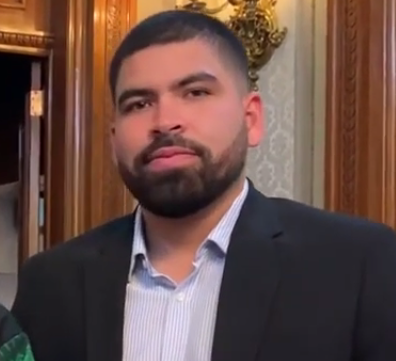
- Urquidy in 2019

Free agent
- Pitcher
- Born: May 1, 1995 (age 31); Mazatlán, Sinaloa, Mexico
- Bats: Right Throws: Right

MLB debut
- July 2, 2019, for the Houston Astros

MLB statistics (through 2026 season)
- Win–loss record: 29–18
- Earned run average: 4.08
- Strikeouts: 359
- Stats at Baseball Reference

Teams
- Houston Astros (2019–2023); Detroit Tigers (2025); Pittsburgh Pirates (2026); Chicago White Sox (2026); Philadelphia Phillies (2026)

Career highlights and awards
- World Series champion (2022)
Medals
Men's baseball
Representing Mexico
World Baseball Classic
Bronze medal – third place	2023 Miami	Team

José Luis Hernández Urquidy (born May 1, 1995) is a Mexican professional baseball pitcher who is a free agent. He has previously played in Major League Baseball (MLB) for the Houston Astros, Detroit Tigers, Pittsburgh Pirates, Chicago White Sox, and Philadelphia Phillies. Urquidy signed with the Astros as an international free agent in 2015 under the name of José Luis Hernández, as he was known until the start of the 2019 season. He made his MLB debut in 2019.

== Professional career ==
=== Houston Astros ===
==== Minor leagues ====
Urquidy signed with the Houston Astros as an international free agent on March 2, 2015. He made his professional debut that same year, and spent his first professional season with both the Greeneville Astros and Tri-City ValleyCats, pitching to a combined 2–1 record and 3.35 ERA in 37 2/3 innings. He pitched 2016 with the Quad Cities River Bandits and Lancaster JetHawks, posting a 6–5 record and 2.94 ERA in 24 games (21 starts).

Urquidy missed the 2017 season recovering from Tommy John surgery. He returned in 2018 and pitched for Tri-City and the Buies Creek Astros, going 2–2 with a 2.35 ERA in 13 games (11 starts). He started 2019 with the Corpus Christi Hooks before being promoted to the Round Rock Express.

==== 2019 (Rookie season) ====
On July 2, 2019, the Astros promoted Urquidy to the major leagues. He made his debut that night in a start versus the Colorado Rockies, pitching 3 2/3 innings. In 2019, he was 2–1 with a 3.95 ERA, as in nine games (seven starts) he pitched 41 innings.

In Game 4 of the 2019 World Series versus the Washington Nationals, Urquidy started for the Houston Astros, making him just the third Mexican-born World Series starting pitcher. He threw five innings, giving up two hits while striking out four. With the Astros winning the game, Urquidy became the second Mexican-born pitcher to win a World Series game after Fernando Valenzuela.

==== 2020 ====
In 2020, Urquidy was 1–1 with a 2.73 ERA in five starts covering 29 2/3 innings.

==== 2021 ====
In 2021, Urquidy was 8–3 with a 3.62 ERA in 20 starts covering 107 innings. In the postseason, he started Game 3 of the ALCS versus the Boston Red Sox, lasting less than three innings. Urquidy was the winning pitcher in both of Houston's victories versus the Atlanta Braves in the World Series. He started Game 2, throwing five innings of one-run ball with seven strikeouts as the Astros defeated Atlanta, 7–2. With the win, Urquidy became the first Mexican-born pitcher to earn multiple World Series wins. Pitching in relief in Game 5, he earned the win with one scoreless inning, making him the winningest internationally born player in World Series history.

==== 2022 ====
On June 26, 2022, Urquidy started a contest with 6 1/3 hitless innings versus the New York Yankees before ceding a home run to Giancarlo Stanton. Urquidy's performance extended a no-hit streak to 16 1/3 innings forged by Astros pitching, tying an expansion-era record. (Note: Per the Elias Sports Bureau (ESB). Reliable data for individual innings is available starting in 1961. Previously, the 1973 Athletics and 1981 Dodgers were no-hit for 16 consecutive innings. Urquidy's hitless start to the game succeeded a combined no-hitter of the Yankees by Cristian Javier, Héctor Neris, and Ryan Pressly.) On July 8, he reached a career-high eight innings in an 8–3 win versus the Oakland Athletics, allowing all three runs. Urquidy spun seven scoreless innings on August 3 versus Boston, delivered a game score of 83 and tied his career high of 10 strikeouts on the way to a 6–1 win. On August 15, he hurled 7 2/3 hitless innings versus the Chicago White Sox until allowing his lone hit against A. J. Pollock before being removed.

In a rematch of the prior year's World Series, Urquidy earned the win versus Atlanta after allowing two runs over seven innings, striking out six, as Houston won, 5–4. The Astros had won 15 of his last 20 starts, and over his last 11, Urquidy was 7–1 with a 2.48 ERA. He earned the win after tossing seven scoreless innings with eight strikeouts versus the Los Angeles Angels on September 4.

In 2022, Urquidy was 13–8 with a 3.94 ERA in 29 games (28 starts) covering 164 1/3 innings.

Urquidy made one appearance in the Astros' 2022 playoff run, pitching three scoreless innings in relief to help stabilize the Astros' bullpen in a 7–0 loss to the Philadelphia Phillies in Game 3 of the World Series. Urquidy became the first Mexican-born player in Major League history to appear in three World Series. The Astros would go on to win in six games, earning Urquidy his first World Series championship, and become the 15th Mexican-born player to win a World Series.

==== 2023 ====
On January 13, 2023, Urquidy avoided arbitration with the Astros, agreeing to a one-year, $3.025 million contract for the season. After exiting a start in the sixth inning against the Philadelphia Phillies with right shoulder soreness, the Astros placed Urquidy on the 15-day injured list on May 1. He was transferred to the 60-day injured list on June 23. On August 6, he returned from the IL to make a start versus the Yankees, which the Astros won, 9–7. Urquidy picked up the last four innings of a 13–5 win over Boston on August 28 to convert his first career save. In the third-to-last regular season game of 2023, Urquidy made and won a spot start versus the Arizona Diamondbacks by authoring six shutout innings, which was instrumental in the Astros' postseason push in a tight AL West division race with Seattle and Texas.

Urquidy started and won Game 4 of the American League Division Series (ALDS), a 3–2 win versus the Minnesota Twins, to clinch the series. Uruqidy delivered 5 2/3 innings with two runs allowed, both on solo home runs, three hits, one walk, and struck out six. The Astros advanced to, and extended their record, seventh-straight American League Championship Series (ALCS).

==== 2024 ====
Urquidy began the 2024 campaign on the injured list as the result of a right forearm strain. On June 5, 2024, it was announced that he would undergo season–ending elbow surgery. On November 4, 2024, Urquidy was removed from the 40–man roster to be sent outright to the Triple–A Sugar Land Space Cowboys, but he rejected the assignment and elected free agency.

=== Detroit Tigers ===
On March 8, 2025, Urquidy signed a one-year, $1 million contract with the Detroit Tigers. He was subsequently placed on the 60-day injured list as he continued to recover from Tommy John surgery. Urquidy was activated for his season and team debut on September 12. Urquidy was designated for assignment on September 18 but accepted a minor league option the next day. In two appearances for Detroit, he struggled to a 7.71 ERA with three strikeouts across 2 1/3 innings pitched. On November 6, the Tigers declined their option on Urquidy, making him a free agent.

=== Pittsburgh Pirates ===
On February 12, 2026, Urquidy signed a one-year, $1.5 million contract with the Pittsburgh Pirates. He made five appearances for the Pirates, struggling to an 0–1 record and 8.53 ERA with six strikeouts and one save across 6 1/3 innings pitched. On April 17, Urquidy was optioned to the Triple–A Indianapolis Indians. Across 17 starts for the Indians, he compiled a 5–4 record and 3.66 ERA with 73 strikeouts across 83 2/3 innings pitched. Urquidy was designated for assignment by the Pirates on July 24.

=== Chicago White Sox ===
On July 27, 2026, the Pirates traded Urquidy to the Chicago White Sox in exchange for Felix Doroteo. He made six appearances (including one start) for the White Sox, compiling a 2–1 record and 4.37 ERA with 15 strikeouts across 22 2/3 innings pitched. Urquidy was designated for assignment by Chicago on September 15.

=== Philadelphia Phillies ===
On September 17, 2026, Urquidy was claimed off of waivers by the Philadelphia Phillies.

== International career ==
On August 27, 2022, Urquidy committed to play for Team Mexico in the 2023 World Baseball Classic.

== Personal life ==
Prior to the 2019 season, Urquidy was known as José Luis Hernández.

== See also ==
- List of Major League Baseball players from Mexico
- List of World Series starting pitchers
