= Andre Scrubb =

American baseball player (born 1995)

Free agent
- Pitcher
- Born: January 13, 1995 (age 31); Fort Bragg, North Carolina, U.S.
- Bats: Right Throws: Right

MLB debut
- July 28, 2020, for the Houston Astros

MLB statistics (through 2021 season)
- Win–loss record: 2–1
- Earned run average: 3.32
- Strikeouts: 45
- Stats at Baseball Reference

Teams
- Houston Astros (2020–2021)

Andre Darrell Scrubb (born January 13, 1995) is an American professional baseball pitcher who is a free agent. He played college baseball at High Point University. Scrubb was selected by the Los Angeles Dodgers in the eighth round of the 2016 MLB draft and has played in Major League Baseball (MLB) for the Houston Astros. He has played for the Great Britain national baseball team.

== Amateur career ==
Scrubb attended C. D. Hylton High School in Woodbridge, Virginia. In 2013, his senior year, he pitched to a 6–2 record and a 1.57 ERA while batting .395.

Undrafted out of high school in the 2013 Major League Baseball draft, he enrolled at High Point University where he played college baseball. In 2014, Scrubb's freshman season at High Point, he appeared in 14 games (12 starts), going 2–5 with a 5.22 ERA. As a sophomore in 2015, he pitched in 19 games (making three starts) and went 6–1 with a 2.50 ERA, striking out 48 over 54 innings. After the season, he played in the Cape Cod Baseball League for the Chatham Anglers. In 2016, his junior year, he pitched to an 8–6 record and a 4.86 ERA over 14 starts. He struggled with command, walking 54 batters and throwing 15 wild pitches, but also striking out 94, in 74 innings. After the season, Scrubb was selected by the Los Angeles Dodgers in the eighth round of the 2016 MLB draft.

== Professional career ==
=== Los Angeles Dodgers ===
Scrubb signed with the Dodgers and made his professional debut with the Arizona League Dodgers, pitching 12 2/3 innings in which he compiled an ERA of 2.13. In 2017, Scrubb played for the Great Lakes Loons, posting a 6–2 record and a 1.74 ERA over 51 2/3 relief innings.

In 2018, Scrubb returned to Great Lakes to begin the year and was named a Midwest League All-Star. He was promoted to the Rancho Cucamonga Quakes in June and to the Tulsa Drillers in August. Over 38 relief appearances between the three clubs, Scrubb went 7–2 with a 2.86 ERA, striking out 72 batters over 63 innings. In 2019, he began the season with Tulsa, earning Texas League All-Star honors.

=== Houston Astros ===
On July 25, 2019, Scrubb was traded to the Houston Astros in exchange for Tyler White. Houston assigned him to the Double-A Corpus Christi Hooks, with whom he finished the year. Over 41 appearances (two starts) between the two clubs, Scrubb went 6–1 with a 2.78 ERA, striking out 76 over 64 2/3 innings.

On July 28, 2020, Scrubb was added to Houston's MLB roster following an arm injury to Joe Biagini. He made his MLB debut that night against the Los Angeles Dodgers. Over 23 2/3 relief innings pitched with the Astros in 2020, Scrubb went 1-0 with a 1.90 ERA, 24 strikeouts and 20 walks in 20 games. He was added to their postseason roster.

Scrubb began 2021 with Houston, but also spent time with the Sugar Land Skeeters with whom he pitched 15 innings. Scrubb pitched a total of 19 2/3 innings with the Astros, going 1-1 with a 5.03 ERA and 21 strikeouts. On August 10, 2021, he was placed on the 60-day injured list with a right shoulder strain. On November 30, Scrubb was designated for assignment and outrighted to the Skeeters.

Scrubb missed the majority of the 2022 season with injury, appearing in only 5 games for the Single-A Fayetteville Woodpeckers. He elected free agency following the season on November 10, 2022.

=== Southern Maryland Blue Crabs ===
On April 6, 2023, Scrubb signed with the Southern Maryland Blue Crabs of the Atlantic League of Professional Baseball. In 15 relief appearances, he posted a 1–1 record with a stellar 1.15 ERA, striking out 18 over 15 2/3 innings.

=== Diablos Rojos del México ===
On June 7, 2023, Scrubb had his contract purchased by the Diablos Rojos del México of the Mexican League. In 11 relief appearances, he posted a 1–0 record with a 7.20 ERA and 6 strikeouts in 10.0 innings pitched.

=== Guerreros de Oaxaca ===
On July 3, 2023, Scrubb was traded to the Guerreros de Oaxaca of the Mexican League. In 13 games for Oaxaca, he posted a 3.21 ERA with 15 strikeouts over 14 innings of work.

=== Southern Maryland Blue Crabs (second stint) ===
On August 15, 2023, Scrubb signed with the Southern Maryland Blue Crabs of the Atlantic League of Professional Baseball. In 26 total appearances for the team in 2023, Scrubb logged a 1-2 record and 1.52 ERA with 36 strikeouts and 8 saves across 29 2/3 innings pitched.

=== New York Mets ===
On December 3, 2023, Scrubb signed a minor league contract with the New York Mets. He split the 2024 season between the Double-A Binghamton Rumble Ponies and Triple-A Syracuse Mets. In 7 appearances for the two affiliates, Scrubb accumulated an 0-1 record and 4.15 ERA with 7 strikeouts across 13 innings pitched. He elected free agency following the season on November 4, 2024.

=== Southern Maryland Blue Crabs (third stint) ===
On May 7, 2025, Scrubb signed with the Southern Maryland Blue Crabs of the Atlantic League of Professional Baseball. In 33 appearances for Southern Maryland, he posted a 3-2 record and 4.91 ERA with 30 strikeouts and 12 saves over 33 innings of work. On August 20, Scrubb was released by the Blue Crabs.

=== High Point Rockers ===
On August 31, 2025, Scrubb signed with the High Point Rockers of the Atlantic League of Professional Baseball. He pitched in two games and gave up no earned runs with two strikeouts over two innings pitched in relief. Scrubb was released on September 16.

== International career ==
Scrubb played for the Great Britain national baseball team at the 2023 World Baseball Classic.
