= Cy Sneed =

American baseball player (born 1992)

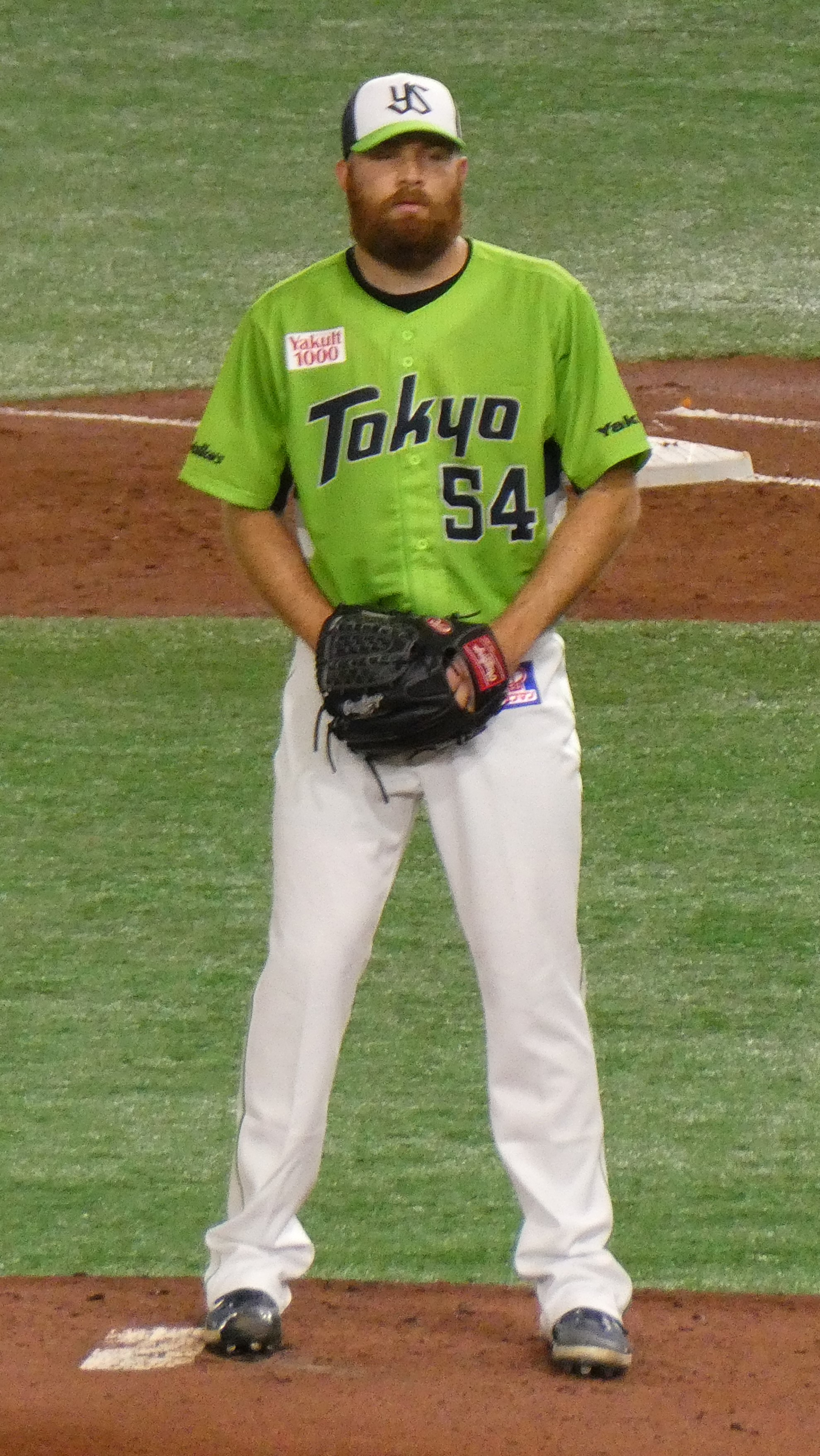
- Sneed with the Tokyo Yakult Swallows
- Pitcher
- Born: October 1, 1992 (age 34); Elko, Nevada, U.S.
- Batted: Right Threw: Right

Professional debut
- MLB: June 27, 2019, for the Houston Astros
- NPB: May 9, 2021, for the Tokyo Yakult Swallows

Last appearance
- MLB: September 26, 2020, for the Houston Astros
- NPB: October 2, 2024, for the Tokyo Yakult Swallows

MLB statistics
- Win–loss record: 0–4
- Earned run average: 5.59
- Strikeouts: 44

NPB statistics
- Win–loss record: 24–24
- Earned run average: 3.95
- Strikeouts: 357
- Stats at Baseball Reference

Teams
- Houston Astros (2019–2020); Tokyo Yakult Swallows (2021–2024)

Career highlights and awards
- NPB: Japan Series champion (2021); NPB All-Star (2023)

Cy Robert Sneed (born October 1, 1992) is an American former professional baseball pitcher. He played in Major League Baseball (MLB) for the Houston Astros and in Nippon Professional Baseball (NPB) for the Tokyo Yakult Swallows.

== Career ==
=== Amateur ===
Sneed attended Twin Falls High School in Twin Falls, Idaho. In 2011, his senior year, Sneed pitched to a 9–0 win–loss record with a 1.36 earned run average (ERA) with 130 strikeouts, and batted .467 with 11 home runs and 38 runs batted in. He led his team to win the Class 4A state championship. Sneed was named the Times-News Player of the Year, and the Gatorade Baseball Player of the Year for Idaho.

The Texas Rangers selected Sneed in the 35th round of the 2011 MLB draft. He did not sign, opting to enroll at Dallas Baptist University to play NCAA baseball for the Dallas Baptist Patriots. He played with the Hyannis Harbor Hawks in the Cape Cod Baseball League in the summer of 2013. As a junior at Dallas Baptist in 2014, Sneed had an 8–3 win–loss record with a 3.55 ERA and 82 strikeouts in 104 innings pitched.

=== Milwaukee Brewers ===
The Milwaukee Brewers selected Sneed in the third round of the 2014 MLB draft, and he signed with the Brewers. After signing, he was assigned to the Helena Brewers where he pitched to an 0–2 record and 5.92 ERA in 11 games. Sneed spent the first half of the 2015 season with the Wisconsin Timber Rattlers, and after going 3–7 with a 2.68 ERA in 15 games (13 starts), was named a Midwest League All-Star. He spent the second half of the season with the Brevard County Manatees where he pitched to a 3–4 record and 2.47 ERA in 11 games started.

=== Houston Astros ===
On November 19, 2015, the Brewers traded Sneed to the Houston Astros for Jonathan Villar. He spent the 2016 season with the Corpus Christi Hooks where he posted a 6–5 record and 4.04 ERA in 25 games. In 2017, he pitched for both Corpus Christi and the Fresno Grizzlies, going a combined 10–6 with a 5.97 ERA and 1.59 WHIP in 26 total games (18 starts) between the two teams. He returned to Fresno in 2018. In 2019, Sneed opened the season with the Round Rock Express, and was named to the Pacific Coast League all-star team. He posted a 7–6 record with a 4.19 ERA over 81.2 innings for them.

On June 27, 2019, the Astros promoted Sneed to the major leagues. With Houston in 2019, Sneed posted a 0–1 record with a 5.48 ERA over 21 1/3 innings. In 2020 he was 0–3 with a 5.71 ERA in 18 relief appearances over 17 1/3 innings in which he struck out 21 batters.

=== Tokyo Yakult Swallows ===
On December 2, 2020, the Astros requested unconditional release waivers on Sneed so that he could sign with the Tokyo Yakult Swallows of Nippon Professional Baseball.

On November 2, 2022, Sneed re-signed with the Swallows for the 2023 season. On June 23, 2023, Sneed tossed a complete game shutout against the Chunichi Dragons; he allowed 6 hits and struck out 5 batters in the game to earn his seventh consecutive win.

On November 28, 2023, Sneed re-signed a one-year contract worth $1.55 million for the 2024 season. In 24 appearances for the Swallows, he logged a 2–8 record and 5.03 ERA with 89 strikeouts across 120 innings pitched. On November 6, 2024, the Swallows announced they would not retain Sneed for the 2025 season, making him a free agent.

== Personal life ==
Sneed has an older brother, Zeb. They were born in Elko, Nevada. His father, a sergeant in the Nevada Highway Patrol, took a demotion to move the family to Twin Falls in 2007, because their high school had a stronger baseball team that Sneed and his brother could play for. Sneed is the third member of his family to be selected in the MLB draft; his father played college baseball but did not sign with a professional team, and his brother was drafted and played professionally.

Sneed and his wife, Hannah, were married in November 2014. An avid outdoorsman, he hunts and fishes.
