= Enoli Paredes =

Dominican baseball player (born 1995)

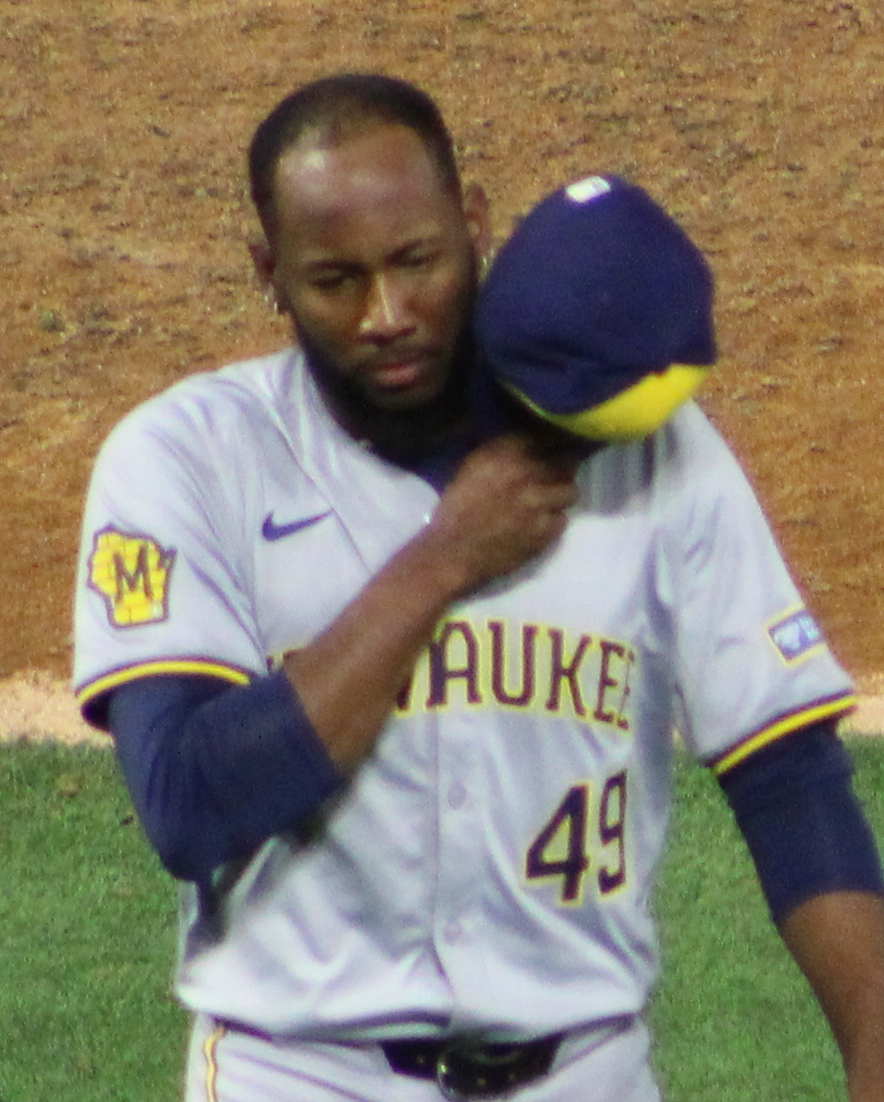
- Paredes with the Milwaukee Brewers in 2024

Free agent
- Pitcher
- Born: September 28, 1995 (age 30); El Limón, Dominican Republic
- Bats: Right Throws: Right

MLB debut
- July 24, 2020, for the Houston Astros

MLB statistics (through 2024 season)
- Win–loss record: 4–3
- Earned run average: 3.00
- Strikeouts: 53
- Stats at Baseball Reference

Teams
- Houston Astros (2020–2022); Milwaukee Brewers (2024); Chicago Cubs (2024)

Enoli Norverto Paredes (born September 28, 1995) is a Dominican professional baseball pitcher who is a free agent. He has previously played in Major League Baseball (MLB) for the Houston Astros, Milwaukee Brewers, and Chicago Cubs.

== Career ==
=== Houston Astros ===
On December 3, 2014, Paredes signed with the Houston Astros as an international free agent. He made his professional debut with the Gulf Coast League Astros in 2016, going 1–3 with a 3.74 ERA over 33 2/3 innings. He appeared in 8 games for the Quad Cities River Bandits in 2017, going 1–3 with a 2.11 ERA over 38 innings. He missed the second half of 2017 with an elbow injury. He split the 2018 season between Quad Cities and the Buies Creek Astros, going a combined 6–4 with a 1.43 ERA over 68 1/3 innings. He split the 2019 season between the Fayetteville Woodpeckers and the Corpus Christi Hooks, going a combined 5–4 with a 2.78 ERA over 94 innings.

On November 20, 2019, the Astros added Paredes to their 40-man roster to protect him from the Rule 5 draft. On July 24, 2020, Paredes made his MLB debut against the Seattle Mariners, pitching one scoreless inning. In 2020 he was 3–3 with a 3.05 ERA in 22 relief appearances in which he pitched 20.2 innings. Paredes made his postseason debut against the Oakland Athletics in the 2020 American League Division Series.

In 2021, Paredes pitched in 16 games for Houston, struggling to a 6.32 ERA with 15 strikeouts across 8 2/3 innings of work. In 2022, he appeared in only three games for the team, allowing one run on three hits and three walks with two strikeouts in three innings of work.

Paredes was optioned to the Triple-A Sugar Land Space Cowboys to begin the 2023 season. He did not appear in a game for the Astros the entire season, spending the year with Sugar Land. In 52 appearances out of the bullpen for the Space Cowboys, he pitched to a 4.80 ERA with 66 strikeouts and 6 saves across 54 1/3 innings pitched. Following the season on November 6, Paredes was removed from the 40–man roster and sent outright to Triple–A. He elected free agency the same day.

=== Milwaukee Brewers ===
On November 17, 2023, Paredes signed a minor league contract with the Milwaukee Brewers. In 18 games for the Triple–A Nashville Sounds, he recorded a 1.31 ERA with 34 strikeouts and 5 saves across 20 2/3 innings pitched. On May 24, 2024, the Brewers selected Paredes' contract, adding him to their active roster. He was placed on the injured list with right forearm tendinitis on July 3, and was transferred to the 60–day injured list on August 11. Paredes was activated on September 12. He made 17 total appearances for Milwaukee, compiling a 1.74 ERA with 14 strikeouts over 20 2/3 innings pitched. Paredes was designated for assignment by the Brewers on September 20.

=== Chicago Cubs ===
On September 23, 2024, Paredes was claimed off waivers by the Chicago Cubs. He made one scoreless appearance for the Cubs, striking out two batters in one innings pitched. On November 4, Paredes was removed from the 40–man roster and sent outright to the Triple–A Iowa Cubs, but he rejected the assignment and elected free agency.

=== Atlanta Braves ===
On November 11, 2024, Paredes signed a minor league contract with the Atlanta Braves. He made 46 appearances for the Triple-A Gwinnett Stripers in 2025, logging a 2–3 record and 4.40 ERA with 72 strikeouts and three saves across 57 1/3 innings pitched. Paredes elected free agency following the season on November 6, 2025.

=== Baltimore Orioles ===
On November 10, 2025, Paredes signed a minor league contract with the Baltimore Orioles organization. He made 35 appearances (including one start) for the Triple–A Norfolk Tides, compiling a 2–9 record and 6.10 ERA with 38 strikeouts across 41 1/3 innings pitched. Paredes was released by the Orioles organization on August 4, 2026.

== Personal life ==
Enoli's father was a rookie league outfielder with the Montreal Expos.

== See also ==
- List of Major League Baseball players from the Dominican Republic
