= Jack Mayfield =

American baseball player (born 1990)

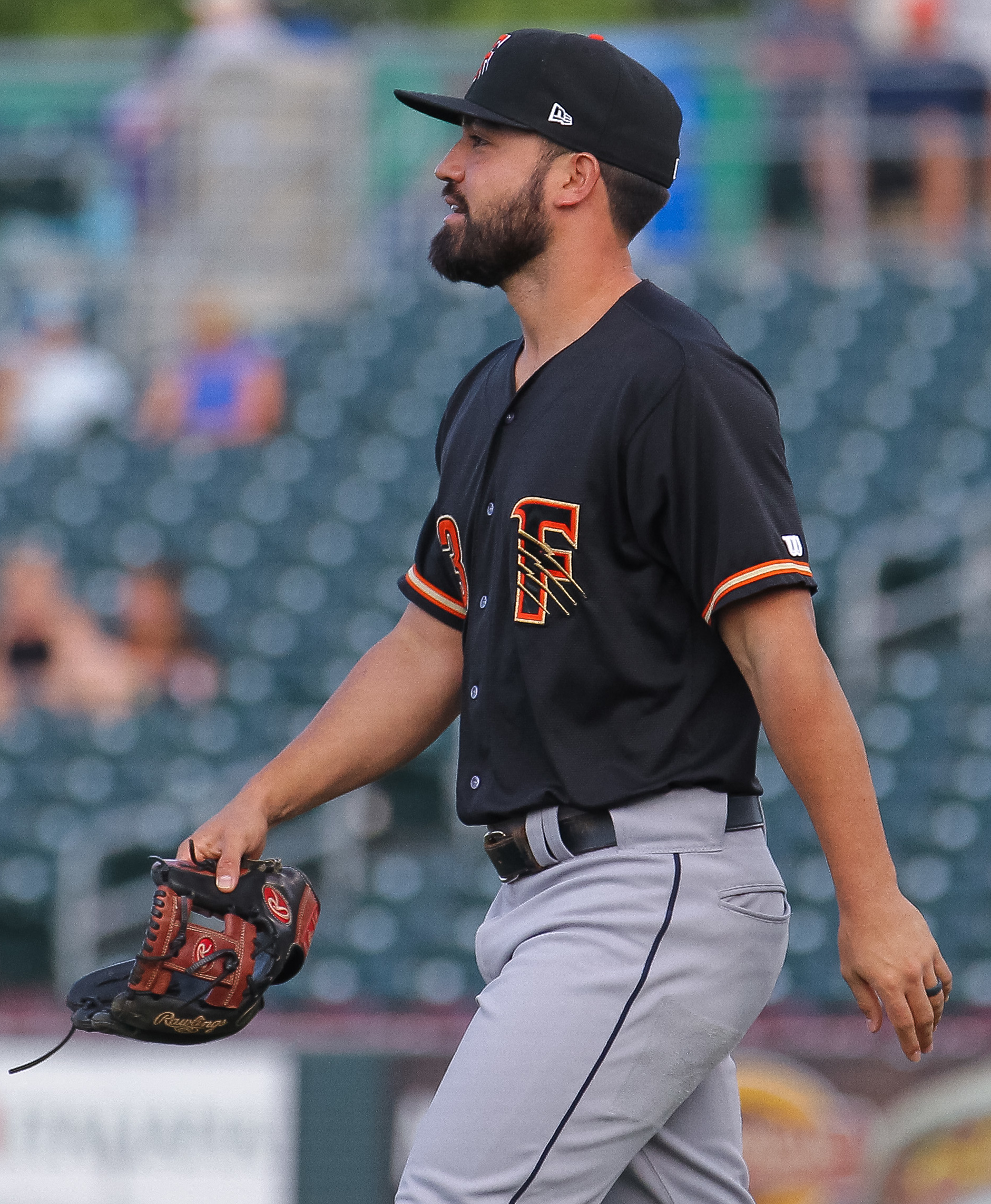
- Mayfield with the Fresno Grizzlies in 2017

Toros de Tijuana – No. 25
- Infielder
- Born: September 30, 1990 (age 35); Del Rio, Texas, U.S.
- Bats: Right Throws: Right

MLB debut
- May 27, 2019, for the Houston Astros

MLB statistics (through 2022 season)
- Batting average: .201
- Home runs: 13
- Runs batted in: 53
- Stats at Baseball Reference

Teams
- Houston Astros (2019–2020); Los Angeles Angels (2021); Seattle Mariners (2021); Los Angeles Angels (2021–2022)

David Jack Mayfield (born September 30, 1990) is an American professional baseball infielder for the Toros de Tijuana of the Mexican League. The Houston Astros signed Mayfield as an undrafted free agent in 2013. He debuted in the major leagues in 2019 for Houston and has also played in Major League Baseball (MLB) for the Los Angeles Angels and Seattle Mariners.

== Career ==
=== Amateur career ===
Mayfield attended Del Rio High School in Del Rio, Texas. He attended the University of Oklahoma and played college baseball for the Oklahoma Sooners from 2010 through 2013. In 2011, he played collegiate summer baseball with the Brewster Whitecaps of the Cape Cod Baseball League.

=== Houston Astros ===
The Astros signed Mayfield as an undrafted free agent on June 16, 2013. He split his debut season of 2013 between the Greeneville Astros and the Vermont Lake Monsters. He split 2014 between the Quad Cities River Bandits and the Lancaster JetHawks. He split 2015 between Lancaster and the Corpus Christi Hooks. His 2016 and 2017 seasons were split between Corpus Christi and the Fresno Grizzlies. He spent the entire 2018 season with Fresno. In 2019, he opened the season with the Round Rock Express, hitting .287/.350/.566/.916 with 26 home runs and 79 RBI.

The Astros promoted him to the major leagues on May 27, 2019, and he made his major league debut that day. He hit .156 with 2 home runs and 5 RBI for the Astros in 2019.

In 2020, he batted .190/.239/.214 with no home runs and three RBIs in 42 at bats.

=== Atlanta Braves ===
On November 20, 2020, Mayfield was claimed off waivers by the Atlanta Braves. On February 24, 2021, Mayfield was designated for assignment by the Braves following the waiver claim of Guillermo Heredia.

=== Los Angeles Angels ===
On February 25, 2021, Mayfield was claimed off waivers by the Los Angeles Angels. Mayfield was designated for assignment on April 24, 2021, after going hitless in 3 at-bats.

=== Seattle Mariners ===
On April 27, 2021, Mayfield was claimed off waivers by the Seattle Mariners. Mayfield was designated for assignment by Seattle after batting 6-for-34 in 11 games with the team. On June 1, he pitched for one out during a 12–6 loss to the Oakland Athletics.

=== Los Angeles Angels (second stint) ===
On June 13, 2021, Mayfield was claimed off waivers by the Los Angeles Angels and was optioned to the Triple-A Salt Lake Bees. On July 6, he was recalled to the major league team. On August 30, Mayfield hit his first career grand slam off of New York Yankees starter Corey Kluber. Appearing in 73 games for the Angels, Mayfield hit .227/.285/.419 with career-highs in home runs (10) and RBI (36).

In 2022, Mayfield played in 23 games for the Angels, hitting .186/.230/.271 with one home run and 6 RBI. He was designated for assignment on July 4, 2022, following the acquisition of Touki Toussaint. He cleared waivers and was sent outright to Salt Lake on July 8. In 54 games for Triple-A Salt Lake, Mayfield had better numbers, with a .247/.292/.417 slash to go along with 6 home runs and 31 RBI. He elected free agency following the season on November 10, 2022.

=== Toros de Tijuana ===
On March 6, 2023, Mayfield signed with the Toros de Tijuana of the Mexican League. In 85 games for Tijuana, he batted .305/.375/.473 with 11 home runs and 58 RBI.

Mayfield made 69 appearances for Tijuana in 2024, batting .302/.365/.437 with five home runs, 30 RBI, and three stolen bases.

In 2025, Mayfield re-signed with Tijuana for a third season. In 75 games he hit .301/.390/.465 with 8 home runs, 58 RBIs and 7 stolen bases.

== Personal life ==
Mayfield and his wife, Jackie, have two children, Jackson Drew, and Rylee James.
