= Carlos Sanabria =

Venezuelan baseball player (born 1997)

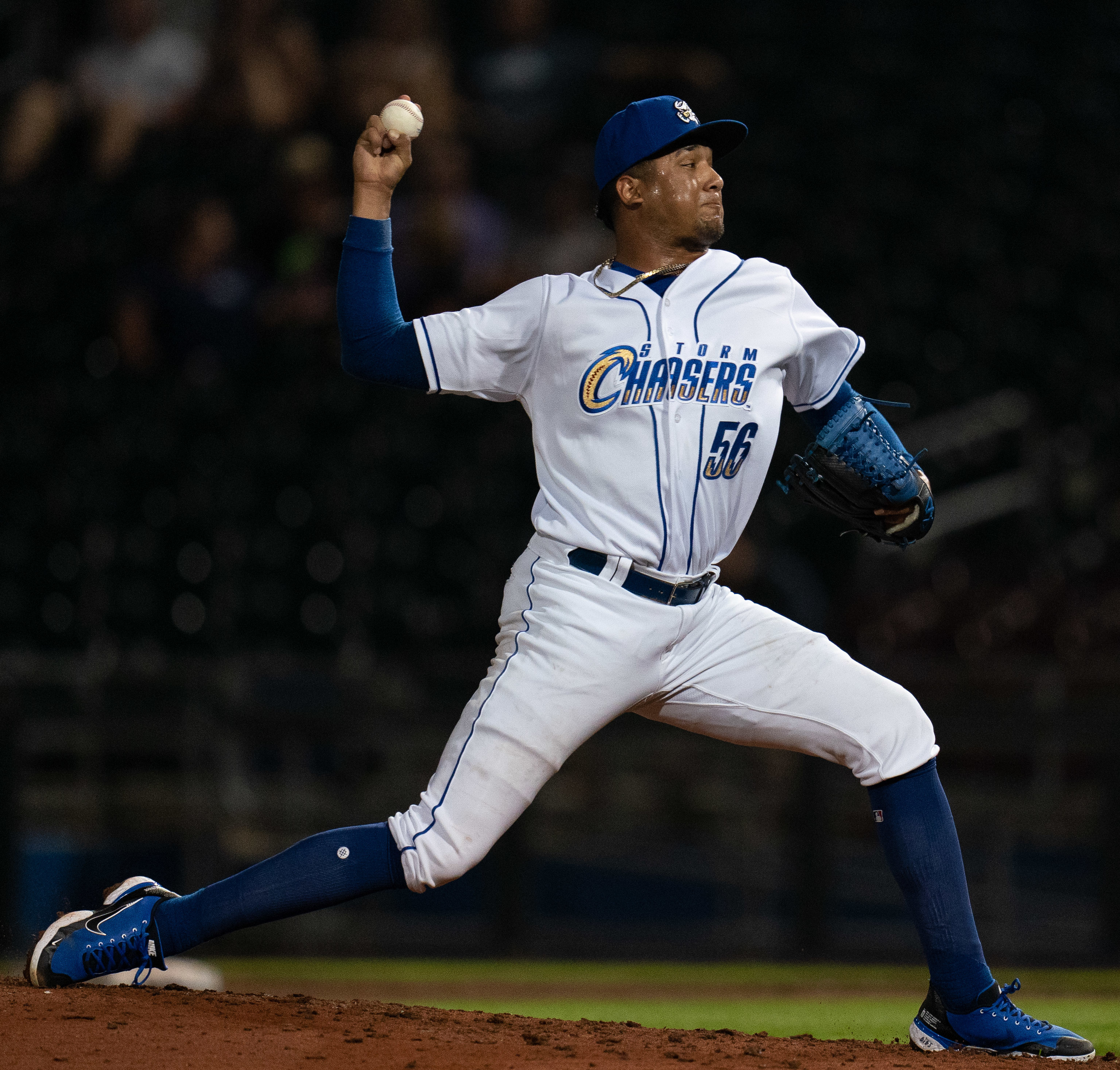
- Sanabria with the Omaha Storm Chasers in 2021
- Pitcher
- Born: January 24, 1997 (age 29); La Victoria, Venezuela
- Batted: Right Threw: Right

MLB debut
- August 5, 2020, for the Houston Astros

Last MLB appearance
- August 9, 2020, for the Houston Astros

MLB statistics
- Win–loss record: 0–0
- Earned run average: 9.00
- Strikeouts: 2
- Stats at Baseball Reference

Teams
- Houston Astros (2020)

Carlos Miguel Sanabria (born January 24, 1997) is a Venezuelan former professional baseball pitcher. He played in Major League Baseball (MLB) for the Houston Astros.

== Career ==
=== Houston Astros ===
On March 7, 2014, Sanabria signed with the Houston Astros as an international free agent. He made his professional debut with the Astros' minor league affiliate in the Dominican Summer League, posting a 2.82 ERA in 15 appearances. In 2015, Sanabria played for the Rookie-level GCL Astros, logging a 2-5 record and 4.71 ERA in 15 games with the team. The following year, Sanabria split the season between the Rookie-level Greeneville Astros and the Low-A Tri-City ValleyCats, accumulating a 2-3 record and 3.69 ERA between the two teams. In 2017, he played with the Single-A Quad Cities River Bandits, recording a 4-4 record and 4.46 ERA with 78 strikeouts in 80.2 innings of work. In 2018, he split the year between the High-A Buies Creek Astros and Quad Cities, registering a cumulative 3-1 record and 4.07 ERA in 36 appearances. In 2019, Sanabria split the season between the High-A Fayetteville Woodpeckers and the Double-A Corpus Christi Hooks, pitching to a 6-3 record and 2.84 ERA with 86 strikeouts in 66.2 innings pitched between the two teams.

On August 1, 2020, Sanabria was selected to the 40-man roster and promoted to the major leagues for the first time. He made his major league debut on August 5 against the Arizona Diamondbacks, giving up two runs in an inning of relief. He finished his rookie season with a 9.00 ERA in 2 appearances with the team.

=== Kansas City Royals ===
On October 30, 2020, Sanabria was claimed off waivers by the Kansas City Royals. On December 1, Sanabria was designated for assignment by Kansas City. The following day, the Royals non-tendered Sanabria, making him a free agent. On December 12, Sanabria re-signed with the Royals organization on a minor league contract. He was assigned to the Double-A Northwest Arkansas Naturals to begin the 2021 season. Sanabria split the 2021 season with Double-A Northwest Arkansas and the Triple-A Omaha Storm Chasers, making 38 appearances. He went 5-0 with a 3.86 ERA and 59 strikeouts. Sanabria became a free agent following the season.

=== Detroit Tigers ===
On February 5, 2022, Sanabria signed a minor league contract with the Detroit Tigers. Sanabria did not play in a game in 2022, missing the year due to a rib injury and a personal matter. The Tigers released Sanabria on March 3, 2023.

=== Kansas City Monarchs ===
On March 6, 2023, Sanabria signed with the Kansas City Monarchs of the American Association of Professional Baseball. Sanabria appeared in 5 games for Kansas City, but struggled to a 13.50 ERA with 3 strikeouts in 5 1/3 innings of work. He was released by the team on May 30.

=== Gary SouthShore RailCats ===
On February 16, 2024, Sanabria signed with the Gary SouthShore RailCats of the American Association of Professional Baseball. In 28 games (14 starts) for Gary, he struggled to a 1–9 record and 6.39 ERA with 82 strikeouts across 81 2/3 innings pitched. He became a free agent following the season.
