= Wander (disambiguation) =

Wander refers to jitter frequences below 10 Hz.

Wander may also refer to:

- Wander AG, a Swiss food company
- Wander (given name)
- Wander (surname)
- Wander (film), a 2020 American film starring Aaron Eckhart
- Wander (1974 video game)
- Wander (2015 video game)
- Wander (Wander Over Yonder), a fictional character
- Wander, the protagonist of the 2005 PlayStation 2 video game Shadow of the Colossus, as well as its 2018 remake for the PlayStation 4

== See also ==
- Wanders
- Wanderer (disambiguation)
- Wandering (disambiguation)
- Wonder (disambiguation)
- Wanderlust (disambiguation)
