= Wander (surname) =

Wander is a surname, and may refer to:

- Art Wander (1927–2025), American radio personality
- Fred Wander (1917–2006), Austrian writer
- Georg Wander (1841–1897), German chemist
- Gurpreet Singh Wander, Indian cardiologist
- Joshua Wander (born 1970), Rabbi, Aliyah activist, international speaker
- Karl Friedrich Wilhelm Wander
- Maxie Wander (1933–1977), Austrian author
- Talles Wander (born 2003), Brazilian footballer
- Thomas Wander
