= 2021 American League Division Series =

Teams
Team (Wins)		Manager	Season
Boston Red Sox (3)		Alex Cora	92–70 (.568), GB: 8
Tampa Bay Rays (1)		Kevin Cash	100–62 (.617), GA: 8
- Dates: October 7–11
- Television: FS1 (Games 1–2, 4); MLB Network (Game 3)
- TV announcers: Joe Davis (FS1), Matt Vasgersian (MLBN), John Smoltz, and Ken Rosenthal
- Radio: ESPN
- Radio announcers: Dan Shulman and Xavier Scruggs
- Umpires: Dan Bellino, Greg Gibson, Sam Holbrook (crew chief), Brian Knight, Ron Kulpa, D.J. Reyburn

Teams
Team (Wins)		Manager	Season
Houston Astros (3)		Dusty Baker	95–67 (.586), GA: 5
Chicago White Sox (1)		Tony La Russa	93–69 (.574), GA: 13
- Dates: October 7–12
- Television: FS1 (Games 1, 3–4); MLB Network (Game 2)
- TV announcers: Adam Amin, A. J. Pierzynski, Adam Wainwright (Games 3 and 4), and Tom Verducci (FS1); Bob Costas, Jim Kaat, Buck Showalter and Tom Verducci (MLBN)
- Radio: ESPN
- Radio announcers: Kevin Brown and Chris Burke
- Umpires: Lance Barrett, Vic Carapazza, Chris Conroy, Chad Fairchild, Tom Hallion (crew chief), Adam Hamari
- ALWC: Boston Red Sox defeated New York Yankees, 6–2

The 2021 American League Division Series were the two best-of-five playoff series in Major League Baseball’s (MLB) 2021 postseason that determined the participating teams of the 2021 American League Championship Series. The three divisional winners, seeded first through third, and a fourth team—determined by the AL Wild Card Game—played in two series. These matchups were:

- (1) Tampa Bay Rays (AL East champions) vs. (4) Boston Red Sox (Wild Card Game winner): Red Sox won the series, 3–1.
- (2) Houston Astros (AL West champions) vs. (3) Chicago White Sox (AL Central champions): Astros won the series, 3–1.

The team with the better regular season record (higher seed) of each series hosted Games 1, 2, and (if necessary) 5, while the lower seeded team hosted Game 3 and (if necessary) 4.

Following the series, the Red Sox and Astros met in the 2021 American League Championship Series, with the Astros winning the series, 4 games to 2. The Astros would go on to lose the 2021 World Series to the National League champion Atlanta Braves, 4 games to 2.

== Background ==
Seeds one through three were determined by regular season winning percentages among division-winning teams (with any ties broken by head-to-head records). The final team was the winner of the American League Wild Card Game, played between the league's fourth and fifth seeded teams.

The Tampa Bay Rays clinched the American League East on September 26 and secured the AL's best record and home-field advantage throughout the AL postseason with a 100–62 record on September 28. It was Tampa's first 100-win season in franchise history. The Boston Red Sox defeated the New York Yankees in the Wild Card Game, 6–2, to advance to the ALDS. This was the third postseason matchup between the Red Sox and Rays. The previous meetings were the 2008 American League Championship Series (won by the Rays 4–3) and the 2013 American League Division Series (won by the Red Sox 3–1). The Rays won the season series with the Red Sox, 11–8.

The Houston Astros clinched the American League West on September 30 and secured the second-seed in the AL postseason with a 95–67 record. The Chicago White Sox clinched the American League Central on September 23, and secured the third-seed in the AL postseason with a 93–69 record. Houston won the season series over Chicago, 5–2. This was the first ever League Division Series that featured a World Series re-match; the White Sox swept the Astros in the 2005 World Series, when Houston was a member of the National League. This also makes it the first time ever this has occurred in the American League, and only the second time ever, the first being in the 2011 National League Championship Series, when the 1982 World Series opponents, the Milwaukee Brewers and the St. Louis Cardinals, played each other, after the Cardinals beat the Brewers in the latter series, 29 years earlier.

The Rays made their third straight postseason appearance, the Astros made their fifth straight appearance (and sixth in seven seasons), and this was the White Sox' second straight appearance. The Red Sox had last reached the postseason three seasons prior, when they won the 2018 World Series.

== Matchups ==
=== Tampa Bay Rays vs. Boston Red Sox ===
Boston won the series, 3–1.

Game	Date	Score	Location	Time	Attendance
1	October 7	Boston Red Sox – 0, Tampa Bay Rays – 5	Tropicana Field	3:06	27,419
2	October 8	Boston Red Sox – 14, Tampa Bay Rays – 6	Tropicana Field	3:56	37,616
3	October 10	Tampa Bay Rays – 4, Boston Red Sox – 6 (13)	Fenway Park	5:14	37,224
4	October 11	Tampa Bay Rays – 5, Boston Red Sox – 6	Fenway Park	3:25	38,447

=== Houston Astros vs. Chicago White Sox ===
Houston won the series, 3–1.

Game	Date	Score	Location	Time	Attendance
1	October 7	Chicago White Sox – 1, Houston Astros – 6	Minute Maid Park	3:34	40,497
2	October 8	Chicago White Sox – 4, Houston Astros – 9	Minute Maid Park	3:52	41,315
3	October 10	Houston Astros – 6, Chicago White Sox – 12	Guaranteed Rate Field	4:27	40,288
4	October 12	Houston Astros – 10, Chicago White Sox – 1	Guaranteed Rate Field	4:32	40,170

== Tampa Bay vs. Boston ==
The Rays won the season series with the Red Sox, 11–8. This was the third postseason meeting between the franchises. Their previous postseason meetings were in the 2008 ALCS, won by the Rays in seven games, and in the 2013 ALDS, won by the Red Sox in four games.

=== Game 1 ===
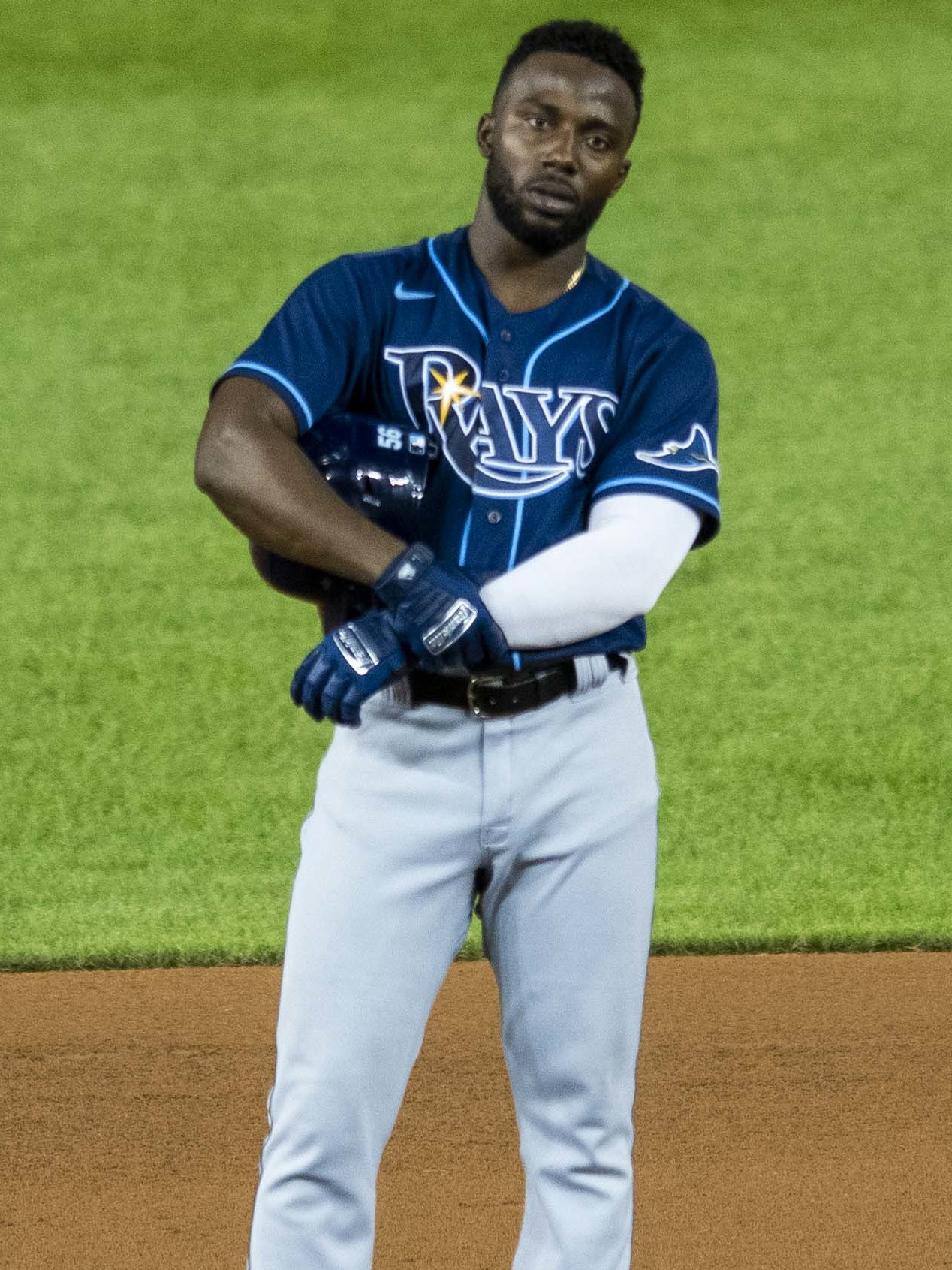
Randy Arozarena stole home for the Rays' final run in Game 1.

October 7, 2021 8:09 pm (EDT) at Tropicana Field in St. Petersburg, Florida 73 °F (23 °C), dome
Team	1	2	3	4	5	6	7	8	9	R	H	E
Boston	0	0	0	0	0	0	0	0	0	0	9	0
Tampa Bay	2	0	1	0	1	0	1	0	X	5	6	1
WP: Shane McClanahan (1–0) LP: Eduardo Rodríguez (0–1); Home runs: BOS: None; TB: Nelson Cruz (1), Randy Arozarena (1); Attendance: 27,419; Boxscore

Tampa Bay won the opening game of the series, 5–0. Boston starting pitcher Eduardo Rodríguez took the loss after allowing two runs on two hits and two walks in 1 2/3 innings. Tampa Bay's other three runs were charged to Nick Pivetta, who pitched 4 2/3 innings of relief. Randy Arozarena of the Rays walked against Pivetta in the seventh inning, advanced to third base on a double by Wander Franco, and then stole home against Josh Taylor, who had relieved Pivetta. With the steal, Arozarena became the first player in baseball history to hit a home run and steal home base at the same game during a playoff game. Tampa Bay starter Shane McClanahan earned the win, pitching five innings while allowing five hits, no walks, and striking out three batters. Arozarena and Nelson Cruz both homered for Tampa Bay; Cruz's home run was given after it ricocheted off one of the catwalks along the stadium roof. The Red Sox outhit the Rays, 9–6, but went 1-for-7 with runners in scoring position.

=== Game 2 ===
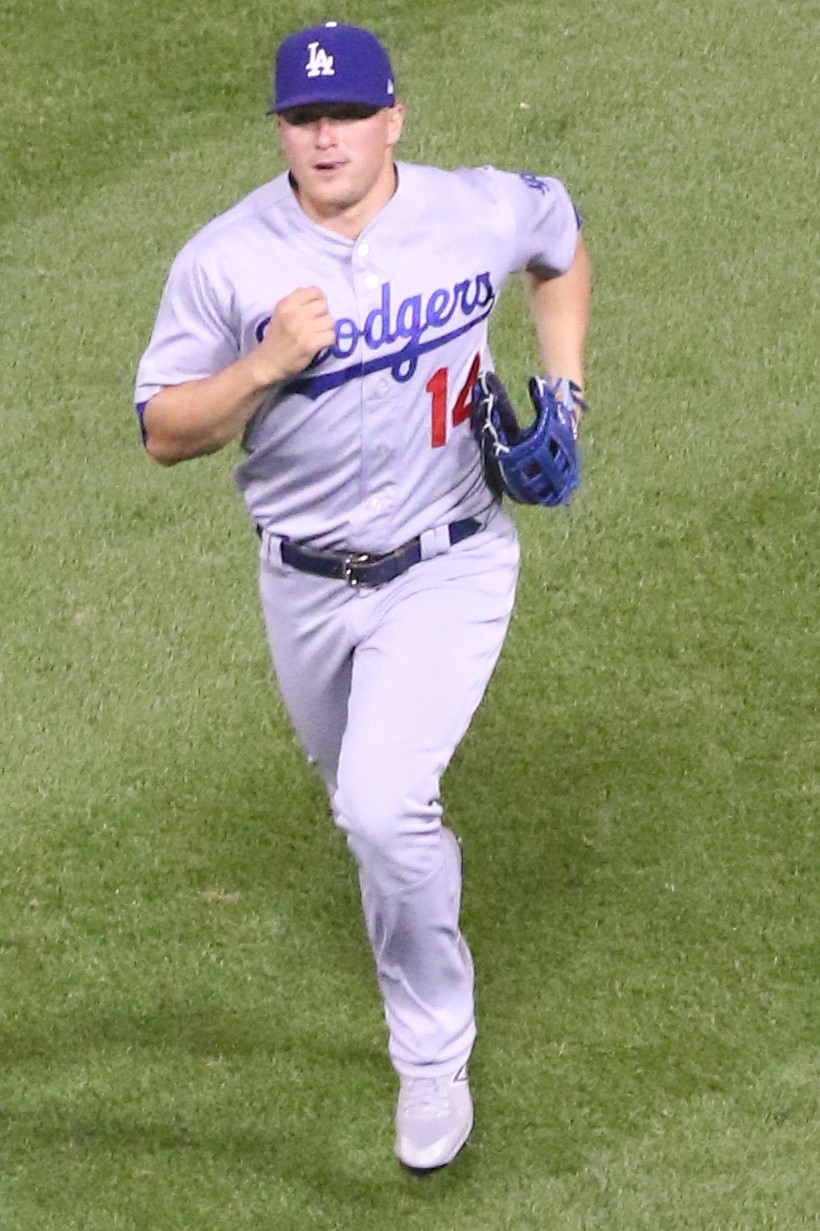
Kike Hernández, pictured with the Dodgers, had five hits and three RBIs for Boston in Game 2.

October 8, 2021 7:04 pm (EDT) at Tropicana Field in St. Petersburg, Florida 73 °F (23 °C), dome
Team	1	2	3	4	5	6	7	8	9	R	H	E
Boston	2	0	2	0	4	0	1	2	3	14	20	0
Tampa Bay	5	0	0	0	0	1	0	0	0	6	8	0
WP: Tanner Houck (1–0) LP: Collin McHugh (0–1); Home runs: BOS: Xander Bogaerts (1), Alex Verdugo (1), Kiké Hernández (1), J.D. Martinez (1), Rafael Devers (1); TB: Jordan Luplow (1), Ji-Man Choi (1); Attendance: 37,616; Boxscore

Boston evened the series at 1–1 with a 14–6 win in Game 2. After the Red Sox scored twice in the top of the first inning, the Rays scored five runs off of Chris Sale in the bottom of the inning, including a grand slam by Jordan Luplow. The Boston bullpen, led by five innings from Tanner Houck, allowed just one more run by Tampa Bay—a home run by Ji-man Choi—for the rest of the game. Meanwhile, the Red Sox scored 12 more runs and had five batters with three or more hits. Kiké Hernández had five hits including a home run and three doubles. Xander Bogaerts, Alex Verdugo, J. D. Martinez, and Rafael Devers also homered. Houck got the win in relief for Boston, while Tampa Bay reliever Collin McHugh, who allowed three runs on two hits and a walk in 1 2/3 innings, took the loss.

=== Game 3 ===
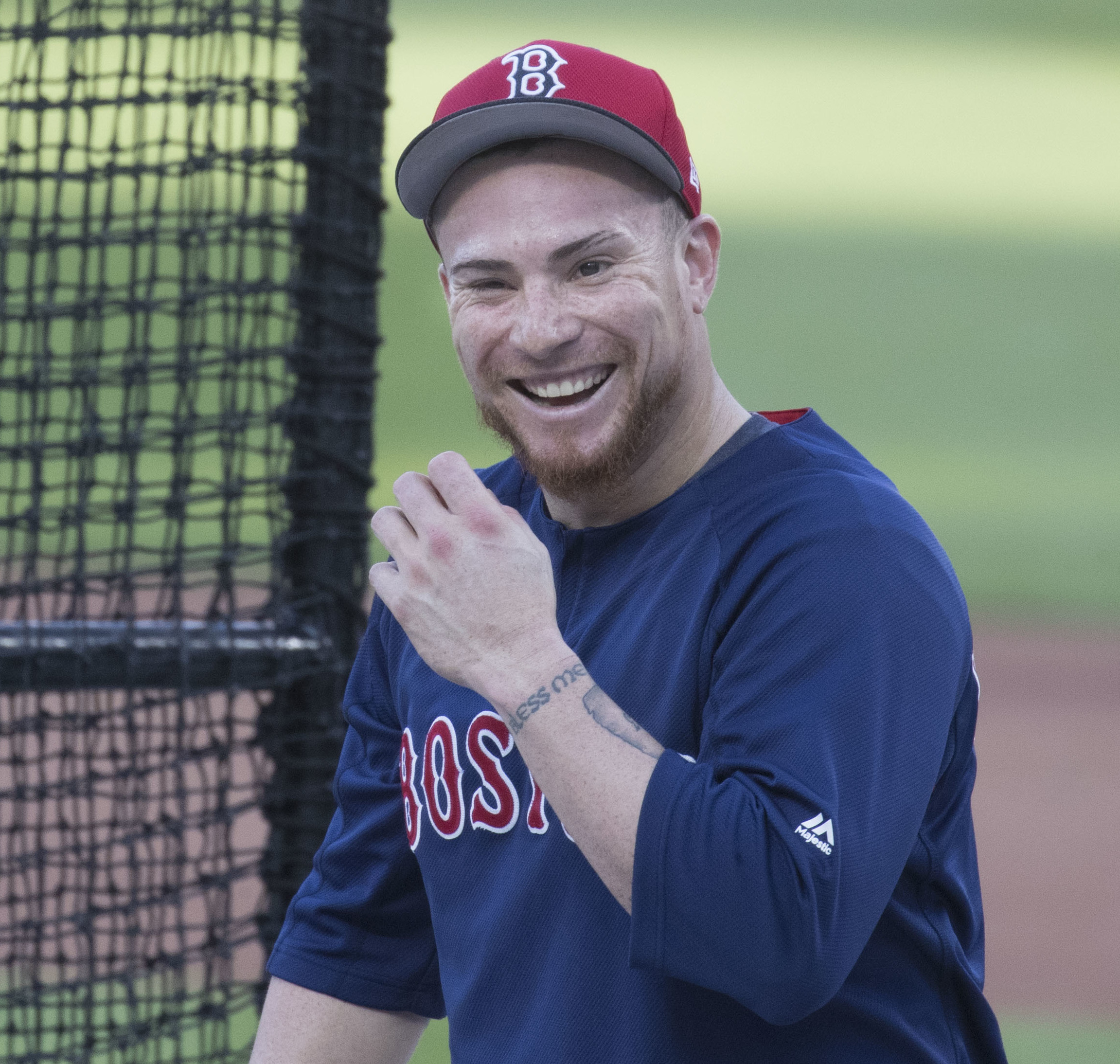
Christian Vázquez hit a walk-off home run in the 13th inning of Boston's Game 3 win.

October 10, 2021 4:09 pm (EDT) at Fenway Park in Boston, Massachusetts 64 °F (18 °C), overcast
Team	1	2	3	4	5	6	7	8	9	10	11	12	13	R	H	E
Tampa Bay	2	0	0	0	0	0	0	2	0	0	0	0	0	4	10	0
Boston	1	0	2	0	1	0	0	0	0	0	0	0	2	6	15	1
WP: Nick Pivetta (1–0) LP: Luis Patiño (0–1); Home runs: TB: Austin Meadows (1), Wander Franco (1); BOS: Kyle Schwarber (1), Kiké Hernández (2), Christian Vázquez (1); Attendance: 37,224; Boxscore

Boston took a 2–1 lead in the best-of-five series with a 6–4 win in a 13-inning contest, only the second postseason extra-inning game the Rays had ever played, and the second-longest AL postseason game ever (ALDS/ALCS). The Rays scored twice in the top of the first inning, via a two-run homer by Austin Meadows. The Red Sox got a run back in the bottom of the inning on a Kyle Schwarber solo homer. Boston went ahead, 3–2, on four consecutive singles that scored two runs in the bottom of the third, and extended the lead to 4–2 via a fifth-inning solo home run by Kiké Hernández. In the top of the eighth, Wander Franco homered and Randy Arozarena hit an RBI double, both off of Hansel Robles, as the Rays tied the game, 4–4.

After a scoreless ninth inning, the game went to extra innings. Nick Pivetta, expected to be Boston's starting pitcher in Game 4, came on in relief and held the Rays scoreless in the top of the tenth, while the Rays' David Robertson held Boston scoreless in the bottom of the inning. Both Pivetta and Robertson stayed in the game and pitched a scoreless 11th inning. Pivetta again held the Rays scoreless in the top of the 12th, while Luis Patiño held the Red Sox scoreless in the bottom of the inning. The final 13th inning proved to be a wild one. Pivetta pitched a fourth scoreless inning, which included a ground rule double by Kevin Kiermaier—the batted ball bounced off of the right field wall, the ground, and then off of Hunter Renfroe's hip into the bullpen—which otherwise would have resulted in a Rays run, as Yandy Díaz was running from first base when the ball was hit. Christian Vázquez ended the game with a two-run walk-off home run off of Patiño in the bottom of the 13th.

This is, to date, the final postseason game broadcast by MLB Network. Broadcast television network Fox would assume the broadcasting rights to MLB Network's slate of Division Series games beginning in 2022, joining sister network FS1 as part of Fox Sports' MLB broadcast package.

=== Game 4 ===
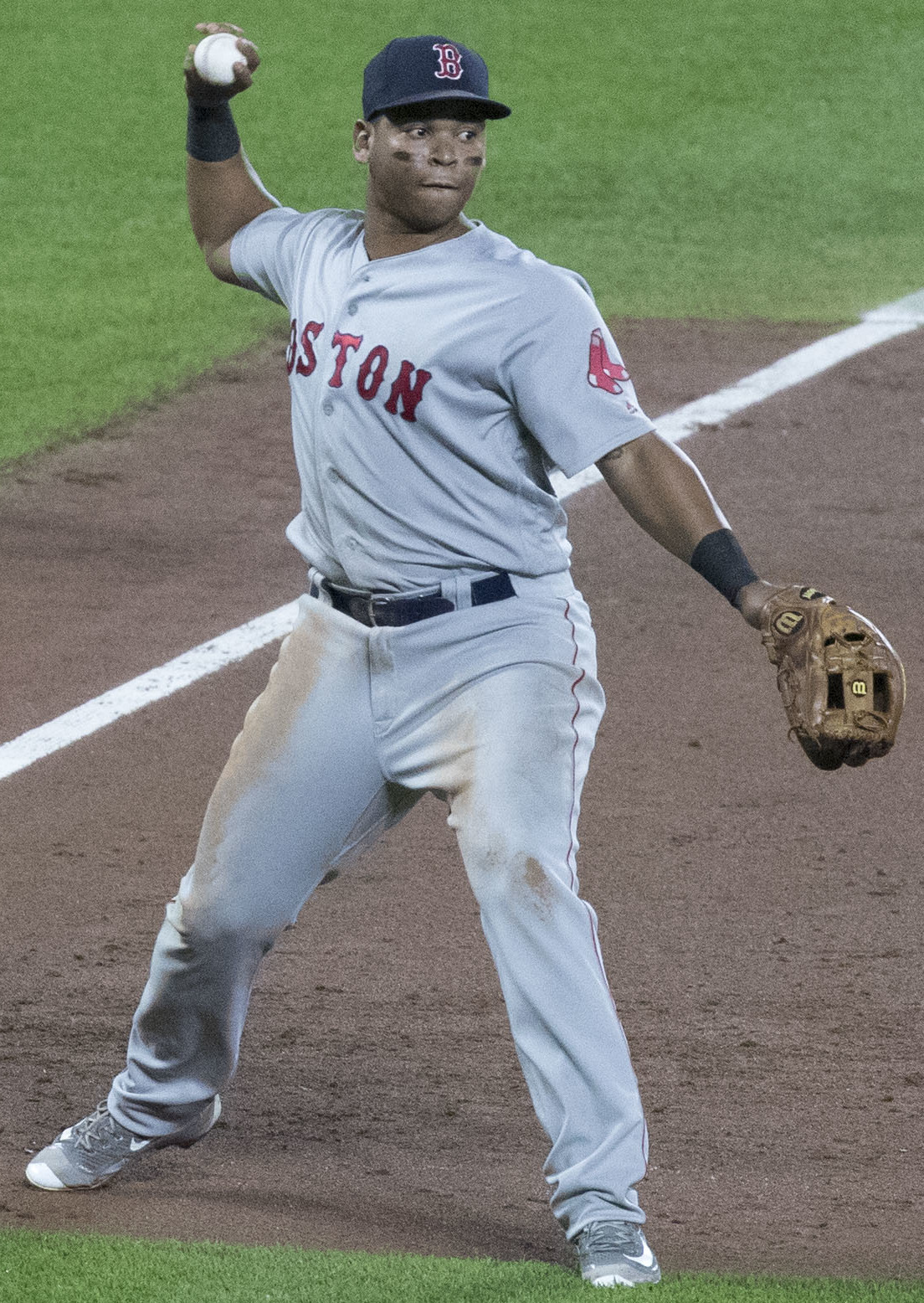
Rafael Devers went 3-for-4 with three RBIs in Game 4.

October 11, 2021 7:09 pm (EDT) at Fenway Park in Boston, Massachusetts 63 °F (17 °C), partly cloudy
Team	1	2	3	4	5	6	7	8	9	R	H	E
Tampa Bay	0	0	0	0	1	2	0	2	0	5	7	1
Boston	0	0	5	0	0	0	0	0	1	6	12	0
WP: Garrett Whitlock (1–0) LP: J. P. Feyereisen (0–1); Home runs: TB: Wander Franco (2); BOS: Rafael Devers (2); Attendance: 38,447; Boxscore

The Red Sox won Game 4, 6–5, to advance to the ALCS. Eduardo Rodríguez, who had lost Game 1 but only threw 41 pitches, started for Boston, while Collin McHugh, who had lost Game 2 in relief, started for Tampa Bay. After two scoreless innings, Boston scored five runs in the bottom of the third off Shane McClanahan, including a three-run homer by Rafael Devers. After all five runs were scored from Boston, Shane was then taken out after 2 2/3 innings in frustration, throwing his glove and smashing a chair inside the Rays' bullpen. The Rays got one run back in the top of the fifth. In the top of the sixth, a two-run homer by Wander Franco cut Boston's lead to 5–3. The Rays opened the eighth with three consecutive hits off of Ryan Brasier to tie the game, 5–5; Garrett Whitlock relieved Brasier and ended the rally. An outfield assist by Kevin Kiermaier cut down Alex Verdugo at third base to end a Red Sox threat in the bottom of the eighth. Whitlock then retired the Rays in order on seven pitches in the top of the ninth. Christian Vázquez led off the bottom of the ninth with a single against J. P. Feyereisen, he then reached second on Christian Arroyo's sacrifice bunt and a pinch-hit infield single by Travis Shaw moved him to third base. After the Red Sox put runners at second and third with one out in the bottom of the ninth, a sacrifice fly by Kiké Hernández pushed across the series-winning run.

=== Composite line score ===
2021 ALDS (3–1): Boston Red Sox beat Tampa Bay Rays

Team	1	2	3	4	5	6	7	8	9	10	11	12	13	R	H	E
Boston Red Sox	3	0	9	0	5	0	1	2	4	0	0	0	2	26	56	1
Tampa Bay Rays	9	0	1	0	2	3	1	4	0	0	0	0	0	20	31	2
Total attendance: 140,706 Average attendance: 35,177

== Houston vs. Chicago ==
The Astros won the season series with the White Sox, 5–2. This was the second postseason meeting between the franchises. Their previous postseason meeting was in the 2005 World Series, when the Astros were members of the National League, won by the White Sox in a four-game sweep.

This was the second time for a prior World Series matchup to occur in either a Wild Card Game, Division Series or League Championship Series. The first such instance was in the 2011 National League Championship Series, during which the St. Louis Cardinals defeated the Milwaukee Brewers, 4–2, in a rematch of the 1982 World Series. This was the first time in franchise history the White Sox have appeared in the postseason in consecutive seasons, while this was the fifth straight postseason appearance for the Astros.

As of the 2021 postseason, Tony La Russa (aged 77) and Dusty Baker (aged 72) were the oldest managers in MLB. Including their 2021 postseason appearances, La Russa and Joe Torre were tied for the second-most playoff appearances as managers, with 15, while Baker was next on the list with 11. The only prior time Baker's and La Russa's teams faced each other in the postseason was in the 2002 National League Championship Series, when Baker's Giants defeated La Russa's Cardinals in five games.

Despite their lone postseason match-up, Baker and La Russa share a long history, having known each other for 50 years. As La Russa was winding down his playing career, he spent a season in Atlanta where a young Baker was just starting his playing career with the 1971 Braves. The two men also spent a season together on the 1986 Athletics, when Baker was ending his playing career and La Russa was on his second managerial job. As managers, Baker and La Russa both competed in the NL Central from 2003 to 2006 and again from 2008 to 2011. In 2014, when each manager was out of the game for a time, they made peace with each other upon conversations spent with Dave Stewart, who worked for both managers as a player, manager, and general manager.

=== Game 1 ===
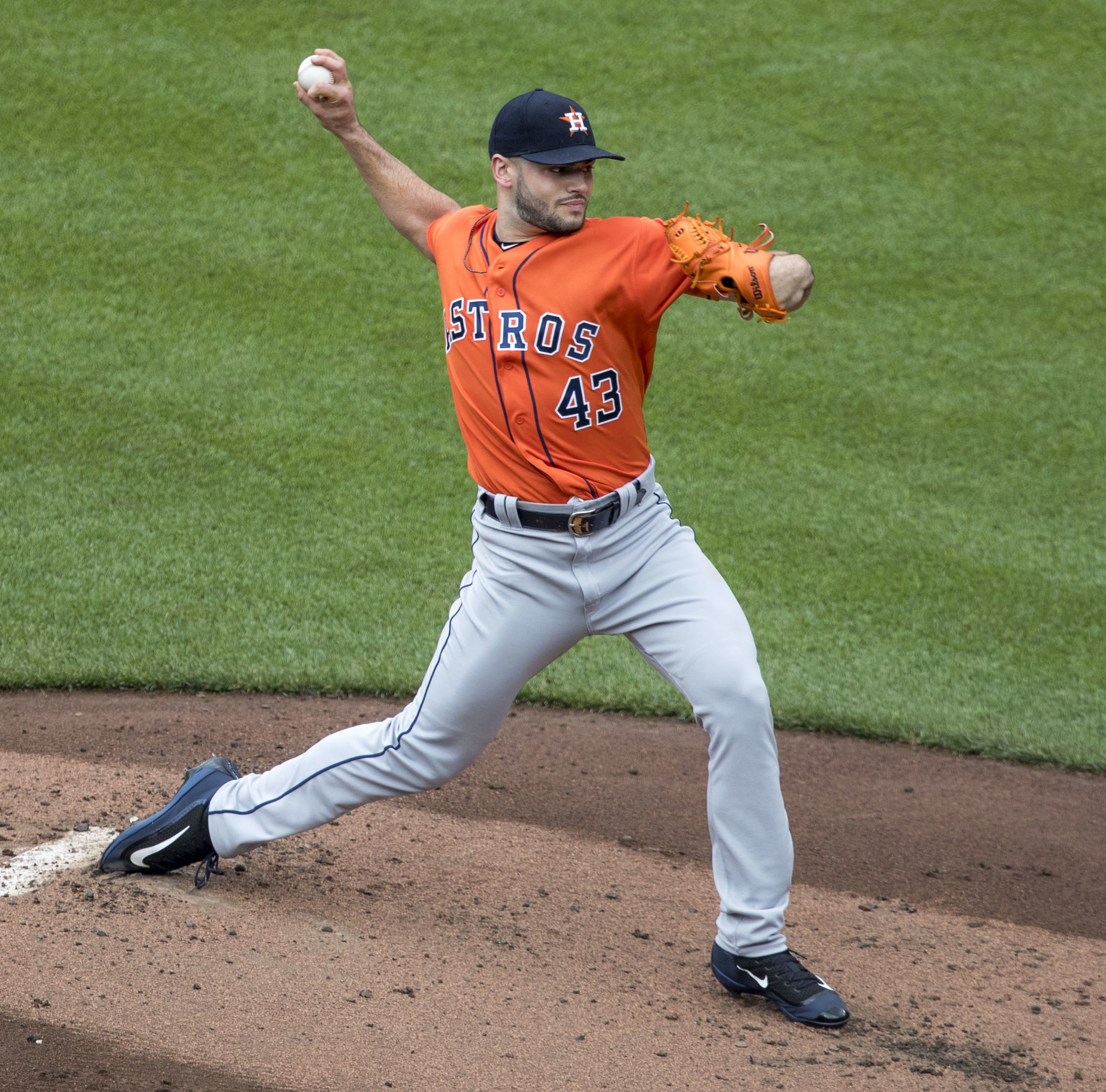
Lance McCullers Jr. was the winning pitcher in Game 1.

October 7, 2021 3:09 pm (CDT) at Minute Maid Park in Houston, Texas 73 °F (23 °C), roof closed
Team	1	2	3	4	5	6	7	8	9	R	H	E
Chicago	0	0	0	0	0	0	0	1	0	1	7	0
Houston	0	1	2	2	1	0	0	0	X	6	10	1
WP: Lance McCullers Jr. (1–0) LP: Lance Lynn (0–1); Home runs: CWS: None; HOU: Yordan Alvarez (1); Attendance: 40,497; Boxscore

Amidst a plethora of fastballs from Lance Lynn (who threw the highest rate of them since pitches have been tracked in 2008) against a team that batted the best against the pitch, the Astros rocked five runs off Lynn before he left in the fourth inning, starting on an RBI single from rookie Jake Meyers. Alex Bregman drove in what turned out to be the go-ahead run on a fielder's choice that scored Jose Altuve, who slid just by the catcher's foot and tag. Lance McCullers Jr. pitched his first game of the 2021 season without a walk, going 6 2/3 innings with four hits and zero runs (becoming the first Astro with six scoreless innings and no walks since Brandon Backe in 2005). Yordan Alvarez went 2-for-3 while driving in two runs, which included a home run.

=== Game 2 ===
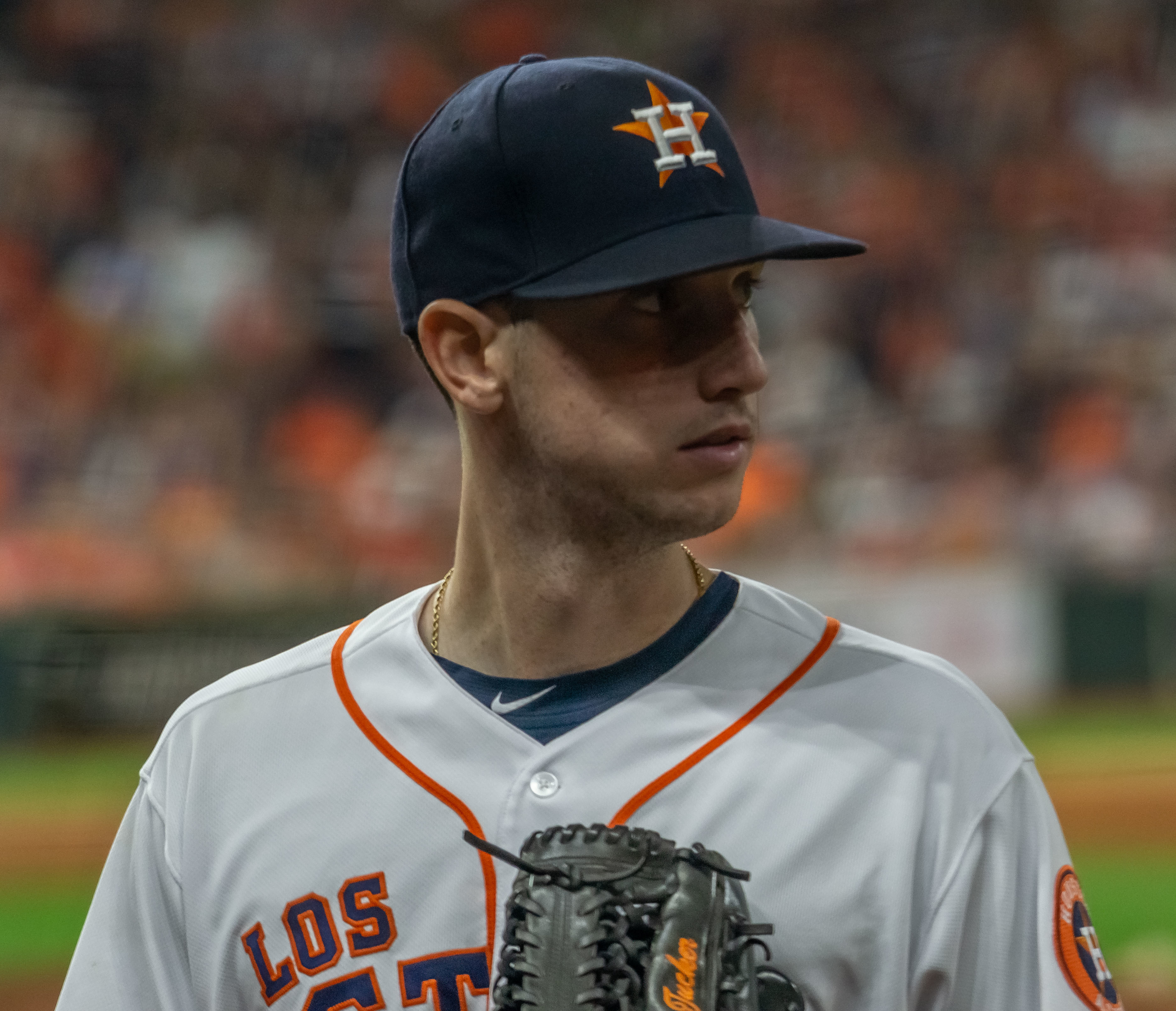
Kyle Tucker hit the only home run of Game 2.

October 8, 2021 1:09 pm (CDT) at Minute Maid Park in Houston, Texas 73 °F (23 °C), roof closed
Team	1	2	3	4	5	6	7	8	9	R	H	E
Chicago	1	0	0	0	3	0	0	0	0	4	11	0
Houston	0	2	0	0	2	0	5	0	X	9	10	0
WP: Ryne Stanek (1–0) LP: Aaron Bummer (0–1); Home runs: CWS: None; HOU: Kyle Tucker (1); Attendance: 41,315; Boxscore

Framber Valdez was matched against Lucas Giolito. Each pitcher would fail to reach the fifth inning. The Astros rallied for five runs in the seventh inning when eight batters went to the plate, with Yordan Alvarez hitting a liner past second base to break the 4–4 tie. With two outs, Carlos Correa then lined a ball past right fielder Leury Garcia for a two-run double and Kyle Tucker capped the game with a home run.

With the Astros win, it marked the fifth consecutive Division Series in which they won the first two games, a feat matched by no team in the past 25 years. Dubiously, the White Sox became the first team in Major League history with at least 15 hits with none for extra bases in the first two games of a postseason, having accrued 18 singles.

=== Game 3 ===
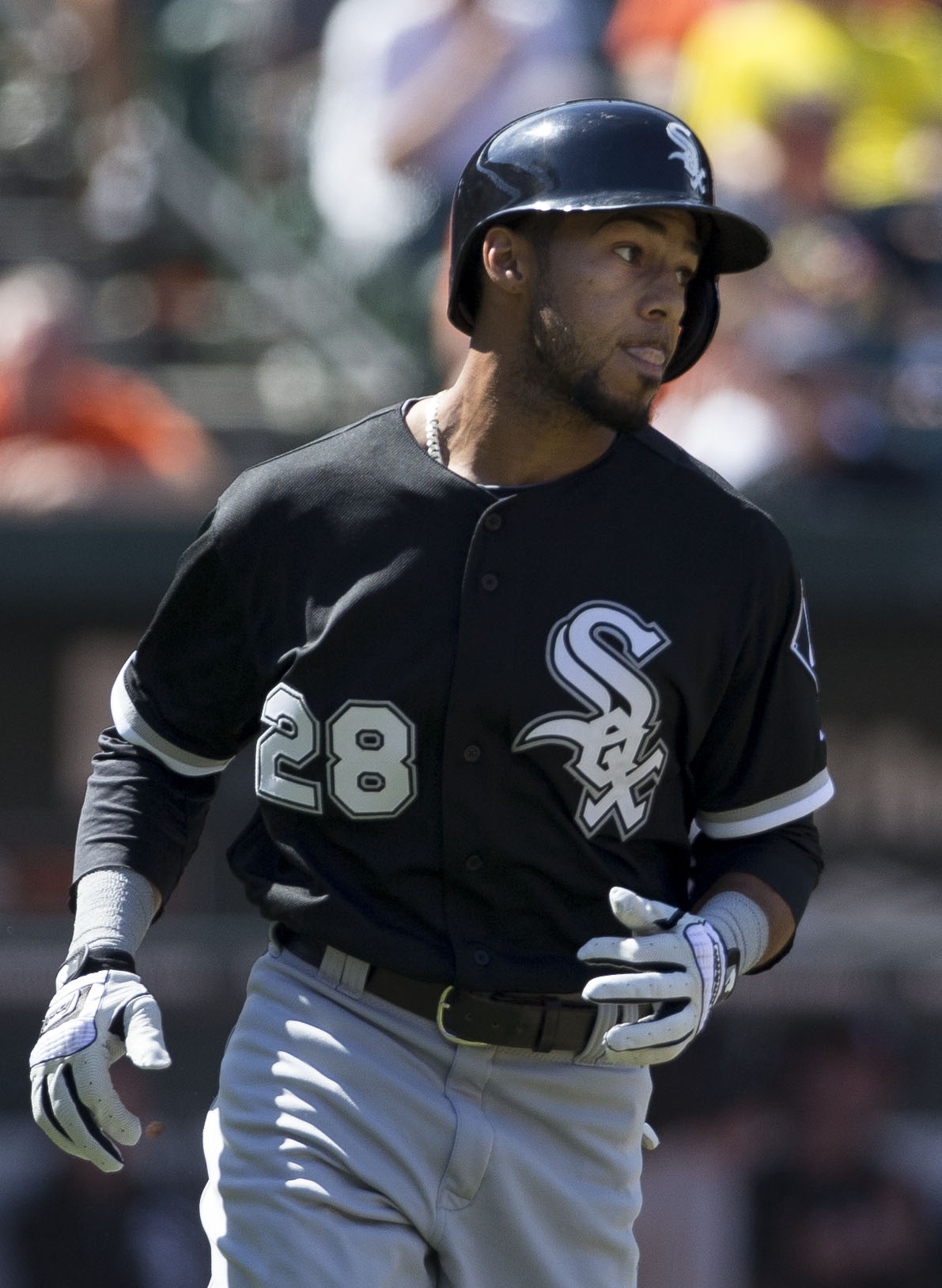
Leury García hit a 3-run home run in Game 3.

October 10, 2021 7:07 pm (CDT) at Guaranteed Rate Field in Chicago, Illinois 75 °F (24 °C), mostly cloudy
Team	1	2	3	4	5	6	7	8	9	R	H	E
Houston	0	3	2	1	0	0	0	0	0	6	6	1
Chicago	1	0	5	3	0	0	0	3	X	12	16	0
WP: Michael Kopech (1–0) LP: Yimi García (0–1); Home runs: HOU: Kyle Tucker (2); CWS: Yasmani Grandal (1), Leury Garcia (1); Attendance: 40,288; Boxscore

The White Sox won Game 3, 12–6, to avoid elimination. Both starting pitchers, Luis García for Houston and Dylan Cease for Chicago, exited before the end of the third inning, having allowed five runs and three runs, respectively. Houston had a 5–1 lead in the middle of the third inning, but Chicago scored five in the bottom of the inning to take the lead. The Astros tied the game, 6–6, in the top of the fourth, which the White Sox answered with three runs for a 9–6 lead. The only other scoring in the game was three runs by Chicago in the bottom of the eighth, for the 12–6 final. The White Sox outhit the Astros, 16–6, led by Tim Anderson who had three hits; Leury García had a home run and four RBIs, while Yasmani Grandal also homered and had three RBIs. Kyle Tucker homered for the Astros, his second of the series.

=== Game 4 ===
Game 4 was originally scheduled for October 11, but was postponed a day due to rain.

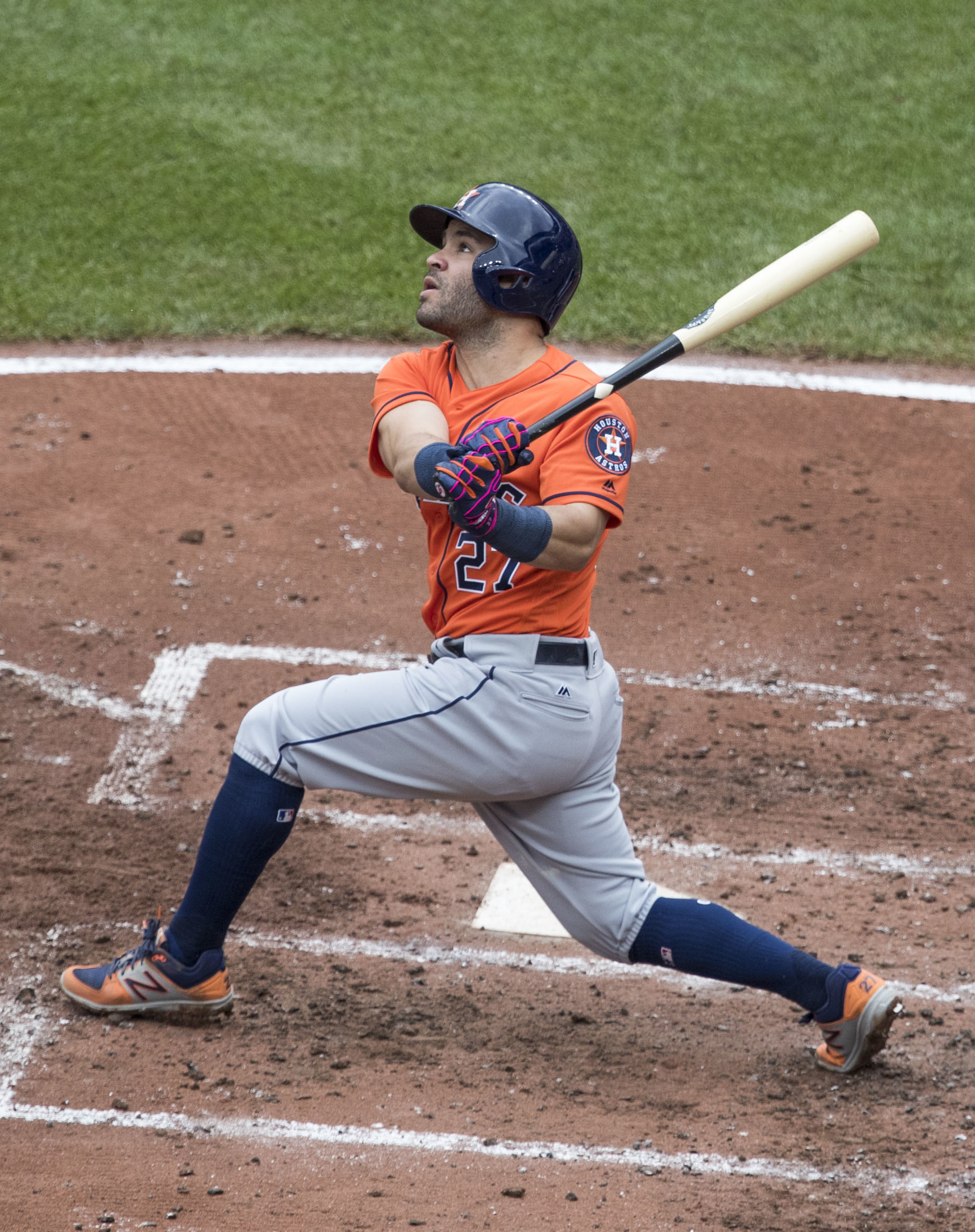
Jose Altuve hit a 3-run home run to close out Game 4.

October 12, 2021 1:08 pm (CDT) at Guaranteed Rate Field in Chicago, Illinois 63 °F (17 °C), overcast
Team	1	2	3	4	5	6	7	8	9	R	H	E
Houston	0	0	2	3	0	1	0	1	3	10	14	0
Chicago	0	1	0	0	0	0	0	0	0	1	7	1
WP: Yimi García (1–1) LP: Carlos Rodón (0–1); Home runs: HOU: Jose Altuve (1); CWS: Gavin Sheets (1); Attendance: 40,170; Boxscore

After being postponed by inclement weather the day before, Lance McCullers Jr. was tabbed as the starter for Houston while Carlos Rodón was the Game 4 starter for the White Sox attempting to save their season and force a Game 5 in Houston the next day. Rodón looked sharp early, breezing through the first two innings on 26 pitches. Gavin Sheets homered in the bottom of the second to start the scoring, but the Astros would answer right back in the top of the third with a Carlos Correa bases-loaded double to bring it 2–1 and knocking Rodón out of the game. The Astros never looked back as they added on in the top of the fourth with an RBI single from Martin Maldonado and an RBI double from Alex Bregman to make it 5–1. McCullers got out of a jam in the bottom of the inning by striking out César Hernández looking. The White Sox would not have a runner in scoring position for the rest of the game. McCullers would be replaced by Yimi Garcia in the fifth due to forearm tightness. Michael Brantley added two insurance runs with RBI singles in the sixth and eighth innings before Jose Altuve capped off the day with a three-run homer in the top of the ninth. Ryan Pressly got Hernández to ground out and send the Astros to their fifth straight ALCS appearance. The Astros became the first team since the 1995–1999 Atlanta Braves, and only the third team in MLB history, to make five straight LCS appearances, the first being the 1971–1975 Oakland Athletics.

Altuve's home run in the ninth tied him with George Springer for the most career postseason home runs in Astros history, and moved him up to a tie for fourth place on the all-time leader board with Springer and Albert Pujols, with 19. The nine-run victory was the largest winning margin ever recorded by a team in a clinching game of the American League Division Series. With starts by Altuve, Bregman, Correa, and Yuli Gurriel, they played their 60th postseason game together, the most by a quartet of teammates in major league history.

=== Composite line score ===
2021 ALDS (3–1): Houston Astros beat Chicago White Sox

Team	1	2	3	4	5	6	7	8	9	R	H	E
Chicago White Sox	2	1	5	3	3	0	0	4	0	18	41	1
Houston Astros	0	6	6	6	3	1	5	1	3	31	40	2
Total attendance: 162,270 Average attendance: 40,568

== See also ==
- 2021 National League Division Series
- Rays–Red Sox rivalry
