= Wander (given name) =

Wander is a given name. Notable people with the name include:

- Wander dos Santos Machado (born 1976), Brazilian footballer
- Wander Franco (born 2001), Dominican baseball player
- Wander Gross (born 1978), Aruban footballer
- Wander Johannes de Haas (1878–1960), Dutch physicist and mathematician
- Wander Lowie (born 1959), Dutch linguist
- Wander Luiz Queiroz Dias (born 1992), Brazilian footballer
- Wander Luiz Bitencourt Junior (born 1987), Brazilian footballer
- Wander Mateo (born 1989), Dominican judoka
- Wander Moura (born 1969), Brazilian runner
- Wander Suero (born 1991), Dominican baseball player

== See also ==
- Wander (disambiguation)
