= Wanderlust (disambiguation) =

Wanderlust is a strong desire for or impulse to wander or travel and explore the world.

Wanderlust may also refer to:

== Film and television ==
- Wanderlust (2006 film), a documentary
- Wanderlust (2012 film), an American comedy starring Jennifer Aniston and Paul Rudd
- Wanderlust (Irish TV series), an Irish television show hosted by Brendan Courtney
- Wanderlust (British TV series), a BBC One/Netflix TV series starring Toni Collette
- Gerhard Reinke's Wanderlust, a television show

== Music ==
- Wanderlust (American band), an American power pop band in the mid-1990s
- Wanderlust (jazz band), an Australian contemporary jazz band

=== Songs ===
- "Wanderlust" (Björk song), by Björk from the 2007 album Volta
- "Wanderlust" (Paul McCartney song), by Paul McCartney from the 1982 album Tug of War
- "Wanderlust" (R.E.M. song), by R.E.M. from the 2004 album Around the Sun
- "Wanderlust" (The Weeknd song), by The Weeknd from the 2013 album Kiss Land
- "Wanderlust", by Johnny Hodges and Duke Ellington from the 1963 album Duke Ellington Meets Coleman Hawkins
- "Wanderlust", by Claire Voyant from the 1995 album Claire Voyant
- "Wanderlust", by David Sylvian from the 1999 album Dead Bees on a Cake
- "Wanderlust", by Megadeth from the 1999 album Risk
- "Wanderlust", by Nightwish from the 2000 album Wishmaster
- "Wanderlust", by Mark Knopfler from the 2000 album Sailing to Philadelphia
- "Wanderlust", by Delays from the 2004 album Faded Seaside Glamour
- "Wanderlust", by Flogging Molly from the 2004 album Within a Mile of Home
- "Wanderlust", by Fozzy from the 2005 album All That Remains
- "Wanderlust", by Frank Black from the 2006 album Fast Man Raider Man
- "Wanderlust", by Baroness from the 2007 album Red Album
- "Wanderlust", by Every Time I Die from the 2009 album New Junk Aesthetic
- "Wanderlust", by The Upwelling from the 2009 album An American Stranger
- "Wanderlust", by Frank Turner, a bonus track from the 2011 album England Keep My Bones
- "The Wanderlust", by Metric from the 2012 album Synthetica, featuring Lou Reed
- "Wanderlust II", by the Scottish band Love and Money
- "Wanderlust", by Polly Scattergood released both as a single and on the 2013 album Arrows
- "Wanderlust", by Wild Beasts from the 2014 album Present Tense
- "Wanderlust", by Blackbear from the 2016 EP Cashmere Noose
- "Wanderlust", by James Bay from the 2018 album Electric Light
- "Wanderlust", by FKA Twigs from the 2025 album Eusexua

=== Albums ===
- Wanderlust (Frankie Laine album), a 1963 album by Frankie Laine
- Wanderlust (Bill Leverty album), a 2004 album by FireHouse guitarist Bill Leverty
- Wanderlust (Gavin Rossdale album), a 2008 album by Gavin Rossdale
- Wanderlust (Finnr's Cane album), a 2010 album by Finnr's Cane
- Wanderlust (Mike Bukovsky album), a 1993 album by Mike Bukovsky
- Wanderlust (Sophie Ellis-Bextor album), a 2014 album by Sophie Ellis-Bextor
- Wanderlust (Little Big Town album), a 2016 album by Little Big Town
- Wanderlust (Blancmange album), a 2018 album by Blancmange

== Literature ==
- Wanderlust (Steel novel), a 1986 romantic novel by Danielle Steel
- Wanderlust (Dragonlance novel), a fantasy novel set in the Dragonlance universe
- Wanderlust: A History of Walking, a 2002 book by Rebecca Solnit

== Video games ==
- Wanderlust Interactive, a video game developer and publisher that made The Pink Panther: Passport to Peril
- Wanderlust: Rebirth, a video game published by Chucklefish
- Wanderlust Adventures, a sequel to Wanderlust: Rebirth, also published by Chucklefish
- Wanderlust Travel Stories, a 2019 adventure game
- Wanderlust, a character from Just Dance 2023 Edition

== Other ==
- Wanderlust (magazine), a UK-based travel magazine and website offering travel advice and inspiration
- USS Wanderlust, a United States Navy patrol vessel in commission from 1917 to 1919
- Wanderlust, a cream ale made by Pete's Brewing Company
- Wanderlust Festival, a summer festival featuring yoga and leading rock musicians

== See also ==
- Wonderlust, a 2000 album by Heather Nova
