= The Upwelling =

American band

- Origin: Queens, New York
- Genres: Indie rock
- Years active: 2005 - Present
- Labels: Edmond Records
- Members: Ari Ingber; Josh Ingber; Mike 'Showtime' Mulieri
- Past members: Scott Morley; Lee Moretti; Jim Kost; Conor Heffernan
- Website: Official Website

The Upwelling is a band with roots in the New York City, Washington, D.C., and Boston areas that currently resides in Queens. The band was founded by and originally consisted of brothers Ari and Josh Ingber on guitar and drums respectively. Their self-recorded, self-titled EP achieved the rare feat of finding distribution without being released by a label, partly due to its "Recommended" status by the Virgin Megastore—the first time the retail chain awarded such an honor to an unsigned band or an EP. Without an agency or a label, the band won Karma Production's Ireland tour, a Sonic Bid's contest.

They also drew attention from their peers: In 2005, Third Eye Blind's Stephan Jenkins heard a copy of the band's 2005 EP and began taking the band on the road. The All American Rejects heard about the band through a sound-engineer named Teresa Murray, a tour-manager named Shaba, and guitarist John Lamacia, of Candiria. The Rejects invited the band out on their first tour of the U.K. in 2006. During that year, they were also able to advance to the final rounds of Spin Magazine’s Band of the Year competition. The band has appeared at the CMJ Music Marathon and SXSW music festivals and played shows with Metric, The Wrens, The Stills, Motion City Soundtrack, Ben Kweller, We Are Scientists, T.I., Daughtry, Mat Kearney, Towers of London, Ambulance LTD., Shiny Toy Guns, All American Rejects, Hoobastank, VHS or Beta, Robbers on High Street, Ace Enders, The Fall, Third Eye Blind, Matt Nathanson, and American Steel.

In September 2007, the band was signed by Tyson Ritter and Mike Kennerty (The All American Rejects) to their label, Edmond Records (an imprint in partnership with Doghouse Records and Warner Bros.). The Upwelling's debut CD An American Stranger was released August 25, 2009. Soon after they added Mike "Show Time" Mulieri (Bass) to their lineup.

== Discography ==
- The Upwelling EP (2004)
- An American Stranger (2009)
