= Isostar =

Swiss-origin sports nutrition brand

- Product type: Sports drinks and sports nutrition products
- Current owner: Nutrition & Santé (Otsuka Pharmaceutical)
- Country: Switzerland
- Introduced: 1977; 49 years ago
- Markets: Europe
- Website: isostar.com

Isostar is a sports nutrition brand originating in Switzerland in 1977, best known for its isotonic drinks. Its product range includes sports drinks, energy bars, gels and protein products. Originally developed by Wander AG, the brand is now part of the French food company Nutrition & Santé, a subsidiary of the Japanese company Otsuka Pharmaceutical. Wander continues to manufacture and market Isostar products in Switzerland.

== History ==
Isostar was introduced in Switzerland in 1977 as an isotonic sports drink developed by Wander AG. Its original product, later known as Hydrate & Perform, was a powdered drink intended to be mixed with water. During the 1980s, the brand expanded into solid sports nutrition products, including energy bars.

Isostar subsequently became part of Novartis's food and nutrition business. When Novartis sold Wander AG to Associated British Foods in 2002, Isostar remained under Novartis Consumer Health as part of its Nutrition & Santé division. Wander continued to manufacture, distribute and market the brand's products in Switzerland.

In February 2006, Novartis sold Nutrition & Santé to investment funds managed by ABN AMRO Capital France. The business was subsequently acquired by Otsuka Pharmaceutical in February 2009, bringing Isostar under Japanese ownership. Wander AG, itself a subsidiary of Associated British Foods, has continued to produce and market Isostar products in Switzerland.

== Products ==
Isostar produces a range of sports nutrition products intended for consumption before, during and after physical activity. Its main product line, Hydrate & Perform, consists of isotonic drinks containing carbohydrates and electrolytes. The drinks are available in several formats, including ready-to-drink bottles, powdered mixes and effervescent tablets marketed as Powertabs.

The brand also markets energy bars, energy gels and protein products intended for sports nutrition and post-exercise recovery.

The composition varies by product and formulation. According to the company, its powdered drinks are manufactured in Switzerland, while its energy bars and gels are produced in France.

== Isotonic drink composition ==
The ingredients and nutritional composition of Isostar drinks vary by product and formulation. The orange-flavoured Hydrate & Perform isotonic drink powder contains carbohydrates (sucrose, glucose syrup and maltodextrin), an acidity regulator (citric acid), sodium citrate, calcium phosphate, sodium chloride, magnesium carbonate, natural flavourings, vitamin C and thiamine (vitamin B1). The product may contain traces of milk, barley and soy.

Isostar Hydrate & Perform Orange (powder)
Nutritional value per 100 g (3.5 oz)
- Energy: 1,587 kJ (379 kcal)
- Carbohydrates: 88 g
- Sugars: 70 g
- Fat: 0 g
- Protein: 0 g
Vitamins and minerals
Vitamins	Quantity %DV^{†}
Thiamine (B1)	48% 0.58 mg
Vitamin C	111% 100 mg
Minerals	Quantity %DV^{†}
Calcium	31% 400 mg
Magnesium	37% 155 mg
- Values per 100 g of powder. A 40 g serving is mixed with 500 mL of water.
- ^{†}Percentages estimated using US recommendations for adults.

== Sports sponsorship ==
Isostar has been involved in sports sponsorship, particularly in endurance sports and international competitions. In 1990, the brand began a partnership with the IIHF World Championship, serving as an official sponsor of the annual ice hockey tournament. The partnership reached its 25th year in 2014.

The brand has also been associated with the Tour de France and the French Handisport Federation. In 2026, Isostar launched a marketing campaign centred on amateur triathlon participants, as part of efforts to strengthen its presence in endurance sports.
