= Leury García =

Dominican baseball player (born 1991)

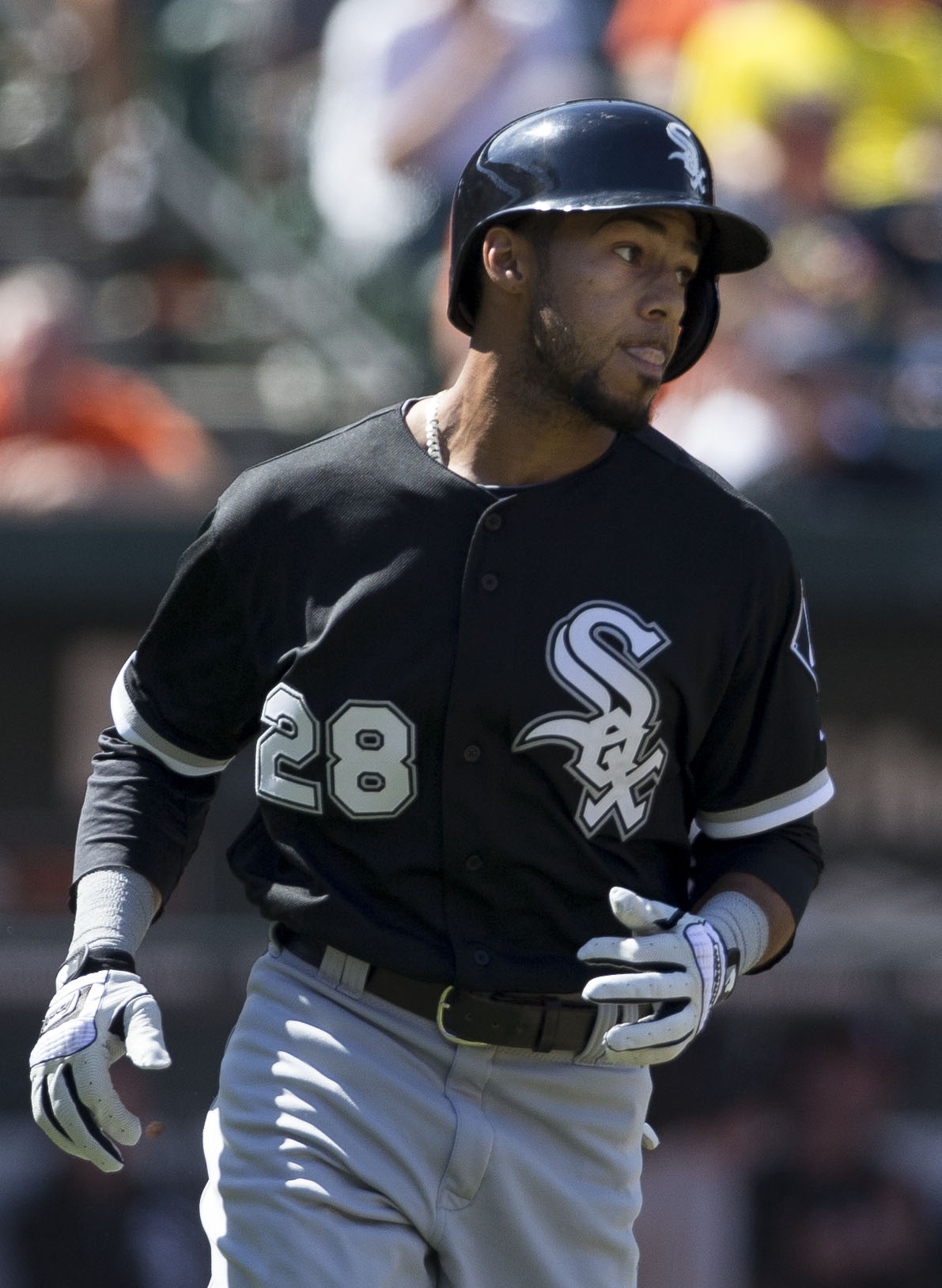
- García with the Chicago White Sox

Gigantes del Cibao – No. 1
- Utility player
- Born: March 18, 1991 (age 35); Santiago, Dominican Republic
- Bats: Switch Throws: Right

MLB debut
- April 6, 2013, for the Texas Rangers

MLB statistics (through 2022 season)
- Batting average: .253
- Home runs: 34
- Runs batted in: 201
- Stats at Baseball Reference

Teams
- Texas Rangers (2013); Chicago White Sox (2013–2022)
Medals
Men's baseball
Representing Dominican Republic
World Baseball Classic
Gold medal – first place	2013 San Francisco	Team

Leury García (born March 18, 1991) is a Dominican professional baseball utility player who captains the Gigantes del Cibao of the Dominican Professional Baseball League. He has previously played in Major League Baseball (MLB) for the Texas Rangers and Chicago White Sox. While primarily used as an infielder and center fielder, Garcia has experience at every position except catcher and first base.

== Career ==
=== Texas Rangers ===
==== Minor leagues ====
The Texas Rangers signed García as an international free agent in December 2007 after he participated in tryouts in the Dominican Republic. He played in the Rookie-level Arizona League for the Arizona League Rangers in 2008.

Garcia played for the Hickory Crawdads of the Single–A South Atlantic League in 2009 and 2010, stealing 47 bases in 56 attempts during the 2010 season. He was promoted to the Myrtle Beach Pelicans of the High–A Carolina League in 2011. He was voted the Carolina League Player of the Month for June 2011, in which he batted 38-for-111 (.342 batting average), leading the league with 22 runs, 38 hits, 51 total bases, and 10 stolen bases. He was assigned to play for the Frisco RoughRiders of the Double–A Texas League for the 2012 season. After batting .292 with 12 doubles, 11 triples, two home runs, 30 runs batted in, and 31 stolen bases in 100 games for Frisco, the Rangers added García to their 40-man roster after the 2012 season to protect him from being selected by another team in the Rule 5 draft.

==== Major leagues ====
García played for the Dominican Republic national baseball team in the 2013 World Baseball Classic. He spent most games not playing, but observing veteran shortstops Miguel Tejada and Jose Reyes. He made the Rangers' Opening Day roster for the 2013 season as a utility infielder. He made his major league debut on April 6 as a pinch hitter for Lance Berkman, striking out in his first at-bat. He was optioned to the Triple-A Round Rock Express on June 14, 2013, when Ian Kinsler returned from the disabled list.

=== Chicago White Sox ===
On August 11, 2013, the Rangers traded García to the Chicago White Sox as the player to be named later in the trade that sent Alex Ríos to Texas. He was then optioned to the Triple-A Charlotte Knights. The White Sox promoted García on August 22. In 20 games with Chicago in 2013, he hit .204 with 1 RBI and 6 SB.

With both Gordon Beckham and Jeff Keppinger injured to begin the season, García made the Opening Day roster in 2014. On April 16, García made his first career appearance on the mound, working the 14th inning in a game against Boston. He gave up 2 runs on 2 walks and a double, picking up the loss. On June 4, García hit his first major-league home run, a go-ahead solo shot off of Dodgers starter Josh Beckett. On July 2, 2014, García got his first walk-off hit with a pinch hit single off of Los Angeles Angels pitcher Mike Morin to win the game for the White Sox 3–2. In 74 games for Chicago, García slashed .166/.192/.207 with 6 home runs and 11 RBI.

García played sparingly with the White Sox in 2015 and 2016, appearing in 18 games each season while spending the majority of his time with the Triple-A Charlotte Knights. He returned to regular action for Chicago in 2017, playing in 87 games and batting a respectable .270/.316/.423 with 9 home runs, 33 RBI, and 8 stolen bases. In 2018, made 82 appearances for the team, hitting .271/.303/.376 with 4 home runs, 32 RBI, and 12 stolen bases.

In 2019 he batted .279/.310/.378 in a career-high 140 games played, and led the American League in ground ball percentage (54.9%), while having the lowest fly ball percentage in the AL (23.6%). He also led the American League with 11 sacrifice hits.

García appeared in 16 games in 2020 before he injured his left thumb after he attempted to beat a throw to first base with a headfirst slide in a game against the Detroit Tigers that required surgery ending his 2020 regular season. He was able to return in time for the postseason. He made his postseason debut in game 1 of the Wild Card Series against the Oakland Athletics.

On September 12, 2021, García hit a walk-off home run off of Boston Red Sox pitcher Garrett Whitlock to win the game for the White Sox 2–1. After collecting his first postseason hit on October 8, García hit his first postseason home run off of Yimi García two days later to take a 6–5 lead over the Houston Astros in Game 3 of the American League Division Series. The White Sox won the game 12–6 to force a Game 4, which they lost. In 126 games in 2021, García hit .267/.335/.736 with five home runs and 54 RBIs while batting .200 in the postseason. On December 1, 2021, García re-signed with the White Sox on a three-year, $16.5 million contract. In 97 contests for the team in 2022, García slashed .210/.233/.267 with 3 home runs, 20 RBI, and 2 stolen bases.

García did not make the White Sox's Opening Day roster and was released on March 30, 2023.

On July 11, 2026, Garcia won the inaugural White Sox Alumni Home Run Derby, defeating Gordon Beckham in the finals.

=== Atlanta Braves ===
On December 6, 2023, after spending the previous season out of baseball, García signed a minor league contract with the Atlanta Braves. He played in only 27 games for the Triple–A Gwinnett Stripers, slashing .320/.374/.450 with one home run, 14 RBI, and four stolen bases. García was released by the Braves organization on September 25, 2024.

=== Leones de Yucatán ===
On June 1, 2025, Garcia signed with the Leones de Yucatán of the Mexican League. He made 36 appearances for the Leones, slashing .292/.372/.453 with four home runs, 17 RBI, and four stolen bases. On February 20, 2026, García was released by Yucatán.

== Personal ==
García has three sisters who live in Santiago.
