= Wanders =

Wanders is a surname. Notable persons with that name include:

- Adriaan Wanders (1903–1984), Dutch astronomer and author; minor planet 10428 Wanders is named after him
- Julien Wanders (born 1996), Swiss long-distance runner
- Lilo Wanders (born 1955), German actor, comedian and theatre/television host
- Marcel Wanders (born 1963), Dutch industrial and interior designer

== See also ==
- Wander (disambiguation)
