= An American Stranger =

Studio album by The Upwelling
- Released: August 25, 2009
- Genre: Indie rock, Pop rock
- Label: Edmond Records
- Producer: Ari Ingber (The Upwelling); Jason Hill (Louis XIV); Tyson Ritter (AAR); Stephan Jenkins (Third Eye Blind); Mark Plati (Producer/Guitarist for David Bowie)

The Upwelling chronology
2006 EP (2006)	An American Stranger (2009)

Professional ratings
Review scores
Source	Rating
Glide Magazine	2/5 stars

An American Stranger is the debut album from indie rock band The Upwelling, released on August 25, 2009. It was released after the band was signed to Edmond Records, owned by The All-American Rejects, in partnership with Doghouse Records and Warner Bros.

== Track listing ==
All tracks are written by Ari Ingber.

No.	Title	Length
1.	"American Girls"	3:21
2.	"Garden"	4:04
3.	"Wanderlust"	3:22
4.	"Who Needs You Now"	3:32
5.	"Losers"	3:29
6.	"My Worthy Enemy"	5:12
7.	"I Love That Girl"	4:00
8.	"Murdered by a Big Bomb"	3:50
9.	"Paris"	2:05
10.	"Little Darling"	3:33
11.	"The Sun"	3:10
12.	"Ladder 116"	5:34
13.	"Untitled" (Hidden Track)	0:56

== Personnel ==
- Sean Beresford – engineer, mixing
- Steve Hardy – mixing
- Conor Heffernan – organ, piano, keyboards, vocals, arp
- Jason Hill – vocals, producer, engineer
- Ari Ingber – bass, guitar, percussion, piano, keyboards, programming, vocals, producer
- Stephan Jenkins – guitar, vocals, producer
- Vlado Meller – mastering
- Daniel Mendez – engineer
- Mike Mulieri – engineer
- Mark Plati – producer, engineer
- Tyson Ritter – bass, guitar, percussion, vocals, producer
- Brian Sperber – producer, engineer, mixing
