= Fred Wander =

Austrian writer (1917–2006)

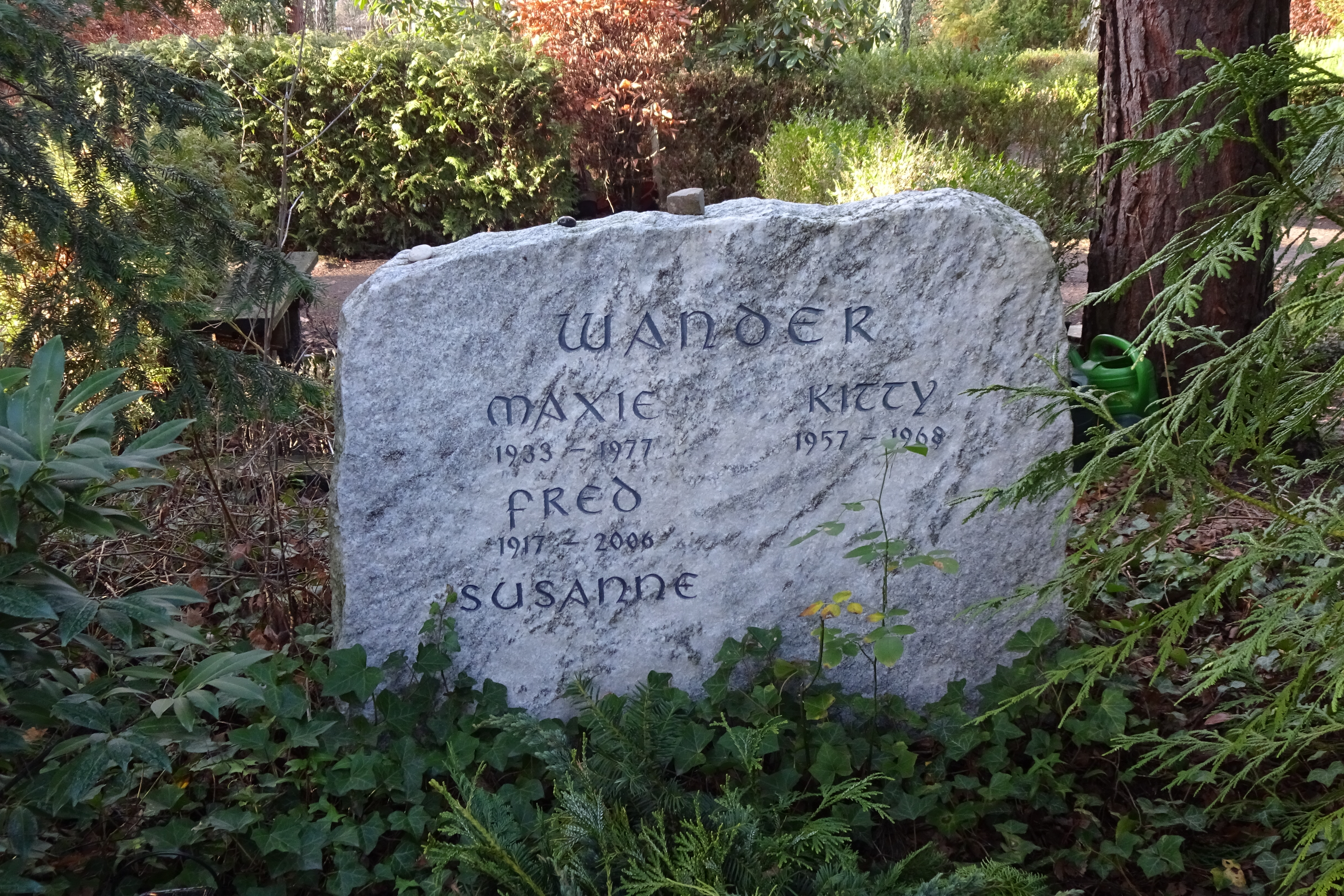
Grave of Fred and Maxie Wander in Kleinmachnow Cemetery

Fred Wander (5 January 1917 – 10 July 2006) was an Austrian writer and Holocaust survivor.

Wander was born Fritz Rosenblatt in Vienna, he left school at 14 and worked as an apprentice in a textile mill, before travelling around Europe taking whatever jobs were going. He spent quite some time in pre-war Paris and this is where he first started to write. In 1938 after the German annexation of Austria, Wander escaped back to Paris via Switzerland. After France declared war on Germany in 1939 he was interned and eventually sent back to Austria, where he ended up in Auschwitz concentration camp, later being sent to Buchenwald concentration camp.
Wander survived the camps and after World War II he lived in East Germany (GDR) from 1958 – 1983. It was while a resident in the GDR that in 1971 The Seventh Well (ISBN 0-7178-0466-6) was published, it was an account of his experiences in the concentration camps. The book won much critical acclaim following a later re-release, including the 2009 JQ Wingate Prize.

In 1983, Wander left the GDR and moved back to his native Vienna. He continued to write up until his death.
