= Maxie Wander =

Austrian author (1933–1977)

Maxie Wander (January 3, 1933 – November 21, 1977) was an Austrian writer in East Germany (GDR), who was born in a proletarian quarter of Vienna. She came to fame after Guten Morgen, Du Schöne (Good Morning My Lovely) was published, and remains an important figure in East German literature after her death from cancer.

== Biography ==
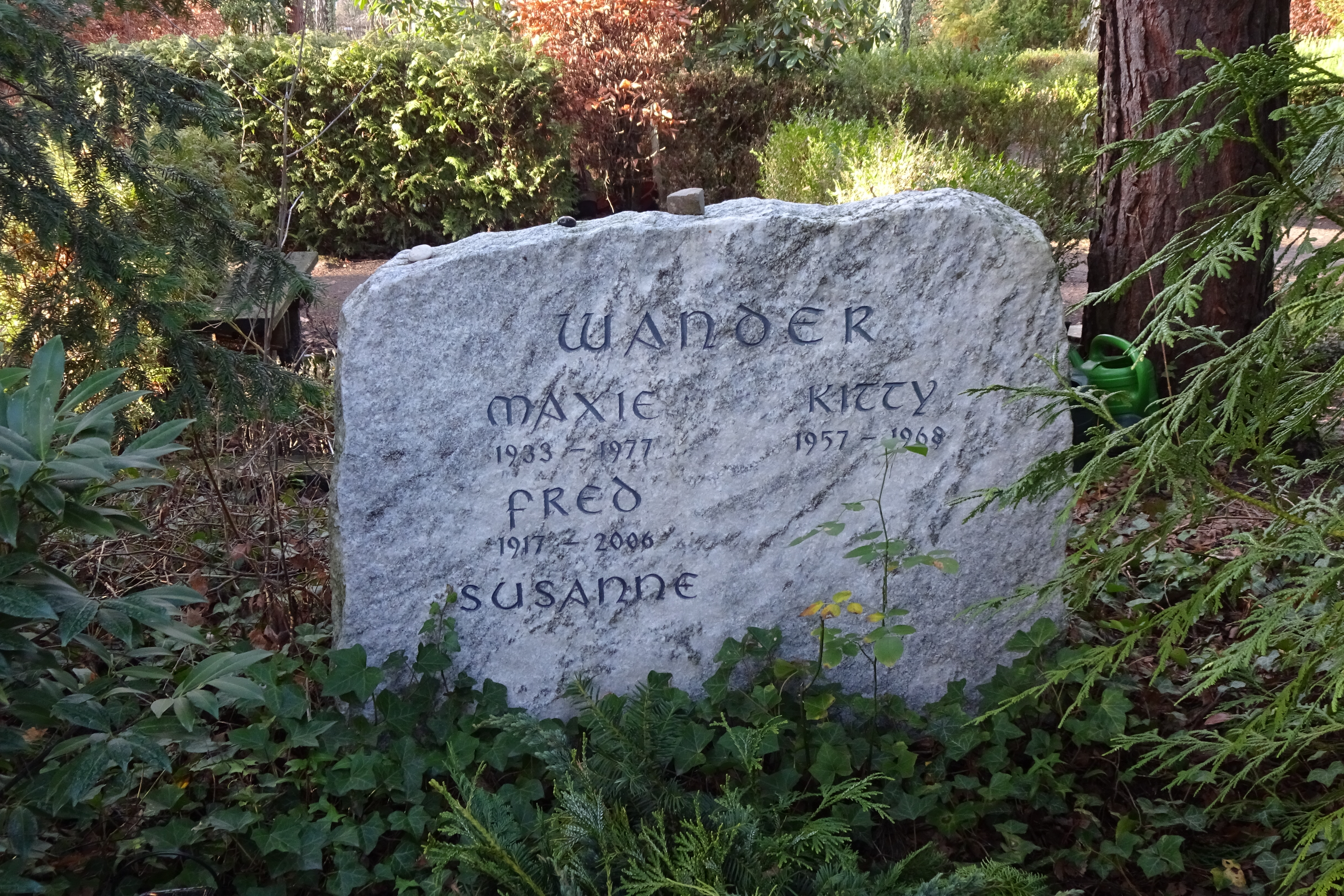
Grave of Maxie and Fred Wander in Kleinmachnow Cemetery

Wander had a rough time in the early stages of her life as she left school at seventeen years old in order to make a living. She was in and out of a number of jobs as a factory worker, a secretary for a company and also a writer for some film scripts. She had no signs of turning her life around to something worth more until she met a Holocaust survivor, who became her husband, Fred Wander. They had three children, and began writing travel books and other journalism. Fred inspired Maxie to become an author that she always wanted to be. In the early to mid 1970s Maxie conducted a large number of interviews with women of all ages in order to help her with her book. She spent much time collecting this material as she wanted to become an important part as a documentary and women's literature writer in Germany. She then published her first book, Guten Morgen, Du Schöne (Good Morning My Lovely), which contained 19 monologues by different women talking about their life day in and day out.

In the monologues which Wander recorded in her book were women expressing their opinions and concerns in society about topics such as sexism, diversity, stress placed on woman and other controversial issues that women go through that they may not feel comfortable about talking to their husband or friends about each day, so they kept these emotions built up inside of them. The book also talked about other sensitive subjects such as suicide and mental breakdown. This book, obviously designed for a female readership, sold 60,000 within one year in just the GDR alone. This shows the effect that her work had on women may have been dealing with these issues.

Her book was published in 1977, the same year she was suffering from incurable cancer. She ended up dying that same year the book was published, but was able to get a chance to experience the immediate glory and positive feedback from her book. She was able to write letters of more issues to her fans as she was sick in the hospital. The effect she had on GDR in such a short period of time was like no other all because the turn around in her life to go reach for her dream to become a writer.

== Sources ==
- Protokolle vom Totenbett: Leben wär' eine prima Alternative. (n.d.). Retrieved October 16, 2014. <http://www.zeit.de/1980/42/leben-waer-eine-prima-alternative>
- Wander - German Literature. (n.d.). Retrieved October 16, 2014. <https://sites.google.com/site/germanliterature/20th-century/wander>
