= Georg Wander =

German chemist (1841–1897)

- Born: 11 August 1841; Osthofen, Germany
- Died: 14 March 1897 (aged 55); Bern, Switzerland
- Known for: Ovomaltine
- Scientific career
- Fields: Chemistry and pharmacology

Georg Wander (11 August 1841 – 14 March 1897) was a German-Swiss chemist and industrialist.

== Biography ==
Georg Wander studied chemistry in Gießen, Tübingen and Würzburg. In 1859 he became a member of the Corps Rhenania Gießen. In 1861 he joined the Corps Rhenania Tübingen. After receiving his doctorate, he was an assistant at the Institute of Chemistry and Pharmacy at the University of Bern from 1863 to 1865.

In 1865 he became a partner in a mineral water factory (Sommer & Comp) in Bern, which he took over in 1867 and expanded into a chemical-technical and analytical laboratory. He mainly took part in producing tinctures, ointments, pastilles, oils, and refreshing beverages. From this laboratory emerged the later Wander AG, which is known worldwide in particular due to the malt beverage Ovomaltine. His successor as company leader was his son Albert Wander who was already helping in the work at this time. He spoke proudly about the Ovalmaltine product in this quote from 1869.

"It must, of course, have seemed a wonderful innovation to the practising physicians when presently a thick, honey-like preparation was produced from the malt which was free of alcohol and carbonic acid, and contained only the excellent and long-appreciated nutrients of the malt in a highly concentrated form"

Georg Wander's scientific and technical achievements included the gentle extraction of barley malt and its enrichment, for which he used quinine, iron and lime in addition to other substances. Continuing into the 1890s he kept on making equipment such as spirit lamps and vacuum evaporators with his son. In 1897 he died and a new product hit the shelves, Herbalpina herbal bonbons.

== Bibliography ==
In total he has 12 works in 19 publications in 2 languages and 71 library holdings. He mostly wrote about the products he made and the chemical process involved with those. Books such as Über das Hesperidin einiger Pflanzen and Liebig : Vortrag gehalten ... im Schosse der Bernischen literarischen Gesellschaft, im Jahre 1896.
