= Wander AG =

Swiss food company

- Type: Private limited company
- Industry: Food
- Founded: 1865
- Founder: Georg Wander
- Fate: Sold off in 2002.
- Headquarters: Neuenegg, Switzerland
- Number of locations: 1
- Key people: Georg Wander, and Albert Wander.
- Products: Ovomaltine, and Isostar.
- Number of employees: 300
- Parent: Associated British Foods
- Website: https://www.wander.ch/

Wander AG (officially: "WANDER AG") is a food producer that is owned by Associated British Foods and is based in Neuenegg (Canton of Bern, Switzerland). The company employs about 300 people in Switzerland. Its most well-known products are Ovomaltine and Isostar.

== History ==
Aerial view (1946)

In 1865 Georg Wander opened a "chemical-technical and analytical" laboratory in the old town of Bern. His son Albert Wander, took over the company in 1897. In 1904, the production of the malt beverage Ovomaltine was started.

In 1913, the first Ovomaltine production facility outside of Switzerland was built in Kings Langley, UK.

In 1927 the Swiss production site was moved from Bern to Neuenegg.

Wander AG was taken over by Sandoz in 1967 and, in 1996, the merger of Sandoz and Ciba-Geigy led to the creation of Novartis. Novartis sold Wander AG to Associated British Foods in 2002.

== Products ==
In addition to Ovomaltine products, Wander AG also manufactures the first isotonic drink on the market, Isostar, as well as the chocolate beverage powder Caotina, the nutritional supplement Jemalt.
