= Wander Franco =

Dominican baseball player (born 2001)

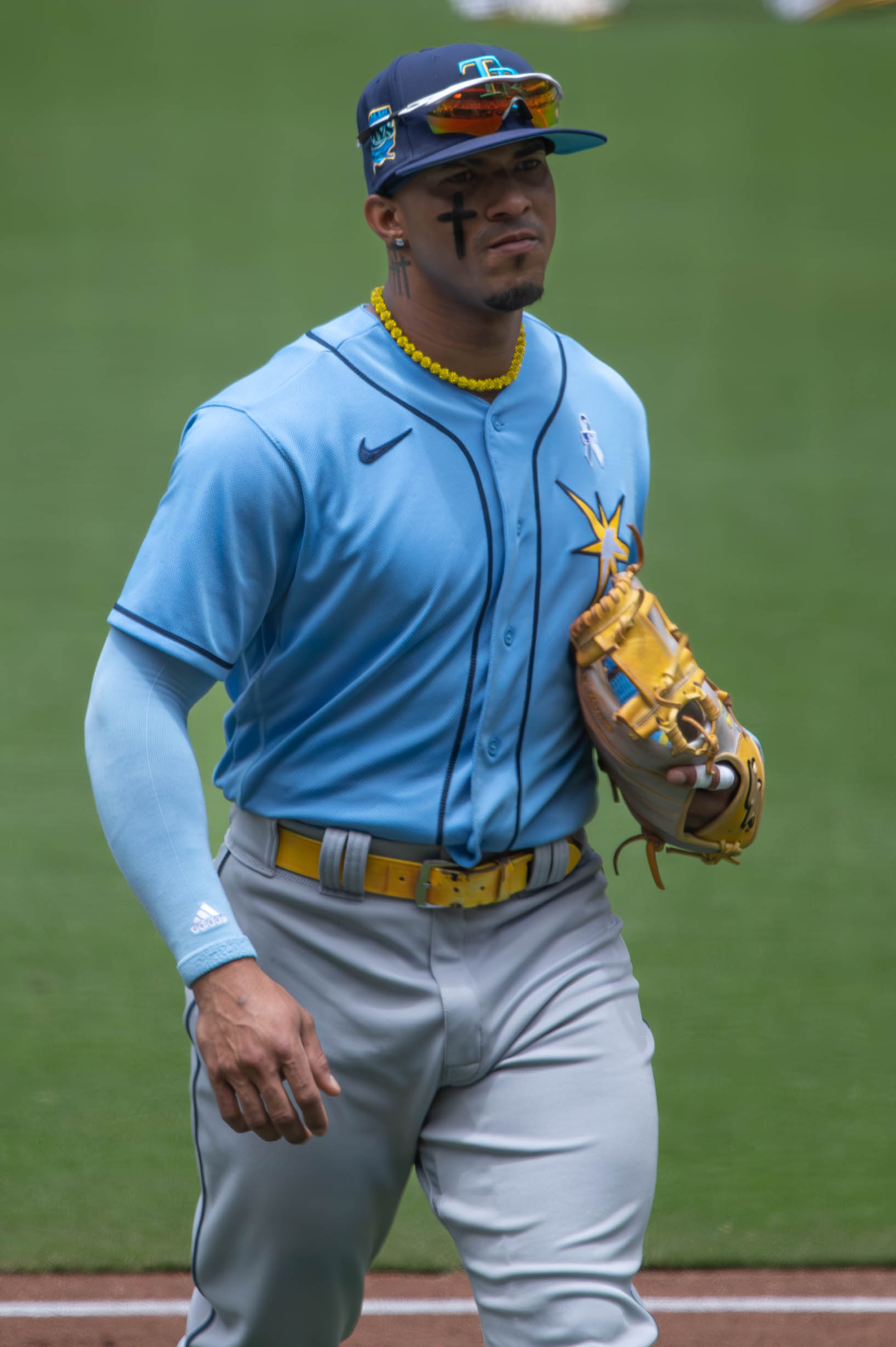
- Franco with the Tampa Bay Rays in 2023

Tampa Bay Rays
- Shortstop
- Born: March 1, 2001 (age 25); Baní, Dominican Republic
- Bats: Switch Throws: Right

MLB debut
- June 22, 2021, for the Tampa Bay Rays

MLB statistics (through 2023 season)
- Batting average: .282
- Home runs: 30
- Runs batted in: 130
- Stats at Baseball Reference

Teams
- Tampa Bay Rays (2021–2023)

Career highlights and awards
- All-Star (2023)

Wander Samuel Franco Aybar (born March 1, 2001), nicknamed "El Patron", is a Dominican professional baseball shortstop who last played for the Tampa Bay Rays of Major League Baseball (MLB). He made his MLB debut in 2021 and was an All-Star in 2023.

Franco has not played in affiliated baseball since August 2023, when he was placed on administrative leave due to an investigation into allegations of relationships with underage girls in the Dominican Republic. In 2025, a Dominican court found Franco guilty of sexual abuse and sexual exploitation of a 14-year-old minor; he received a suspended sentence of two years in prison. His first trial was voided by a Dominican appeals court. In 2026, Franco was re-tried and found criminally responsible for sexual and psychological abuse, but was judicially pardoned and spared jail time because the minor's mother had blackmailed him.

== Professional career ==
=== Minor leagues ===
Franco was ranked as one of the top international prospects in the 2017 international class. He signed with the Tampa Bay Rays organization on July 2, 2017, for a signing bonus of $3.85 million. He made his professional debut in 2018 with the Princeton Rays. On July 14, Franco hit for the cycle. At 17 years old, Franco was named the 2018 Appalachian League Player of the Year after hitting for a .374/.445/.636 slash line with 11 home runs and 57 runs batted in (RBIs) over 245 plate appearances for Princeton.

Prior to the 2019 season, Franco was ranked as the fourth best prospect by Baseball America. He began the season with the Bowling Green Hot Rods. He was promoted to the Charlotte Stone Crabs on June 25. Franco was named to the All-Star Futures Game. He finished the 2019 season with a .327/.398/.487 slash line with nine home runs and 53 RBIs.

Prior to the 2020 season, Franco was ranked the No. 1 prospect in all of baseball. Franco did not play in any minor league contests due to the cancellation of the minor league season because of the COVID-19 pandemic. On September 22, the Rays added Franco to their pool of players who would be eligible to play in the Major League Baseball (MLB) postseason but he did not appear in the playoffs. He played in the Dominican Winter League in the 2020-21 offseason with Leones del Escogido, batting .350/.435/.500 in 23 plate appearances.

=== 2021: MLB debut ===
The Rays invited Franco to major league spring training in 2021, but he did not make the team and began the season in Triple-A with the Durham Bulls. In 39 games with Durham, Franco had a .315/.367/.586 slash line with seven home runs and 35 RBIs.

On June 20, the Rays announced that Franco would be promoted to the major leagues ahead of a series against the Boston Red Sox. He was formally selected to the 40-man roster on June 22. Franco made his MLB debut that night. In the game, he recorded his first career hit, home run, and RBI on a three-run shot off of starter Eduardo Rodríguez in the fifth inning. At 20 years and 113 days old, Franco was the second-youngest player (after B. J. Upton) to debut for the Rays.

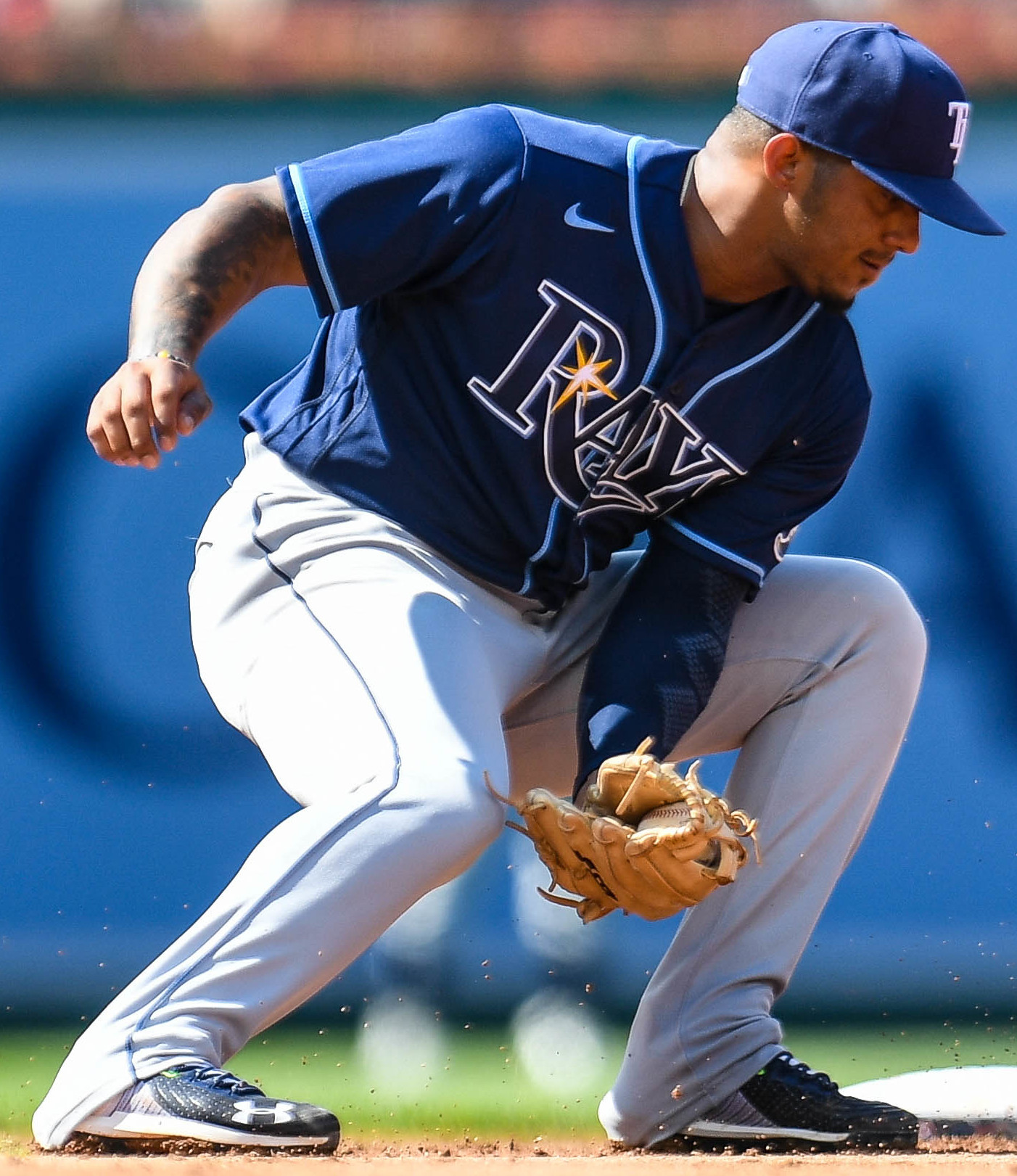
Franco in 2021

On August 25, Franco reached base safely for the 26th consecutive game, the longest streak by an MLB player under 21 years old since 1961. On September 7, Franco reached base safely for the 37th consecutive time, passing Mickey Mantle’s 36-game on-base streak for a player 20 years old or younger. Franco's streak ended at 43 consecutive games on September 30, leaving him tied with Frank Robinson. Franco finished third in American League Rookie of the Year Award voting, losing out to teammate Randy Arozarena.

On November 23, Franco and the Rays agreed to an 11-year, $182 million contract extension, with a club option of $25 million for a 12th year. At age 20, Franco became the youngest player in baseball history to sign a contract worth at least $100 million, passing Ronald Acuña Jr.'s eight-year, $100 million contract extension signed in 2019. Franco's deal was the largest for any player with less than one year of major league service time, surpassed by Julio Rodríguez's extension in 2022.

=== 2022: injuries ===
On April 22, 2022, Franco had his first multi-home run game against the Red Sox. Franco became the youngest player in franchise history to have a multi homer game, doing so at age 21 and 52 days old.

On May 31, Franco was placed on the 10-day injured list due to a strained quadriceps. He was activated on June 26. On July 9, Franco returned to the 10-day injured list. Two days later, it was announced Franco would miss five to eight weeks due to hand surgery. On September 9, he was activated off the injured list. He finished his only full season in the majors batting .277 with 6 home runs and 33 RBI in 83 games.

=== 2023: All-Star Game and restricted list ===
Franco played for the Dominican Republic in the 2023 World Baseball Classic. With Willy Adames and Jeremy Peña at shortstop, Franco instead played second base, splitting time with Ketel Marte. In 12 plate appearances in three games, Franco hit .222/.417/.222, leading the team in walks (along with Juan Soto) with three.

Franco was selected to his first MLB All-Star Game as the roster replacement for the injured Aaron Judge. Franco hit .281 with 17 home runs and 58 RBI for the season.

On August 13, Franco was placed on the Rays' restricted list as MLB and a specialized Minor and Gender Violence Division based in Peravia in the Dominican Republic began investigations into an alleged relationship with a 14-year-old minor. Franco was then placed on indefinite administrative leave by MLB. The league stated the administrative leave "is not disciplinary under the Joint Domestic Violence, Sexual Assault and Child Abuse Policy". He was reinstated to the 40-man roster by the Rays following the conclusion of the 2023 season, as administrative leave is only available in-season.

After he was formally charged in 2024, the Rays requested that he be placed back on the restricted list for failure to report. The terms of his bail theoretically allowed him to leave the Dominican Republic, provided he returned to check in with authorities monthly, but immigration experts told The Athletic that it would have been all but impossible for him to enter the United States while the trial was underway. He has remained on the restricted list ever since, and is thus not eligible for pay or accrued service time.

== Abuse charges ==
In July 2024, Franco was charged in the Dominican Republic with sexual abuse, sexual exploitation of a minor and human trafficking, related to his sexual encounters with a 14-year-old girl. On June 26, 2025, Franco was found guilty and received a suspended sentence of three years in prison. On December 9, Franco's conviction was overturned and a new trial was ordered. The new trial was scheduled to begin on March 30, 2026. In May 2026, Franco was again found criminally responsible for psychological and sexual abuse of a minor, but was granted a judicial pardon from jail time due to being subjected to extortion by the victim's mother. The pardon was overturned by a Dominican court of appeals, but Franco's sentence was not changed, as he will need to maintain a fixed residence while under judicial supervision for three full years or serve 3 years in jail per the core conviction (https://www.espn.com/mlb/story/_/id/50321421/court-revokes-pardon-rays-wander-franco-sex-abuse-case),

In November 2024, while awaiting trial, Franco was arrested in San Juan de la Maguana after an altercation in which guns were drawn. He was charged with illegal possession of a handgun in June 2025.

The nature of the charges make it prohibitively difficult for him to obtain an American work visa; he is expected to remain on MLB's restricted list unless he can secure a visa. Immigration experts told The Athletic that Franco would have had to be fully exonerated to have any realistic chance of getting a visa and could have faced a permanent ban from ever entering the United States again if convicted on the most serious charges. Along similar lines, several immigration lawyers told the Tampa Bay Times that since Franco was convicted of a "crime involving moral turpitude," it would be all but impossible for him to enter the U.S. unless he was fully exonerated on appeal.

== Personal life ==
Franco's parents are both from Baní, Dominican Republic. His father, also named Wander, played baseball. His mother is the sister of Erick Aybar and Willy Aybar, both of whom played in MLB. His brothers, Wander Alexander Franco and Wander Javier Franco, played in the Houston Astros and San Francisco Giants minor league systems. Franco dropped out of school after sixth grade to focus on baseball.

Franco married his girlfriend after the 2021 MLB season. They have two sons, born in late 2018 and 2022.
