= 2021 New York Yankees season =

Season for the Major League Baseball team the New York Yankees

2021 New York Yankees
- American League Wild Card
- League: American League
- Division: East
- Ballpark: Yankee Stadium
- City: New York
- Record: 92–70 (.568)
- Divisional place: 3rd
- Owners: Yankee Global Enterprises
- General managers: Brian Cashman
- Managers: Aaron Boone
- Television: YES Network; WPIX-TV (Michael Kay, Ken Singleton, Ryan Ruocco, several others as analysts)
- Radio: WFAN SportsRadio 66 AM / 101.9 FM; New York Yankees Radio Network (John Sterling, Suzyn Waldman); WADO 1280 AM TUDN Radio; Cadena Radio Yankees (Francisco Rivera, Rickie Ricardo)

The 2021 New York Yankees season was the 119th season for the New York Yankees franchise.

They opened the season on April 1 with a 3–2 loss to the Toronto Blue Jays at Yankee Stadium, with the crowd at only 20% capacity, and closed the season on October 3 with 1–0 defeat of the Tampa Bay Rays.

The Yankees entered the season expecting to contend for the World Series, but underperformed and went 41–41, with 80 games left to play on July 4. They then went 51–29 in their final 80 games, including a season-high 13 game winning streak, their longest since 1961. On October 3, the Yankees clinched a Wild Card berth in the season's final game with a 1–0 win against the Tampa Bay Rays. Finishing the regular season with a 92–70 record, they qualified for the postseason as the fifth seed in the American League (AL), but lost the AL Wild Card Game to the fourth-seed Boston Red Sox at Fenway Park on October 5 - their fifth consecutive playoff exit.

A full crowd at Globe Life Field saw starting pitcher Corey Kluber throw a no-hitter against the Texas Rangers on May 19.

The Yankees turned an 'around-the-horn' triple play on May 21 against the Chicago White Sox starting with third baseman Gio Urshela to second baseman Rougned Odor and then to first baseman Luke Voit. Then on June 17, against the Toronto Blue Jays in Buffalo, New York, the Yankees turned the first 1-3-6-2-5-6 triple play in major league history (and thus became the first Yankees team to turn more than one triple play in a season). On June 20, they turned their record-tying third triple play of the season, stranding the go-ahead run in the top of the ninth inning to defeat the Oakland Athletics.

From September 6–9, the Yankees lost a 4-game series to the Toronto Blue Jays without ever holding a lead in any game, the first time since 1924 that a Yankee team had ever done so in the regular season.

== Offseason ==
=== Transactions ===
==== 2020 ====
- December 2 – Luis Cessa re-signs with the Yankees on a 1-year, $1 million contract.

==== 2021 ====
- January 6 – acquired outfielder Greg Allen from the Cleveland Indians in exchange for James Reeves.
- January 24 – acquired starting pitcher Jameson Taillon from the Pittsburgh Pirates for four prospects (Miguel Yajure, Roansy Contreras, Maikol Escotto, and Canaan Smith).
- January 27 – signed right-handed starting pitcher Corey Kluber to a one-year, $11 million contract.
- January 27 – DJ LeMahieu re-signs with the Yankees on a six-year, $90 million contract.
- February 10 – signed sidearm right-handed pitcher Darren O'Day to a one-year, $1.75 million contract .
- February 22 – Brett Gardner re-signs with the Yankees on a one-year, $4 million contract.
- February 23 – signed left-handed pitcher Justin Wilson to a one-year, $4 million contract.

== Regular season ==
Patch worn in memory of Whitey Ford, who died on October 8, 2020

=== Transactions ===
==== 2021 ====
- April 6 – acquired second baseman Rougned Odor from the Texas Rangers in a trade along with cash considerations and minor league outfielders Antonio Cabello and Josh Stowers.
- April 27 – acquired left-handed pitcher Wandy Peralta and infielder Connor Cannon from the San Francisco Giants in exchange for outfielder Mike Tauchman.
- July 1 – acquired outfielder Tim Locastro from the Arizona Diamondbacks for minor league right-handed pitcher Keegan Curtis.
- July 26 – acquired right-handed relief pitcher Clay Holmes from the Pittsburgh Pirates for minor league infielders Diego Castillo and Hoy Park.
- July 27 – traded relievers Luis Cessa and Justin Wilson to the Cincinnati Reds for a player to be named later.
- July 29 – acquired outfielder Joey Gallo and left-handed relief pitcher Joely Rodríguez from the Texas Rangers for minor league prospects: Ezequiel Duran, Trevor Hauver, Glenn Otto and Josh Smith.
- July 29 – acquired first baseman Anthony Rizzo from the Chicago Cubs for minor league right-handed pitcher Alexander Vizcaino and outfielder Kevin Alcantara. The Yankees also acquired cash considerations ($5.5 million), and the remaining balance of Rizzo's $16.5 million salary this season.
- July 30 – acquired left-handed starting pitcher Andrew Heaney from the Los Angeles Angels and cash considerations for minor league right-handed pitcher Janson Junk and Elvis Peguero.

== Season standings ==
=== American League East ===
AL East
Team	W	L	Pct.	GB	Home	Road
Tampa Bay Rays	100	62	.617	—	52‍–‍29	48‍–‍33
Boston Red Sox	92	70	.568	8	49‍–‍32	43‍–‍38
New York Yankees	92	70	.568	8	46‍–‍35	46‍–‍35
Toronto Blue Jays	91	71	.562	9	47‍–‍33	44‍–‍38
Baltimore Orioles	52	110	.321	48	27‍–‍54	25‍–‍56

=== American League Wild Card ===
Division leaders
Team	W	L	Pct.
Tampa Bay Rays	100	62	.617
Houston Astros	95	67	.586
Chicago White Sox	93	69	.574

Wild Card teams (Top 2 teams qualify for postseason)
Team	W	L	Pct.	GB
Boston Red Sox	92	70	.568	—
New York Yankees	92	70	.568	—
Toronto Blue Jays	91	71	.562	1
Seattle Mariners	90	72	.556	2
Oakland Athletics	86	76	.531	6
Cleveland Indians	80	82	.494	12
Los Angeles Angels	77	85	.475	15
Detroit Tigers	77	85	.475	15
Kansas City Royals	74	88	.457	18
Minnesota Twins	73	89	.451	19
Texas Rangers	60	102	.370	32
Baltimore Orioles	52	110	.321	40

=== Record against opponents ===
2021 American League record Source: MLB Standings Grid – 2021
Team	BAL	BOS	CWS	CLE	DET	HOU	KC	LAA	MIN	NYY	OAK	SEA	TB	TEX	TOR	NL
Baltimore	—	6–13	0–7	2–5	2–5	3–3	4–3	2–4	2–4	8–11	3–3	3–4	1–18	4–3	5–14	7–13
Boston	13–6	—	3–4	4–2	3–3	2–5	5–2	3–3	5–2	10–9	3–3	4–3	8–11	3–4	10–9	16–4
Chicago	7–0	4–3	—	10–9	12–7	2–5	9–10	2–5	13–6	1–5	4–3	3–3	3–3	5–1	4–3	14–6
Cleveland	5–2	2–4	9–10	—	12–7	1–6	14–5	5–1	8–11	3–4	2–4	3–4	1–6	4–2	2–5	9–11
Detroit	5–2	3–3	7–12	7–12	—	5–2	8–11	1–6	8–11	3–3	1–6	5–1	4–3	6–1	3–3	11–9
Houston	3–3	5–2	5–2	6–1	2–5	—	3–4	13–6	3–4	2–4	11–8	11–8	4–2	14–5	4–2	9–11
Kansas City	3–4	2–5	10–9	5–14	11–8	4–3	—	2–4	10–9	2–4	2–5	4–3	2–4	2–4	3–4	12–8
Los Angeles	4–2	3–3	5–2	1–5	6–1	6–13	4–2	—	5–2	4–3	4–15	8–11	1–6	11–8	4–3	11–9
Minnesota	4–2	2–5	6–13	11–8	11–8	4–3	9–10	2–5	—	1–6	1–5	2–4	3–3	4–3	3–4	10–10
New York	11–8	9–10	5–1	4–3	3–3	4–2	4–2	3–4	6–1	—	4–3	5–2	8–11	6–1	8–11	12–8
Oakland	3–3	3–3	3–4	4–2	6–1	8–11	5–2	15–4	5–1	3–4	—	4–15	4–3	10–9	2–5	11–9
Seattle	4–3	3–4	3–3	4–3	1–5	8–11	3–4	11–8	4–2	2–5	15–4	—	6–1	13–6	4–2	9–11
Tampa Bay	18–1	11–8	3–3	6–1	3–4	2–4	4–2	6–1	3–3	11–8	3–4	1–6	—	3–4	11–8	15–5
Texas	3–4	4–3	1–5	2–4	1–6	5–14	4–2	8–11	3–4	1–6	9–10	6–13	4–3	—	2–4	7–13
Toronto	14–5	9–10	3–4	5–2	3–3	2–4	4–3	3–4	4–3	11–8	5–2	2–4	8–11	4–2	—	14–6

Updated with the results of all games through October 3, 2021.

=== Yankees team leaders ===
Batting
Hits	DJ LeMahieu	160
Batting average†	Aaron Judge	.287
RBIs	Aaron Judge	98
Home runs	Aaron Judge	39
Runs scored	Aaron Judge	89
Stolen bases	Tyler Wade	17
Pitching
Wins	Gerrit Cole	16
ERA‡	Gerrit Cole	3.23
WHIP‡	Gerrit Cole	1.06
Strikeouts	Gerrit Cole	243
Saves	Aroldis Chapman	30

Updated through game of September 30.
† Minimum 3.1 plate appearances per team games played
AVG qualified batters: Judge, Stanton, LeMahieu
‡ Minimum 1 inning pitched per team games played
ERA & WHIP qualified pitchers: Cole

== Game log ==
On November 23, MLB announced that the Yankees would face the Chicago White Sox in the first MLB at Field of Dreams game in Dyersville, Iowa on August 12. This game was originally scheduled for August 13, 2020. Yankees went on to lose the game 9–8.

Legend
	Yankees win
	Yankees loss
	Postponement
**Bold**	Yankees team member

2021 game log: 92–70 (Home: 46–35; Away: 46–35)
April: 12–14 (Home: 5–7; Away: 7–7)

#	Date	Opponent	Score	Win	Loss	Save	Stadium	Attendance	Record
1	April 1	Blue Jays	2–3 (10)	Romano (1–0)	**Nelson** (0–1)	Merryweather (1)	**Yankee Stadium**	10,850	0–1
2	April 3	Blue Jays	5–3	**Loáisiga** (1–0)	Stripling (0–1)	**Green** (1)	**Yankee Stadium**	10,107	1–1
3	April 4	Blue Jays	1–3	Borucki (1–0)	**Germán** (0–1)	Merryweather (2)	**Yankee Stadium**	10,066	1–2
4	April 5	Orioles	7–0	**Montgomery** (1–0)	López (0–1)	—	**Yankee Stadium**	9,008	2–2
5	April 6	Orioles	7–2	**Cole** (1–0)	Kremer (0–1)	—	**Yankee Stadium**	9,404	3–2
6	April 7	Orioles	3–4 (11)	Valdez (1–0)	**Green** (0–1)	Fry (1)	**Yankee Stadium**	10,254	3–3
7	April 9	@ Rays	5–10	Hill (1–0)	**Kluber** (0–1)	—	Tropicana Field	9,021	3–4
8	April 10	@ Rays	0–4	Kittredge (2–0)	**Germán** (0–2)	—	Tropicana Field	6,270	3–5
9	April 11	@ Rays	8–4 (10)	**Chapman** (1–0)	McHugh (0–1)	—	Tropicana Field	6,965	4–5
10	April 12	@ Blue Jays	3–1	**Cole** (2–0)	Ray (0–1)	**Chapman** (1)	TD Ballpark	1,576	5–5
11	April 13	@ Blue Jays	3–7	Ryu (1–1)	**Taillon** (0–1)	—	TD Ballpark	1,550	5–6
12	April 14	@ Blue Jays	4–5	Dolis (1–0)	**Green** (0–2)	—	TD Ballpark	1,613	5–7
13	April 16	Rays	2–8	Wacha (1–1)	**Nelson** (0–2)	—	**Yankee Stadium**	10,202	5–8
14	April 17	Rays	3–6	Glasnow (2–0)	**Montgomery** (1–1)	Castillo (4)	**Yankee Stadium**	10,583	5–9
15	April 18	Rays	2–4	Yarbrough (1–2)	**Cole** (2–1)	Springs (1)	**Yankee Stadium**	10,606	5–10
16	April 20	Braves	3–1	**Loáisiga** (2–0)	Matzek (0–2)	**Chapman** (2)	**Yankee Stadium**	10,017	6–10
17	April 21	Braves	1–4	Anderson (1–0)	**Kluber** (0–2)	—	**Yankee Stadium**	9,634	6–11
18	April 22	@ Indians	6–3	**Germán** (1–2)	Wittgren (0–1)	**Chapman** (3)	Progressive Field	6,380	7–11
19	April 23	@ Indians	5–3	**Luetge** (1–0)	Allen (1–3)	**Chapman** (4)	Progressive Field	8,662	8–11
20	April 24	@ Indians	2–1	**Cole** (3–1)	Bieber (2–2)	**Loáisiga** (1)	Progressive Field	8,817	9–11
21	April 25	@ Indians	3–7	Hentges (1–0)	**Taillon** (0–2)	—	Progressive Field	8,766	9–12
22	April 26	@ Orioles	2–4	Harvey (2–1)	**García** (0–1)	Valdez (5)	Camden Yards	6,367	9–13
23	April 27	@ Orioles	5–1	**Kluber** (1–2)	Zimmermann (1–3)	—	Camden Yards	6,662	10–13
24	April 28	@ Orioles	7–0	**Germán** (2–2)	Kremer (0–2)	—	Camden Yards	7,338	11–13
25	April 29	@ Orioles	3–4 (10)	Scott (1–2)	**Loáisiga** (2–1)	—	Camden Yards	7,738	11–14
26	April 30	Tigers	10–0	**Cole** (4–1)	Skubal (0–4)	—	**Yankee Stadium**	9,523	12–14

May: 17–11 (Home: 10–5; Away: 7–6)

#	Date	Opponent	Score	Win	Loss	Save	Stadium	Attendance	Record
27	May 1	Tigers	6–4	**Taillon** (1–2)	Turnbull (1–2)	**Chapman** (5)	**Yankee Stadium**	10,015	13–14
28	May 2	Tigers	2–0	**Kluber** (2–2)	Ureña (1–4)	**Chapman** (6)	**Yankee Stadium**	10,021	14–14
29	May 4	Astros	7–3	**Luetge** (2–0)	Bielak (1–1)	—	**Yankee Stadium**	10,850	15–14
30	May 5	Astros	6–3	**Loáisiga** (3–1)	Raley (0–2)	**Chapman** (7)	**Yankee Stadium**	9,895	16–14
31	May 6	Astros	4–7	Scrubb (1–0)	**Green** (0–3)	Pressly (5)	**Yankee Stadium**	10,042	16–15
32	May 7	Nationals	4–11	Finnegan (2–0)	**Loáisiga** (3–2)	—	**Yankee Stadium**	10,010	16–16
33	May 8	Nationals	4–3 (11)	**Wilson** (1–0)	Rainey (0–2)	—	**Yankee Stadium**	10,850	17–16
34	May 9	Nationals	3–2	**Chapman** (2–0)	Hand (2–1)	—	**Yankee Stadium**	10,092	18–16
35	May 11	@ Rays	3–1	**Montgomery** (2–1)	Patiño (1–1)	**Chapman** (8)	Tropicana Field	5,441	19–16
36	May 12	@ Rays	1–0	**Cole** (5–1)	Thompson (2–2)	**Chapman** (9)	Tropicana Field	5,668	20–16
37	May 13	@ Rays	1–9	Hill (2–1)	**Taillon** (1–3)	—	Tropicana Field	6,229	20–17
38	May 14	@ Orioles	5–4	**Kluber** (3–2)	Lakins (1–4)	**Loáisiga** (2)	Camden Yards	10,809	21–17
39	May 15	@ Orioles	8–2	**Germán** (3–2)	López (1–4)	—	Camden Yards	10,767	22–17
40	May 16	@ Orioles	6–10	Zimmermann (2–3)	**King** (0–1)	—	Camden Yards	11,070	22–18
41	May 17	@ Rangers	2–5	Lyles (2–3)	**Cole** (5–2)	Kennedy (11)	Globe Life Field	28,040	22–19
42	May 18	@ Rangers	7–4	**Peralta** (1–0)	Foltynewicz (1–4)	**Chapman** (10)	Globe Life Field	26,522	23–19
43	May 19	@ Rangers	2–0	**Kluber** (4–2)	Yang (0–1)	—	Globe Life Field	31,689	24–19
44	May 20	@ Rangers	2–0	**Germán** (4–2)	King (4–3)	**Chapman** (11)	Globe Life Field	27,581	25–19
45	May 21	White Sox	2–1	**Chapman** (3–0)	Marshall (1–2)	—	**Yankee Stadium**	14,011	26–19
46	May 22	White Sox	7–0	**Cole** (6–2)	Cease (2–1)	—	**Yankee Stadium**	14,665	27–19
47	May 23	White Sox	5–4	**Chapman** (4–0)	Bummer (0–3)	—	**Yankee Stadium**	14,007	28–19
48	May 25	Blue Jays	2–6	Matz (6–2)	**Kluber** (4–3)	—	**Yankee Stadium**	12,025	28–20
—	May 26	Blue Jays	Postponed (Rain, Makeup May 27)						
49	May 27 (1)	Blue Jays	0–2 (7)	Manoah (1–0)	**Germán** (4–3)	Romano (2)	**Yankee Stadium**	N/A	28–21
50	May 27 (2)	Blue Jays	5–3 (7)	**Loáisiga** (4–2)	Ray (2–2)	**Green** (2)	**Yankee Stadium**	14,056	29–21
51	May 28	@ Tigers	2–3 (10)	Garcia (1–1)	**Wilson** (1–1)	—	Comerica Park	8,000	29–22
52	May 29	@ Tigers	1–6	Turnbull (4–2)	**García** (0–2)	—	Comerica Park	8,000	29–23
53	May 30	@ Tigers	2–6	Skubal (2–7)	**King** (0–2)	—	Comerica Park	8,000	29–24
54	May 31	Rays	1–3	Hill (4–2)	**Taillon** (1–4)	Feyereisen (3)	**Yankee Stadium**	17,008	29–25

June: 12–14 (Home: 7–8; Away: 5–6)

#	Date	Opponent	Score	Win	Loss	Save	Stadium	Attendance	Record
55	June 1	Rays	5–3 (11)	**Cessa** (1–0)	Kittredge (5–1)	—	**Yankee Stadium**	12,537	30–25
56	June 2	Rays	4–3	**Montgomery** (3–1)	McClanahan (2–1)	**Chapman** (12)	**Yankee Stadium**	13,824	31–25
57	June 3	Rays	2–9	Yarbrough (3–3)	**Cole** (6–3)	—	**Yankee Stadium**	12,614	31–26
58	June 4	Red Sox	2–5	Eovaldi (7–2)	**King** (0–3)	Barnes (13)	**Yankee Stadium**	18,040	31–27
59	June 5	Red Sox	3–7	Whitlock (1–1)	**Green** (0–4)	Barnes (14)	**Yankee Stadium**	20,019	31–28
60	June 6	Red Sox	5–6 (10)	Barnes (2–1)	**Cessa** (1–1)	Valdéz (1)	**Yankee Stadium**	19,103	31–29
61	June 8	@ Twins	8–4	**Loáisiga** (5–2)	Rogers (2–3)	—	Target Field	17,949	32–29
62	June 9	@ Twins	9–6	**Cole** (7–3)	Dobnak (1–6)	—	Target Field	17,078	33–29
63	June 10	@ Twins	5–7	Robles (2–2)	**Chapman** (4–1)	—	Target Field	17,728	33–30
64	June 12	@ Phillies	7–8 (10)	Bradley (2–1)	**Chapman** (4–2)	—	Citizens Bank Park	38,450	33–31
65	June 13	@ Phillies	0–7	Nola (5–4)	**Germán** (4–4)	—	Citizens Bank Park	38,512	33–32
66	June 15	@ Blue Jays	6–5	**Loáisiga** (6–2)	Mayza (1–1)	**Chapman** (13)	Sahlen Field	7,145	34–32
67	June 16	@ Blue Jays	3–2	**Cole** (8–3)	Stripling (2–4)	**Chapman** (14)	Sahlen Field	7,271	35–32
68	June 17	@ Blue Jays	8–4	**Green** (1–4)	Castro (1–2)	—	Sahlen Field	7,288	36–32
69	June 18	Athletics	3–5	Kaprielian (4–1)	**Peralta** (3–2)	Trivino (12)	**Yankee Stadium**	24,037	36–33
70	June 19	Athletics	7–5	**Green** (2–4)	Luzardo (2–4)	**Chapman** (15)	**Yankee Stadium**	23,985	37–33
71	June 20	Athletics	2–1	**Loáisiga** (7–2)	Manaea (6–3)	**Chapman** (16)	**Yankee Stadium**	27,807	38–33
72	June 22	Royals	5–6	Brentz (2–0)	**Loáisiga** (7–3)	Holland (5)	**Yankee Stadium**	21,130	38–34
73	June 23	Royals	6–5	**Chapman** (5–2)	Holland (2–3)	—	**Yankee Stadium**	25,032	39–34
74	June 24	Royals	8–1	**Taillon** (2–4)	Keller (6–8)	—	**Yankee Stadium**	21,350	40–34
75	June 25	@ Red Sox	3–5	Whitlock (3–1)	**Germán** (4–5)	Barnes (16)	Fenway Park	36,869	40–35
76	June 26	@ Red Sox	2–4	Eovaldi (8–4)	**Montgomery** (3–2)	Ottavino (5)	Fenway Park	36,857	40–36
77	June 27	@ Red Sox	2–9	Rodríguez (6–4)	**Cole** (8–4)	—	Fenway Park	34,507	40–37
78	June 28	Angels	3–5	Suárez (3–1)	**King** (0–4)	Iglesias (14)	**Yankee Stadium**	25,054	40–38
79	June 29	Angels	11–5	**Taillon** (3–4)	Heaney (4–6)	—	**Yankee Stadium**	23,152	41–38
80	June 30	Angels	8–11	Mayers (2–3)	**Luetge** (2–1)	Iglesias (15)	**Yankee Stadium**	30,714	41–39

July: 14–9 (Home: 5–3; Away: 9–6)

#	Date	Opponent	Score	Win	Loss	Save	Stadium	Attendance	Record
—	July 1	Angels	Postponed (Rain, Makeup August 16)						
—	July 2	Mets	Postponed (Rain, Makeup July 4)						
81	July 3	Mets	3–8	Walker (7–3)	**Montgomery** (3–3)	—	**Yankee Stadium**	40,047	41–40
82	July 4 (1)	Mets	5–10 (7)	Familia (3–1)	**Chapman** (5–3)	—	**Yankee Stadium**	42,714	41–41
83	July 4 (2)	Mets	4–2	**Green** (3–4)	Oswalt (1–1)	—	**Yankee Stadium**	42,107	42–41
84	July 6	@ Mariners	12–1	**Taillon** (4–4)	Sheffield (5–8)	—	T-Mobile Park	16,547	43–41
85	July 7	@ Mariners	5–4	**Cessa** (2–1)	Kikuchi (6–4)	**Green** (3)	T-Mobile Park	17,205	44–41
86	July 8	@ Mariners	0–4	Gilbert (3–2)	**Montgomery** (3–4)	—	T-Mobile Park	17,254	44–42
87	July 9	@ Astros	4–0	**Luetge** (3–1)	Odorizzi (3–4)	—	Minute Maid Park	40,857	45–42
88	July 10	@ Astros	1–0	**Cole** (9–4)	Greinke (8–3)	—	Minute Maid Park	41,259	46–42
89	July 11	@ Astros	7–8	Garza Jr. (1–2)	**Green** (3–5)	—	Minute Maid Park	37,928	46–43
**91st All-Star Game in Denver, Colorado**
—	July 15	Red Sox	Postponed (COVID-19, Makeup August 17)						
90	July 16	Red Sox	0–4	Rodríguez (7–5)	**Montgomery** (3–5)	Houck (1)	**Yankee Stadium**	40,130	46–44
91	July 17	Red Sox	3–1 (6)	**Cole** (10–4)	Sawamura (4–1)	—	**Yankee Stadium**	37,095	47–44
92	July 18	Red Sox	9–1	**Taillon** (5–4)	Pérez (7–6)	—	**Yankee Stadium**	40,309	48–44
93	July 20	Phillies	6–4	**Cessa** (3–1)	Nola (6–6)	**Chapman** (17)	**Yankee Stadium**	36,106	49–44
94	July 21	Phillies	6–5 (10)	**Kriske** (1–0)	Suárez (4–3)	—	**Yankee Stadium**	34,112	50–44
95	July 22	@ Red Sox	4–5 (10)	Barnes (5–2)	**Kriske** (1–1)	—	Fenway Park	34,761	50–45
96	July 23	@ Red Sox	2–6	Ríos (3–0)	**Cole** (10–5)	—	Fenway Park	34,922	50–46
97	July 24	@ Red Sox	4–3	**Taillon** (5–4)	Ottavino (2–3)	**Chapman** (18)	Fenway Park	35,136	51–46
98	July 25	@ Red Sox	4–5	Workman (1–2)	**Loáisiga** (7–4)	Barnes (21)	Fenway Park	32,009	51–47
99	July 27	@ Rays	4–3	**Montgomery** (4–5)	McClanahan (4–4)	**Chapman** (19)	Tropicana Field	12,678	52–47
100	July 28	@ Rays	3–1 (10)	**Green** (4–5)	Fairbanks (3–4)	**Chapman** (20)	Tropicana Field	11,525	53–47
101	July 29	@ Rays	0–14	Patiño (2–2)	**Cole** (10–6)	—	Tropicana Field	14,134	53–48
102	July 30	@ Marlins	3–1	**Taillon** (7–4)	Thompson (2–4)	**Chapman** (21)	loanDepot Park	18,462	54–48
103	July 31	@ Marlins	4–2	**Luetge** (4–1)	Hess (2–1)	**Loáisiga** (3)	loanDepot Park	25,767	55–48

August: 21–8 (Home: 12–2; Away: 9–6)

#	Date	Opponent	Score	Win	Loss	Save	Stadium	Attendance	Record
104	August 1	@ Marlins	3–1	**Rodríguez** (2–3)	Bass (1–6)	**Chapman** (22)	loanDepot Park	20,758	56–48
105	August 2	Orioles	1–7	López (3–12)	**Heaney** (6–8)	—	**Yankee Stadium**	28,879	56–49
106	August 3	Orioles	13–1	**Gil** (1–0)	Wells (1–2)	—	**Yankee Stadium**	30,815	57–49
107	August 4	Orioles	10–3	**Loáisiga** (8–4)	Sulser (3–2)	—	**Yankee Stadium**	30,055	58–49
108	August 5	Mariners	5–3	**Green** (5–5)	Sewald (6–3)	**Chapman** (23)	**Yankee Stadium**	33,211	59–49
109	August 6	Mariners	3–2 (11)	**Abreu** (1–0)	Middleton (0–2)	—	**Yankee Stadium**	43,180	60–49
110	August 7	Mariners	5–4	**Heaney** (7–8)	Misiewicz (3–4)	**Loáisiga** (4)	**Yankee Stadium**	35,165	61–49
111	August 8	Mariners	0–2	Sewald (7–3)	**Luetge** (4–2)	Steckenrider (4)	**Yankee Stadium**	35,437	61–50
112	August 9	@ Royals	8–6 (11)	**Holmes** (4–2)	Holland (2–5)	**Peralta** (3)	Kauffman Stadium	18,477	62–50
113	August 10	@ Royals	4–8	Staumont (2–2)	**Cortés Jr.** (0–1)	—	Kauffman Stadium	18,218	62–51
114	August 11	@ Royals	5–2	**Green** (6–5)	Singer (3–8)	**Britton** (1)	Kauffman Stadium	13,748	63–51
115	August 12†	@ White Sox	8–9	Hendriks (7–2)	**Britton** (0–1)	—	Field of Dreams (Iowa)†	7,832	63–52
116	August 14	@ White Sox	7–5 (10)	**Green** (7–5)	Hendriks (7–3)	**Abreu** (1)	Guaranteed Rate Field	38,477	64–52
117	August 15	@ White Sox	5–3	**Cortés Jr.** (1–1)	Giolito (9–9)	**Peralta** (4)	Guaranteed Rate Field	37,696	65–52
118	August 16	Angels	2–1	**Cole** (11–6)	Suárez (5–6)	**Green** (4)	**Yankee Stadium**	37,010	66–52
119	August 17 (1)	Red Sox	5–3 (7)	**Abreu** (2–0)	Whitlock (4–2)	**Loáisiga** (5)	**Yankee Stadium**	39,078	67–52
120	August 17 (2)	Red Sox	2–0 (7)	**Peralta** (4–2)	Eovaldi (10–8)	**Green** (5)	**Yankee Stadium**	35,237	68–52
121	August 18	Red Sox	5–2	**Heaney** (8–8)	Pivetta (9–6)	**Luetge** (1)	**Yankee Stadium**	39,166	69–52
122	August 19	Twins	7–5	**Taillon** (8–4)	Gant (4–7)	**Green** (6)	**Yankee Stadium**	30,019	70–52
123	August 20	Twins	10–2	**Cortés Jr.** (2–1)	Barnes (0–3)	—	**Yankee Stadium**	39,124	71–52
124	August 21	Twins	7–1	**Cole** (12–6)	Maeda (6–5)	—	**Yankee Stadium**	35,247	72–52
—	August 22	Twins	Postponed (Hurricane Henri, Makeup September 13)						
125	August 23	@ Braves	5–1	**Montgomery** (5–5)	Ynoa (4–3)	—	Truist Park	39,176	73–52
126	August 24	@ Braves	5–4	**Holmes** (5–2)	Morton (12–5)	**Peralta** (5)	Truist Park	37,426	74–52
127	August 26	@ Athletics	7–6	**Loáisiga** (9–4)	Trivino (5–7)	**Chapman** (24)	Oakland Coliseum	8,147	75–52
128	August 27	@ Athletics	8–2	**Cole** (13–6)	Manaea (8–9)	—	Oakland Coliseum	22,463	76–52
129	August 28	@ Athletics	2–3	Montas (10–9)	**Cortés Jr.** (2–2)	Romo (1)	Oakland Coliseum	18,337	76–53
130	August 29	@ Athletics	1–3	Guerra (2–1)	**Green** (7–6)	Chafin (2)	Oakland Coliseum	18,468	76–54
131	August 30	@ Angels	7–8	Guerra (5–2)	**Peralta** (4–3)	Iglesias (28)	Angel Stadium	29,436	76–55
132	August 31	@ Angels	4–6	Herget (1–1)	**Taillon** (8–5)	Iglesias (29)	Angel Stadium	34,813	76–56
†The White Sox were the home team against the Yankees at the Field of Dreams movie site in the inaugural MLB at Field of Dreams game.

September: 15–12 (Home: 6–8; Away: 9–4)

#	Date	Opponent	Score	Win	Loss	Save	Stadium	Attendance	Record
133	September 1	@ Angels	4–1	**Cole** (14–6)	Naughton (0–1)	**Chapman** (25)	Angel Stadium	28,753	77–56
134	September 3	Orioles	4–3 (10)	**Holmes** (6–2)	Tate (0–6)	—	**Yankee Stadium**	34,085	78–56
135	September 4	Orioles	3–4	Sulser (4–3)	**Chapman** (5–4)	—	**Yankee Stadium**	34,571	78–57
136	September 5	Orioles	7–8	Diplán (1–0)	**Heaney** (8–9)	Wells (1)	**Yankee Stadium**	33,091	78–58
137	September 6	Blue Jays	0–8	Ryu (13–8)	**Taillon** (8–6)	—	**Yankee Stadium**	31,196	78–59
138	September 7	Blue Jays	1–5	Matz (11–8)	**Cole** (14–7)	—	**Yankee Stadium**	30,164	78–60
139	September 8	Blue Jays	3–6	Richards (6–2)	**Holmes** (6–3)	Romano (16)	**Yankee Stadium**	25,873	78–61
140	September 9	Blue Jays	4–6	Berríos (11–7)	**Romano** (0–2)	—	**Yankee Stadium**	30,112	78–62
141	September 10	@ Mets	3–10	Megill (3–4)	**Montgomery** (5–6)	—	Citi Field	37,288	78–63
142	September 11	@ Mets	8–7	**Holmes** (7–3)	May (7–3)	**Chapman** (26)	Citi Field	43,144	79–63
143	September 12	@ Mets	6–7	Lugo (4–2)	**Green** (7–7)	Díaz (29)	Citi Field	33,805	79–64
144	September 13	Twins	6–5 (10)	**Holmes** (8–3)	Garza Jr. (1–3)	—	**Yankee Stadium**	31,528	80–64
145	September 14	@ Orioles	7–2	**Cole** (15–7)	Wells (1–3)	—	Camden Yards	10,235	81–64
146	September 15	@ Orioles	4–3	**Peralta** (5–3)	Wells (2–3)	**Chapman** (27)	Camden Yards	10,402	82–64
147	September 16	@ Orioles	2–3 (10)	Sulser (5–4)	**Peralta** (5–4)	—	Camden Yards	20,164	82–65
148	September 17	Indians	8–0	**Kluber** (5–3)	Plesac (10–6)	—	**Yankee Stadium**	31,403	83–65
149	September 18	Indians	3–11	Civale (11–4)	**Gil** (1–1)	—	**Yankee Stadium**	39,088	83–66
150	September 19	Indians	1–11	Morgan (3–7)	**Cole** (15–8)	—	**Yankee Stadium**	34,110	83–67
151	September 20	Rangers	4–3	**Green** (8–7)	Alexy (2–1)	**Chapman** (28)	**Yankee Stadium**	22,160	84–67
152	September 21	Rangers	7–1	**Montgomery** (6–6)	Dunning (5–9)	—	**Yankee Stadium**	23,335	85–67
153	September 22	Rangers	7–3	**Green** (9–7)	Patton (1–2)	—	**Yankee Stadium**	25,170	86–67
154	September 24	@ Red Sox	8–3	**Cole** (16–8)	Eovaldi (10–9)	—	Fenway Park	36,026	87–67
155	September 25	@ Red Sox	5–3	**Severino** (1–0)	Houck (1–5)	**Chapman** (29)	Fenway Park	36,103	88–67
156	September 26	@ Red Sox	6–3	**Green** (10–7)	Richards (7–8)	**Chapman** (30)	Fenway Park	36,312	89–67
157	September 28	@ Blue Jays	7–2	**King** (1–4)	Ryu (13–10)	—	Rogers Centre	28,769	90–67
158	September 29	@ Blue Jays	5–6	Cimber (3–4)	**Holmes** (8–4)	Romano (22)	Rogers Centre	29,601	90–68
159	September 30	@ Blue Jays	6–2	**King** (2–4)	Ray (13–7)	—	Rogers Centre	29,659	91–68

October: 1–2 (Home: 1–2; Away: 0–0)

#	Date	Opponent	Score	Win	Loss	Save	Stadium	Attendance	Record
160	October 1	Rays	3–4	Head (2–0)	**Cortés Jr.** (2–3)	Kittredge (8)	**Yankee Stadium**	41,469	91–69
161	October 2	Rays	2–12	Patiño (5–3)	**Montgomery** (6–7)	—	**Yankee Stadium**	41,648	91–70
162	October 3	Rays	1–0	**Chapman** (6–4)	Fleming (10–8)	—	**Yankee Stadium**	40,409	92–70

== Player stats ==
=== Batting ===
Note: G = Games played; AB = At bats; R = Runs; H = Hits; 2B = Doubles; 3B = Triples; HR = Home runs; RBI = Runs batted in; SB = Stolen bases; BB = Walks; AVG = Batting average; SLG = Slugging average

Player	G	AB	R	H	2B	3B	HR	RBI	SB	BB	AVG	SLG
DJ LeMahieu	150	597	84	160	24	1	10	57	4	73	.268	.362
Aaron Judge	148	550	89	158	24	0	39	98	6	75	.287	.544
Giancarlo Stanton	139	510	64	139	19	0	35	97	0	63	.273	.516
Gleyber Torres	127	459	50	119	22	0	9	51	14	50	.259	.366
Gio Urshela	116	420	42	112	18	2	14	49	1	20	.267	.419
Brett Gardner	140	387	47	86	16	4	10	39	4	60	.222	.362
Gary Sánchez	117	383	54	78	13	1	23	54	0	52	.204	.423
Rougned Odor	102	322	42	65	12	0	15	39	0	27	.202	.379
Luke Voit	68	213	26	51	7	1	11	35	0	21	.239	.437
Kyle Higashioka	67	193	20	35	10	0	10	29	0	17	.181	.389
Joey Gallo	58	188	33	30	7	0	13	22	0	37	.160	.404
Clint Frazier	60	183	20	34	9	0	5	15	2	32	.186	.317
Anthony Rizzo	49	173	32	43	7	0	8	21	2	16	.249	.428
Miguel Andújar	45	154	19	39	2	0	6	12	0	7	.253	.383
Tyler Wade	103	127	31	34	5	1	0	5	17	16	.268	.323
Aaron Hicks	32	108	13	21	3	0	4	14	0	14	.194	.333
Andrew Velazquez	28	67	11	15	4	1	1	6	4	1	.224	.358
Mike Ford	22	60	6	8	0	0	3	5	0	11	.133	.283
Greg Allen	15	37	9	10	4	1	0	2	5	5	.270	.432
Chris Gittens	16	36	1	4	0	0	1	5	0	7	.111	.194
Jay Bruce	10	34	3	4	1	0	1	3	0	5	.118	.235
Ryan LaMarre	9	21	3	4	0	0	2	4	1	2	.190	.476
Tim Locastro	9	21	4	4	2	0	1	2	0	1	.190	.429
Estevan Florial	11	20	3	6	2	0	1	2	1	5	.300	.550
Rob Brantly	6	20	0	3	1	0	0	0	0	0	.150	.200
Jonathan Davis	12	17	4	1	0	0	0	0	0	1	.059	.059
Mike Tauchman	11	14	1	3	1	0	0	0	2	1	.214	.286
Trey Amburgey	2	4	0	0	0	0	0	0	0	0	.000	.000
Hoy Park	1	1	0	0	0	0	0	0	0	0	.000	.000
Pitcher totals	162	12	0	0	0	0	0	0	0	2	.000	.000
Team totals	162	5331	711	1266	213	12	222	666	63	621	.237	.407

=== Pitching ===
Note: W = Wins; L = Losses; ERA = Earned run average; G = Games pitched; GS = Games started; SV = Saves; IP = Innings pitched; H = Hits allowed; R = Runs allowed; ER = Earned runs allowed; BB = Walks allowed; SO = Strikeouts

Player	W	L	ERA	G	GS	SV	IP	H	R	ER	BB	SO
Gerrit Cole	16	8	3.23	30	30	0	181.1	151	69	65	41	243
Jordan Montgomery	6	7	3.83	30	30	0	157.1	150	73	67	51	162
Jameson Taillon	8	6	4.30	29	29	0	144.1	130	73	69	44	140
Domingo Germán	4	5	4.58	22	18	0	98.1	89	52	50	27	98
Nestor Cortés Jr.	2	3	2.90	22	14	0	93.0	75	32	30	25	103
Chad Green	10	7	3.12	67	0	6	83.2	57	32	29	17	99
Corey Kluber	5	3	3.83	16	16	0	80.0	74	37	34	33	82
Lucas Luetge	4	2	2.74	57	1	1	72.1	67	30	22	15	78
Jonathan Loáisiga	9	4	2.17	57	0	5	70.2	56	19	17	16	69
Michael King	2	4	3.55	22	6	0	63.1	57	29	25	24	62
Aroldis Chapman	6	4	3.36	61	0	30	56.1	36	23	21	38	97
Wandy Peralta	3	3	2.95	46	1	3	42.2	38	19	14	18	35
Luis Cessa	3	1	2.82	29	0	0	38.1	31	17	12	17	31
Albert Abreu	2	0	5.15	28	0	1	36.2	27	21	21	19	35
Andrew Heaney	2	2	7.32	12	5	0	35.2	38	29	29	10	37
Luis Gil	1	1	3.07	6	6	0	29.1	20	11	10	19	38
Clay Holmes	5	2	1.61	25	0	0	28.0	18	8	5	4	34
Joely Rodríguez	1	0	2.84	21	0	0	19.0	21	8	6	6	17
Zach Britton	0	1	5.89	22	0	1	18.1	17	14	12	14	16
Justin Wilson	1	1	7.50	21	0	0	18.0	18	17	15	9	15
Nick Nelson	0	2	8.79	11	2	0	14.1	15	16	14	16	22
Darren O'Day	0	0	3.38	12	0	0	10.2	9	4	4	4	11
Deivi García	0	2	6.48	2	2	0	8.1	8	7	6	4	7
Brooks Kriske	1	1	15.26	8	0	0	7.2	12	14	13	6	7
Clarke Schmidt	0	0	5.68	2	1	0	6.1	11	8	4	5	6
Luis Severino	1	0	0.00	4	0	0	6.0	2	0	0	1	8
Stephen Ridings	0	0	1.80	5	0	0	5.0	4	2	1	2	7
Asher Wojciechowski	0	0	4.50	1	1	0	4.0	3	2	2	3	4
Sal Romano	0	1	5.40	4	0	0	3.1	7	2	2	2	5
Brody Koerner	0	0	3.00	2	0	0	3.0	2	1	1	2	1
Team totals	92	70	3.74	162	162	47	1435.1	1243	669	596	492	1569

=== No-hitters ===
Date	Pitcher	Catcher	Opposing team	Final score
May 19	Corey Kluber	Kyle Higashioka	Texas Rangers	2–0 (Away)

=== Grand slams ===
Date	Batter	Pitcher	Opposing team	Final score
April 5	Giancarlo Stanton	Shawn Armstrong	Baltimore Orioles	7–0 (Home)
April 30	Aaron Judge	Buck Farmer	Detroit Tigers	10–0 (Home)
September 5	Gary Sánchez	Keegan Akin	Baltimore Orioles	7–8 (Home)
September 25	Giancarlo Stanton	Darwinzon Hernandez	Boston Red Sox	5–3 (Away)

== Postseason ==
=== Postseason game log ===
2021 Postseason game log (0−1) (Home 0−0; Away 0−1)
American League Wild Card Game: 0−1

#	Date	Opponent	Stadium	Score	Win	Loss	Save	Attendance	Record
1	October 5	@ Red Sox	Fenway Park	2–6	Eovaldi (1−0)	Cole (0−1)	—	38,324	0–1

=== Postseason rosters ===
Playoff rosters
American League Wild Card Game

- Pitchers: 30 Joely Rodríguez 35 Clay Holmes 40 Luis Severino 43 Jonathan Loáisiga 45 Gerrit Cole 54 Aroldis Chapman 55 Domingo Germán 57 Chad Green 58 Wandy Peralta 63 Lucas Luetge 65 Nestor Cortés Jr. 73 Michael King
- Catchers: 24 Gary Sánchez 62 Rob Brantly 66 Kyle Higashioka
- Infielders: 12 Rougned Odor 14 Tyler Wade 25 Gleyber Torres 29 Gio Urshela 48 Anthony Rizzo 71 Andrew Velazquez
- Outfielders: 11 Brett Gardner 13 Joey Gallo 22 Greg Allen 99 Aaron Judge
- Designated hitters: 27 Giancarlo Stanton

== Roster ==
2021 New York Yankees
Roster
Pitchers: 84 Albert Abreu; 53 Zack Britton; 85 Luis Cessa; 54 Aroldis Chapman; 45 Gerrit Cole; 65 Nestor Cortés Jr.; 83 Deivi García; 55 Domingo Germán; 81 Luis Gil; 57 Chad Green; 38 Andrew Heaney; 35 Clay Holmes; 73 Michael King; 28 Corey Kluber; 61 Brody Koerner; 82 Brooks Kriske; 43 Jonathan Loáisiga; 63 Lucas Luetge; 47 Jordan Montgomery; 79 Nick Nelson; 56 Darren O'Day; 58 Wandy Peralta; 70 Stephen Ridings; 30 Joely Rodríguez; 68 Sal Romano; 86 Clarke Schmidt; 40 Luis Severino; 50 Jameson Taillon; 34 Justin Wilson; 61 Asher Wojciechowski	Catchers: 62 Rob Brantly; 66 Kyle Higashioka; 24 Gary Sánchez; Infielders: 30 Jay Bruce; 36 Mike Ford; 92 Chris Gittens; 26 DJ LeMahieu; 12,18 Rougned Odor; 48 Anthony Rizzo; 25 Gleyber Torres; 29 Gio Urshela; 71 Andrew Velazquez; 59 Luke Voit; 14 Tyler Wade	Outfielders: 22 Greg Allen; 95 Trey Amburgey; 41 Miguel Andújar; 36 Jonathan Davis; 90 Estevan Florial; 77 Clint Frazier; 13 Joey Gallo; 11 Brett Gardner; 31 Aaron Hicks; 99 Aaron Judge; 39 Ryan LaMarre; 33 Tim Locastro; 98 Hoy Park; 27 Giancarlo Stanton; 39 Mike Tauchman	Manager: 17 Aaron Boone; Coaches: 67 Matt Blake (pitching); -- Radley Haddad (bullpen catcher); 60 Mike Harkey (bullpen); 64 Carlos Mendoza (bench/infield); 88 Phil Nevin (third base); 74 P. J. Pilittere (asst. hitting); 76 Tanner Swanson (quality control/catching); 72 Marcus Thames (hitting); -- Brett Weber (assistant coach/instant replay); 75 Reggie Willits (first base/outfield)

== Awards and honors ==
Recipient	Award	Ref.
Corey Kluber	AL Player of the Week (April 26–May 2)	
Gerrit Cole	AL Pitcher of the Month (April)	
Aaron Judge	AL Player of the Week (May 10–16)	
Corey Kluber	AL Player of the Week (May 17–23)	
Luke Voit	AL Player of the Week (August 16–22)	

== Farm system ==
Level	Team	League	Manager
AAA	Scranton/Wilkes-Barre RailRiders	Triple-A East	Doug Davis
AA	Somerset Patriots	Double-A Northeast	Julio Mosquera
High-A	Hudson Valley Renegades	High-A East	David Adams
Low-A	Tampa Tarpons	Low-A Southeast	Luis Dorante
Rookie	FCL Yankees	Florida Complex League	
Rookie	DSL Yankees 1	Dominican Summer League	Caonabo Cosme
Rookie	DSL Yankees 2	Dominican Summer League	Caonabo Cosme
