= Brody Koerner =

American baseball player (born 1993)

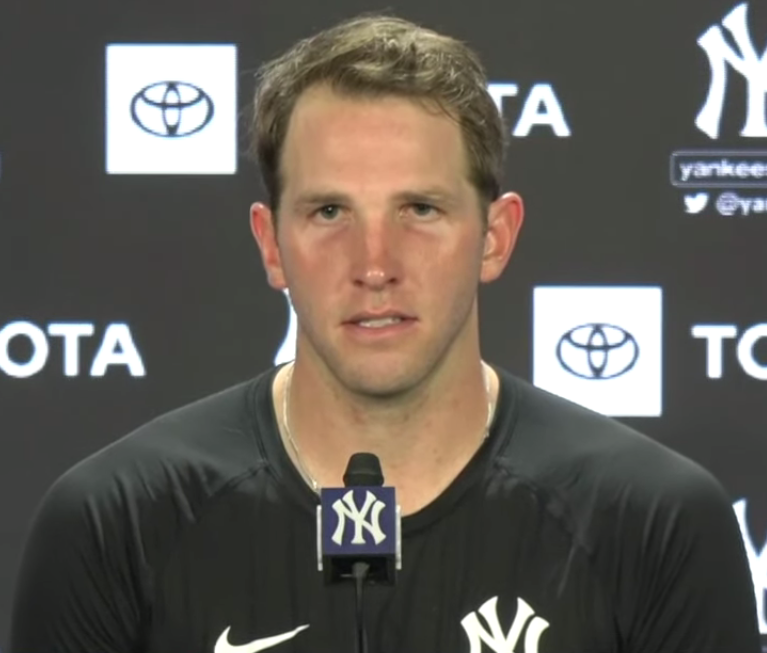
- Koerner following his MLB debut on August 3, 2021
- Pitcher
- Born: October 17, 1993 (age 32); Winchester, Virginia, U.S.
- Batted: Right Threw: Right

MLB debut
- August 3, 2021, for the New York Yankees

Last MLB appearance
- August 20, 2021, for the New York Yankees

MLB statistics
- Win–loss record: 0–0
- Earned run average: 3.00
- Strikeouts: 1
- Stats at Baseball Reference

Teams
- New York Yankees (2021)

Brody Tyler Koerner (born October 17, 1993) is an American former professional baseball pitcher. He played in Major League Baseball (MLB) for the New York Yankees.

== Career ==
Koerner attended Jay M. Robinson High School in Concord, North Carolina. He then spent three seasons with the Clemson Tigers. While there he was a three-time ACC Academic Roll member and had 100 strikeouts in 97.2 innings pitched over 31 appearances (19 starts) in his Clemson career (2013-15). In 2015 he pitched the best game of his college career, a four-hit shutout with seven strikeouts at No. 8 South Carolina on March 2. Later that year he was drafted by the New York Yankees in the 17th round of the 2015 Major League Baseball draft.

=== New York Yankees ===
In six minor league seasons at every level of the Yankee organization, Koerner was 24-20 with eight saves, a 3.79 ERA and 322 strikeouts in 434 innings pitched over 108 appearances (65 starts). He joined Gigantes del Cibao of the Dominican winter League during their 2019-20 season, leading all the teams starting pitchers with a 2.17 ERA over seven starts.

Koerner was called up by the Yankees on August 3, 2021, and made his major league debut the same night. He pitched the final two innings, allowing two hits and one run in the Yankees' 13-1 victory. Luis Gil started the game and Stephen Ridings also pitched. It was only the second time that three pitchers debuted in the same game for the Yankees, previously occurring on September 26, 1950. Koerner appeared in 2 games for the Yankees, posting an ERA of 3.00 with one strikeout. On August 21, Koerner was optioned to Triple-A Scranton. On August 26, Koerner was removed from the 40-man roster and sent outright to the RailRiders. On October 3, Koerner was re-selected to the 40-man roster, but was designated for assignment two days later prior to the team's Wild Card game appearance. On October 13, Koerner elected free agency.

=== Tecolotes de los Dos Laredos ===
On April 20, 2022, Koerner signed with the Tecolotes de los Dos Laredos of the Mexican League. He made one start, pitching 5 innings and giving up 2 earned runs.

=== Chicago White Sox ===
On May 3, 2022, Koerner signed a minor league contract with the Chicago White Sox. He made nine appearances (four starts) for the Triple-A Charlotte Knights, but struggled to an 0-5 record and 10.57 ERA with 22 strikeouts over 23 innings of work. Koerner was released by the White Sox organization on June 3.
