= Hoy Park =

South Korean baseball player (born 1996)

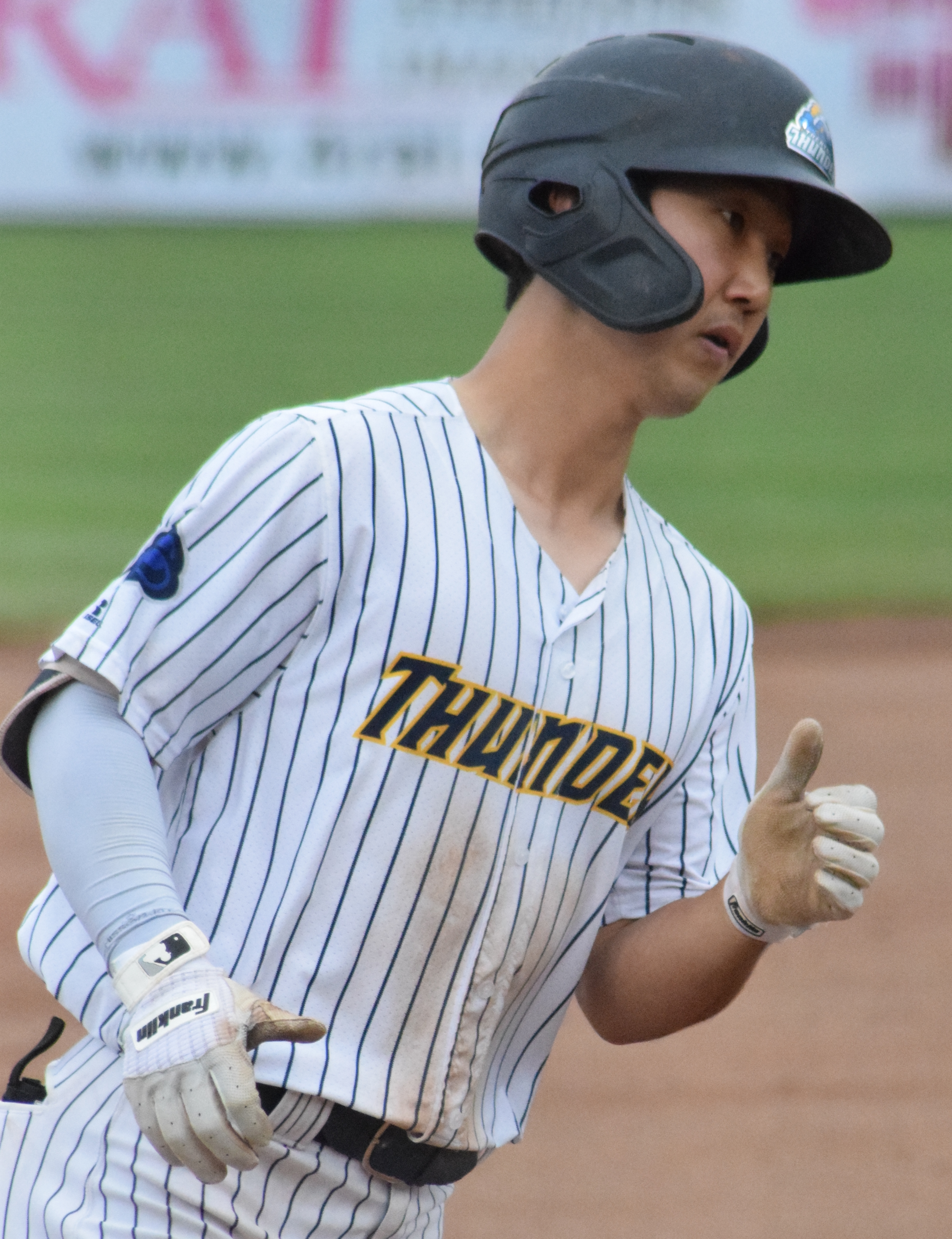
- Park with the Trenton Thunder in 2019
- Second baseman / Third baseman
- Born: April 7, 1996 (age 30); Seoul, South Korea
- Batted: Left Threw: Right

MLB debut
- July 16, 2021, for the New York Yankees

Last MLB appearance
- September 7, 2022, for the Pittsburgh Pirates

MLB statistics
- Batting average: .201
- Home runs: 5
- Runs batted in: 20
- Stats at Baseball Reference

Teams
- New York Yankees (2021); Pittsburgh Pirates (2021–2022)

- Hoy Park
- Hangul: 박효준
- RR: Bak Hyojun
- MR: Pak Hyojun

Hoy Jun Park (Korean: 박효준; born April 7, 1996) is a South Korean former professional baseball infielder. He played in Major League Baseball (MLB) for the New York Yankees and Pittsburgh Pirates. He signed with the Yankees as an international free agent in 2014 and made his MLB debut in 2021.

== Career ==
=== New York Yankees ===
On July 2, 2014, Park signed with the New York Yankees organization as an international free agent. He made his professional debut in 2015 with the rookie-level Pulaski Yankees, compiling a .239/.351/.383 slash line in 56 games. He spent the 2016 season with the Class A Charleston RiverDogs, slashing .225/.336/.329 with 2 home runs and 34 runs batted in (RBIs). Park split 2017 between Charleston and the Class A-Advanced Tampa Yankees, posting a cumulative .251/.348/.359 slash line with career-highs in home runs (7) and RBIs (39). Park returned to Tampa for the 2018 season, hitting .258/.387/.349 with 6 home runs and 34 RBIs in 103 games. In 2019, Park played with the Double-A Trenton Thunder, logging a .272/.363/.370 slash line with 3 home runs and a career-high 41 RBIs.

Park did not play professionally in 2020 due to the cancellation of the minor league season because of the COVID-19 pandemic. He started the 2021 season with the Double-A Somerset Patriots before being promoted to the Triple-A Scranton/Wilkes-Barre RailRiders. On July 15, 2021, Park was added to the Yankees’ taxi squad following a COVID-19 outbreak in the major-league club. The following day, Park was added to the team's 40-man roster and promoted to the major leagues for the first time. Park made his MLB debut the same day against the Boston Red Sox as a pinch hitter for Tim Locastro, grounding out in his only at bat. That was his only plate appearance with the Yankees before he was outrighted off of the 40-man roster on July 21.

=== Pittsburgh Pirates ===
On July 26, 2021, the Yankees traded Park and Diego Castillo to the Pittsburgh Pirates in exchange for Clay Holmes. He was then assigned to the Triple-A Indianapolis Indians. The Pirates promoted Park to the major leagues on July 31. The next day, playing against the Philadelphia Phillies, Park hit a double for his first major league hit. On August 10, Park hit his first major league home run off of St. Louis Cardinals starter J. A. Happ. On August 23, after going hitless in his previous 20 at-bats, Park was optioned to the Indianapolis Indians.

Park was recalled on August 31 after Michael Chavis was placed on the injured list. On April 22, 2022, he was optioned to Triple-A Indianapolis after batting .214 playing 5 games in the majors to start the season. When Ben Gamel was placed on the injured list on May 29, Park was recalled. On May 30, after only pinch running once, Park was sent down to Triple-A Indianapolis to make room for Yu Chang. On June 13, the Pirates recalled Hoy Park from Triple-A. On November 22, Park was designated for assignment.

=== Atlanta Braves ===
On November 23, 2022, the Pirates traded Park to the Boston Red Sox in exchange for minor-league left-handed pitcher Inmer Lobo. Park was designated for assignment on December 13 after the Red Sox added Kenley Jansen to their roster. On December 16, the Red Sox traded Park to the Atlanta Braves in exchange for a player to be named later or cash considerations. On December 28, 2022, Park was designated for assignment to make room for Eli White on the 40-man roster. On January 5, 2023, Park was sent outright to the Triple-A Gwinnett Stripers. He spent the year with Gwinnett, hitting .262/.385/.379 with six home runs, 42 RBI, and 16 stolen bases across 101 games. Park elected free agency following the season on November 6.

=== Oakland Athletics ===
On November 20, 2023, Park signed a minor league contract with the Oakland Athletics. He led the team during spring training with 21 hits in 22 games as a non-roster invitee. Despite the strong play, Park was sent to the Triple-A Las Vegas Aviators to begin the season. He elected free agency on November 6.
