= Brooks Kriske =

American baseball player (born 1994)

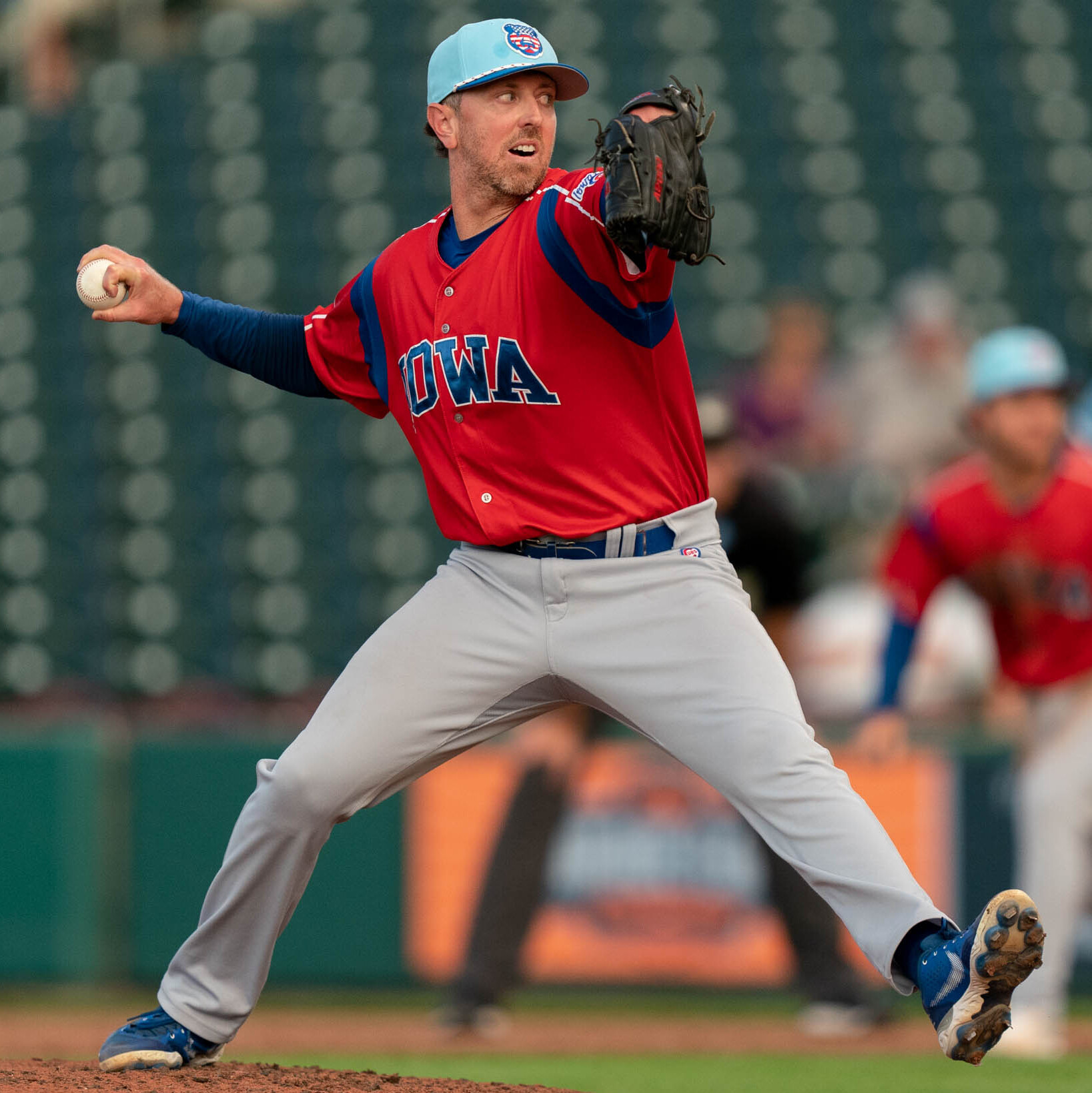
- Kriske with the Iowa Cubs in 2025

Free agent
- Pitcher
- Born: February 3, 1994 (age 32); Scottsdale, Arizona, U.S.
- Bats: Right Throws: Right

Professional debut
- MLB: July 29, 2020, for the New York Yankees
- NPB: April 12, 2022, for the Yokohama DeNA BayStars

MLB statistics (through 2026 season)
- Win–loss record: 2–2
- Earned run average: 8.93
- Strikeouts: 45

NPB statistics (through 2023 season)
- Win–loss record: 1–1
- Earned run average: 2.31
- Strikeouts: 39
- Stats at Baseball Reference

Teams
- New York Yankees (2020–2021); Baltimore Orioles (2021); Yokohama DeNA BayStars (2022); Kansas City Royals (2023); Saitama Seibu Lions (2023); Chicago Cubs (2025); Minnesota Twins (2025); Athletics (2026)

Brooks Joseph Kriske (/ˈkrɪski/ KRIS-kee; born February 3, 1994) is an American professional baseball pitcher who is a free agent. He has previously played in Major League Baseball (MLB) for the New York Yankees, Baltimore Orioles, Kansas City Royals, Chicago Cubs, Minnesota Twins, and Athletics, and in Nippon Professional Baseball (NPB) for the Yokohama DeNA BayStars and Saitama Seibu Lions.

== Amateur career ==
Kriske played all four years of varsity baseball at Palm Desert High School in Palm Desert, California. He helped his team to three consecutive California Interscholastic Federation (CIF) State Finals from 2010–2012, winning the CIF state championships in 2010 and 2012. Kriske pitched a complete-game shutout in the final in 2012. He was a two-time All State selection.

Kriske attended the University of Southern California (USC) and played college baseball for the USC Trojans. He was drafted by the New York Yankees in the sixth round of the 2016 MLB draft.

== Professional career ==
=== New York Yankees ===
Kriske began his professional career in 2016 with the Staten Island Yankees. He underwent Tommy John surgery that year, and subsequently missed the 2017 season. He was an all-star in the Florida State League pitching for the Tampa Tarpons before being promoted to Double-A with the Trenton Thunder. The Yankees added him to their 40-man roster after the 2019 season, before being optioned to the Scranton/Wilkes-Barre RailRiders of Triple-A in March 2020.

Kriske was added to the Yankees' active roster on July 26, 2020. He made his major league debut on July 29 against the Baltimore Orioles, striking out two batters and walking one in an inning of relief. For the shortened 2020 season, Kriske appeared in four games without registering a decision, while pitching to a 14.73 earned run average (ERA) while striking out eight batters in 3 2/3 innings.

Kriske began the 2021 season in Triple-A with the RailRiders. He was recalled by the Yankees twice in June and once in July. On July 21, Kriske recorded his first major league win, throwing a scoreless 10th inning against the Philadelphia Phillies, as the Yankees scored in the bottom half of the inning to win. The next day, Kriske was again used in extra innings, this time in a save situation against the Boston Red Sox. However, he blew the save and took the loss, tying the MLB regular-season record by throwing four wild pitches in the inning. He was optioned to Triple-A after the game. On September 14, the Yankees designated Kriske for assignment.

=== Baltimore Orioles ===
Kriske was claimed off waivers by the Baltimore Orioles two days later on September 16 and sent to the Norfolk Tides. After pitching a scoreless inning in his only Tides appearance, he was promoted to the Orioles on September 19. He made his Orioles debut in a 4–3 loss to the Philadelphia Phillies at Citizens Bank Park on September 22. The only batter he faced was Andrew McCutchen whose foul out to the catcher stranded two base runners to end the seventh inning. After appearing in four games with a 12.27 ERA in 3 2/3 innings, Kriske requested, and was granted his release to pursue an international opportunity on November 30.

=== Yokohama DeNA BayStars ===
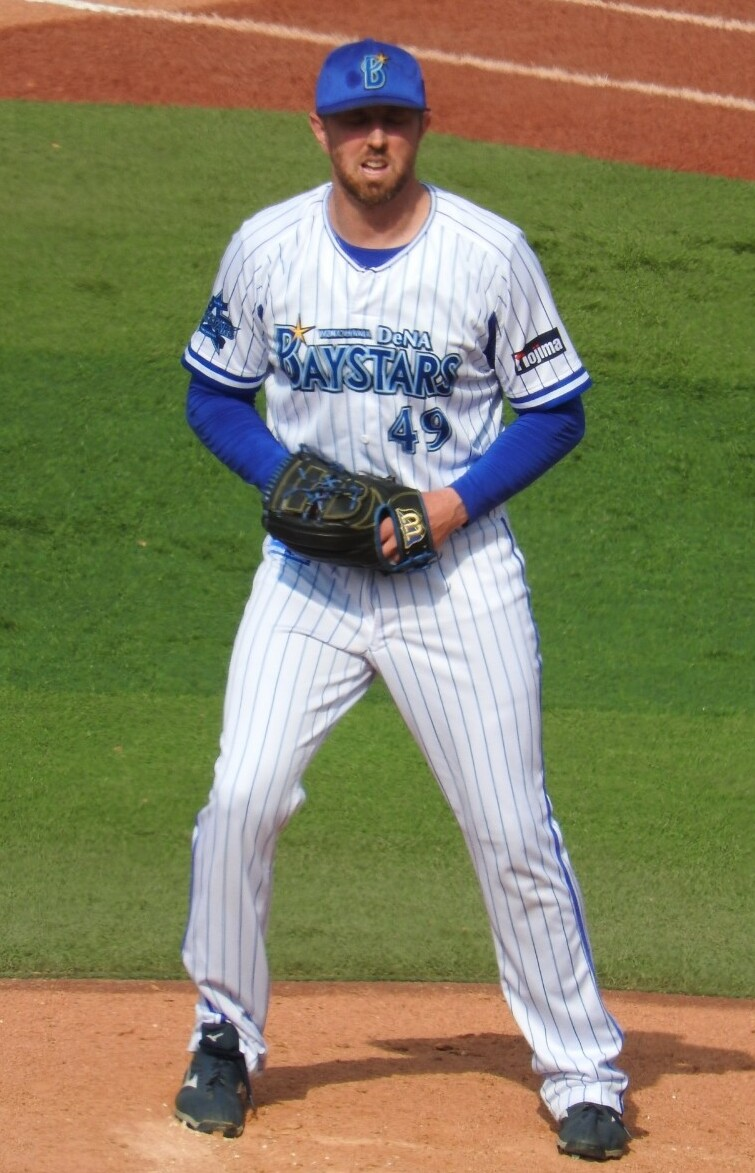
Kriske with the BayStars in 2022

On December 8, 2021, Kriske signed with the Yokohama DeNA BayStars of Nippon Professional Baseball. Kriske made 18 appearances for the BayStars in 2022, compiling a 1-1 record and 2.57 ERA with 26 strikeouts and one save over 21 innings of work.

=== Kansas City Royals ===
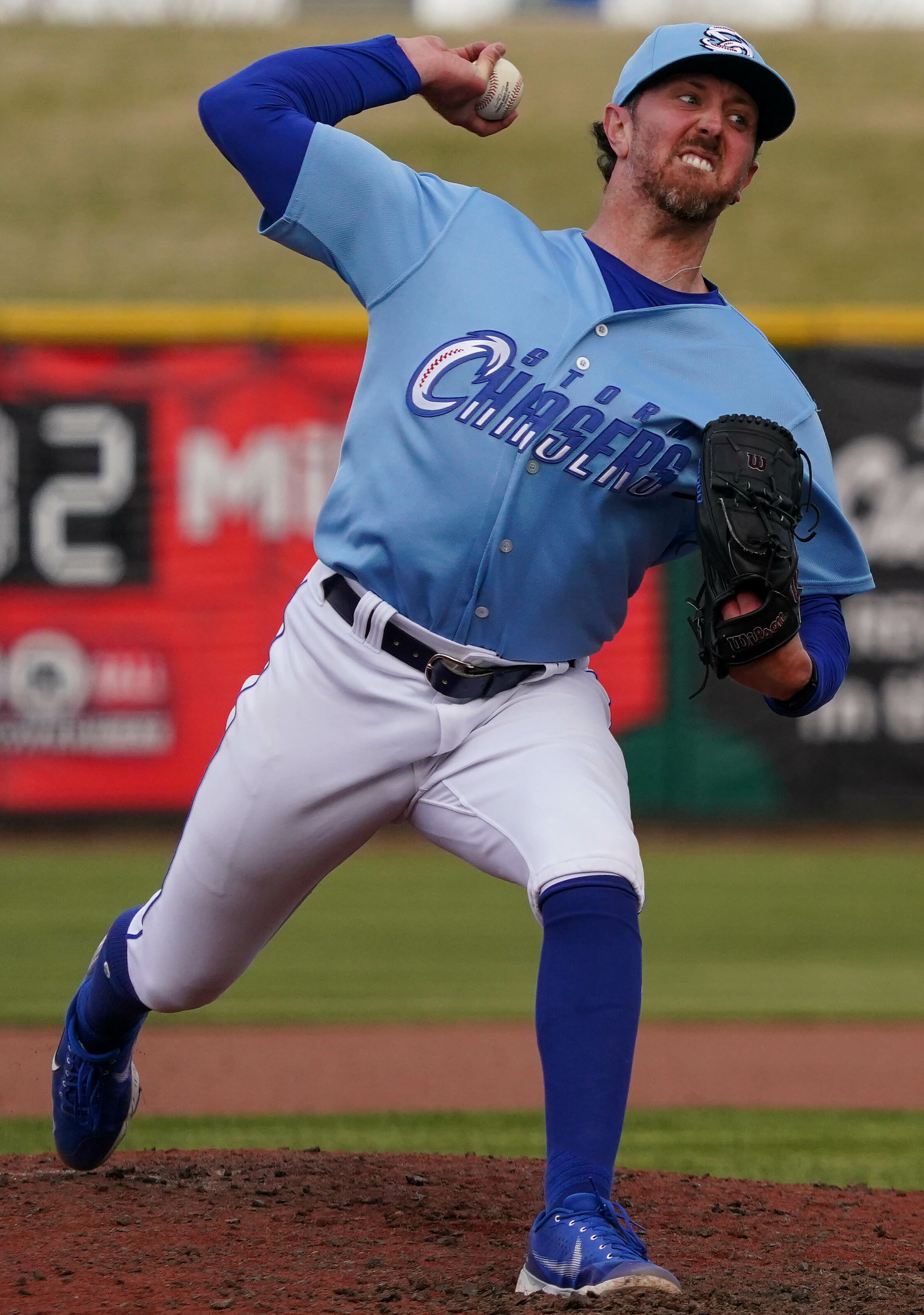
Kriske with the Omaha Storm Chasers in 2023

On December 15, 2022, Kriske signed a minor league deal with the Kansas City Royals. He was assigned to the Triple-A Omaha Storm Chasers to begin the 2023 season, posting a 6.00 ERA with 47 strikeouts and 5 saves in 27.0 innings pitched. On June 18, 2023, Kriske had his contract selected to the major league roster. In 4 games for the Royals, he recorded a 4.05 ERA with 6 strikeouts in 6 2/3 innings pitched. On July 21, Kriske requested and was granted his released by the Royals to continue his career in Japan.

=== Saitama Seibu Lions ===
On July 26, 2023, Kriske signed a $320,000 contract with the Saitama Seibu Lions of Nippon Professional Baseball. In 14 appearances for Saitama, he recorded a 1.93 ERA with 13 strikeouts and seven saves across 14 innings pitched. Kriske became a free agent after the season.

=== Cincinnati Reds ===
On December 21, 2023, Kriske signed a minor league contract with the Cincinnati Reds. On June 17, 2024, the Reds added Kriske to their 40–man roster to prevent him from exercising the opt–out clause in his contract. In 42 appearances for the Triple–A Louisville Bats, he compiled a 5–0 record and 3.10 ERA with 72 strikeouts across 49 1/3 innings pitched. Kriske was designated for assignment following the signing of Dominic Smith on August 22.

=== Baltimore Orioles (second stint) ===
On August 25, 2024, Kriske was claimed off waivers by the Baltimore Orioles. In 8 games for the Triple–A Norfolk Tides, he posted a 5.00 ERA with 9 strikeouts across 9 innings pitched. Kriske elected free agency following the season on October 31.

=== Chicago Cubs ===
On November 29, 2024, Kriske signed a minor league contract with the Chicago Cubs. He made 13 appearances for the Triple-A Iowa Cubs, logging a 2-0 record and 3.38 ERA with 28 strikeouts across 18 2/3 innings pitched. On May 24, 2025, the Cubs selected Kriske's contract, adding him to their active roster. He made one scoreless appearance for Chicago, striking out one batter in two innings against the Cincinnati Reds. Kriske was designated for assignment by the Cubs on May 29. He cleared waivers and was sent outright to Triple-A Iowa on June 5. On July 12, the Cubs added Kriske back to their active roster. He was designated for assignment on August 2, following three more scoreless appearances for Chicago.

=== Minnesota Twins ===
On August 5, 2025, Kriske was claimed off waivers by the Minnesota Twins. In 11 appearances for the Twins, he struggled to an 0-1 record and 11.70 ERA with 11 strikeouts over 10 innings of work. Kriske was designated for assignment by Minnesota on September 7. He cleared waivers and was sent outright to the Triple-A St. Paul Saints on September 9. Kriske elected free agency on September 29.

=== Athletics ===
On December 12, 2025, Kriske signed a minor league contract with the Athletics. He was assigned to the Triple-A Las Vegas Aviators to begin the regular season, where he posted a 4-1 record and 2.25 ERA with 25 strikeouts over 10 appearances. On May 6, 2026, the Athletics selected Kriske's contract, adding him to their active roster. He made two scorelsss appearances for the team before being placed on the injured list due to a right shoulder impingement on May 13. Kriske was transferred to the 60-day injured list on June 2.

== Personal life ==
Kriske is named after Brooks Robinson.
