= Chad Green (pitcher) =

American baseball player (born 1991)

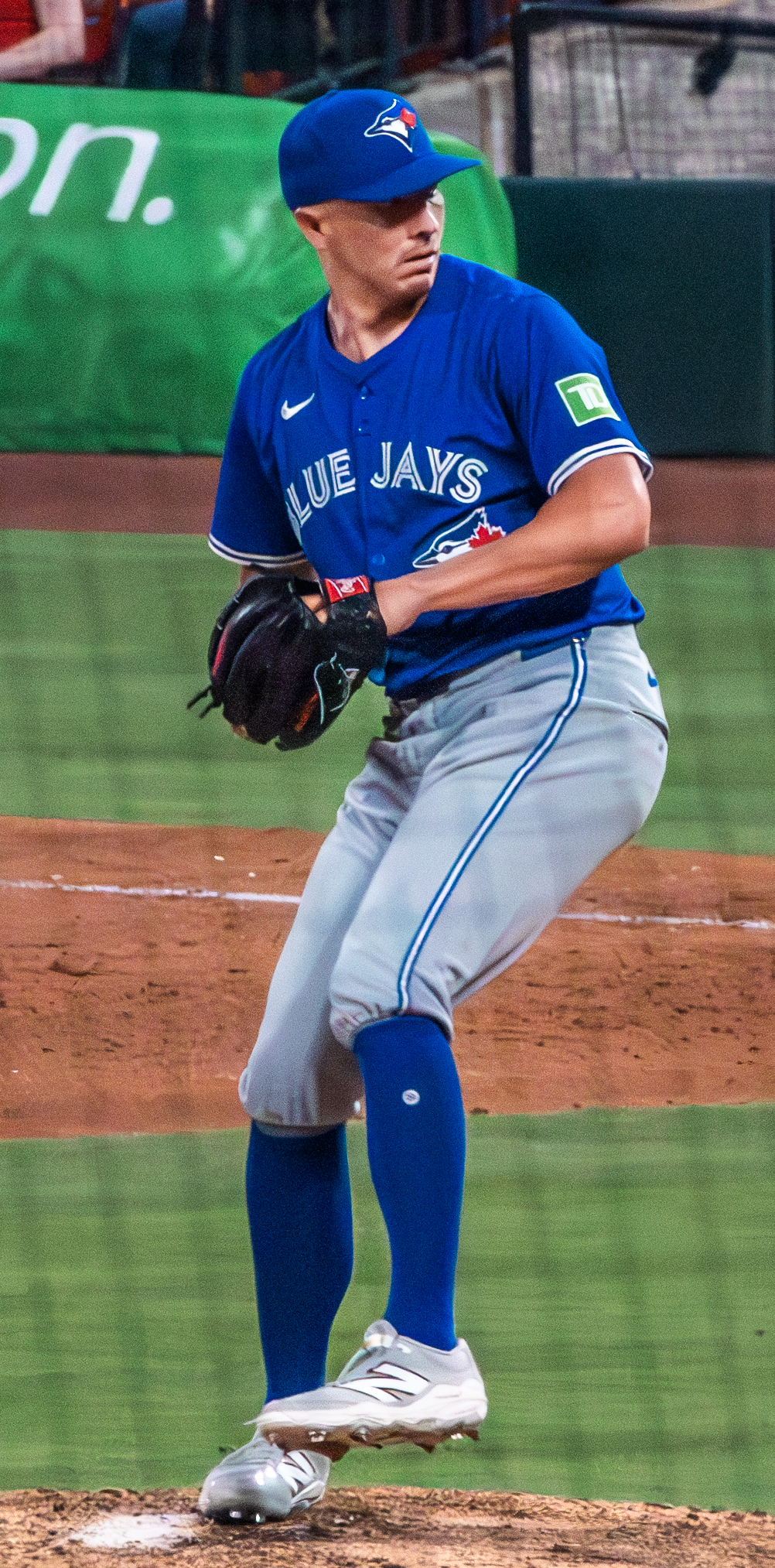
- Green with the Toronto Blue Jays
- Pitcher
- Born: May 24, 1991 (age 35); Greenville, South Carolina, U.S.
- Batted: Left Threw: Right

MLB debut
- May 16, 2016, for the New York Yankees

Last MLB appearance
- July 29, 2025, for the Toronto Blue Jays

MLB statistics (through 2025 season)
- Win–loss record: 43–30
- Earned run average: 3.43
- Strikeouts: 591
- Stats at Baseball Reference

Teams
- New York Yankees (2016–2022); Toronto Blue Jays (2023–2025)

Chad Keith Green (born May 24, 1991) is an American former professional baseball pitcher. He played in Major League Baseball (MLB) for the New York Yankees and Toronto Blue Jays.

== Early life ==
Green was born in Greenville, South Carolina to Howard and Sheena Green. He has a twin brother, Chase, who played shortstop for Southern Illinois University Edwardsville, as well as an older sister, Lynsie, and an older brother, Blake.

Green was a three-time All-Apollo Conference selection, a two-time All-Area honoree and an All-State selection as a senior for Effingham High School in Effingham, Illinois. He was drafted by the Toronto Blue Jays in the 37th round of the 2010 MLB draft from high school, but did not sign. Instead, Green enrolled at the University of Louisville, where he played college baseball for the Louisville Cardinals. He left as the school record holder in career earned run average (ERA), at 2.38. In 2011 and 2012, he played collegiate summer baseball with the Bourne Braves of the Cape Cod Baseball League.

== Professional career ==
=== Detroit Tigers ===
The Detroit Tigers selected Green in the 11th round of the 2013 MLB draft. He made his professional debut that year with the Gulf Coast League Tigers, and after two games, was promoted to the Lakeland Flying Tigers where he finished the year with a 3–0 record and a 3.63 ERA in 17 1/3 innings pitched. He pitched for the West Michigan Whitecaps in 2014 where he was 6–4 with a 3.11 ERA in 23 starts. In 2015, he played for the Erie SeaWolves where he compiled a 5–14 record with a 5.93 ERA in 27 starts.

=== New York Yankees ===
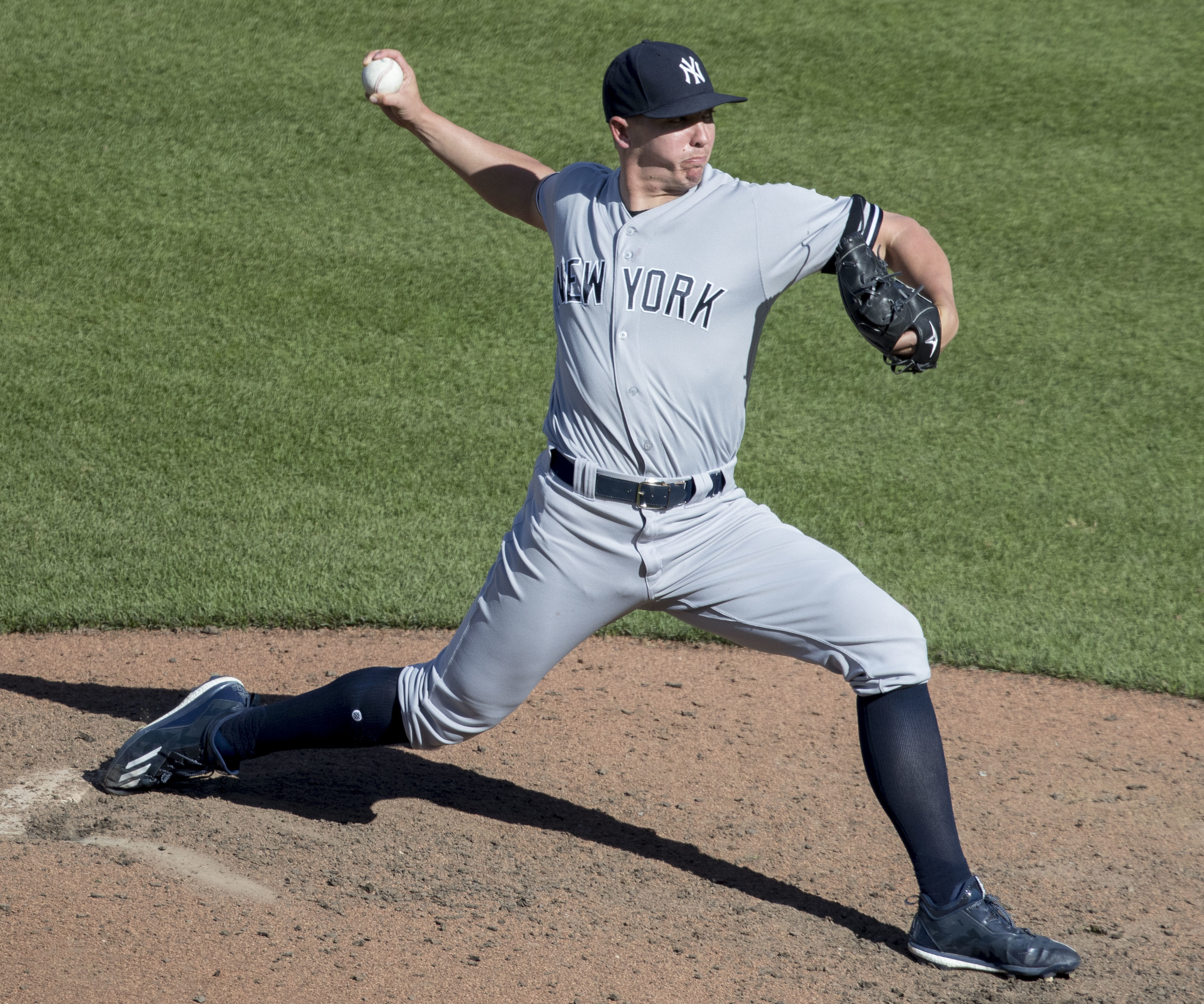
Green with the New York Yankees in 2017

On December 9, 2015, the Tigers traded Green and Luis Cessa to the New York Yankees in exchange for Justin Wilson. He received a non-roster spring training invitation on February 5, 2016. He began the year with the Scranton/Wilkes-Barre RailRiders. The Yankees promoted Green to the major leagues on May 14. He made his major league debut two days later. After being called up as a reliever, the Yankees shifted Green to the rotation. After four starts, the Yankees shut down Green for the season when he suffered a sprained elbow ligament. Green appeared in 12 games (eight starts), with a 2–4 record, 4.73 ERA and 52 strikeouts in 42 2/3 innings.

Green reported to spring training in 2017 as a starter. Instead of naming a fifth starter, the Yankees optioned him to the minors and carried an extra reliever instead. On May 8, Green was called up to the Yankees. Green made his season debut with the Yankees on May 9 and was used primarily as a reliever for the season. On June 11, Green made his first start of season, a spot start, against the Baltimore Orioles. He allowed two runs in two innings, striking out three. Green ended the season with a 5–0 record, 1.83 ERA and 103 strikeouts in 69 innings. He and Dellin Betances became the sixth pair of teammates to strike out 100 batters as a reliever. In the first inning of the 2017 American League Wild Card Game, Green relieved Luis Severino with two runners on base after three runners had scored. Green ended the inning with consecutive strikeouts and later pitched a scoreless second inning before being taken out in the third inning. In two innings pitched, Green allowed one earned run and struck out four. He finished the 2017 season with a 5–0 record, a 1.83 ERA, and a 0.74 WHIP in 40 games.

Green spent the entire 2018 season with the big league club. Following the acquisition of Zack Britton on July 24, Green was pushed down in the pecking order. He fell into mid-season skid where he posted a 6.75 ERA across 12 appearances. To get out of it, he reintroduced a changeup into his repertoire.

Green struggled in April 2019, allowing 14 earned runs in 7 2/3 innings pitched. The Yankees optioned Green to Scranton/Wilkes-Barre on April 24. He made his return on May 12, recording three strikeouts in the ninth inning to close out a 7–1 win against Tampa Bay Rays. For the 2019 season, Green was 4–4 with a 4.17 ERA. He appeared as the Yankees' "opener" 15 times. After throwing 4 2/3 scoreless innings in the playoffs, he allowed a three-run homer to Carlos Correa of the Houston Astros in Game 4 of the 2019 ALCS. He was the team's opener in Game 5, allowing a three-run home run to Yuli Gurriel in the first inning.

On August 28, 2020, Green allowed three home runs in one inning against the Mets. He recorded a 3.51 ERA, 32 strikeouts, and 11.2 K/9 in 25 2/3 innings pitched across 22 appearances that year. In 2021, Green posted a 3.12 ERA, 99 strikeouts, and 10.6 K/9 across 83 2/3 innings pitched. He had a 10–7 record, as well as a career high six saves, across his 67 appearances out of the bullpen.

Green started the 2022 season recording a 3.00 ERA, 16 strikeouts, and a 1–1 record with a save across 14 appearances. However, Green exited the Yankees' May 19 game against the Baltimore Orioles due to right forearm discomfort. Three days later, the team confirmed that Green would undergo Tommy John surgery, ending his season.

=== Toronto Blue Jays ===
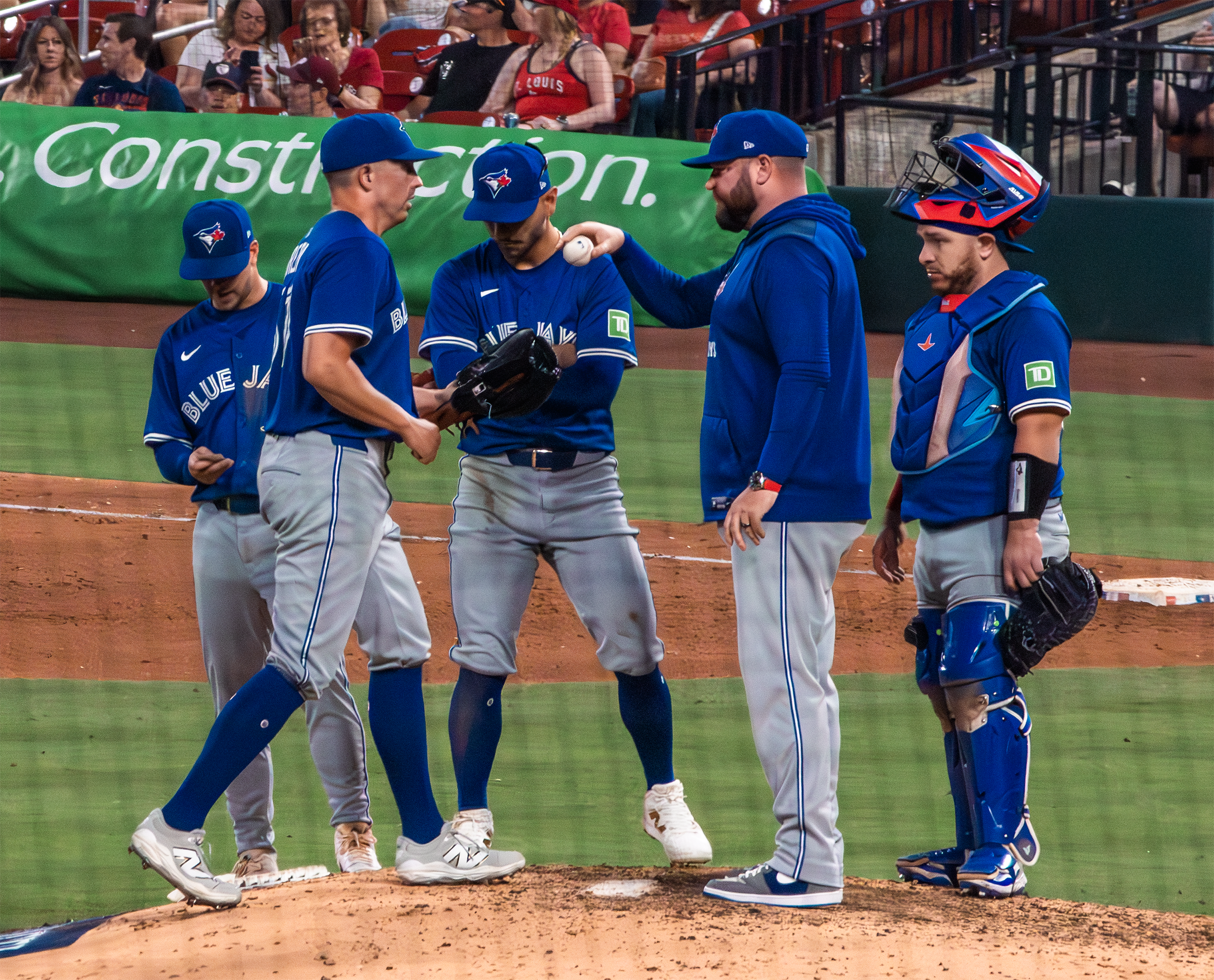
Green taking the ball in St. Louis, 2025.

On January 31, 2023, Green signed a two-year, $8.5 million contract with the Toronto Blue Jays. Since he was still recovering from Tommy John surgery at the time, this contract had an unconventional structure. After the first year of the contract, which guaranteed $2.25 million, the Blue Jays could exercise a team option that would pay him $27 million over three years, with the possibility of up to $1 million in performance bonuses based on games pitched. If the team would decline this option, then Green could trigger a player option for the 2024 season valued at $6.25 million with up to $2 million in bonuses. If he would decline that option, then the Blue Jays could exercise a final, two-year, $21-million team option with up to $1 million in bonuses. He was activated from the injured list on September 1, and made his Blue Jays debut that same day. Following the 2023 season, Toronto opted to exercise its two-year, $21 million option, after the first two options were declined.

Green made 53 relief appearances for Toronto during the 2024 season, compiling a 4–6 record and 3.21 ERA with 46 strikeouts and 17 saves across 53 1/3 innings pitched. He pitched in 45 games for the Blue Jays in 2025, registering a 3–2 record and 5.56 ERA with 35 strikeouts and one save across 43 2/3 innings pitched. Green was designated for assignment on July 29, 2025, after Toronto traded in exchange for Seranthony Dominguez. He cleared waivers and was released by the team on August 3. Green announced his retirement on October 27, 2026.

== Personal life ==
Green is married. During the offseason, Green and his wife reside in Louisville, Kentucky.
