= Justin Wilson (baseball) =

American baseball player (born 1987)

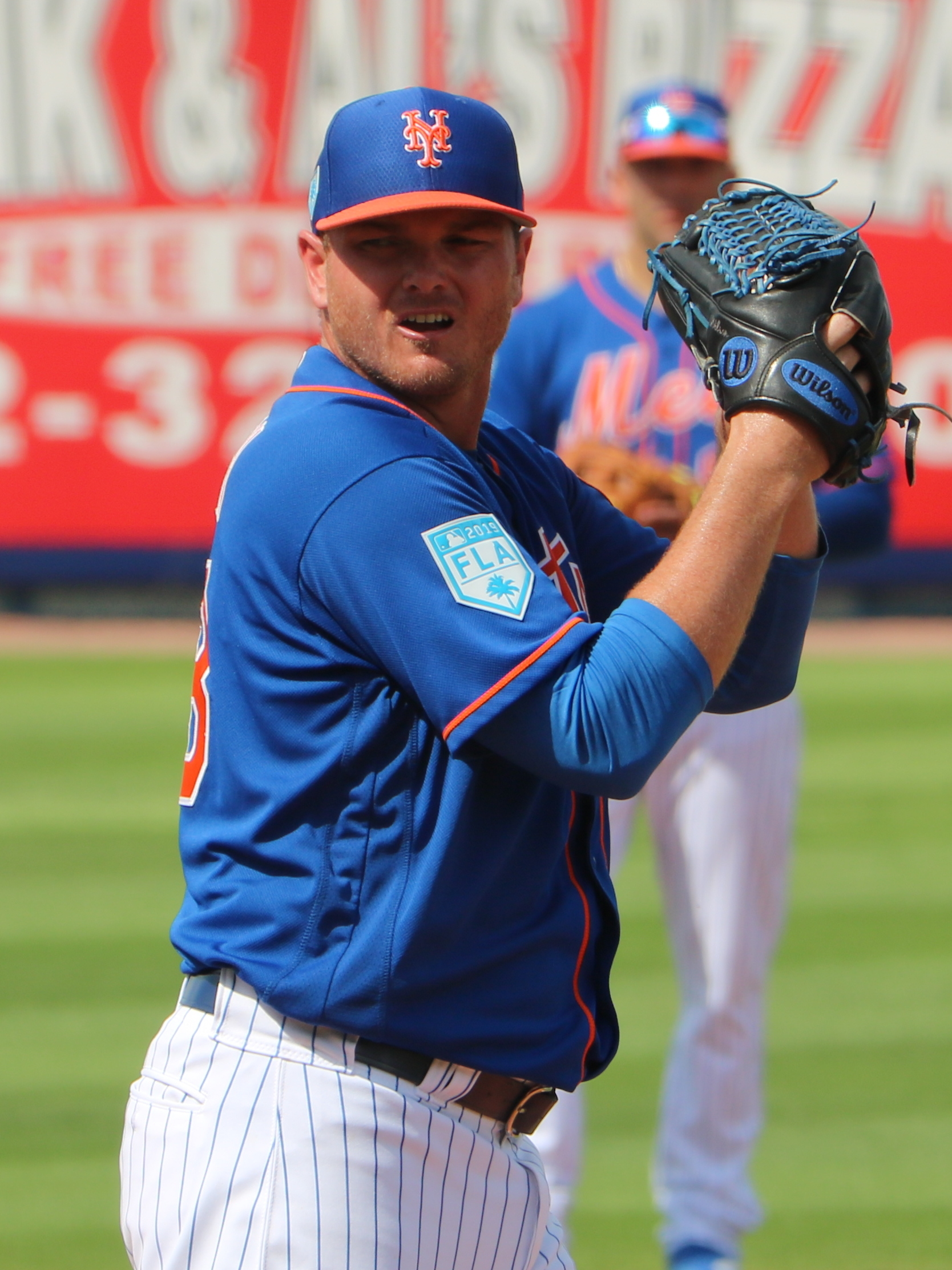
- Wilson with the New York Mets in 2019

Free agent
- Pitcher
- Born: August 18, 1987 (age 39); Anaheim, California, U.S.
- Bats: Left Throws: Left

MLB debut
- August 20, 2012, for the Pittsburgh Pirates

MLB statistics (through 2025 season)
- Win–loss record: 38–30
- Earned run average: 3.59
- Strikeouts: 618
- Stats at Baseball Reference

Teams
- Pittsburgh Pirates (2012–2014); New York Yankees (2015); Detroit Tigers (2016–2017); Chicago Cubs (2017–2018); New York Mets (2019–2020); New York Yankees (2021); Cincinnati Reds (2021–2022, 2024); Boston Red Sox (2025)

Justin James Wilson (born August 18, 1987) is an American professional baseball pitcher who is a free agent. He has previously played in Major League Baseball (MLB) for the Pittsburgh Pirates, New York Yankees, Detroit Tigers, Chicago Cubs, New York Mets, Cincinnati Reds, and Boston Red Sox. Prior to his professional career, Wilson played college baseball for the Fresno State Bulldogs, where he was a member of the 2008 College World Series champions.

== High school and college career ==
Wilson attended Buchanan High School in Clovis, California. Out of high school, the Los Angeles Dodgers drafted Wilson in the 37th round (1126th overall) of the 2005 Major League Baseball draft, but he did not sign, opting to enroll at Fresno State University, where he played college baseball for the Fresno State Bulldogs baseball team. In his junior season, Wilson was named to the College World Series All-Tournament Team, as Fresno State won the 2008 College World Series.

== Professional career ==
=== Pittsburgh Pirates ===
After his junior season at Fresno State, the Pirates drafted Wilson in the fifth round (144th overall) of the 2008 Major League Baseball draft, and he signed with the Pirates.

In 2009, he played for the Lynchburg Hillcats. In 2010, he played for the Altoona Curve. In 2011, he played for the Indianapolis Indians. The Pirates added him to their 40-man roster after the 2011 season to protect him from the Rule 5 draft.

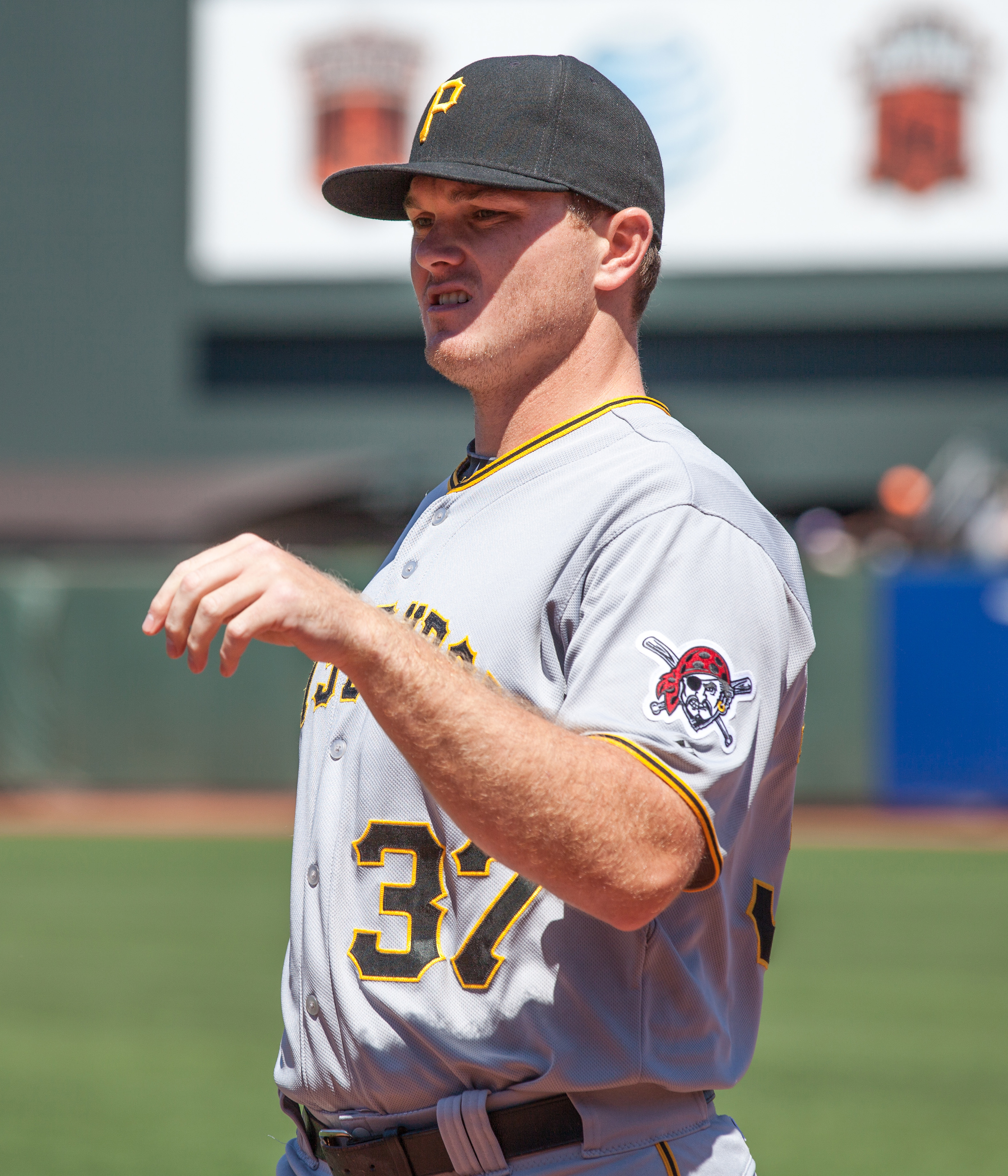
Wilson with the Pittsburgh Pirates in 2014

On April 29, 2012, pitching for the AAA Indianapolis Indians against the Durham Bulls, Wilson pitched the first 7 1/3 innings of a combined no-hitter, finished off by Jumbo Diaz and Doug Slaten. “It was pretty awesome,” Wilson said after the game. “Great for Jumbo to come in and not give up a hit. And Doug as well. Great defense all around. Outstanding play to end the game, it was an awesome play. And then José Morales behind the plate was just outstanding tonight.” On leaving the game with a no-hitter, Wilson said: “It was tough, but you’ve got to trust your manager. He was making the call on what he thought, which was totally okay with me. Totally understandable. I respect him, and understand what he was doing.” With two outs in the ninth inning, Reid Brignac sent a slow rolling check swing to second base, then Anderson Hernández ranged in, bare handed the ball, and made the flip to first base to complete the no-hitter. On August 9, 2012, while still pitching for the Indianapolis Indians, Wilson pitched his second no-hitter of the 2012 season, an eight inning, complete game no-hitter against the Charlotte Knights (rain ended the game in the eighth inning). Wilson was promoted to the Pittsburgh Pirates on August 20, 2012. Wilson made his major league debut the same day, pitching one scoreless inning, with three strikeouts.

Wilson had a 6–1 win–loss record with a 2.08 earned run average (ERA) for the Pirates in 2013. He had a 3–4 record with a 4.20 ERA in 2014.

=== New York Yankees ===
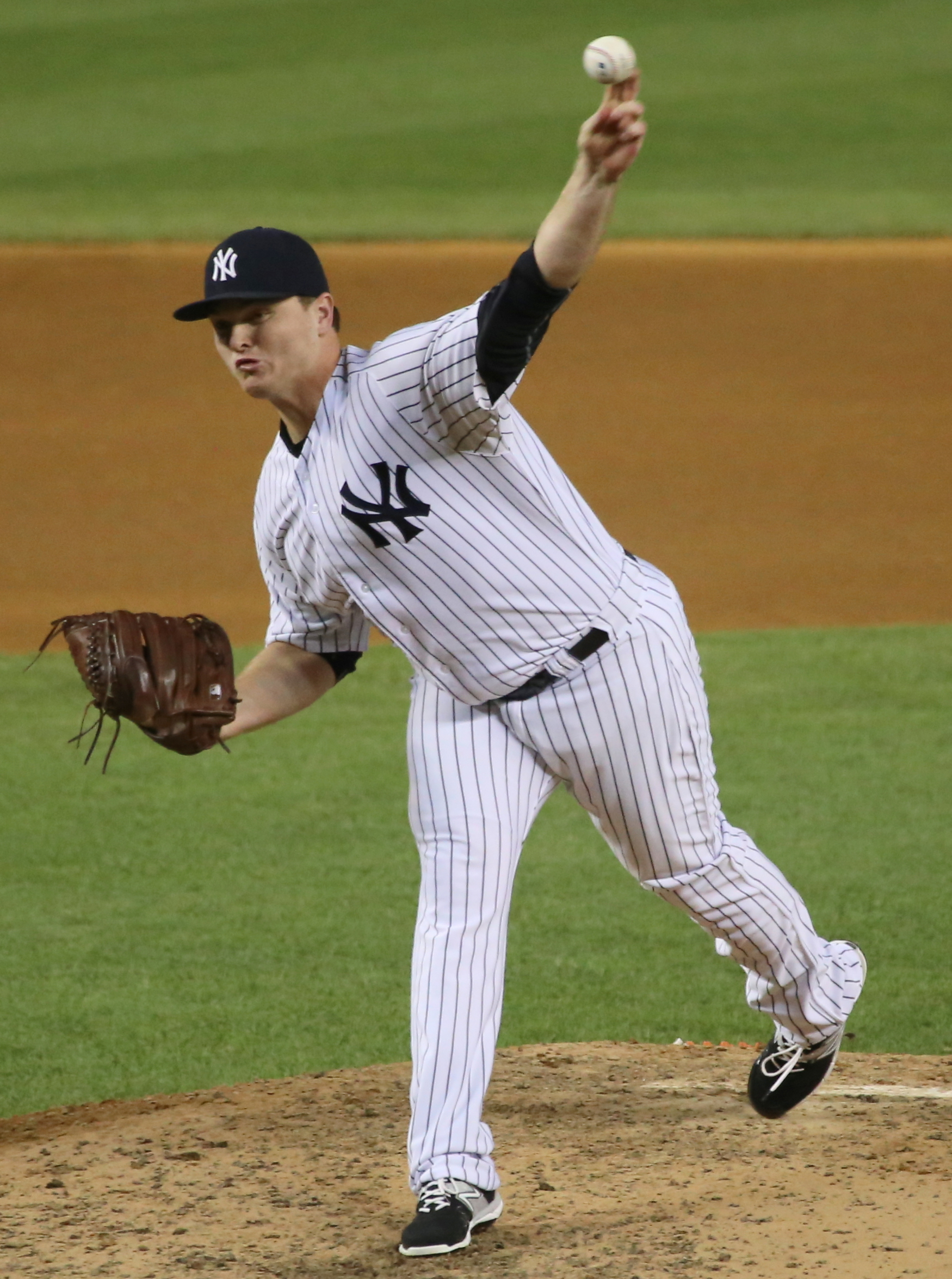
Wilson with the New York Yankees in 2015

On November 12, 2014, the Pirates traded Wilson to the New York Yankees in exchange for Francisco Cervelli. During the 2015 season, Yankees' manager Joe Girardi used Wilson as his setup pitcher for the seventh inning, with Dellin Betances and Andrew Miller pitching the eighth and ninth innings, respectively. Wilson had a 3.10 ERA in 61 innings pitched in 2015.

=== Detroit Tigers ===
On December 9, 2015, the Yankees traded Wilson to the Detroit Tigers in exchange for Chad Green and Luis Cessa. On January 13, 2016, the Tigers avoided arbitration with Wilson, agreeing on a one-year, $1.525 million contract. During the 2016 season, Wilson posted a 4–5 record, and a 4.14 ERA with 65 strikeouts in 58 2/3 innings pitched. His strikeout rate of 10.0 per 9 innings was the highest of his career.

On January 13, 2017, the Tigers avoided arbitration with Wilson, agreeing on a one-year, $2.7 million contract.

Wilson began the 2017 season allowing no hits and no runs in his first 11 appearances (covering 9 2/3 innings). The streak ended on April 29, when Melky Cabrera of the Chicago White Sox led off the 10th inning with a home run off Wilson. On May 9, 2017, manager Brad Ausmus stated that Wilson would be the team's closer, after incumbent closer Francisco Rodríguez had blown his fourth save of the young season.

=== Chicago Cubs ===
On July 31, 2017, Wilson and catcher Alex Avila were traded to the Chicago Cubs in exchange for infielder Jeimer Candelario, shortstop Isaac Paredes, and a player to be named later or cash considerations. Wilson struggled with the Cubs, pitching to a 5.09 ERA and 2.09 WHIP in 23 games, while walking 19 batters in 17 2/3 innings. His full 2017 season totals included a 4–4 record, 13 saves (all with Detroit), 3.41 ERA, 1.29 WHIP, and 80 strikeouts in 58 innings.

On January 12, 2018, Wilson signed a one-year, $4.25 million contract to remain with the Cubs, avoiding arbitration. He made 71 appearances in 2018, but logged only 54 2/3 innings, as he was mainly used against left-handed batters. He went 4–5 with a 3.46 ERA and 69 strikeouts. He became a free agent after the season.

=== New York Mets ===
On January 28, 2019, Wilson signed a two-year, $10 million contract with the New York Mets. Wilson made 45 appearances for the Mets in 2019, pitching to a 2.54 ERA with 44 strikeouts in 39.0 innings pitched. In the 60-game shortened 2020 season, Wilson appeared in 23 games for the club, pitching to a 3.66 ERA with 23 strikeouts in 19.2 innings pitched.

=== New York Yankees (second stint) ===
On February 23, 2021, Wilson signed a one-year contract with the New York Yankees. In 21 appearances for the Yankees, Wilson had a 1–1 record with a 7.50 ERA and 15 strikeouts.

=== Cincinnati Reds ===
On July 28, 2021, Wilson was traded to the Cincinnati Reds along with Luis Cessa in exchange for Jason Parker. On April 27, 2022, Wilson was placed on the 10-day IL retroactive to April 24 with elbow soreness, having pitched only 3 2/3 innings on the young season. On May 27, he was transferred to the 60-day IL and underwent Tommy John surgery on June 3 with a 14 to 16 month recovery time expected. He missed the entire 2022 season.

=== Milwaukee Brewers ===
On February 18, 2023, Wilson signed a one-year contract with the Milwaukee Brewers that included a club option for the 2024 season. After beginning the year on the injured list while he continued to recover from Tommy John, Wilson was activated to make his Brewers debut on July 28. He sustained an injury to his lat while warming up in the bullpen, and was placed back on the injured list the following day. On August 5, manager Craig Counsell announced that Wilson would miss the remainder of the season as a result of the lat injury. He became a free agent following the season.

=== Cincinnati Reds (second stint) ===
On February 16, 2024, Wilson signed a minor league contract with the Los Angeles Dodgers. On March 12, he opted out of his contract and returned to free agency. Three days later, Wilson signed a $1.5 million plus incentives major league contract to return to the Reds. After pitching to a 5.59 ERA over 46 2/3 innings, he was not re-signed.

=== Boston Red Sox ===
On November 14, 2024, Wilson signed a one-year contract with the Boston Red Sox. He went 4–1 with the major league team in 2025, pitching to a 3.35 ERA with 57 strikeouts over 48 1/3 innings.

== Pitching style ==
Wilson throws hard four-seam and two-seam fastballs that average 95–96 MPH (topping out at 99 MPH). He also throws a cut fastball in the 90–94 MPH range. His primary offspeed pitch is a curveball that averages 83–87 MPH.
