= Diego Castillo (infielder) =

Venezuelan baseball player (born 1997)

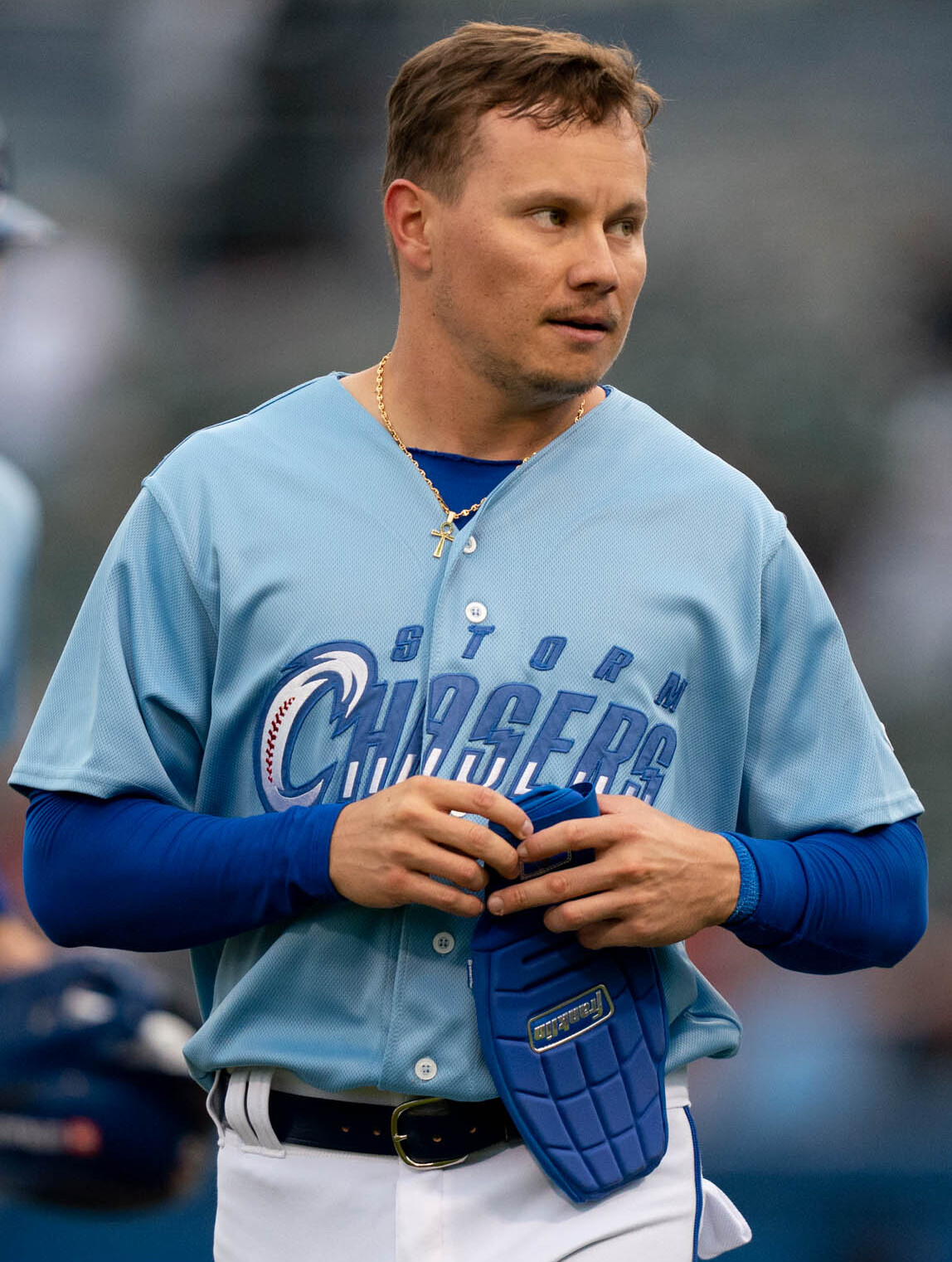
- Castillo with the Omaha Storm Chasers in 2025

Free agent
- Shortstop / Second baseman
- Born: October 28, 1997 (age 29); Barquisimeto, Venezuela
- Bats: Right Throws: Right

MLB debut
- April 7, 2022, for the Pittsburgh Pirates

MLB statistics (through 2024 season)
- Batting average: .208
- Home runs: 11
- Runs batted in: 31
- Stats at Baseball Reference

Teams
- Pittsburgh Pirates (2022); Arizona Diamondbacks (2023); Minnesota Twins (2024)

Diego Alejandro Castillo (born October 28, 1997) is a Venezuelan professional baseball infielder who is a free agent. He has previously played for the Pittsburgh Pirates, Arizona Diamondbacks, and Minnesota Twins.

== Career ==
=== New York Yankees ===
The New York Yankees signed Castillo as an international free agent on December 18, 2014. He received a $750,000 signing bonus. He debuted professionally in the Dominican Summer League in 2015, then in the United States in the Gulf Coast League in 2016.

Castillo made 118 appearances for the Single-A Charleston RiverDogs in 2017, slashing .263/.310/.315 with one home run, 42 RBI, and nine stolen bases. In 2018, he played in 120 games for the High-A Tampa Tarpons, hitting .260/.307/.324 with two home runs, 51 RBI, and 11 stolen bases. Castillo made 114 appearances for Tampa during the 2019 campaign, batting .248/.310/.329 with four home runs, 33 RBI, and 13 stolen bases.

Castillo did not play in a game in 2020 due to the cancellation of the minor league season because of the COVID-19 pandemic. He began the 2021 season with the Double-A Somerset Patriots, slashing .277/.345/.504 with 11 home runs, 32 RBI, and eight stolen bases across 58 contests.

=== Pittsburgh Pirates ===
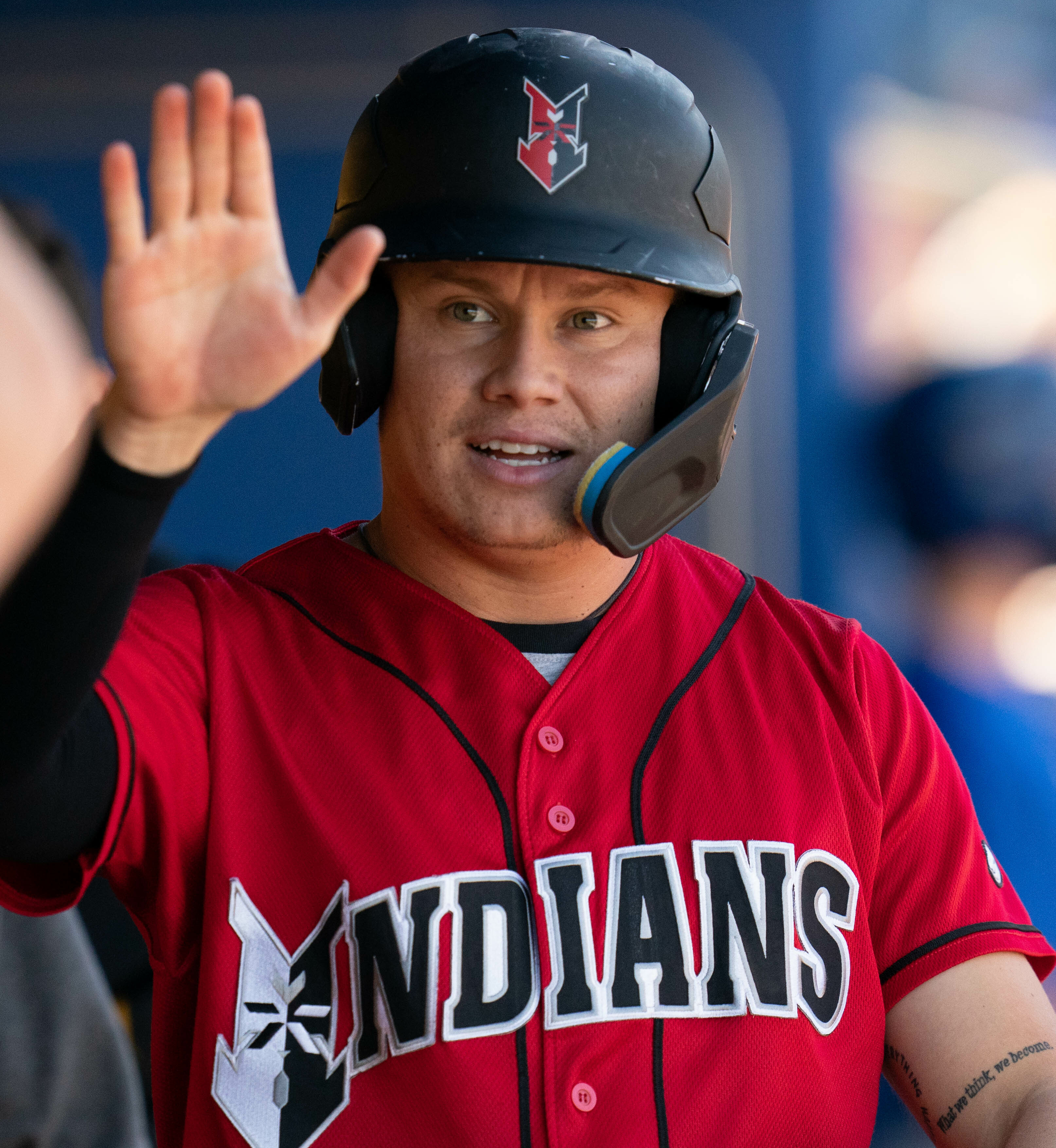
Castillo with the Indianapolis Indians in 2022

On July 26, 2021, the Yankees traded Castillo and Hoy Park to the Pittsburgh Pirates for pitcher Clay Holmes. Castillo slashed .278/.355/.487 with 19 home runs, 55 runs batted in (RBI), and nine stolen bases in 105 games split between the Double-A Altoona Curve, Triple-A Indianapolis Indians and Somerset. On November 7, the Pirates added Castillo to their 40-man roster to prevent him from reaching minor league free agency.

On April 4, 2022, it was announced that Castillo had made the Pirates’ Opening Day roster. On April 9, Castillo collected his first career hit, a pinch-hit double off of St. Louis Cardinals reliever T. J. McFarland. He played in 96 games in his rookie campaign, hitting .206/.251/.382 with 11 home runs and 29 RBI. He was designated for assignment on December 20, 2022.

=== Arizona Diamondbacks ===
On December 23, 2022, Castillo was traded to the Arizona Diamondbacks for pitcher Scott Randall. Castillo was optioned to the Triple-A Reno Aces to begin the 2023 season. He appeared in one game for Arizona. He spent almost the entire season in Reno, hitting .313/.431/.410 with 3 home runs, 72 RBI, and 13 stolen bases across 124 games. The Diamondbacks designated Castillo for assignment on December 22.

=== Baltimore Orioles ===
On January 5, 2024, the New York Mets claimed Castillo off waivers. One week later, the Mets designated him for assignment after signing of Sean Manaea. On January 19, Castillo was again claimed off waivers, this time by the New York Yankees, who then designated him for assignment on January 29. The Philadelphia Phillies then claimed him on February 5 but designated him for assignment on February 14. On February 16, Castillo was again claimed off waivers, this time by the Baltimore Orioles, who designated him for assignment two days later. He cleared waivers after being placed on waivers five times in the offseason and was sent outright to the Triple-A Norfolk Tides on February 20. In three games for Norfolk, Castillo went 4-for-13 (.308) with no home runs, no RBI, and three walks.

=== Minnesota Twins ===
On April 5, 2024, the Orioles traded Castillo to the Minnesota Twins for cash. In 71 games for the Triple-A St. Paul Saints, he batted .272/.379/.404 with five home runs, 30 RBI, and seven stolen bases. On July 14, the Twins selected Castillo's contract, adding him to their major league roster. In four games for Minnesota, he went 2-for-6 with two RBI. Castillo was designated for assignment by the Twins on July 24. He cleared waivers and was sent outright to St. Paul on July 26. Castillo elected free agency on October 1.

=== New York Mets ===
On March 13, 2025, Castillo signed a minor league contract with the New York Mets. In 13 appearances for the Triple-A Syracuse Mets, Castillo batted .167/.217/.262 with one home run and five RBI.

=== Kansas City Royals ===
On May 22, 2025, Castillo was traded to the Kansas City Royals organization. In his first season outside the majors since 2021, he batted a combined .262/.342/.395 in Triple-A with Syracuse and the Triple-A Omaha Storm Chasers. Castillo elected free agency following the season on November 6.

=== Algodoneros de Unión Laguna ===
On January 30, 2026, Castillo signed with the Algodoneros de Unión Laguna of the Mexican League. In nine appearances for the Algodoneros, Castillo slashed .528/.575/.806 with two home runs and 14 RBI.

=== Texas Rangers ===
On April 27, 2026, Castillo signed a minor league contract with the Texas Rangers. In 95 games with Triple-A Round Rock Express he batted .304/.374/.422 with 5 home runs, 57 RBIs and 7 stolen bases. He elected free agency on November 2.
