= Stephen Ridings =

American baseball player (born 1995)

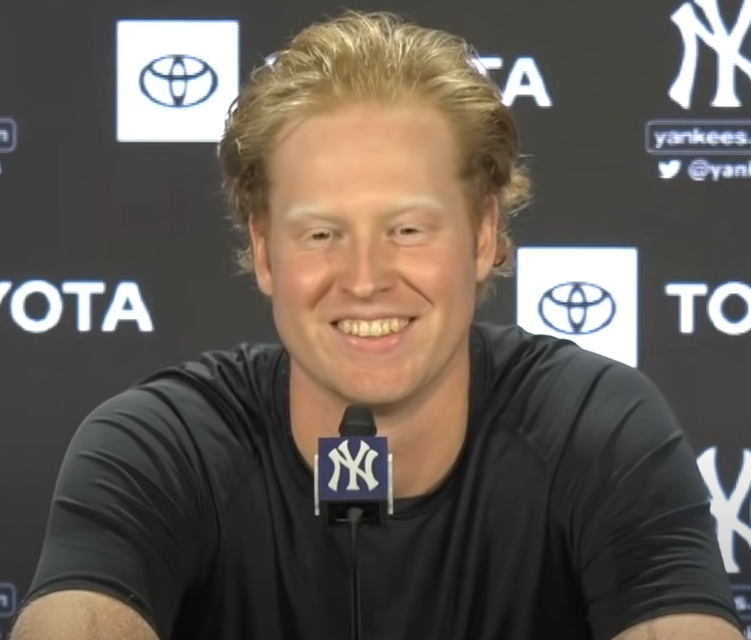
- Ridings with the New York Yankees
- Pitcher
- Born: August 14, 1995 (age 30); Commack, New York, U.S.
- Batted: Right Threw: Right

MLB debut
- August 3, 2021, for the New York Yankees

Last MLB appearance
- August 15, 2021, for the New York Yankees

MLB statistics
- Win–loss record: 0–0
- Earned run average: 1.80
- Strikeouts: 7
- Stats at Baseball Reference

Teams
- New York Yankees (2021)

Stephen Thomas Ridings (born August 14, 1995) is an American former professional baseball pitcher. He played in Major League Baseball (MLB) for the New York Yankees in 2021.

== Playing career ==
=== Amateur career ===
Ridings attended St. Anthony's High School in South Huntington, New York, and played college baseball at Haverford College.

=== Chicago Cubs ===
Ridings was drafted by the Chicago Cubs in the eighth round of the 2016 Major League Baseball draft. Ridings made his professional debut in 2017 with the rookie-level Arizona League Cubs, logging a 4.09 ERA in 12 appearances. In 2018, Ridings played for the Low-A Eugene Emeralds, pitching to a 4.15 ERA with 44 strikeouts in 34.2 innings across 22 games.

=== Kansas City Royals ===
On March 9, 2019, the Cubs traded Ridings to the Kansas City Royals for Donnie Dewees. Ridings spent the 2019 season with the rookie-level Idaho Falls Chukars, but struggled to a 4-3 record and 5.91 ERA with 88 strikeouts in 13 games (11 of them starts). Ridings did not play in a game in 2020 due to the cancellation of the minor league season because of the COVID-19 pandemic. On November 4, 2020, Ridings was released by the Royals organization.

=== New York Yankees ===
On January 18, 2021, Ridings signed a minor league contract with the New York Yankees. Ridings began the year with the Double-A Somerset Patriots, posting a 0.47 ERA in 14 appearances with the team before being promoted to Triple-A. On July 21, while pitching for the Scranton/Wilkes-Barre RailRiders, he combined with Luis Gil and Reggie McClain to throw a no-hitter.

Ridings made his major league debut on August 3, 2021, in which he struck out three batters and allowed one hit. Luis Gil started the game and Brody Koerner also pitched. It was only the second time that three pitchers debuted in the same game for the Yankees, previously occurring on September 26, 1950. Ridings pitched to a 1.80 ERA in five appearances with the big league club before being returned to Triple-A Scranton on August 17. The Yankees added Ridings to their 40-man roster after the 2021 season on November 19, 2021.

Ridings began the 2022 season with a right shoulder impingement. He began throwing bullpen sessions in August, but never appeared in a game having spent the entire season on the injured list.

=== New York Mets ===
On November 15, 2022, the New York Mets claimed Ridings from the Yankees off of waivers. On May 1, 2023, Ridings was placed on the 60-day injured list with a right lat strain that he had suffered in Spring Training. On June 15, he was activated from the injured list and optioned to the Triple–A Syracuse Mets. After posting a 6.75 ERA in 10 minor league games, on July 19, Ridings was removed from the 40-man roster and sent outright to Syracuse. He was released by the Mets organization on July 30.

=== High Point Rockers ===
On July 7, 2024, Ridings signed with the High Point Rockers of the Atlantic League of Professional Baseball. In 9 games (7 starts) for the Rockers, he posted a 1–0 record and 3.06 ERA with 41 strikeouts across 32 1/3 innings pitched. He became a free agent following the season.

=== Los Angeles Dodgers ===
On January 25, 2025, Ridings signed a minor league contract with the Los Angeles Dodgers. He appeared in one game for the Triple-A Oklahoma City Comets, allowing five runs on three hits and three walks, without recording an out. On May 6, he was placed on the voluntarily retired list.

== Coaching career ==
On January 15, 2026, Ridings was hired to serve as a pitching coach for the Wichita Wind Surge, the Double-A affiliate of the Minnesota Twins.

== Personal life ==
After the 2020 minor league season was canceled, Ridings worked out on his own, paying the bills by selling sports equipment and teaching chemistry as a substitute teacher at the Palm Beach Maritime Academy in Lantana, Florida.
