= Tim Locastro =

American baseball player (born 1992)

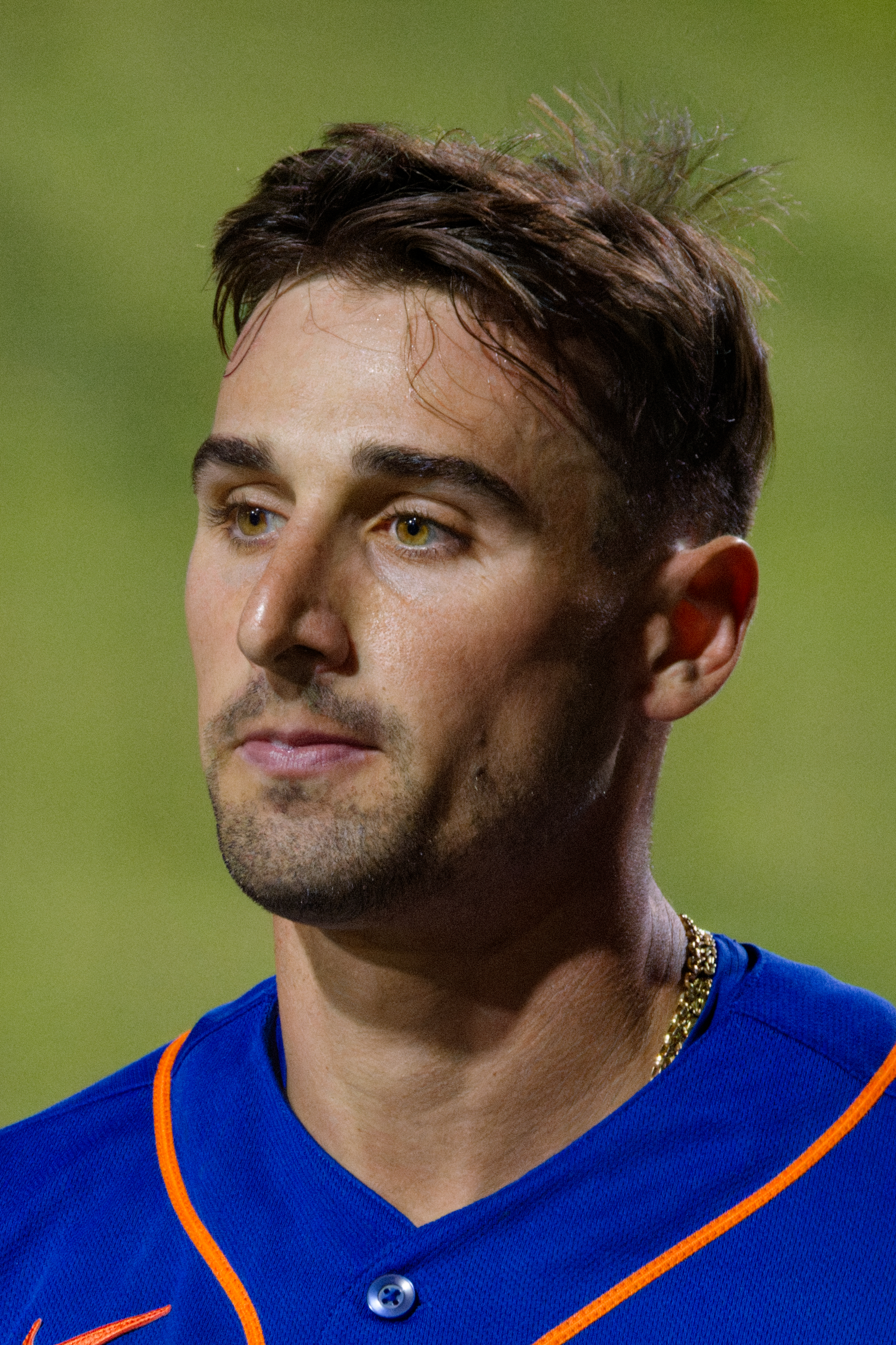
- Locastro with the Mets in 2023
- Outfielder
- Born: July 14, 1992 (age 33); Auburn, New York, U.S.
- Batted: Right Threw: Right

MLB debut
- September 29, 2017, for the Los Angeles Dodgers

Last MLB appearance
- October 1, 2023, for the New York Mets

MLB statistics
- Batting average: .227
- Home runs: 9
- Runs batted in: 38
- Stolen bases: 45
- Stats at Baseball Reference

Teams
- Los Angeles Dodgers (2017–2018); Arizona Diamondbacks (2019–2021); New York Yankees (2021–2022); New York Mets (2023)

Career highlights and awards
- MLB records: Most stolen bases to begin career without being caught (29-for-29)

Timothy Donald Locastro (born July 14, 1992) is an American former professional baseball outfielder. He played in Major League Baseball (MLB) for the Los Angeles Dodgers, Arizona Diamondbacks, New York Yankees, and New York Mets from 2017 to 2023. He holds the MLB record for most consecutive successful stolen bases to start a career, with 29.

== Early life ==
Locastro was born in Auburn, New York, on July 14, 1992. He is of Italian and Irish descent and was raised in a churchgoing Roman Catholic home. His family were fans of the New York Yankees and of the Notre Dame Fighting Irish football team.

== Playing career ==
=== Amateur career ===
Locastro played high school baseball at Auburn High School in Auburn, New York, and then played college baseball at Ithaca College, where he was the Empire 8 player of the year in 2013 when he set school records for runs and stolen bases.

=== Toronto Blue Jays ===
Locastro was drafted by the Toronto Blue Jays in the 13th round of the 2013 MLB draft and signed with them on June 13.

Locastro played for the Bluefield Blue Jays of the Appalachian League in 2013, hitting .283 in 43 games. The following season, he was selected to play in the Northwest League mid-season all-star game, and he hit .313 in 67 games for the Vancouver Canadians and also stole 32 bases while being caught only four times. He began the 2015 season with the Lansing Lugnuts of the Midwest League, where he hit .310 with 30 steals in 70 games.

=== Los Angeles Dodgers ===
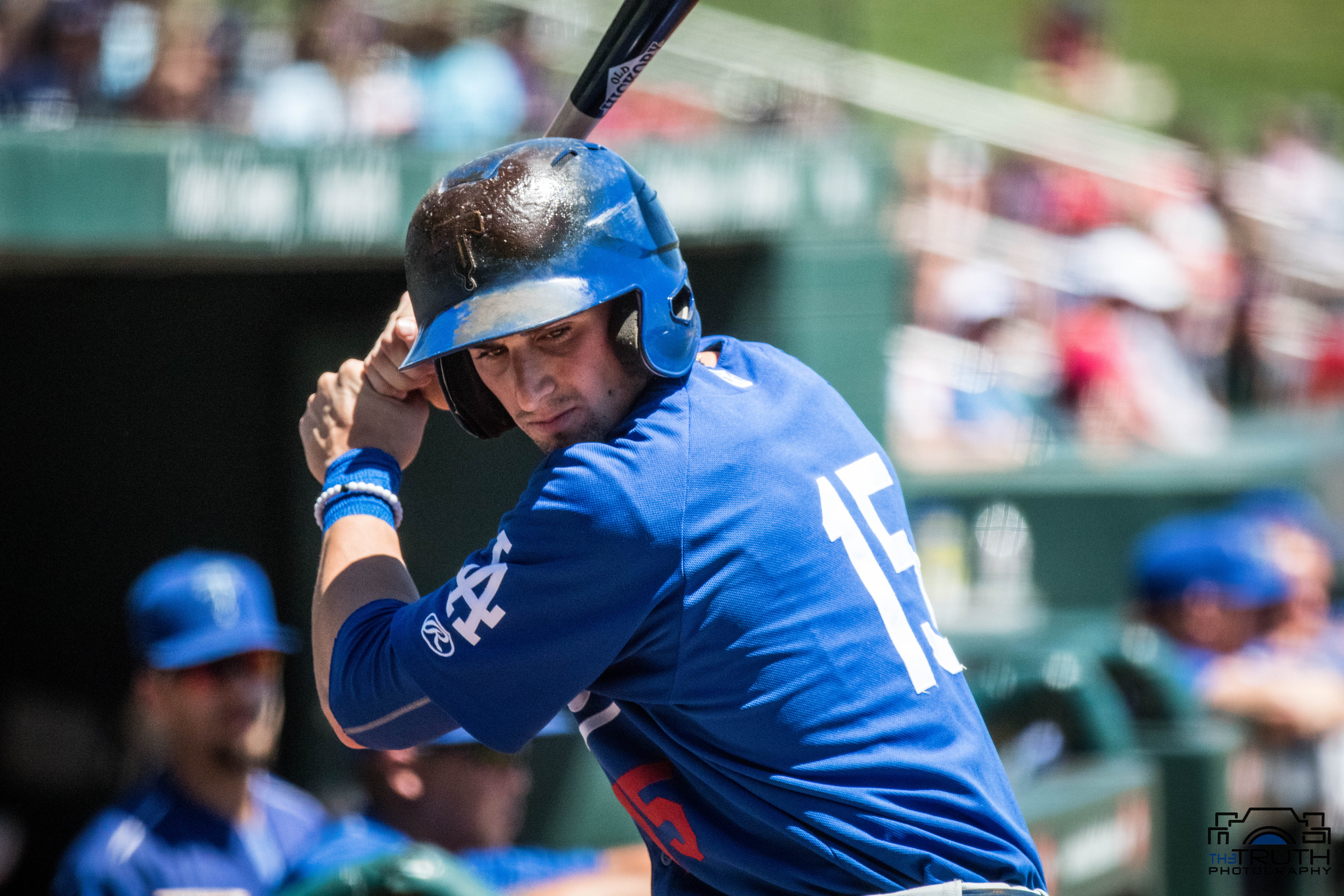
Locastro with the Tulsa Drillers

Locastro was traded to the Los Angeles Dodgers (along with Chase De Jong) on July 2, 2015, in exchange for three international signing slots. He was assigned to the Rancho Cucamonga Quakes and helped them to the California League championship. He began 2016 with Rancho Cucamonga again and was promoted mid-season to the Double-A Tulsa Drillers. Between the two teams, he was in 131 games, hitting .285 with 24 steals. The Dodgers assigned him to the Glendale Desert Dogs of the Arizona Fall League after the season. In 2017 he was selected to the Texas League mid-season all-star game and between Tulsa and the Triple-A Oklahoma City Dodgers, he hit .308 in 127 games with 34 stolen bases.

Locastro was called up to the majors for the first time on September 29, 2017. He was called up to be evaluated for possible use as an impact pinch runner in the playoffs. He made his MLB debut that night against the Colorado Rockies, running for Corey Seager in the eighth inning and remaining in the game to play an inning in left field. He became the first Ithaca player to play in MLB since Glen Cook appeared in nine games for the Texas Rangers in 1985. The following day, Locastro again appeared as a pinch runner, and stole third base for his first major league steal. He did finally get an at-bat, in his third and final appearance for the Dodgers this season, on October 1. He pinch hit against Adam Ottavino and popped out to second. He was not added to the post-season roster. Locastro was designated for assignment on November 20, 2018.

=== Arizona Diamondbacks ===
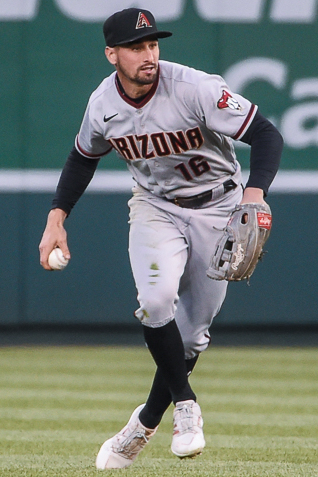
Locastro with the Diamondbacks in 2021

The day after being designated, Locastro was traded to the New York Yankees for minor league pitcher Drew Finley and cash. On January 16, 2019, the Yankees traded Locastro to the Arizona Diamondbacks for minor league pitcher Ronald Roman and cash.

In 2019, Locastro batted .250/.357/.340, and stole 17 bases without being caught (bringing his career major league record to 22 stolen bases without being caught), leading the major leagues in stolen base percentage. He had the fastest sprint speed of all major league players, at 30.8 feet/second. He finished the season with a BABIP of .243 on ground balls. He also set the MLB record for most hit by pitches (22, or 8.8%) with fewer than 300 plate appearances, which in turn inflated his on base percentage (.357).

In 2020 he batted .290/.395/.464 in 69 at bats with 15 runs, two home runs, seven RBIs, and four stolen bases in four attempts, and was hit by pitches four times. He had yet to record a caught stealing in his career. He had the fastest sprint speed of all major league players, at 30.7 feet/second.

On April 10, 2021, he broke the record for number of stolen bases to start a career without being caught stealing (28), a record previously held by Tim Raines. On April 17, Locastro got caught stealing for the first time in his career, being thrown out by Yan Gomes of the Washington Nationals. In the play, he also jammed his finger and was placed on the 10-day injured list after the game and was reinstated May 3. In 55 games with Arizona in 2021, Locastro slashed .178/.271/.220 with one home run and five RBIs.

=== New York Yankees ===
On July 1, 2021, the Diamondbacks traded Locastro to the New York Yankees in exchange for Keegan Curtis. On July 11, Locastro hit his first Yankees home run against Framber Valdez of the Houston Astros. Locastro played in nine games (batting 4-for-21) for the Yankees before suffering a torn anterior cruciate ligament while catching a fly ball off the bat of Boston Red Sox outfielder Alex Verdugo on July 17, ending his 2021 season. In 2021, Locastro had the fastest sprint speed of all major league center fielders, and the second-fastest sprint speed in the major leagues, at 30.7 feet per second (9.4 m/s).

On November 5, 2021, Locastro was claimed off waivers by the Boston Red Sox. However, he was non-tendered on November 30, making him a free agent. On March 13, 2022, Locastro was signed by the Yankees to a one-year major league deal. He began the 2022 season with the Scranton/Wilkes-Barre RailRiders and was promoted to the major leagues on April 17. Playing in 38 games for the Yankees, Locastro batted .186/.239/.349 with 2 home runs, 4 RBI, and 8 stolen bases. On November 10, Locastro was removed from the 40-man roster and sent outright to Triple–A; he subsequently elected free agency.

=== New York Mets ===
On January 9, 2023, Locastro signed a minor league contract with the New York Mets organization with a spring training invitation. On March 27, the Mets designated Darin Ruf for assignment, clearing the way for Locastro to make the major league Opening Day roster. He played in 11 games for the Mets, going hitless in 7 at-bats while appearing mainly as a pinch runner before he was placed on the injured list with back spasms on April 17. He began a rehab assignment with the Single-A St. Lucie Mets on April 30. He suffered a thumb injury late in his rehab assignment and was placed on the 60-day injured list on May 19. It was later revealed that he would undergo surgery to repair a torn UCL in his right thumb. On August 12, he was activated and slotted in the lineup as the starting center fielder in that day's game against the Atlanta Braves. In 43 games for the Mets, he batted .232/.338/.393 with 2 home runs, 3 RBI, and 6 stolen bases. Following the season on November 2, Locastro was removed from the 40–man roster and sent outright to the Triple–A Syracuse Mets. He elected free agency on November 6.

=== San Diego Padres ===
On February 28, 2024, Locastro signed a minor league contract with the San Diego Padres. In 33 games for the Triple-A El Paso Chihuahuas, he slashed .333/.449/.479 with two home runs, 11 RBI, and eight stolen bases. On July 24, Locastro was ruled out for the remainder of the season after undergoing surgery to repair the labrum in his shoulder. He elected free agency following the season on November 4.

On February 20, 2025, Locastro re-signed with the Padres on a new minor league contract. He made 104 appearances for El Paso, batting .270/.367/.433 with nine home runs, 52 RBI, and 32 stolen bases. Locastro elected free agency following the season on November 6.

== Coaching career ==
On January 21, 2026, Locastro was announced as a baserunning and outfield coordinator within the player development department of the San Diego Padres.
