= Luis Gil (baseball) =

Dominican baseball player (born 1998)

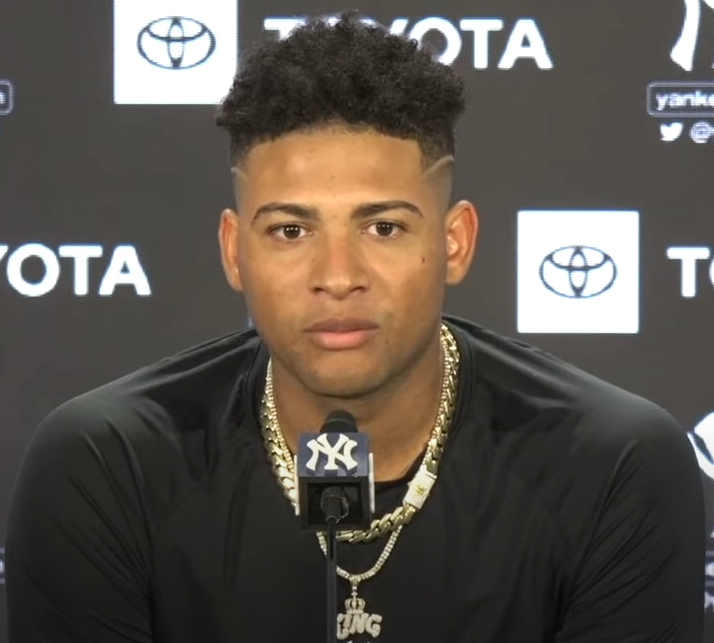
- Gil in 2021

Free agent
- Pitcher
- Born: June 3, 1998 (age 28); Azua, Dominican Republic
- Bats: Right Throws: Right

MLB debut
- August 3, 2021, for the New York Yankees

MLB statistics (through 2026 season)
- Win–loss record: 21–11
- Earned run average: 3.61
- Strikeouts: 272
- Stats at Baseball Reference

Teams
- New York Yankees (2021–2022, 2024–2026)

Career highlights and awards
- AL Rookie of the Year (2024)

Luis Ángel Gil (Spanish pronunciation: [xil]; born June 3, 1998) is a Dominican professional baseball pitcher who is a free agent. Gil signed with the Minnesota Twins as an international free agent in 2015, and he made his Major League Baseball (MLB) debut in 2021 with the New York Yankees. He won the American League Rookie of the Year Award in 2024.

== Career ==
=== Minnesota Twins ===
Gil signed with the Minnesota Twins as an international free agent on February 12, 2015, for a $90,000 signing bonus. He made his professional debut that season with the Dominican Summer League Twins, going 1–2 with a 4.63 ERA over 23 1/3 innings. After not pitching in 2016, he spent 2017 with the Dominican Summer League Twins, pitching to a 0–2 record with a 2.59 earned run average over 14 starts.

=== New York Yankees ===
==== Minor leagues ====
On March 16, 2018, the Twins traded Gil to the New York Yankees in exchange for Jake Cave. He spent the season with the rookie–level Pulaski Yankees and Low–A Staten Island Yankees, compiling a combined 2–3 record and 1.96 ERA over 12 starts, striking out 68 over 46 innings. He started 2019 with the Single–A Charleston RiverDogs, and was promoted to the High–A Tampa Tarpons in July. Over twenty starts between the two teams, Gil went 5–5 with a 2.72 ERA, compiling 123 strikeouts over 96 innings.

Gil began the 2021 season with the Double–A Somerset Patriots and was promoted to the Triple–A Scranton/Wilkes-Barre RailRiders in June. On July 21, Gil combined with Reggie McClain and Stephen Ridings to throw a no-hitter for the RailRiders.

==== Major leagues ====
The Yankees promoted him to the major leagues for the first time on August 3, 2021, making his major league debut with a start against the Baltimore Orioles. He pitched six innings, allowed four hits and recorded six strikeouts, earning the win. Gil started his career with 15 2/3 scoreless innings, the most by any Yankee pitcher since 1961. He is the first pitcher in MLB history with a scoreless start in his first three appearances.

Gil pitched for Scranton/Wilkes-Barre in 2022, and made one appearance for the Yankees (giving up four earned runs in four innings). He injured his elbow during a May 2022 game and required Tommy John surgery, ending his 2022 season. With Scranton, he was 0–3 with a 7.89 ERA in six starts over which he pitched 21 2/3 innings and had a WHIP of 1.662.

He began the 2023 season on the 60-day injured list and returned to action in September 2023, making two rehab starts for High–A Tampa. There, he gave up five earned runs in four innings. Gil did not make an appearance in the majors the 2023 season.

The Yankees named Gil to their starting rotation for the start of the 2024 season, following ace Gerrit Cole's injury during spring training. On May 18, Gil recorded 14 strikeouts against the Chicago White Sox, breaking Orlando Hernández's record (13) for the most by a Yankees rookie. Hernández coincidentally threw out the game's first pitch. Gil received the American League Pitcher of the Month after winning all six of his May starts, and conceding an ERA of only 0.70 with 14 hits in 38 2/3 innings, along with 44 strikeouts. On August 21, the team placed Gil on the 15-day injured list with a lower-back strain, reactivating him on September 5. Gil returned to the Yankees' rotation against the Chicago Cubs on September 6, pitching six scoreless innings and conceding only one hit to earn his 13th win on the season.

After the season, Gil was named AL Rookie of the Year. In 29 total starts for the Yankees in 2024, he posted a 15–7 record and 3.50 ERA with 171 strikeouts across 151 2/3 innings pitched.

On March 3, 2025, Gil was shut down for at least six weeks due to a high-grade lat strain. He was transferred to the 60-day injured list on March 24. Gil was activated for his season debut on August 3. He made 11 starts for New York during the year, compiling a 4–1 record and 3.32 ERA with 41 strikeouts across 57 innings of work.

Gil was optioned to Triple-A Scranton/Wilkes Barre on March 24, 2026. He was called up to the Yankees on April 4, 2026, and placed in the starting rotation. After a rough outing against the Houston Astros, where he allowed six runs in four innings, Gil was optioned back to Triple-A on April 26. On November 20, 2026, he was non-tendered by the Yankees and became a free agent.

== See also ==
- List of Major League Baseball players from the Dominican Republic
- List of Scranton/Wilkes-Barre RailRiders no-hitters
- List of World Series starting pitchers
- New York Yankees award winners and league leaders
