= 2021 Baltimore Orioles season =

Major League Baseball season

2021 Baltimore Orioles
- League: American League
- Division: East
- Ballpark: Oriole Park at Camden Yards
- City: Baltimore, Maryland
- Record: 52–110 (.321)
- Divisional place: 5th
- Owners: Peter Angelos
- General managers: Mike Elias
- Managers: Brandon Hyde
- Television: MASN (Scott Garceau, Ben McDonald, Jim Palmer)
- Radio: WJZ-FM; Baltimore Orioles Radio Network (Kevin Brown, Geoff Arnold, Brett Hollander, Melanie Newman)

The 2021 Baltimore Orioles season was the 121st season in Baltimore Orioles franchise history, the 68th in Baltimore, and the 30th at Oriole Park at Camden Yards. With a final record of 52–110 (.321), the team significantly failed to improve on their 25–35 (.417) record from the previous year. The Orioles endured two different losing streaks of 14 or more between the middle and the end of May, as well as between August 3 and August 24. The Orioles pitching staff combined for an all-time franchise-worst earned run average (ERA) of 5.84 and yielded 911 earned runs in the season, which led MLB and was the most earned runs surrendered by a pitching staff since the 2001 Texas Rangers allowed 913 earned runs. According to Baseball Reference, 25 pitchers finished with negative wins above replacement (WAR), the most in MLB history. This broke the previous record of 22, which was set by the 2019 Orioles. All of the team's pitchers that made a start finished the season with a losing record. The Orioles were eliminated from playoff contention on August 28 with their loss to the Tampa Bay Rays. They suffered their 3rd 100+ loss season in four years with their loss to the Boston Red Sox on September 17. With the Orioles loss in the season finale against the Blue Jays, they suffered their second 110-loss season in team history; it was also the third such season in overall franchise history, going back to their time as the St. Louis Browns.

Despite the team's atrocious performance, Trey Mancini, who missed the 2020 season with colon cancer, won the AL Comeback Player of the Year award.

== Regular season standings ==
=== American League East ===
AL East
| Team | W | L | Pct. | GB | Home | Road |
|---|---|---|---|---|---|---|
| Tampa Bay Rays | 100 | 62 | .617 | — | 52‍–‍29 | 48‍–‍33 |
| Boston Red Sox | 92 | 70 | .568 | 8 | 49‍–‍32 | 43‍–‍38 |
| New York Yankees | 92 | 70 | .568 | 8 | 46‍–‍35 | 46‍–‍35 |
| Toronto Blue Jays | 91 | 71 | .562 | 9 | 47‍–‍33 | 44‍–‍38 |
| Baltimore Orioles | 52 | 110 | .321 | 48 | 27‍–‍54 | 25‍–‍56 |

=== American League Wild Card ===
Division leaders
| Team | W | L | Pct. |
|---|---|---|---|
| Tampa Bay Rays | 100 | 62 | .617 |
| Houston Astros | 95 | 67 | .586 |
| Chicago White Sox | 93 | 69 | .574 |

Wild Card teams (Top 2 teams qualify for postseason)
| Team | W | L | Pct. | GB |
|---|---|---|---|---|
| Boston Red Sox | 92 | 70 | .568 | — |
| New York Yankees | 92 | 70 | .568 | — |
| Toronto Blue Jays | 91 | 71 | .562 | 1 |
| Seattle Mariners | 90 | 72 | .556 | 2 |
| Oakland Athletics | 86 | 76 | .531 | 6 |
| Cleveland Indians | 80 | 82 | .494 | 12 |
| Los Angeles Angels | 77 | 85 | .475 | 15 |
| Detroit Tigers | 77 | 85 | .475 | 15 |
| Kansas City Royals | 74 | 88 | .457 | 18 |
| Minnesota Twins | 73 | 89 | .451 | 19 |
| Texas Rangers | 60 | 102 | .370 | 32 |
| Baltimore Orioles | 52 | 110 | .321 | 40 |

=== Orioles team leaders ===
Batting
| Batting average† | Cedric Mullins | .291 |
| RBIs | Ryan Mountcastle | 89 |
| Home runs | Ryan Mountcastle | 33 |
| Runs scored | Cedric Mullins | 91 |
| Stolen bases | Cedric Mullins | 30 |
Pitching
| Wins | John Means; Matt Harvey | 6 |
| ERA‡ | John Means | 3.62 |
| WHIP‡ | John Means | 1.03 |
| Strikeouts | John Means | 134 |
| Saves | Cole Sulser; César Valdez | 8 |

Updated through game of October 3.
† Minimum 3.1 plate appearances per team games played
AVG qualified batters: Mullins, Mountcastle, Mancini, Hays
‡ Minimum 1 inning pitched per team games played
ERA & WHIP qualified pitchers: No qualifiers

=== Record vs. opponents ===
2021 American League record Source: MLB Standings Grid – 2021
| Team | BAL | BOS | CWS | CLE | DET | HOU | KC | LAA | MIN | NYY | OAK | SEA | TB | TEX | TOR | NL |
|---|---|---|---|---|---|---|---|---|---|---|---|---|---|---|---|---|
| Baltimore | — | 6–13 | 0–7 | 2–5 | 2–5 | 3–3 | 4–3 | 2–4 | 2–4 | 8–11 | 3–3 | 3–4 | 1–18 | 4–3 | 5–14 | 7–13 |
| Boston | 13–6 | — | 3–4 | 4–2 | 3–3 | 2–5 | 5–2 | 3–3 | 5–2 | 10–9 | 3–3 | 4–3 | 8–11 | 3–4 | 10–9 | 16–4 |
| Chicago | 7–0 | 4–3 | — | 10–9 | 12–7 | 2–5 | 9–10 | 2–5 | 13–6 | 1–5 | 4–3 | 3–3 | 3–3 | 5–1 | 4–3 | 14–6 |
| Cleveland | 5–2 | 2–4 | 9–10 | — | 12–7 | 1–6 | 14–5 | 5–1 | 8–11 | 3–4 | 2–4 | 3–4 | 1–6 | 4–2 | 2–5 | 9–11 |
| Detroit | 5–2 | 3–3 | 7–12 | 7–12 | — | 5–2 | 8–11 | 1–6 | 8–11 | 3–3 | 1–6 | 5–1 | 4–3 | 6–1 | 3–3 | 11–9 |
| Houston | 3–3 | 5–2 | 5–2 | 6–1 | 2–5 | — | 3–4 | 13–6 | 3–4 | 2–4 | 11–8 | 11–8 | 4–2 | 14–5 | 4–2 | 9–11 |
| Kansas City | 3–4 | 2–5 | 10–9 | 5–14 | 11–8 | 4–3 | — | 2–4 | 10–9 | 2–4 | 2–5 | 4–3 | 2–4 | 2–4 | 3–4 | 12–8 |
| Los Angeles | 4–2 | 3–3 | 5–2 | 1–5 | 6–1 | 6–13 | 4–2 | — | 5–2 | 4–3 | 4–15 | 8–11 | 1–6 | 11–8 | 4–3 | 11–9 |
| Minnesota | 4–2 | 2–5 | 6–13 | 11–8 | 11–8 | 4–3 | 9–10 | 2–5 | — | 1–6 | 1–5 | 2–4 | 3–3 | 4–3 | 3–4 | 10–10 |
| New York | 11–8 | 9–10 | 5–1 | 4–3 | 3–3 | 4–2 | 4–2 | 3–4 | 6–1 | — | 4–3 | 5–2 | 8–11 | 6–1 | 8–11 | 12–8 |
| Oakland | 3–3 | 3–3 | 3–4 | 4–2 | 6–1 | 8–11 | 5–2 | 15–4 | 5–1 | 3–4 | — | 4–15 | 4–3 | 10–9 | 2–5 | 11–9 |
| Seattle | 4–3 | 3–4 | 3–3 | 4–3 | 1–5 | 8–11 | 3–4 | 11–8 | 4–2 | 2–5 | 15–4 | — | 6–1 | 13–6 | 4–2 | 9–11 |
| Tampa Bay | 18–1 | 11–8 | 3–3 | 6–1 | 3–4 | 2–4 | 4–2 | 6–1 | 3–3 | 11–8 | 3–4 | 1–6 | — | 3–4 | 11–8 | 15–5 |
| Texas | 3–4 | 4–3 | 1–5 | 2–4 | 1–6 | 5–14 | 4–2 | 8–11 | 3–4 | 1–6 | 9–10 | 6–13 | 4–3 | — | 2–4 | 7–13 |
| Toronto | 14–5 | 9–10 | 3–4 | 5–2 | 3–3 | 2–4 | 4–3 | 3–4 | 4–3 | 11–8 | 5–2 | 2–4 | 8–11 | 4–2 | — | 14–6 |

Updated with the results of all games through October 3, 2021.

== Game log ==
Past games legend
| Orioles Win | Orioles Loss | Game postponed | Eliminated from playoff contention |
Bold denotes an Orioles pitcher

2021 game log: 52–110 (Home: 27–54; Away: 25–56)
April: 12–14 (Home: 4–10; Away: 8–4)

| # | Date | Opponent | Score | Win | Loss | Save | Attendance | Record | Streak/ Box |
|---|---|---|---|---|---|---|---|---|---|
| — | April 1 | @ Red Sox | Postponed (rain). Makeup date April 2. | | | | | | |
| 1 | April 2 | @ Red Sox | 3–0 | **Means** (1–0) | Eovaldi (0–1) | **Valdez** (1) | 4,452 | 1–0 | W1 |
| 2 | April 3 | @ Red Sox | 4–2 | **Plutko** (1–0) | Houck (0–1) | **Valdez** (2) | 4,571 | 2–0 | W2 |
| 3 | April 4 | @ Red Sox | 11–3 | **Zimmermann** (1–0) | Richards (0–1) | — | 4,458 | 3–0 | W3 |
| 4 | April 5 | @ Yankees | 0–7 | Montgomery (1–0) | **López** (0–1) | — | 9,008 | 3–1 | L1 |
| 5 | April 6 | @ Yankees | 2–7 | Cole (1–0) | **Kremer** (0–1) | — | 9,404 | 3–2 | L2 |
| 6 | April 7 | @ Yankees | 4–3 (11) | **Valdez** (1–0) | Green (0–1) | **Fry** (1) | 10,254 | 4–2 | W1 |
| 7 | April 8 | Red Sox | 3–7 | Rodríguez (1–0) | **Harvey** (0–1) | — | 10,150 | 4–3 | L1 |
| 8 | April 10 | Red Sox | 4–6 (10) | Barnes (1–0) | **Tate** (0–1) | Andriese (1) | 9,307 | 4–4 | L2 |
| 9 | April 11 | Red Sox | 9–14 | Pivetta (2–0) | **López** (0–2) | — | 8,171 | 4–5 | L3 |
| — | April 12 | Mariners | Postponed (rain). Makeup date April 13 as part of doubleheader. | | | | | | |
| 10 | April 13 | Mariners | 3–4 (8) | Montero (1–0) | **Scott** (0–1) | Graveman (1) | 4,147 (Note: Single-admission doubleheader) | 4–6 | L4 |
| 11 | April 13 | Mariners | 7–6 (7) | **Valdez** (2–0) | Sadler (0–1) | — | 4,147 | 5–6 | W1 |
| — | April 14 | Mariners | Postponed (rain). Makeup date April 15 as part of doubleheader. | | | | | | |
| 12 | April 15 | Mariners | 2–4 (7) | Gonzales (1–1) | **Scott** (0–2) | Graveman (2) | 5,060 (Note: Single-admission doubleheader) | 5–7 | L1 |
| 13 | April 15 | Mariners | 1–2 (7) | Dunn (1–0) | **Zimmermann** (1–1) | Middleton (2) | 5,060 | 5–8 | L2 |
| 14 | April 16 | @ Rangers | 5–2 | **López** (1–2) | Foltynewicz (0–3) | **Valdez** (3) | 22,173 | 6–8 | W1 |
| 15 | April 17 | @ Rangers | 6–1 | **Lakins** (1–0) | Rodríguez (0–1) | — | 29,338 | 7–8 | W2 |
| 16 | April 18 | @ Rangers | 0–1 (10) | King (1–0) | **Lakins** (1–1) | — | 24,267 | 7–9 | L1 |
| 17 | April 20 | @ Marlins | 7–5 | **Harvey** (1–1) | Neidert (0–1) | **Valdez** (4) | 4,540 | 8–9 | W1 |
| 18 | April 21 | @ Marlins | 0–3 | Rogers (1–2) | **Zimmermann** (1–2) | García (4) | 4,028 | 8–10 | L1 |
| 19 | April 23 | Athletics | 1–3 | Irvin (2–2) | **López** (1–3) | Diekman (2) | 7,574 | 8–11 | L2 |
| 20 | April 24 | Athletics | 2–7 | Bassitt (2–2) | **LeBlanc** (0–1) | — | 7,616 | 8–12 | L3 |
| 21 | April 25 | Athletics | 8–1 | **Means** (2–0) | Luzardo (1–2) | — | 8,107 | 9–12 | W1 |
| 22 | April 26 | Yankees | 4–2 | **Harvey** (2–1) | García (0–1) | **Valdez** (5) | 6,367 | 10–12 | W2 |
| 23 | April 27 | Yankees | 1–5 | Kluber (1–2) | **Zimmermann** (1–3) | — | 6,662 | 10–13 | L1 |
| 24 | April 28 | Yankees | 0–7 | Germán (2–2) | **Kremer** (0–2) | — | 7,338 | 10–14 | L2 |
| 25 | April 29 | Yankees | 4–3 (10) | **Scott** (1–2) | Loaisiga (2–1) | — | 7,738 | 11–14 | W1 |
| 26 | April 30 | @ Athletics | 3–2 | **Means** (3–0) | Fiers (0–1) | **Valdez** (6) | 5,777 | 12–14 | W2 |

May: 5–23 (Home: 2–9; Away: 3–14)

| # | Date | Opponent | Score | Win | Loss | Save | Attendance | Record | Streak/Box |
|---|---|---|---|---|---|---|---|---|---|
| 27 | May 1 | @ Athletics | 8–4 | **Harvey** (3–1) | Luzardo (1–3) | — | 6,469 | 13–14 | W3 |
| 28 | May 2 | @ Athletics | 5–7 | Petit (4–0) | **Lakins** (1–2) | Trivino (5) | 5,862 | 13–15 | L1 |
| 29 | May 3 | @ Mariners | 5–3 | **Sulser** (1–0) | Misiewicz (2–1) | **Valdez** (7) | 5,776 | 14–15 | W1 |
| 30 | May 4 | @ Mariners | 2–5 | Montero (3–1) | **Lakins** (1–3) | — | 6,504 | 14–16 | L1 |
| 31 | May 5 | @ Mariners | 6–0 | **Means** (4–0) | Kikuchi (1–2) | — | 6,742 | 15–16 | W1 |
| 32 | May 7 | Red Sox | 2–6 | Rodríguez (5–0) | **Harvey** (3–2) | — | 7,724 | 15–17 | L1 |
| 33 | May 8 | Red Sox | 6–11 | Richards (2–2) | **Lowther** (0–1) | — | 10,598 | 15–18 | L2 |
| 34 | May 9 | Red Sox | 3–4 | Pivetta (5–0) | **Kremer** (0–3) | Barnes (8) | 10,274 | 15–19 | L3 |
| 35 | May 10 | Red Sox | 4–1 | **Scott** (2–2) | Andriese (1–2) | **Valdez** (8) | 6,826 | 16–19 | W1 |
| 36 | May 11 | @ Mets | 2–3 | Familia (1–0) | **Valdez** (2–1) | — | 7,930 | 16–20 | L1 |
| 37 | May 12 | @ Mets | 1–7 | Walker (3–1) | **Harvey** (3–3) | — | 8,035 | 16–21 | L2 |
| 38 | May 14 | Yankees | 4–5 | Kluber (3–2) | **Lakins** (1–4) | Loáisiga (2) | 10,809 | 16–22 | L3 |
| 39 | May 15 | Yankees | 2–8 | Germán (3–2) | **López** (1–4) | — | 10,767 | 16–23 | L4 |
| 40 | May 16 | Yankees | 10–6 | **Zimmermann** (2–3) | King (0–1) | — | 11,070 | 17–23 | W1 |
| 41 | May 18 | Rays | 6–13 | Kittredge (4–0) | **Harvey** (3–4) | — | 5,429 | 17–24 | L1 |
| 42 | May 19 | Rays | 7–9 | Thompson (3–2) | **Fry** (0–1) | Fairbanks (1) | 6,581 | 17–25 | L2 |
| 43 | May 20 | Rays | 1–10 | Hill (3–1) | **Kremer** (0–4) | — | 6,916 | 17–26 | L3 |
| 44 | May 21 | @ Nationals | 2–4 | Strasburg (1–1) | **López** (1–5) | — | 14,369 | 17–27 | L4 |
| 45 | May 22 | @ Nationals | 9–12 | Hudson (3–0) | **Plutko** (1–1) | Hand (6) | 15,440 | 17–28 | L5 |
| 46 | May 23 | @ Nationals | 5–6 | Corbin (3–3) | **Harvey** (3–5) | Hand (7) | 14,618 | 17–29 | L6 |
| 47 | May 24 | @ Twins | 3–8 | Alcalá (1–1) | **Scott** (2–3) | — | 8,530 | 17–30 | L7 |
| 48 | May 25 | @ Twins | 4–7 | Berríos (5–2) | **Kremer** (0–5) | Rogers (3) | 9,969 | 17–31 | L8 |
| 49 | May 26 | @ Twins | 2–3 | Pineda (3–2) | **López** (1–6) | Robles (3) | 10,574 | 17–32 | L9 |
| 50 | May 27 | @ White Sox | 1–5 | Cease (3–1) | **Tate** (0–2) | — | 9,671 | 17–33 | L10 |
| — | May 28 | @ White Sox | Postponed (rain). Makeup date May 29 as part of doubleheader. | | | | | | |
| 51 | May 29 | @ White Sox | 4–7 (7) | Keuchel (4–1) | **Harvey** (3–6) | Hendriks (11) | 20,029 (Note: Single-admission doubleheader) | 17–34 | L11 |
| 52 | May 29 | @ White Sox | 1–3 (7) | Lynn (6–1) | **Means** (4–1) | Hendriks (12) | 20,029 | 17–35 | L12 |
| 53 | May 30 | @ White Sox | 1–3 | Giolito (5–4) | **Tate** (0–3) | Hendriks (13) | 21,067 | 17–36 | L13 |
| 54 | May 31 | Twins | 2–3 (10) | Rogers (3–3) | **Plutko** (1–2) | Robles (4) | 11,010 | 17–37 | L14 |

June: 10–17 (Home: 6–7; Away: 4–10)

| # | Date | Opponent | Score | Win | Loss | Save | Attendance | Record | Streak/Box |
|---|---|---|---|---|---|---|---|---|---|
| 55 | June 1 | Twins | 7–4 | **Zimmermann** (3–3) | Pineda (3–3) | **Sulser** (1) | 5,337 | 18–37 | W1 |
| 56 | June 2 | Twins | 6–3 | **T. Wells** (1–0) | Dobnak (1–5) | — | 5,945 | 19–37 | W2 |
| 57 | June 4 | Indians | 3–1 | **Sulser** (2–0) | Shaw (1–1) | **Fry** (2) | 12,009 | 20–37 | W3 |
| 58 | June 5 | Indians | 4–10 | Civale (8–2) | **Means** (4–2) | — | 9,969 | 20–38 | L1 |
| 59 | June 6 | Indians | 18–5 | **López** (2–6) | Quantrill (0–2) | — | 9,423 | 21–38 | W1 |
| 60 | June 8 | Mets | 10–3 | **Zimmermann** (4–3) | Peterson (1–5) | — | 9,431 | 22–38 | W2 |
| 61 | June 9 | Mets | 1–14 | Walker (5–2) | **Harvey** (3–7) | — | 9,584 | 22–39 | L1 |
| 62 | June 11 | @ Rays | 2–4 | Yarbrough (4–3) | **Akin** (0–1) | Fairbanks (2) | 6,211 | 22–40 | L2 |
| 63 | June 12 | @ Rays | 4–5 | McHugh (1–1) | **López** (2–7) | Castillo (11) | 9,225 | 22–41 | L3 |
| 64 | June 13 | @ Rays | 1–7 | Fleming (6–4) | **Zimmermann** (4–4) | — | 9,101 | 22–42 | L4 |
| 65 | June 14 | @ Indians | 3–4 | Sandlin (1–0) | **Kremer** (0–6) | Clase (10) | 11,181 | 22–43 | L5 |
| 66 | June 15 | @ Indians | 2–7 | Karinchak (4–2) | **Harvey** (3–8) | — | 12,025 | 22–44 | L6 |
| 67 | June 16 | @ Indians | 7–8 | Civale (10–2) | **Akin** (0–2) | Clase (11) | 12,825 | 22–45 | L7 |
| 68 | June 17 | @ Indians | 3–10 | Stephan (1–0) | **López** (2–8) | — | 15,121 | 22–46 | L8 |
| 67 | June 18 | Blue Jays | 7–1 | **T. Wells** (2–0) | Ray (4–3) | — | 13,284 | 23–46 | W1 |
| 70 | June 19 | Blue Jays | 7–10 | Romano (4–1) | **Fry** (0–2) | — | 10,721 | 23–47 | L1 |
| 71 | June 20 | Blue Jays | 4–7 | Ryu (6–4) | **Harvey** (3–9) | Chatwood (1) | 14,917 | 23–48 | L2 |
| 72 | June 21 | Astros | 2–10 | Odorizzi (2–3) | **Akin** (0–3) | — | 7,414 | 23–49 | L3 |
| 73 | June 22 | Astros | 1–3 | Greinke (8–2) | **López** (2–9) | Pressly (11) | 8,510 | 23–50 | L4 |
| 74 | June 23 | Astros | 0–13 | Urquidy (6–3) | **Eshelman** (0–1) | — | 10,013 | 23–51 | L5 |
| 75 | June 24 | @ Blue Jays | 0–9 | Kay (1–2) | **Kremer** (0–7) | — | 6,264 | 23–52 | L6 |
| 76 | June 25 | @ Blue Jays | 6–5 (10) | **Fry** (1–2) | Thornton (1–3) | **Sulser** (2) | 7,844 | 24–52 | W1 |
| 77 | June 26 | @ Blue Jays | 4–12 | Ryu (7–4) | **Akin** (0–4) | — | 5,913 | 24–53 | L1 |
| 78 | June 27 | @ Blue Jays | 2–5 | Stripling (3–4) | **López** (2–10) | Romano (6) | 6,044 | 24–54 | L2 |
| 79 | June 28 | @ Astros | 9–7 | **Fry** (2–2) | Bielak (2–3) | **Plutko** (1) | 24,419 | 25–54 | W1 |
| 80 | June 29 | @ Astros | 13–3 | **A. Wells** (1–0) | Garza (0–2) | **Tate** (1) | 30,346 | 26–54 | W2 |
| 81 | June 30 | @ Astros | 5–2 | **Scott** (3–3) | García (6–5) | **Sulser** (3) | 28,124 | 27–54 | W3 |

July: 10–12 (Home: 5–4; Away: 5–7)

| # | Date | Opponent | Score | Win | Loss | Save | Attendance | Record | Streak/Box |
|---|---|---|---|---|---|---|---|---|---|
| 82 | July 2 | @ Angels | 7–8 | Iglesias (5–3) | **Fry** (2–3) | — | 23,561 | 27–55 | L1 |
| 83 | July 3 | @ Angels | 1–4 | Cobb (6–3) | **López** (2–11) | Iglesias (16) | 28,160 | 27–56 | L2 |
| 84 | July 4 | @ Angels | 5–6 | Iglesias (6–3) | **Sulser** (2–1) | — | 18,955 | 27–57 | L3 |
| 85 | July 6 | Blue Jays | 7–5 | **Watkins** (1–0) | Matz (7–4) | — | 7,388 | 28–57 | W1 |
| 86 | July 7 | Blue Jays | 2–10 | Ryu (8–5) | **Harvey** (3–10) | — | 7,457 | 28–58 | L1 |
| — | July 8 | Blue Jays | Postponed (rain). Makeup date September 11 as part of doubleheader. | | | | | | |
| 87 | July 9 | White Sox | 1–12 | Keuchel (7–3) | **López** (2–12) | — | 12,077 | 28–59 | L2 |
| 88 | July 10 | White Sox | 3–8 | Giolito (7–6) | **Eshelman** (0–2) | Hendriks (23) | 26,391 | 28–60 | L3 |
| 89 | July 11 | White Sox | 5–7 (10) | Hendriks (4–2) | **T. Wells** (2–1) | Foster (1) | 11,600 | 28–61 | L4 |
| ASG | July 13 | @ Coors Field | AL vs. NL | Ohtani (1–0) | Burnes (0–1) | Hendriks (1) | 49,184 | — | N/A |
| 90 | July 16 | @ Royals | 2–9 | Staumont (1–2) | **Akin** (0–5) | — | 23,763 | 28–62 | L5 |
| 91 | July 17 | @ Royals | 8–4 | **Fry** (3–3) | Singer (3–7) | — | 27,292 | 29–62 | W1 |
| 92 | July 18 | @ Royals | 5–0 | **Harvey** (4–10) | Hernández (1–1) | — | 13,706 | 30–62 | W2 |
| 93 | July 19 | @ Rays | 6–1 | **Watkins** (2–0) | Yarbrough (6–4) | — | 9,922 | 31–62 | W3 |
| 94 | July 20 | @ Rays | 3–9 | McClanahan (4–3) | **Means** (4–3) | — | 10,399 | 31–63 | L1 |
| 95 | July 21 | @ Rays | 4–5 | McHugh (3–1) | **Scott** (3–4) | — | 8,968 | 31–64 | L2 |
| 96 | July 23 | Nationals | 6–1 | **Fry** (4–3) | Corbin (6–9) | — | 17,022 | 32–64 | W1 |
| 97 | July 24 | Nationals | 5–3 | **Harvey** (5–10) | Lester (3–5) | **Tate** (2) | 30,898 | 33–64 | W2 |
| 98 | July 25 | Nationals | 5–4 | **Sulser** (3–1) | Hand (5–4) | — | 15,690 | 34–64 | W3 |
| 99 | July 27 | Marlins | 3–7 | Alcántara (6–9) | **Watkins** (2–1) | — | 10,098 | 34–65 | L1 |
| 100 | July 28 | Marlins | 8–7 | **Scott** (4–4) | Okert (0–1) | — | 8,363 | 35–65 | W1 |
| 101 | July 29 | @ Tigers | 2–6 | Mize (6–5) | **A. Wells** (1–1) | — | 15,833 | 35–66 | L1 |
| 102 | July 30 | @ Tigers | 4–3 | **Harvey** (6–10) | Skubal (6–10) | **Sulser** (4) | 18,861 | 36–66 | W1 |
| 103 | July 31 | @ Tigers | 5–2 | **Means** (5–3) | Manning (2–4) | **Sulser** (5) | 25,132 | 37–66 | W2 |

August: 4–24 (Home: 2–13; Away: 2–11)

| # | Date | Opponent | Score | Win | Loss | Save | Attendance | Record | Streak/Box |
|---|---|---|---|---|---|---|---|---|---|
| 104 | August 1 | @ Tigers | 2–6 | Ramírez (1–0) | **Watkins** (2–2) | — | 17,134 | 37–67 | L1 |
| 105 | August 2 | @ Yankees | 7–1 | **López** (3–12) | Heaney (6–8) | — | 28,879 | 38–67 | W1 |
| 106 | August 3 | @ Yankees | 1–13 | Gil (1–0) | **Wells** (1–2) | — | 30,815 | 38–68 | L1 |
| 107 | August 4 | @ Yankees | 3–10 | Loáisiga (8–4) | **Sulser** (3–2) | — | 30,055 | 38–69 | L2 |
| 108 | August 6 | Rays | 6–10 | Rasmussen (1–1) | **Fry** (4–4) | — | 11,320 | 38–70 | L3 |
| 109 | August 7 | Rays | 3–12 | McClanahan (6–4) | **Watkins** (2–3) | — | 18,545 | 38–71 | L4 |
| 110 | August 8 | Rays | 6–9 | Chargois (2–0) | **Fry** (4–5) | — | 10,576 | 38–72 | L5 |
| 111 | August 10 | Tigers | 4–9 | Funkhouser (6–1) | **Akin** (0–6) | — | 7,124 | 38–73 | L6 |
| 112 | August 11 | Tigers | 2–5 | Skubal (8–10) | **Harvey** (6–11) | Soto (14) | 8,990 | 38–74 | L7 |
| 113 | August 12 | Tigers | 4–6 | Manning (3–5) | **Means** (5–4) | Fulmer (7) | 8,382 | 38–75 | L8 |
| 114 | August 13 | @ Red Sox | 1–8 | Pivetta (9–5) | **Watkins** (2–4) | Richards (1) | 28,022 | 38–76 | L9 |
| 115 | August 14 | @ Red Sox | 2–16 | Sale (1–0) | **López** (3–13) | — | 33,118 | 38–77 | L10 |
| 116 | August 15 | @ Red Sox | 2–6 | Rodríguez (9–6) | **Akin** (0–7) | — | 28,935 | 38–78 | L11 |
| 117 | August 16 | @ Rays | 2–9 | Fleming (10–6) | **Harvey** (6–12) | — | 5,460 | 38–79 | L12 |
| 118 | August 17 | @ Rays | 0–10 | Ellis (1–0) | **Means** (5–5) | — | 4,795 | 38–80 | L13 |
| 119 | August 18 | @ Rays | 4–8 | Yarbrough (7–4) | **Watkins** (2–5) | — | 6,673 | 38–81 | L14 |
| 120 | August 19 | @ Rays | 2–7 | McClanahan (8–4) | **López** (3–14) | — | 5,826 | 38–82 | L15 |
| 121 | August 20 | Braves | 0–3 | Fried (11–7) | **Akin** (0–8) | — | 13,583 | 38–83 | L16 |
| 122 | August 21 | Braves | 4–5 | Smyly (9–3) | **Harvey** (6–13) | Smith (27) | 15,774 | 38–84 | L17 |
| 123 | August 22 | Braves | 1–3 | Toussaint (3–2) | **Means** (5–6) | Smith (28) | 11,180 | 38–85 | L18 |
| 124 | August 24 | Angels | 8–14 | Guerra (4–2) | **Watkins** (2–6) | — | 8,781 | 38–86 | L19 |
| 125 | August 25 | Angels | 10–6 | **Scott** (5–4) | Petricka (0–1) | — | 15,867 | 39–86 | W1 |
| 126 | August 26 | Angels | 13–1 | **Akin** (1–8) | Peguero (0–1) | — | 10,211 | 40–86 | W2 |
| 127 | August 27 | Rays | 3–6 | McClanahan (9–4) | **Harvey** (6–14) | Mazza (1) | 7,155 | 40–87 | L1 |
| 128 | August 28 | Rays | 3–4 | Chargois (4–0) | **Sulser** (3–3) | Kittredge (4) | 11,110 | 40–88 | L2 |
| 129 | August 29 | Rays | 8–12 | Chargois (5–0) | **Watkins** (2–7) | — | 8,353 | 40–89 | L3 |
| 130 | August 30 | @ Blue Jays | 3–7 | Ray (10–5) | **Tate** (0–4) | Romano (14) | 14,406 | 40–90 | L4 |
| 131 | August 31 | @ Blue Jays | 4–2 | **Akin** (2–8) | Ryu (12–8) | **Sulser** (6) | 13,963 | 41–90 | W1 |

September/October: 11–20 (Home: 8–10; Away: 3–10)

| # | Date | Opponent | Score | Win | Loss | Save | Attendance | Record | Streak/Box |
|---|---|---|---|---|---|---|---|---|---|
| 132 | September 1 | @ Blue Jays | 4–5 | Mayza (5–2) | **Tate** (0–5) | Romano (15) | 14,262 | 41–91 | L1 |
| 133 | September 3 | @ Yankees | 3–4 (10) | Holmes (6–2) | **Tate** (0–6) | — | 34,085 | 41–92 | L2 |
| 134 | September 4 | @ Yankees | 4–3 | **Sulser** (4–3) | Chapman (5–4) | — | 34,571 | 42–92 | W1 |
| 135 | September 5 | @ Yankees | 8–7 | **Diplán** (1–0) | Heaney (8–9) | **T. Wells** (1) | 33,091 | 43–92 | W2 |
| 136 | September 6 | Royals | 2–3 | Tapia (2–0) | **Sulser** (4–4) | Barlow (11) | 11,973 | 43–93 | L1 |
| 137 | September 7 | Royals | 7–3 | **Baumann** (1–0) | Kowar (0–3) | — | 4,981 | 44–93 | W1 |
| 138 | September 8 | Royals | 9–8 | **Barreda** (1–0) | Staumont (3–3) | **T. Wells** (2) | 4,965 | 45–93 | W2 |
| 139 | September 9 | Royals | 0–6 | Hernández (6–1) | **Means** (5–7) | — | 5,087 | 45–94 | L1 |
| 140 | September 10 | Blue Jays | 6–3 | **Greene** (1–0) | Merryweather (0–1) | **Sulser** (7) | 11,851 | 46–94 | W1 |
| 141 | September 11 (1) | Blue Jays | 10–11 | Pearson (1–1) | **T. Wells** (2–2) | Romano (17) | N/A | 46–95 | L1 |
| 142 | September 11 (2) | Blue Jays | 2–11 | Richards (7–2) | **Akin** (2–9) | — | 10,219 | 46–96 | L2 |
| 143 | September 12 | Blue Jays | 7–22 | Matz (12–7) | **Lowther** (0–2) | — | 8,474 | 46–97 | L3 |
| 144 | September 14 | Yankees | 2–7 | Cole (15–7) | **A. Wells** (1–3) | — | 10,235 | 46–98 | L4 |
| 145 | September 15 | Yankees | 3–4 | Peralta (5–3) | **T. Wells** (2–3) | Chapman (27) | 10,402 | 46–99 | L5 |
| 146 | September 16 | Yankees | 3–2 (10) | **Sulser** (5–4) | Peralta (5–4) | — | 20,164 | 47–99 | W1 |
| 147 | September 17 | @ Red Sox | 1–7 | Sale (4–0) | **Akin** (2–10) | — | 29,811 | 47–100 | L1 |
| 148 | September 18 | @ Red Sox | 3–9 | Houck (1–4) | **Baumann** (1–1) | — | 30,027 | 47–101 | L2 |
| 149 | September 19 | @ Red Sox | 6–8 | Sawamura (5–1) | **Greene** (1–1) | Richards (3) | 27,010 | 47–102 | L3 |
| 150 | September 20 | @ Phillies | 2–0 | **Means** (6–7) | Suárez (6–5) | **T. Wells** (3) | 21,440 | 48–102 | W1 |
| 151 | September 21 | @ Phillies | 2–3 (10) | Kennedy (3–1) | **Valdez** (2–2) | — | 18,955 | 48–103 | L1 |
| 152 | September 22 | @ Phillies | 3–4 | Alvarado (7–1) | **Greene** (1–2) | Kennedy (25) | 18,133 | 48–104 | L2 |
| 153 | September 23 | Rangers | 3–0 | **Lowther** (1–2) | Otto (0–3) | **T. Wells** (4) | 6,328 | 49–104 | W1 |
| 154 | September 24 | Rangers | 5–8 | Sborz (4–3) | **Greene** (1–3) | Barlow (8) | 7,935 | 49–105 | L1 |
| 155 | September 25 | Rangers | 3–2 | **Kriske** (2–1) | Lyles (9–13) | **Tate** (3) | 10,645 | 50–105 | W1 |
| 156 | September 26 | Rangers | 4–7 | Cotton (2–0) | **Means** (6–8) | Barlow (9) | 13,495 | 50–106 | L1 |
| 157 | September 28 | Red Sox | 4–2 | **Diplán** (2–0) | Sale (5–1) | **Sulser** (8) | 8,098 | 51–106 | W1 |
| 158 | September 29 | Red Sox | 0–6 | Eovaldi (11–9) | **Lowther** (1–3) | — | 8,732 | 51–107 | L1 |
| 159 | September 30 | Red Sox | 6–2 | **A. Wells** (2–3) | Pivetta (9–8) | — | 13,012 | 52–107 | W1 |
| 160 | October 1 | @ Blue Jays | 4–6 | Matz (14–7) | **Eshelman** (0–3) | Romano (23) | 28,855 | 52–108 | L1 |
| 161 | October 2 | @ Blue Jays | 1–10 | Manoah (9–2) | **Means** (6–9) | — | 29,916 | 52–109 | L2 |
| 162 | October 3 | @ Blue Jays | 4–12 | Ryu (14–10) | **Zimmermann** (4–5) | — | 29,942 | 52–110 | L3 |

== Roster ==
2021 Baltimore Orioles
Roster
| Pitchers: 58 Fernando Abad; 45 Keegan Akin; 81 Shaun Anderson; 43 Shawn Armstrong; 84 Manny Barreda; 53 Mike Baumann; 71 Zack Burdi; 78 Marcos Diplán; 75 Chris Ellis; 73 Tom Eshelman; 77 Jay Flaa; 51 Paul Fry; 71,81 Conner Greene; 63 Eric Hanhold; 56 Hunter Harvey; 32 Matt Harvey; 76 Mickey Jannis; 67 Dusten Knight; 87 Joey Krehbiel; 64 Dean Kremer; 86 Brooks Kriske; 70 Travis Lakins; 49 Wade LeBlanc; 48 Jorge López; 59 Zac Lowther; 60 Isaac Mattson; 47 John Means; 35 Adam Plutko; 67 Mac Sceroler; 66 Tanner Scott; 54 Cole Sulser; 55 Dillon Tate; 62 César Valdez; 49 Brandon Waddell; 79 Konner Wade; 80 Spenser Watkins; 52 Alexander Wells; 68 Tyler Wells; 50 Bruce Zimmermann | Catchers: 72 Nick Ciuffo; 28 Pedro Severino; 15 Chance Sisco; 61 Austin Wynns; Infielders: 3 Maikel Franco; 2 Freddy Galvis; 82 Kelvin Gutiérrez; 37 Jahmai Jones; 75 Domingo Leyba; 16 Trey Mancini; 1 Richie Martin; 26 Jorge Mateo; 6 Ryan Mountcastle; 14 Rio Ruiz; 29 Ramón Urías; 11 Pat Valaika; 12 Stevie Wilkerson | Outfielders: 21 Austin Hays; 65 Ryan McKenna; 31 Cedric Mullins; 41 Tyler Nevin; 25 Anthony Santander; 24 D. J. Stewart | Manager: 18 Brandon Hyde; Coaches: 88 Ben Carhart (bullpen catcher); 34 Tim Cossins (field coordinator/catching); 57 Fredi González (coach); 27 José Hernández (assistant hitting); 40 Darren Holmes (assistant pitching); 38 Chris Holt (pitching); 30 Don Long (hitting); 36 Tony Mansolino (third base); 93 Joel Polanco (bullpen catcher); 9 Anthony Sanders (first base) |

== Player stats ==
=== Batting ===
Note: G = Games played; AB = At bats; R = Runs; H = Hits; 2B = Doubles; 3B = Triples; HR = Home runs; RBI = Runs batted in; SB = Stolen bases; BB = Walks; AVG = Batting average; SLG = Slugging average

| Player | G | AB | R | H | 2B | 3B | HR | RBI | SB | BB | AVG | SLG |
|---|---|---|---|---|---|---|---|---|---|---|---|---|
| Cedric Mullins | 159 | 602 | 91 | 175 | 37 | 5 | 30 | 59 | 30 | 59 | .291 | .518 |
| Trey Mancini | 147 | 556 | 77 | 142 | 33 | 1 | 21 | 71 | 0 | 51 | .255 | .432 |
| Ryan Mountcastle | 144 | 534 | 77 | 136 | 23 | 1 | 33 | 89 | 4 | 41 | .255 | .487 |
| Austin Hays | 131 | 488 | 73 | 125 | 26 | 4 | 22 | 71 | 4 | 28 | .256 | .461 |
| Anthony Santander | 110 | 406 | 54 | 98 | 24 | 0 | 18 | 50 | 1 | 23 | .241 | .433 |
| Pedro Severino | 113 | 379 | 32 | 94 | 18 | 0 | 11 | 46 | 0 | 34 | .248 | .383 |
| Maikel Franco | 104 | 377 | 31 | 79 | 22 | 0 | 11 | 47 | 0 | 20 | .210 | .355 |
| DJ Stewart | 100 | 270 | 39 | 55 | 10 | 0 | 12 | 33 | 0 | 44 | .204 | .374 |
| Ramón Urías | 85 | 262 | 33 | 73 | 14 | 0 | 7 | 38 | 1 | 28 | .279 | .412 |
| Pat Valaika | 90 | 259 | 17 | 52 | 8 | 0 | 5 | 25 | 1 | 16 | .201 | .290 |
| Freddy Galvis | 72 | 249 | 36 | 62 | 12 | 1 | 9 | 26 | 1 | 18 | .249 | .414 |
| Ryan McKenna | 90 | 169 | 20 | 31 | 6 | 1 | 2 | 14 | 1 | 24 | .183 | .266 |
| Kelvin Gutiérrez | 47 | 137 | 14 | 34 | 4 | 1 | 2 | 12 | 0 | 13 | .248 | .336 |
| Austin Wynns | 45 | 130 | 14 | 24 | 4 | 0 | 4 | 14 | 1 | 8 | .185 | .308 |
| Jorge Mateo | 32 | 107 | 9 | 30 | 7 | 1 | 2 | 8 | 5 | 7 | .280 | .421 |
| Richie Martin | 37 | 98 | 9 | 23 | 2 | 0 | 1 | 8 | 0 | 4 | .235 | .286 |
| Rio Ruiz | 32 | 90 | 10 | 15 | 3 | 0 | 3 | 6 | 2 | 9 | .167 | .300 |
| Stevie Wilkerson | 30 | 72 | 5 | 12 | 3 | 0 | 0 | 2 | 2 | 3 | .167 | .208 |
| Jahmai Jones | 26 | 67 | 5 | 10 | 3 | 0 | 0 | 3 | 1 | 4 | .149 | .194 |
| Chance Sisco | 23 | 65 | 4 | 10 | 2 | 0 | 0 | 3 | 0 | 6 | .154 | .185 |
| Domingo Leyba | 21 | 65 | 5 | 10 | 1 | 0 | 1 | 4 | 0 | 6 | .154 | .215 |
| Tyler Nevin | 6 | 14 | 3 | 4 | 2 | 0 | 1 | 3 | 0 | 4 | .286 | .643 |
| Nick Ciuffo | 2 | 5 | 0 | 1 | 1 | 0 | 0 | 0 | 0 | 1 | .200 | .400 |
| Pitcher totals | 162 | 19 | 0 | 1 | 1 | 0 | 0 | 0 | 0 | 0 | .053 | .105 |
| Team totals | 162 | 5420 | 659 | 1296 | 266 | 15 | 195 | 632 | 54 | 951 | .239 | .402 |

=== Pitching ===
Note: W = Wins; L = Losses; ERA = Earned run average; G = Games pitched; GS = Games started; SV = Saves; IP = Innings pitched; H = Hits allowed; R = Runs allowed; ER = Earned runs allowed; BB = Walks allowed; SO = Strikeouts

| Player | W | L | ERA | G | GS | SV | IP | H | R | ER | BB | SO |
|---|---|---|---|---|---|---|---|---|---|---|---|---|
| John Means | 6 | 9 | 3.62 | 26 | 26 | 0 | 146.2 | 125 | 64 | 59 | 26 | 134 |
| Matt Harvey | 6 | 14 | 6.27 | 28 | 28 | 0 | 127.2 | 160 | 96 | 89 | 37 | 95 |
| Jorge López | 3 | 14 | 6.07 | 33 | 25 | 0 | 121.2 | 142 | 83 | 82 | 56 | 112 |
| Keegan Akin | 2 | 10 | 6.63 | 24 | 17 | 0 | 95.0 | 110 | 70 | 70 | 40 | 82 |
| Dillon Tate | 0 | 6 | 4.39 | 62 | 0 | 3 | 67.2 | 61 | 35 | 33 | 23 | 49 |
| Bruce Zimmermann | 4 | 5 | 5.04 | 14 | 13 | 0 | 64.1 | 75 | 37 | 36 | 22 | 56 |
| Cole Sulser | 5 | 4 | 2.70 | 60 | 0 | 8 | 63.1 | 48 | 20 | 19 | 23 | 73 |
| Tyler Wells | 2 | 3 | 4.11 | 44 | 0 | 4 | 57.0 | 40 | 27 | 26 | 12 | 65 |
| Adam Plutko | 1 | 2 | 6.71 | 38 | 1 | 1 | 56.1 | 65 | 43 | 42 | 27 | 44 |
| Spenser Watkins | 2 | 7 | 8.07 | 16 | 10 | 0 | 54.2 | 74 | 50 | 49 | 19 | 35 |
| Tanner Scott | 5 | 4 | 5.17 | 62 | 0 | 0 | 54.0 | 48 | 34 | 31 | 37 | 70 |
| Dean Kremer | 0 | 7 | 7.55 | 13 | 13 | 0 | 53.2 | 63 | 46 | 45 | 25 | 47 |
| Paul Fry | 4 | 5 | 6.08 | 52 | 0 | 2 | 47.1 | 37 | 34 | 32 | 35 | 60 |
| César Valdez | 2 | 2 | 5.87 | 39 | 0 | 8 | 46.0 | 62 | 32 | 30 | 14 | 45 |
| Alexander Wells | 2 | 3 | 6.75 | 11 | 8 | 0 | 42.2 | 53 | 32 | 32 | 16 | 26 |
| Marcos Diplán | 2 | 0 | 4.50 | 23 | 0 | 0 | 30.0 | 22 | 16 | 15 | 15 | 24 |
| Zac Lowther | 1 | 3 | 6.67 | 10 | 6 | 0 | 29.2 | 36 | 23 | 22 | 13 | 30 |
| Travis Lakins Sr. | 1 | 4 | 5.79 | 24 | 1 | 0 | 28.0 | 23 | 20 | 18 | 17 | 24 |
| Thomas Eshelman | 0 | 3 | 7.16 | 9 | 6 | 0 | 27.2 | 34 | 22 | 22 | 10 | 11 |
| Chris Ellis | 0 | 0 | 2.49 | 6 | 6 | 0 | 25.1 | 18 | 7 | 7 | 13 | 16 |
| Connor Greene | 1 | 3 | 7.71 | 22 | 1 | 0 | 23.1 | 30 | 20 | 20 | 12 | 24 |
| Shawn Armstrong | 0 | 0 | 8.55 | 20 | 0 | 0 | 20.0 | 28 | 20 | 19 | 10 | 22 |
| Fernando Abad | 0 | 0 | 5.60 | 16 | 0 | 0 | 17.2 | 23 | 12 | 11 | 7 | 10 |
| Konner Wade | 0 | 0 | 11.68 | 7 | 0 | 0 | 12.1 | 23 | 16 | 16 | 5 | 11 |
| Eric Hanhold | 0 | 0 | 6.97 | 10 | 0 | 0 | 10.1 | 13 | 9 | 8 | 3 | 6 |
| Mike Baumann | 1 | 1 | 9.90 | 4 | 0 | 0 | 10.0 | 13 | 12 | 11 | 6 | 5 |
| Shaun Anderson | 0 | 0 | 9.00 | 7 | 0 | 0 | 10.0 | 17 | 15 | 10 | 5 | 7 |
| Hunter Harvey | 0 | 0 | 4.15 | 9 | 0 | 0 | 8.2 | 8 | 4 | 4 | 3 | 6 |
| Dusten Knight | 0 | 0 | 9.35 | 7 | 0 | 0 | 8.2 | 11 | 10 | 9 | 5 | 11 |
| Mac Sceroler | 0 | 0 | 14.09 | 5 | 0 | 0 | 7.2 | 15 | 15 | 12 | 7 | 11 |
| Joey Krehbiel | 0 | 0 | 4.91 | 5 | 0 | 0 | 7.1 | 5 | 4 | 4 | 4 | 5 |
| Wade LeBlanc | 0 | 1 | 9.45 | 6 | 1 | 0 | 6.2 | 11 | 7 | 7 | 1 | 6 |
| Isaac Mattson | 0 | 0 | 6.23 | 4 | 0 | 0 | 4.1 | 5 | 3 | 3 | 5 | 3 |
| Brooks Kriske | 1 | 0 | 12.27 | 4 | 0 | 0 | 3.2 | 5 | 5 | 5 | 0 | 4 |
| Mickey Jannis | 0 | 0 | 18.90 | 1 | 0 | 0 | 3.1 | 8 | 7 | 7 | 4 | 1 |
| Manny Barreda | 1 | 0 | 13.50 | 3 | 0 | 0 | 2.2 | 4 | 4 | 4 | 2 | 2 |
| Jay Flaa | 0 | 0 | 0.00 | 1 | 0 | 0 | 1.1 | 0 | 0 | 0 | 2 | 1 |
| Pat Valaika | 0 | 0 | 0.00 | 2 | 0 | 0 | 1.1 | 0 | 0 | 0 | 0 | 0 |
| Stevie Wilkerson | 0 | 0 | 9.00 | 1 | 0 | 0 | 1.0 | 2 | 1 | 1 | 0 | 0 |
| Zack Burdi | 0 | 0 | 0.00 | 1 | 0 | 0 | 1.0 | 0 | 0 | 0 | 1 | 1 |
| Brandon Waddell | 0 | 0 | 0.00 | 1 | 0 | 0 | 1.0 | 0 | 0 | 0 | 1 | 0 |
| Austin Wynns | 0 | 0 | 9.00 | 1 | 0 | 0 | 1.0 | 1 | 1 | 1 | 0 | 0 |
| Team totals | 52 | 110 | 5.84 | 162 | 162 | 26 | 1402.0 | 1518 | 956 | 910 | 563 | 1234 |

== Achievements ==
- John Means pitched a complete game no hitter, defeating the Seattle Mariners 6–0 on May 5.

== Farm system ==
| Level | Team | League | Manager |
|---|---|---|---|
| Triple-A | Norfolk Tides | Triple-A East | Gary Kendall |
| Double-A | Bowie Baysox | Double-A Northeast | Buck Britton |
| High-A | Aberdeen IronBirds | High-A East | Kyle Moore |
| Low-A | Delmarva Shorebirds | Low-A East | Dave Anderson |
| Rookie | FCL Orioles Orange | Florida Complex League | Kevin Bradshaw |
| Rookie | FCL Orioles Black | Florida Complex League | Alan Mills |
| Foreign Rookie | DSL Orioles 1 | Dominican Summer League | Elvis Morel |
| Foreign Rookie | DSL Orioles 2 | Dominican Summer League | Chris Madera |
