= Luis Sardiñas =

Venezuelan baseball player (born 1993)

Senadores de Caracas – No. 17
- Infielder
- Born: May 16, 1993 (age 33); Upata, Venezuela
- Batted: Switch Threw: Right

MLB debut
- April 20, 2014, for the Texas Rangers

Last MLB appearance
- April 28, 2018, for the Baltimore Orioles

MLB statistics
- Batting average: .224
- Home runs: 5
- Runs batted in: 32
- Stats at Baseball Reference

Teams
- Texas Rangers (2014); Milwaukee Brewers (2015); Seattle Mariners (2016); San Diego Padres (2016–2017); Baltimore Orioles (2018)

Luis Alexander Sardiñas Avilez (born May 16, 1993) is a Venezuelan professional baseball infielder for the Senadores de Caracas of the Venezuelan Major League. Sardiñas signed with the Texas Rangers as an amateur free agent in 2009. He made his Major League Baseball (MLB) debut with the Rangers during the 2014 season, and has also played in MLB for the Milwaukee Brewers, Seattle Mariners, San Diego Padres, and Baltimore Orioles.

== Career ==
=== Texas Rangers ===
Sardiñas signed with the Texas Rangers as an amateur free agent in 2009. He started the 2013 season with the Myrtle Beach Pelicans of the High–A Carolina League and was promoted to the Frisco RoughRiders of the Double–A Texas League during the season.

Sardiñas was ranked by MLB.com as the 84th best prospect in baseball before the 2013 season. He was considered the Rangers second best prospect by MLB.com during the 2013-14 offseason.

The Rangers promoted Sardiñas to the major leagues on April 19, 2014. He made his major league debut the next day. He collected his first Major League hit off of Andre Rienzo.

=== Milwaukee Brewers ===
On January 19, 2015, the Rangers traded Sardiñas, Corey Knebel, and Marcos Diplan to the Milwaukee Brewers for starting pitcher Yovani Gallardo. He batted .196/.240/.216 in 36 games for the Brewers in 2015, while also playing for the Colorado Springs Sky Sox of the Triple–A Pacific Coast League (PCL).

=== Seattle Mariners ===
On November 20, 2015, the Brewers traded Sardiñas to the Seattle Mariners for Ramón Flores. Sardiñas hit his first major league home run on April 5, 2016, off of reliever Andrew Faulkner of the Rangers. He batted .181/.203/.264 in 72 at bats for the Mariners during the 2016 season, while also playing for the Tacoma Rainiers of the PCL.

=== San Diego Padres ===
On August 15, 2016, the Mariners traded Sardiñas to the San Diego Padres in return for a player to be named later or cash considerations. He batted .287 for the Padres for the remainder of the 2016 season, and competed to become the Padres' starting shortstop in 2017. He did not win the starting shortstop role, but made the team as a reserve. He batted .163/.226/.163 in 2017 before the Padres designated him for assignment on May 21.

=== Baltimore Orioles ===
On May 24, 2017, the Baltimore Orioles claimed Sardiñas off of waivers. Two days later, he was removed from the 40–man roster and sent outright to the Norfolk Tides of the Triple–A International League. Sardiñas finished the year with Norfolk, playing in 83 games and hitting .319 with five home runs and 30 RBI.

After beginning 2018 with Norfolk, Sardiñas was selected to the major league roster on April 17, 2018. He went 2–for–18 (.111) in eight games before being placed on the injured list with a back injury. Upon being activated on July 6, Sardiñas was again removed from the roster and outrighted to Triple–A Norfolk. He elected free agency on October 2.

=== Washington Nationals ===
On January 22, 2019, Sardiñas signed a minor league contract with the Washington Nationals. He split the year between the Double–A Harrisburg Senators and Triple–A Fresno Grizzlies, playing in 82 games and hitting .234 with one home run and 21 RBI. Sardiñas became a free agent following the 2019 season, but later re-signed with the team on a minor league deal in the offseason. After the 2019 season, he played for Caribes de Anzoátegui of the Liga Venezolana de Béisbol Profesional (LVMP).

Sardiñas did not play in a game for the organization in 2020 due to the cancellation of the minor league season because of the COVID-19 pandemic. On May 29, 2020, Sardiñas was released by Nationals. After the 2020 season, he again played for the Caribes of the LVMP.

=== Mariachis de Guadalajara ===
On February 15, 2021, Sardiñas signed with the Mariachis de Guadalajara of the Mexican League. In 51 games for the team, he batted .332/.376/.550 with 9 home runs, 40 RBI, and 13 stolen bases.

=== Algodoneros de Unión Laguna ===
On August 1, 2022, Sardiñas was traded to the Algodoneros de Unión Laguna. He played in only four games for the club to finish the year. In 2023, Sardiñas played in 45 games for Unión Laguna, batting .318/.389/.459 with four home runs and 39 RBI.

=== Leones de Yucatán ===
On July 11, 2023, Sardiñas was traded to the Leones de Yucatán. In 23 games for Yucatán, he batted .290/.389/.398 with 2 home runs and 10 RBI.

=== Charros de Jalisco ===
On February 12, 2024, Sardiñas was traded to the Charros de Jalisco. In 62 games for Jalisco, Sardiñas hit .282/.333/.496 with 11 home runs, 41 RBI, and 8 stolen bases.

=== Guerreros de Oaxaca ===
On July 2, 2024, Sardiñas was traded to the Guerreros de Oaxaca of the Mexican League. In 12 games for Oaxaca, he batted .333/.440/.429 with one home run and 11 RBI. Sardiñas was released by the Guerreros on July 17.

=== Tecolotes de los Dos Laredos ===
On July 22, 2024, Sardiñas signed with the Tecolotes de los Dos Laredos of the Mexican League. In nine games for Dos Laredos, he slashed .229/.429/.657 with two home runs and four RBI.

=== Conspiradores de Querétaro ===
On November 13, 2024, Sardiñas was traded to the Conspiradores de Querétaro of the Mexican League. In 12 appearances for Querétaro, he batted .220/.396/.390 with two home runs and eight RBI. Sardiñas was released by the Conspiradores on May 17, 2025.

=== Olmecas de Tabasco ===
On May 30, 2025, Sardiñas signed with the Olmecas de Tabasco of the Mexican League. In 27 games he hit .250/.310/.317 with 1 home run and 12 RBIs. He was released on July 11.

== See also ==
- List of Major League Baseball players from Venezuela
