= Mac Sceroler =

American baseball player (born 1995)

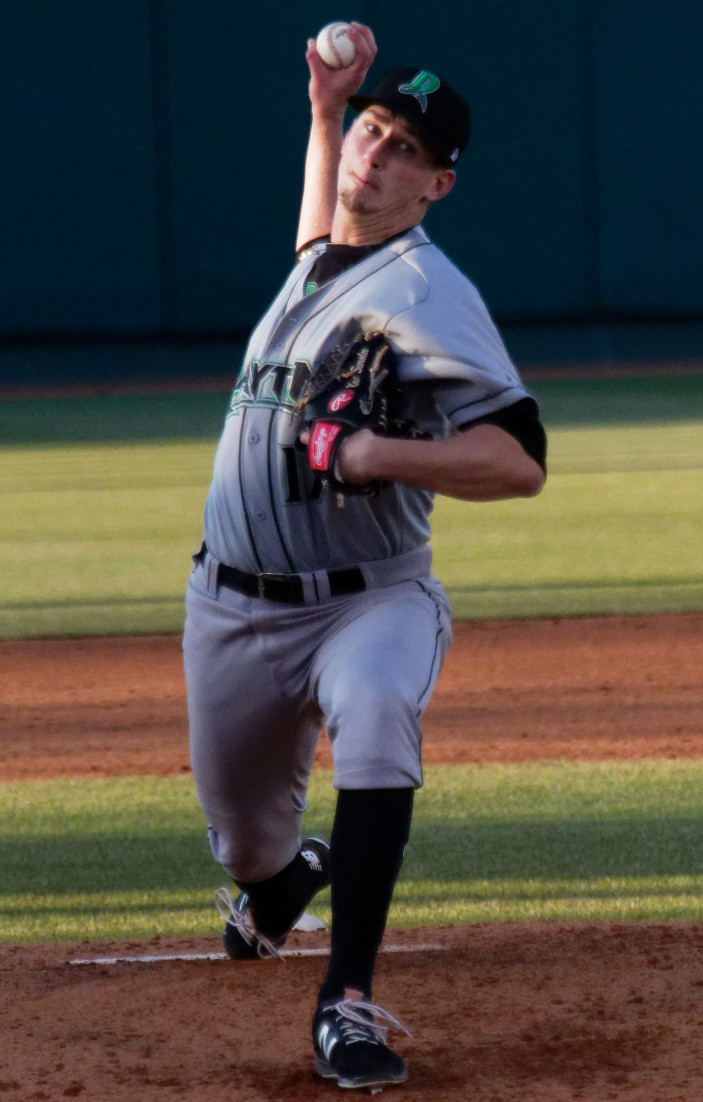
- Sceroler with the Dayton Dragons in 2018
- Pitcher
- Born: April 9, 1995 (age 31); Baton Rouge, Louisiana, U.S.
- Batted: Right Threw: Right

MLB debut
- April 5, 2021, for the Baltimore Orioles

Last MLB appearance
- June 21, 2021, for the Baltimore Orioles

MLB statistics
- Win–loss record: 0–0
- Earned run average: 14.09
- Strikeouts: 11
- Stats at Baseball Reference

Teams
- Baltimore Orioles (2021)

Joseph McDonald Sceroler (/sʌˈroʊlər/ suh-ROHL-er; born April 9, 1995) is an American former professional baseball pitcher. He played in Major League Baseball (MLB) for the Baltimore Orioles in 2021.

== Career ==
=== Amateur ===
Sceroler attended Denham Springs High School in Denham Springs, Louisiana, and Southeastern Louisiana University, where he played college baseball for the Southeastern Louisiana Lions. In 2016, he played collegiate summer baseball for the Hyannis Harbor Hawks of the Cape Cod Baseball League. The Philadelphia Phillies selected Sceroler as a draft-eligible sophomore in the 36th round of the 2016 MLB draft, but he opted not to sign so that he could return to Southeastern Louisiana for his junior year.

=== Cincinnati Reds ===
The Cincinnati Reds selected Sceroler in the fifth round, 137th overall, of the 2017 MLB draft, and he signed with the Reds. He made his professional debut with the rookie-level Billings Mustangs in 2017, posting a 3.26 ERA in 12 games. Sceroler opened the 2018 season with the Single-A Dayton Dragons, but missed time due to a strained oblique muscle, ultimately finishing the year with a 4–8 record and 4.97 ERA between Billings and Dayton. In 2019, he pitched for the High-A Daytona Tortugas, logging a 5–4 record and 3.69 ERA with 127 strikeouts in 117.0 innings of work. Sceroler did not play in a game in 2020 due to the cancellation of the minor league season because of the COVID-19 pandemic.

=== Baltimore Orioles ===
The Baltimore Orioles selected Sceroler from the Reds in the 2020 Rule 5 draft. He made the Orioles' Opening Day roster. On April 5, 2021, Sceroler made his MLB debut, relieving Paul Fry to face Aaron Judge with the bases loaded in a game against the New York Yankees, whom he struck out on 6 pitches. In his debut he threw 2 2/3 innings, recording 4 strikeouts. Sceroler struggled to a 14.09 ERA in 5 appearances before being designated for assignment on June 22.

=== Cincinnati Reds (second stint) ===
On June 26, 2021, Sceroler was returned to the Cincinnati Reds organization and assigned to the Double-A Chattanooga Lookouts. In 10 appearances for Chattanooga, he struggled to a 1–4 record and 8.42 ERA with 38 strikeouts in 36 1/3 innings pitched.

Sceroler suffered a rotator cuff tear prior to the 2022 season, and missed the entire year after undergoing surgery to repair a SLAP (Superior Labrum, Anterior to Posterior) tear.

Sceroler was assigned to Double–A Chattanooga to begin the 2023 season. He ultimately split the season between the rookie–level Arizona Complex League Reds, Dayton, and Chattanooga, posting a cumulative 5.89 ERA and 22 strikeouts across 11 games. Sceroler elected free agency following the season on November 6.

== Personal life ==
Two of Sceroler's uncles, Ben McDonald and Brett Laxton, played in Major League Baseball.

== See also ==
- Rule 5 draft results
