= Yovani Gallardo =

Mexican baseball player (born 1986)

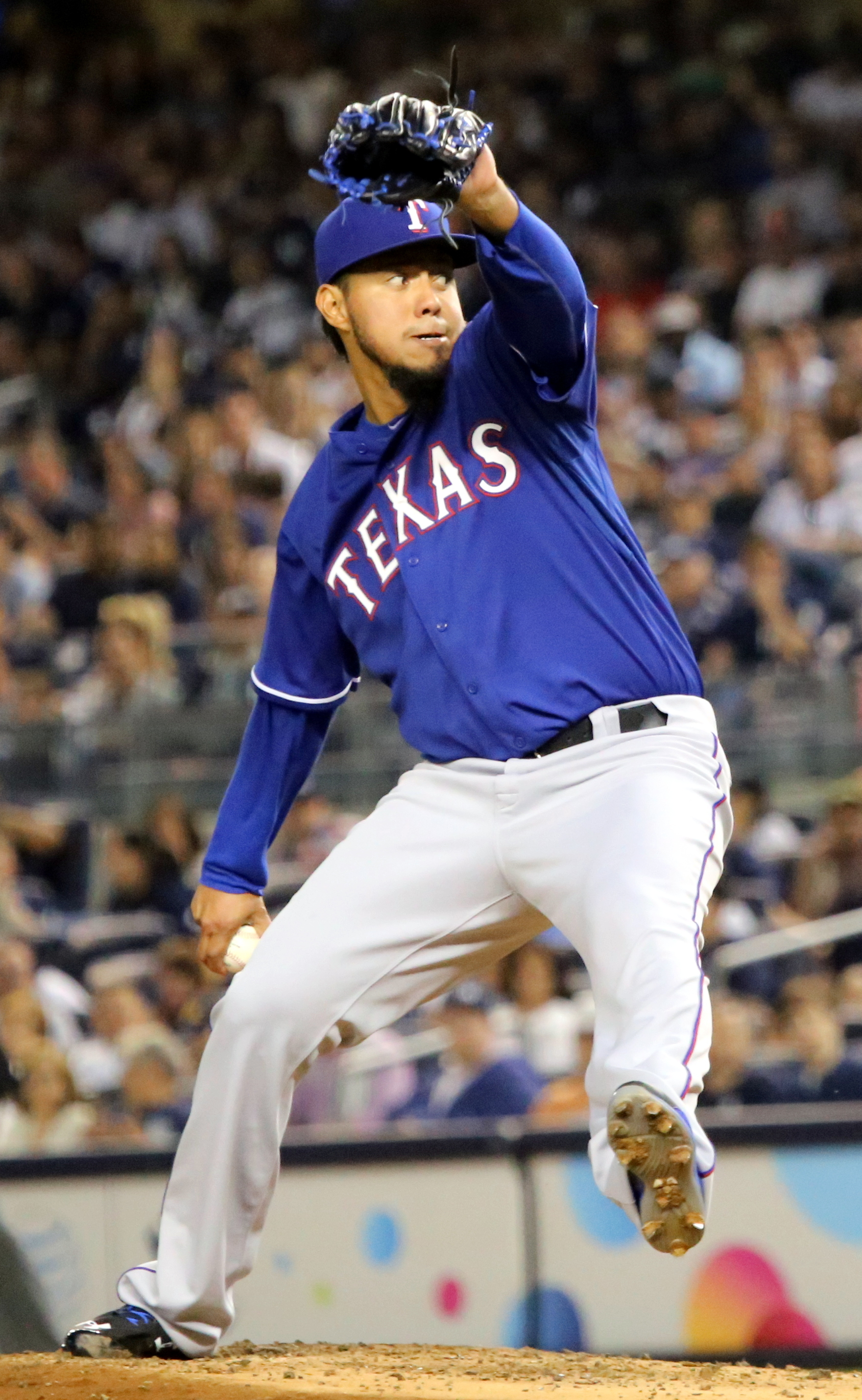
- Gallardo with the Texas Rangers in 2015
- Pitcher
- Born: February 27, 1986 (age 40); Penjamillo, Michoacán, Mexico
- Batted: Right Threw: Right

MLB debut
- June 18, 2007, for the Milwaukee Brewers

Last MLB appearance
- September 30, 2018, for the Texas Rangers

MLB statistics
- Win–loss record: 121–101
- Earned run average: 4.06
- Strikeouts: 1,584
- Stats at Baseball Reference

Teams
- Milwaukee Brewers (2007–2014); Texas Rangers (2015); Baltimore Orioles (2016); Seattle Mariners (2017); Cincinnati Reds (2018); Texas Rangers (2018)

Career highlights and awards
- All-Star (2010); Silver Slugger Award (2010); Milwaukee Brewers Wall of Honor

Member of the Mexican Professional

Baseball Hall of Fame
- Induction: 2024

Yovani Gallardo (yo-VAH-nee guy-ARE-doh; born February 27, 1986) is a Mexican former professional baseball pitcher. He was selected by the Milwaukee Brewers in the second round of the 2004 Major League Baseball draft out of Trimble Technical High School in Fort Worth, Texas. He played in Major League Baseball (MLB) for the Milwaukee Brewers, Baltimore Orioles, Texas Rangers, Seattle Mariners, and Cincinnati Reds. Gallardo was an All-Star in 2010, and won the Silver Slugger Award for pitchers that year.

== Career ==
Gallardo attended Green B. Trimble Technical High School in Fort Worth, Texas. He committed to attend Texas Christian University (TCU) on a college baseball scholarship to play for the TCU Horned Frogs. The Milwaukee Brewers selected Gallardo in the second round of the 2004 Major League Baseball draft. Gallardo signed with the Brewers, rather than enroll at TCU.

=== Milwaukee Brewers ===
==== 2006 season ====
With Brevard County Manatees of the Class A-Advanced Florida State League, Gallardo had a no-hitter for 8 1/3 innings before surrendering a triple on June 9; Gallardo finished the game with 11 strikeouts. Splitting time between Brevard County and the Huntsville Stars of the Class AA Southern League, he led all minor league pitchers with 188 strikeouts in 155 innings of work, the most in a single season by a Milwaukee Brewers prospect. His Double-A line included 13 starts and a 1.63 earned run average (ERA).

==== 2007 season ====
Gallardo started the season with the Nashville Sounds of the Class AAA Pacific Coast League. On June 14, the Milwaukee Brewers announced the call-up of Gallardo to replace starter Chris Capuano, who was placed on the disabled list with a strained left groin. Gallardo made his major league debut against the San Francisco Giants on June 18, yielding 3 earned runs in 6 1/3 innings for the win, with three walks and four strikeouts. In Gallardo's first at-bat in the majors, he hit an RBI double.

For his second career start on June 24, Gallardo had a no-hitter into the 5th inning. He would later take the no-decision when the bullpen blew the lead in the 8th. After coming out of the bullpen for three games, Gallardo was inserted back into the starting rotation on July 17 when then-Brewers ace Ben Sheets went on the 15-day disabled list with a right distal finger sprain.

==== 2008 season ====
Gallardo started the season on the disabled list. He went on the 15-day DL on March 21, 2008, with a torn lateral meniscus in his left knee. Upon his return on April 20, Gallardo pitched well during the next three games, compiling a 1.80 ERA in twenty innings of work.

During his start on May 1, Gallardo jumped to get out of the way of a diving Chicago Cubs player – Reed Johnson – and landed awkwardly, bending his right knee extensively, during the 5th inning. He continued to pitch through the 6th, but was later diagnosed with a torn anterior cruciate ligament (ACL). Gallardo was placed on the 15-day disabled list, and was not activated until September 24.

Gallardo was the starting pitcher in game 1 of the NLDS on October 1, 2008, against the Philadelphia Phillies. He ended up taking the loss to Cole Hamels.

==== 2009 season ====
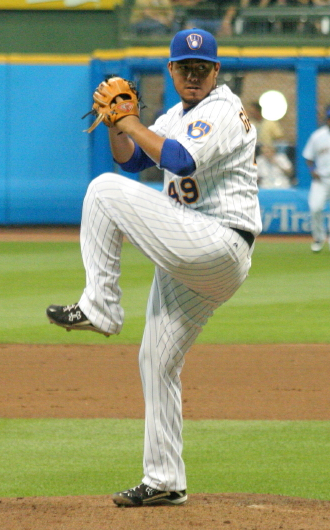
Gallardo pitching for the Milwaukee Brewers in 2009

During Spring training for 2009, Gallardo was offered to pitch for Mexico in the World Baseball Classic, but turned it down to focus on getting ready for the 2009 season. A few baseball commentators, notably Eric Karabell of ESPN, believed that Gallardo would be the Brewers' ace for the coming season.

His first start was on April 8 against the Giants, lasting 6 2/3 innings, giving up only 2 runs and striking-out 6 en route to getting the win. He made news in the 6th inning when he hit a three-run home run off of Randy Johnson. He was the only pitcher to ever hit a home run off of Johnson.

Gallardo pitched his first career complete game on April 24 against the Houston Astros. Gallardo allowed only two runs on five hits, striking out seven. His family was in attendance for the game, and were moved to behind the Brewers dugout for the final inning.

Gallardo made baseball news again in his next start against the Pittsburgh Pirates. Gallardo pitched 8 shutout innings and hit a home run in the 7th, which was the only run of the game. Gallardo became only the 26th pitcher in major league history to win a game 1–0 while hitting a home run, and joined Red Ruffing and Early Wynn as the only ones to do so while striking out 10 or more batters (Gallardo struck out 11, also a career high). Gallardo tossed a 2-hitter on Memorial Day against the St. Louis Cardinals. He struck out 6 batters, one of them Albert Pujols. He struck out 9 on May 31 against the Cincinnati Reds. Gallardo pitched another 2-hitter on June 5, shutting out the Atlanta Braves 4–0. He struck out six Braves in the victory.

Gallardo struggled with his stamina in the final two months of the season, and was finally benched for the remainder of the year in mid-September. Gallardo started 30 games for the Brewers, with a record of 13–12 with a 3.73 ERA. He struck out 204 batters over 185 innings pitched, becoming only the 4th Brewer pitcher to strike out 200+ batters.

==== 2010 season ====
On April 7, the Brewers signed Gallardo to a five-year, $30.1 million contract extension through the 2014 season, with an $13 million option for 2015. Gallardo pitched his first career complete-game shutout on May 28 at Miller Park against the New York Mets, outdueling Mets ace Johan Santana 2–0. Gallardo was selected to his first All-Star game in the 2010 season, but just after he was elected, he got injured.

On August 27, 2010, Gallardo was robbed at gunpoint at a Milwaukee supermarket. He and clubhouse attendant Alex Sanchez handed over jewelry and money to the robbers. Sanchez was struck on the head with the butt of the gun.

Gallardo had a solid 2010 season, going 14–7 with a 3.84 ERA and 200 strikeouts in 185 innings pitched, plus two complete-game shutouts. Gallardo also was stellar at the plate, batting .254 with 4 home runs, 10 RBIs, and a .504 slugging percentage. Gallardo was awarded the National League Silver Slugger award as the best hitting pitcher.

==== 2011 season ====
Gallardo was named the opening day starter for the second straight year after a rib injury placed Zack Greinke on the DL. On April 5, his second start of the season, Gallardo recorded his third complete-game shutout in his career. The opposing Atlanta Braves were only able to record two hits and two walks. Gallardo also recorded a hit and scored the only run of the game.

On April 23, he hit his ninth home run of his career off of the Astros' Nelson Figueroa as the Brewers won 14–7. On May 7, Gallardo pitched a no-hitter into the 8th inning against the St. Louis Cardinals, but it was ended by a lead-off single by Daniel Descalso in the 8th that just slipped past a diving Craig Counsell. It turned out to be the only hit of the game for St. Louis as Gallardo finished the 8th inning by retiring the next 3 batters and Brewers closer John Axford closed out the 9th inning in a 4–0 Brewers win. Gallardo walked 4 batters and struck out 6 in the game.

On his August 21 start against the New York Mets, Gallardo earned his 14th win of the season, matching his career high. The win was also his 50th career win in the majors.

On September 17, Gallardo set a new career high in strikeouts with 13 against the Cincinnati Reds, including 4 in one inning, with Brandon Phillips reaching on a wild 3rd strike. Gallardo became the second Brewer ever to strike out 4 batters in one inning, with Manny Parra being the other. Gallardo also won his 17th game of the season, the most by a Brewer since Chris Capuano won 18 games in 2005.

On September 23, in his final regular season start, Gallardo struck out 11 Marlins. It was the third straight start in which Gallardo struck out at least 11 batters, and it ensured him another 200 strikeout season, his third in a row. As a result of this game, he became the first Brewers pitcher to notch 3 straight double digit strikeout starts, as well as 3 straight 200+ strikeout seasons. The only other pitchers to have three seasons of at least 200 strikeouts at 25 or younger over the previous 20 years were Kerry Wood (1998, 2001 and 2002) and Félix Hernández (2009, 2010 and 2011).

Gallardo finished with a 17–10 record for the season with a 3.52 ERA, and 207 strikeouts (fifth in the league) in 207.1 innings pitched. His 17 wins were fourth in the NL.

In Game 1 of the NLDS against the Arizona Diamondbacks, Gallardo pitched 8 innings, only surrendering 4 hits and a walk, and one earned run on a solo home run by Ryan Roberts. His nine strikeouts tied a franchise record for most strikeouts in a postseason game for the Brewers. Gallardo earned a win as the Brewers went on to win 4–1. Gallardo started game 5 of the NLDS, lasting 6 innings. Control was a problem for him throughout the game, bouncing multiple pitches in front of home. He threw 66 strikes in a 112-pitch, 6-inning effort. Gallardo didn't receive the decision, surrendering 1 earned run as the Brewers went on to win 3–2 in 10 innings.

Gallardo finished in 7th place in Cy Young voting, the first time Gallardo had ever received votes for the award.

==== 2012 season ====
On July 15, Gallardo achieved a new career high, striking out 14 Pittsburgh Pirates, the most strikeouts in a game for a Brewer since Ben Sheets struck out 18 Atlanta Braves in 2004. Gallardo had another solid season in 2012, going 16–9 with a 3.66 ERA, and 204 strikeouts in 204 innings pitched. Gallardo also led the National League with 33 games started.

==== 2013 season ====
Gallardo pitched for Mexico in the World Baseball Classic, pitching once against the United States. Gallardo pitched 3 1/3 innings, giving up one run and striking out 4.

Gallardo struggled through the beginning of the 2013 season, losing 4 games in a row at one point, and was on the disabled list in early August before rebounding to go 4–1 to close the season.

Gallardo had the worst season of his career in 2013, going 12–10 with a 4.18 ERA. For the first time in a full season, Gallardo failed to reach 200 strikeouts, striking out only 144 batters in almost 181 innings pitched.

==== 2014 season ====
On May 27, Gallardo achieved the rare feat of getting a walk-off hit after pinch-hitting against T.J. McFarland of the Baltimore Orioles in the bottom of the 10th inning. After McFarland intentionally walked Mark Reynolds, Gallardo hit an RBI double, resulting in a 7–6 victory for the Brewers. Gallardo finished the season with a losing record for the first time in his MLB career (an 8-11 record in 32 starts despite posting a 3.51 ERA with 146 strikeouts in 192.1 innings pitched). Gallardo's losing record was mostly due to weak run support he received throughout the season (2.97 average run support).

=== Texas Rangers ===
On January 19, 2015, Gallardo was traded to the Texas Rangers in exchange for Corey Knebel, Luis Sardiñas and Marcos Diplan. Gallardo finished his first regular season with the Rangers posting a 13-11 record in 33 starts while posting a respectable 3.42 ERA in 184.1 innings pitched. Gallardo pitched for the Rangers in Game 1 of the 2015 ALDS against the Toronto Blue Jays, earning the win. He became a free agent following the season.

=== Baltimore Orioles ===
On February 25, 2016, Gallardo signed a two-year, $22 million contract with the Baltimore Orioles, with a team option for a third year. In his lone season with the Orioles, Gallardo turned in his worst season of his career. He finished the year with a 6–8 record, 5.42 ERA, and 85 strikeouts in 118 innings.

=== Seattle Mariners ===
On January 6, 2017, Gallardo was traded along with cash to the Seattle Mariners in exchange for Seth Smith. After struggling through the first half of the season for Seattle, Gallardo was moved to the bullpen on June 22. He was reinstated to the starting rotation in August due to his strong performance as a reliever and injuries to other Seattle starters. However, due to several poor appearances and new pitching acquisitions, he was relegated to the bullpen once more.

In 2017, he was 5–10, with a 5.72 ERA. He had his option declined on November 2 and became a free agent.

=== Milwaukee Brewers (second stint) ===
On December 21, 2017, Gallardo signed a one-year, $2 million contract with the Milwaukee Brewers. The Brewers released him on March 26, 2018.

=== Cincinnati Reds ===
On March 31, 2018, Gallardo signed a one-year contract with the Cincinnati Reds. He was designated for assignment on April 10, and elected free agency on April 12.

=== Texas Rangers (second stint) ===
On April 13, 2018, Yovani Gallardo signed a minor-league contract with the Texas Rangers. He was called up on June 17 to replace Doug Fister in the rotation. He elected free agency on October 29.

== Scouting report ==
Gallardo had a five-pitch repertoire consisting of a four-seam fastball, a curveball, a slider, a changeup, and a cutter. His fastball was generally clocked between 92 and 95 mph, occasionally reaching as high as 96, the curve was thrown hard in the upper 70s to lower 80s, and the slider was usually in the mid-80s and had a late sharp break. When he was in the minors, his curveball was considered the best curveball in the minor leagues. He somewhat phased out his changeup in the later years of his career. He then began to throw a cutter in the upper 80s to supplement his changeup.

== Personal life ==
Gallardo is married. The couple has three children, including one pair of twins. They reside in Fort Worth, Texas.

== See also ==
- List of Major League Baseball single-inning strikeout leaders
