= Corey Knebel =

American baseball player (born 1991)

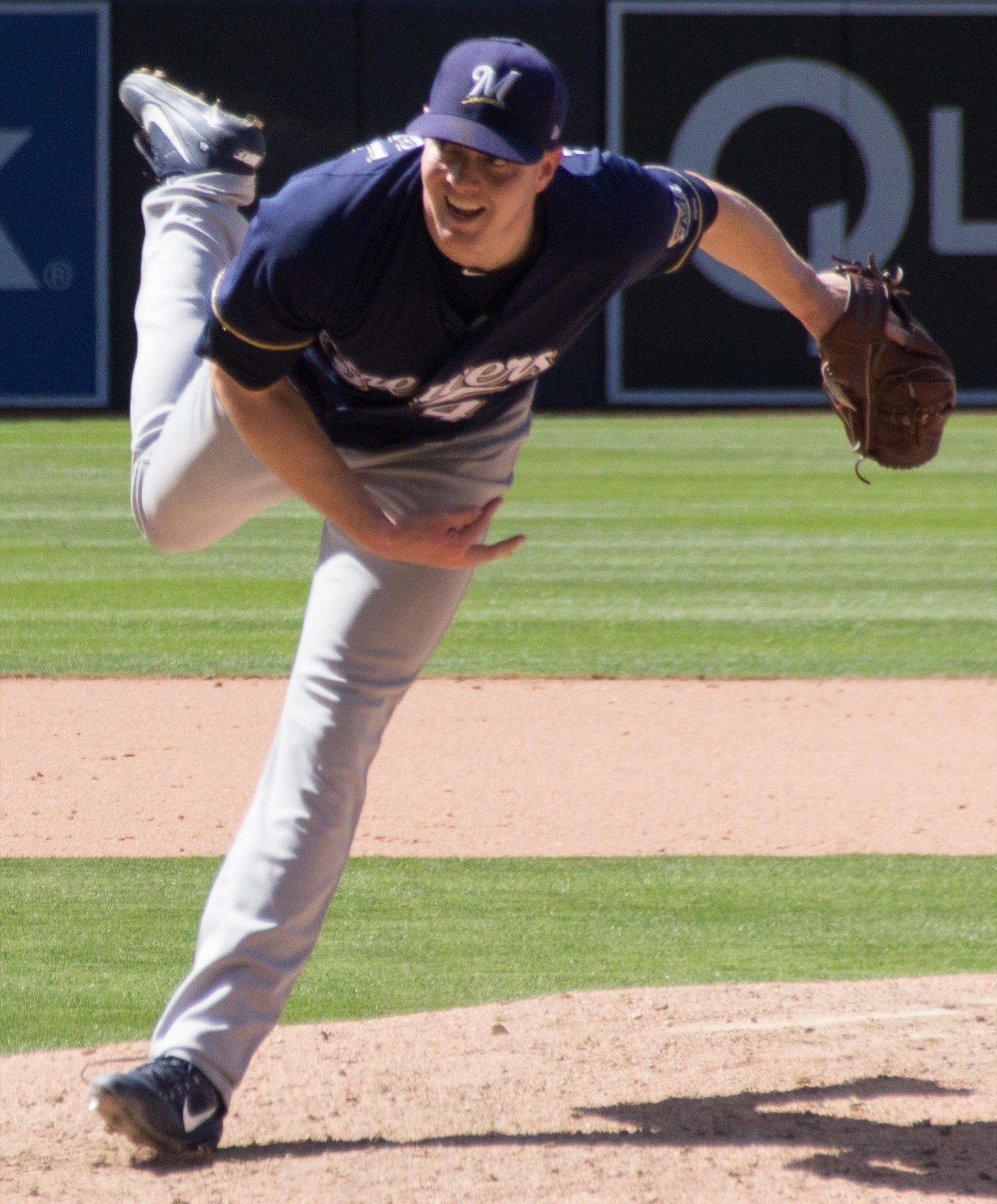
- Knebel with the Milwaukee Brewers in 2017
- Pitcher
- Born: November 26, 1991 (age 34); Denton, Texas, U.S.
- Batted: Right Threw: Right

MLB debut
- May 24, 2014, for the Detroit Tigers

Last MLB appearance
- August 14, 2022, for the Philadelphia Phillies

MLB statistics
- Win–loss record: 13–16
- Earned run average: 3.26
- Strikeouts: 407
- Saves: 72
- Stats at Baseball Reference

Teams
- Detroit Tigers (2014); Milwaukee Brewers (2015–2018, 2020); Los Angeles Dodgers (2021); Philadelphia Phillies (2022)

Career highlights and awards
- All-Star (2017); MLB records: 45 consecutive games with a strikeout by a relief pitcher

Corey Andrew Knebel (born November 26, 1991) is an American former professional baseball pitcher. He played in Major League Baseball (MLB) for the Detroit Tigers, Milwaukee Brewers, Los Angeles Dodgers, and Philadelphia Phillies.

== Early life ==
Knebel was born in Denton, Texas to parents Jeffrey and Melissa Knebel and grew up in Bastrop County, Texas. He attended Bastrop High School, where he was a three-year letter winner and a former district MVP in baseball. He was also a member of the school's basketball team. He is a graduate of Georgetown High School, where he moved for his senior season.

== College career ==
Knebel enrolled at the University of Texas in 2011, and played college baseball for the Texas Longhorns baseball team. He became the Longhorn's closer as a freshman and tied J. Brent Cox and Charlie Thames' school records for saves in a single season with 19. He was named the NCBWA Stopper of the Year and the Freshman of the Year by the NBCWA and Collegiate Baseball Magazine. Knebel earned First Team All-American and first-team All-Big 12 Conference honors.

Knebel was again the Longhorn closer in 2012, finishing the year with nine saves and a 2.08 earned run average. Though unable to match the accolades of his freshman season, he again earned first-team All-Big 12 honors.

Knebel was suspended from the Longhorns twice in 2013, once for violating team rules and once for providing a urine sample to help a teammate beat a drug test.

== Professional career ==
=== Detroit Tigers ===
Knebel was drafted by the Detroit Tigers as the 39th pick in the 2013 Major League Baseball draft. This supplemental pick was the first traded draft slot in Major League history. The pick was included in a 2012 trade between the Tigers and the Miami Marlins, which included Aníbal Sánchez, Omar Infante, and Jacob Turner. Knebel played for the Class-A West Michigan Whitecaps, the Double-A Erie SeaWolves and the Triple-A Toledo Mud Hens before being called up by the Tigers. He made his major league debut on May 24, 2014, against the Texas Rangers.

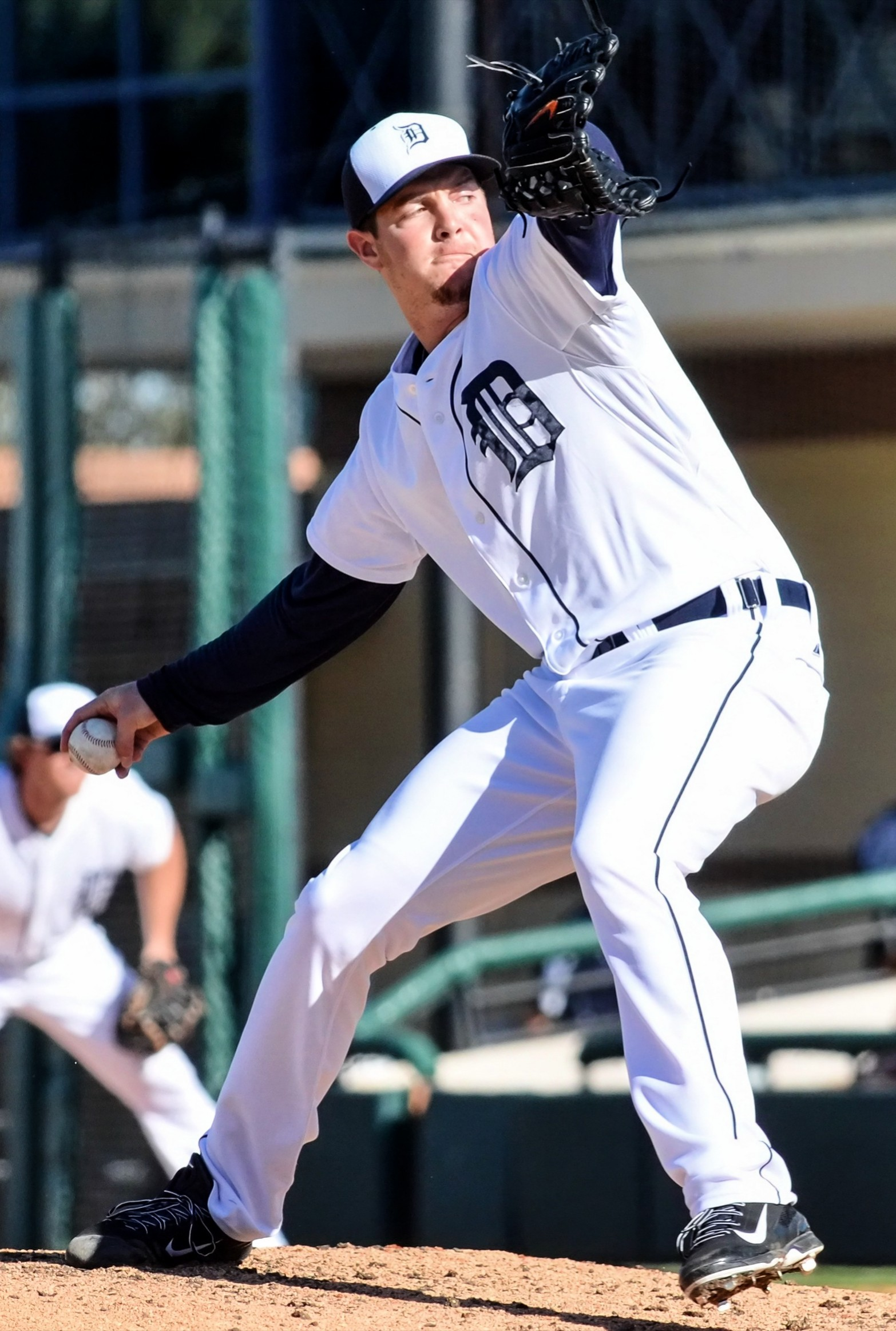
Knebel pitching for the Detroit Tigers in 2014 spring training

=== Texas Rangers ===
On July 23, 2014, the Tigers traded Knebel and Jake Thompson to the Texas Rangers, in exchange for reliever Joakim Soria. After the trade, Knebel was assigned to play for the Rangers' Triple-A team, the Round Rock Express. Knebel sprained the ulnar collateral ligament of the elbow in his throwing arm in August, ending his season.

=== Milwaukee Brewers ===
On January 19, 2015, the Rangers traded Knebel, Luis Sardiñas, and Marcos Diplan to the Milwaukee Brewers for Yovani Gallardo.

In May 2017, Knebel became the permanent closer for the Brewers, taking the job from a struggling Neftalí Feliz. On June 22, Knebel set the MLB record for most consecutive appearances with at least one strikeout by a relief pitcher at 38. The record was previously set in 2014 by Aroldis Chapman with the Cincinnati Reds. On July 19, Knebel's streak ended at 45 games after failing to record a strikeout in a blown save against the Pittsburgh Pirates.

Knebel injured his left hamstring while pitching on April 5, 2018, against the Chicago Cubs and was placed on the disabled list. He was activated on May 9. However, Knebel struggled over his next 3 months with the Brewers, and he was demoted to the Colorado Springs Sky Sox on August 24 after compiling a 2–3 record with a 5.08 ERA in 41 appearances. He was brought back up on September 2, and closed out the regular season in dominant fashion with 16 consecutive scoreless appearances, including 2 wins, 2 saves, and 6 holds. In the 2018 postseason he posted a 0.90 ERA in 10 innings, giving up his lone run in a save of NLCS Game 1.

Shortly after 2019 opening day, Knebel was dealing with soreness in his right elbow. It was eventually revealed that he had a torn UCL, which necessitated Tommy John surgery and sidelined Knebel for the entire 2019 season. On December 2, Knebel was designated for assignment by the Brewers.

In the shortened 2020 season, Knebel returned and recorded a 6.08 ERA in 13 1/3 innings over 15 games.

=== Los Angeles Dodgers ===
On December 2, 2020, the Brewers traded Knebel to the Los Angeles Dodgers in exchange for Leo Crawford.

On May 2, 2021, Knebel was placed on the 60-day injured list with a right lat strain, an injury that kept him sidelined until August 10. As a result of the injury he only appeared in 27 games for the Dodgers in 2021, including four appearances as an opener, and finished with a 4–0 record, 2.45 ERA, three saves and 30 strikeouts. In the postseason, he appeared in seven games (including two as an opener), pitching 5 2/3 innings and allowing two runs on five hits and one walk while striking out 11.

=== Philadelphia Phillies ===
On December 1, 2021, Knebel signed a one-year contract with the Philadelphia Phillies. In 2022, Knebel made 46 appearances for the Phillies, registering a 3–5 record and 3.43 ERA with 41 strikeouts and 12 saves in 44 2/3 innings pitched. On August 21, 2022, Knebel was placed on the 60–day injured list with a torn shoulder capsule, and missed the remainder of the season. He became a free agent following the season.

=== Chicago White Sox ===
On February 13, 2024, Knebel signed a minor league contract with the Chicago White Sox. In 12 appearances split between the rookie–level Arizona Complex League White Sox, High–A Winston-Salem Dash, and Triple–A Charlotte Knights, he accumulated a 5.91 ERA with 12 strikeouts across 10 2/3 innings pitched. Knebel was released by the White Sox organization on August 1.

=== Los Angeles Angels ===
On August 13, 2024, Knebel signed a minor league contract with the Los Angeles Angels. In 6 appearances for the Triple–A Salt Lake Bees, he struggled to a 25.07 ERA with 6 strikeouts over 4 2/3 innings pitched. Knebel asked for his release from the Angels organization on September 8.

== Retirement ==
On September 11, 2024, Knebel officially announced his retirement from Major League Baseball.

== Personal life ==
Knebel married longtime girlfriend Danielle Matula on December 5, 2015, in Victoria, Texas. The couple have four daughters (Ledger, Halstyn, Kollyns, and Rivy) and reside in Austin, Texas.
