= Beau Sulser =

American baseball player (born 1994)

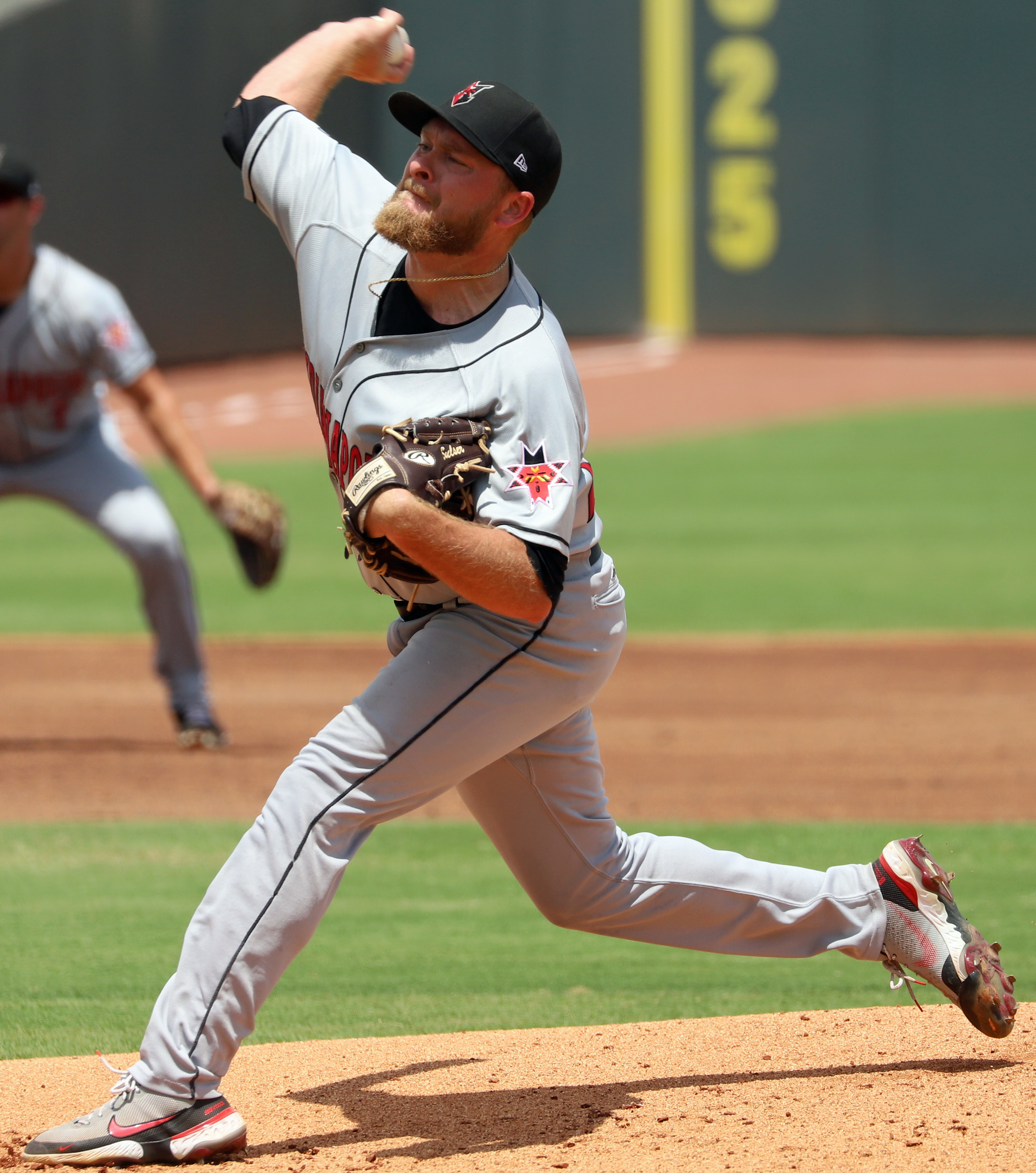
- Sulser with the Indianapolis Indians in 2021
- Pitcher
- Born: May 5, 1994 (age 31); Escondido, California, U.S.
- Batted: Right Threw: Right

Professional debut
- MLB: April 26, 2022, for the Pittsburgh Pirates
- KBO: April 11, 2023, for the KT Wiz
- CPBL: April 5, 2025, for the Rakuten Monkeys

Last appearance
- MLB: October 5, 2022, for the Baltimore Orioles
- KBO: May 28, 2023, for the KT Wiz
- CPBL: October 3, 2025, for the Rakuten Monkeys

MLB statistics
- Win–loss record: 0–0
- Earned run average: 3.63
- Strikeouts: 19

KBO statistics
- Win–loss record: 1–7
- Earned run average: 5.62
- Strikeouts: 35

CPBL statistics
- Win–loss record: 6–7
- Earned run average: 3.89
- Strikeouts: 62
- Stats at Baseball Reference

Teams
- Pittsburgh Pirates (2022); Baltimore Orioles (2022); KT Wiz (2023); Rakuten Monkeys (2025)

Career highlights and awards
- Taiwan Series champion (2025)

Beau Grayson Sulser (born May 5, 1994) is an American former professional baseball pitcher. He played in Major League Baseball (MLB) for the Pittsburgh Pirates and Baltimore Orioles, in the KBO League for the KT Wiz, and in the Chinese Professional Baseball League (CPBL) for the Rakuten Monkeys.

== Playing career ==
=== Amateur career ===
Sulser attended Ramona High School in Ramona, California. He enrolled at Dartmouth College, where he played college baseball for the Dartmouth Big Green from 2013 to 2017. In 2017, he was named the Ivy League's pitcher of the year.

=== Pittsburgh Pirates ===
The Pittsburgh Pirates drafted Sulser in the tenth round, with the 298th overall selection, of the 2017 Major League Baseball draft. He made his professional debut with the Low–A West Virginia Black Bears. In 2018, Sulser returned to West Virginia, now the Single–A Power, and registered a 5–8 record and 2.35 ERA with 63 strikeouts and 8 saves.

Sulser spent the 2019 campaign with the Double–A Altoona Curve, compiling an 8–3 record and 2.72 ERA with 63 strikeouts across 96 innings pitched. He did not play in a game in 2020 due to the cancellation of the minor league season because of the COVID-19 pandemic. Sulser spent 2021 with the Triple–A Indianapolis Indians, accumulating a 7–9 record and 5.65 ERA with 102 strikeouts over 122 2/3 innings of work.

On April 24, 2022, the Pirates promoted Sulser to the major leagues. He made his major league debut on April 26. Sulser appeared in four games for Pittsburgh, allowing four runs in 9 2/3 innings. He was designated for assignment on May 12.

=== Baltimore Orioles ===
Sulser was claimed off waivers by the Baltimore Orioles on May 14, 2022. He allowed five runs and 16 hits in 12 2/3 innings over six relief appearances. On October 14, Sulser was designated for assignment following the waiver claims of Aramis Garcia and Mark Kolozsvary. On October 18, the Pittsburgh Pirates claimed Sulser off of waivers; they outrighted him to the minor leagues on November 10.

=== KT Wiz ===
On November 23, 2022, Sulser signed a one-year, $740,000 contract with the KT Wiz of the KBO League. Sulser made 9 starts for the Wiz in 2023, struggling to a 1–7 record and 5.62 ERA with 35 strikeouts in 49 2/3 innings pitched. He was removed from the active roster on May 29, and released by the team on June 9, after William Cuevas was signed.

=== Pittsburgh Pirates (second stint) ===
On June 29, 2023, Sulser signed a minor league contract with the Pittsburgh Pirates organization. In 12 games (7 starts) split between the Triple–A Indianapolis Indians and Double–A Altoona Curve, he accumulated a 6.13 ERA with 28 strikeouts across 39 2/3 innings. Sulser elected free agency following the season on November 6.

=== Toronto Blue Jays ===
On May 4, 2024, Sulser signed a minor league contract with the Toronto Blue Jays. In 17 games (8 starts) for the Triple–A Buffalo Bisons, he posted a 3–7 record and 5.29 ERA with 37 strikeouts across 47 2/3 innings pitched. Sulser was released by the Blue Jays organization on August 6.

=== Pittsburgh Pirates (third stint) ===
On August 15, 2024, Sulser signed a minor league contract with the Pittsburgh Pirates. He spent the remainder of the year with the Triple-A Indianapolis Indians, also making one appearance for the Double-A Altoona Curve. In 6 games (3 starts) for Indianapolis, Sulser posted a 1-1 record and 6.53 ERA with 22 strikeouts across 20 2/3 innings pitched. He elected free agency following the season on November 4.

=== Rakuten Monkeys ===
On January 21, 2025, Sulser signed with the Rakuten Monkeys of the Chinese Professional Baseball League. In 16 appearances (15 starts) for the team, he logged a 6-7 record and 3.89 ERA with 62 strikeouts across 83 1/3 innings pitched. With the Monkeys, Sulser won the 2025 Taiwan Series. He became a free agent following the season.

== Coaching career ==
On February 8, 2026, Sulser was hired by the Tampa Bay Rays in a player development role.

== Personal life ==
His brother, Cole, is also a professional baseball player.
