= Marcos Diplán =

Dominican baseball player (born 1996)

- Pitcher
- Born: September 18, 1996 (age 29); Santiago de los Caballeros, Dominican Republic
- Batted: Right Threw: Right

MLB debut
- August 6, 2021, for the Baltimore Orioles

Last MLB appearance
- May 31, 2022, for the Baltimore Orioles

MLB statistics
- Win–loss record: 2–0
- Earned run average: 4.04
- Strikeouts: 32
- Stats at Baseball Reference

Teams
- Baltimore Orioles (2021–2022)

Marcos Antonio Diplán Guzmán (born September 18, 1996) is a Dominican former professional baseball pitcher. He has previously played in Major League Baseball (MLB) for the Baltimore Orioles.

== Career ==
=== Texas Rangers ===
The Texas Rangers signed Diplan as an international free agent in 2013, receiving a $1.3m signing bonus. He pitched for the Dominican Rangers during the 2014 season, where he had a 7–2 win–loss record, a 1.54 ERA, and 57 strikeouts in 64 1/3 innings pitched.

=== Milwaukee Brewers ===
On January 19, 2015, the Rangers traded Diplan, Luis Sardiñas, and Corey Knebel to the Milwaukee Brewers for Yovani Gallardo. He spent 2015 with the Helena Brewers where he was 2–2 with a 3.75 ERA in 50.1 innings pitched, and 2016 with the Brevard County Manatees and Wisconsin Timber Rattlers where he posted a combined 7–4 record, 3.02 ERA, and 1.29 WHIP in 27 total games (17 starts) between the two clubs. In 2017, he pitched for the Carolina Mudcats where he compiled a 7–8 record and 5.23 ERA in 26 games (22 starts).

The Brewers added him to their 40-man roster after the 2017 season. He spent the 2018 season with both Carolina and the Biloxi Shuckers, pitching to a combined 5–8 record with a 4.03 ERA in 25 games (24 starts). He returned to Biloxi to begin 2019.

Diplán was designated for assignment on July 29, 2019, following the acquisition of Jordan Lyles.

=== Minnesota Twins ===
The Brewers traded Diplán to the Minnesota Twins for cash considerations on July 31, 2019. Between Biloxi and the Pensacola Blue Wahoos, Diplan went 3–5 with a 4.85 ERA in 68 2/3 innings in 2019. On September 14, 2019, the Twins designated Diplán for assignment. Diplán was claimed by the Detroit Tigers on September 16.

=== Baltimore Orioles ===
On December 9, 2019, the Baltimore Orioles claimed Diplán off waivers. He was designated for assignment on December 29, following the signing of Kohl Stewart. He was outrighted to the minor leagues on January 9, 2020. Diplán did not play in a game in 2020 due to the cancellation of the minor league season because of the COVID-19 pandemic. On October 29, 2020, Diplan was re-signed to a minor league contract. Diplán began the 2021 season with the Norfolk Tides. In June 2021, he was selected to play in the All-Star Futures Game.

The Orioles promoted Diplán to the major leagues on August 4, 2021. He made his MLB debut on August 6 and struck out Tampa Bay Rays first baseman Ji-man Choi looking for his first career strikeout. Diplán made 23 appearances for the Orioles, going 2–0 with a 4.50 ERA and 24 strikeouts.On November 3, 2021, the Orioles outrighted Diplán to Triple-A Norfolk. However, he rejected the assignment, making him a free agent.

On November 18, 2021, Diplán re-signed with the Orioles on a minor league contract for the 2022 season. He began the 2022 season with Norfolk, and was promoted to the major leagues on April 17. He was designated for assignment on July 6, 2022, and was sent to Triple-A Norfolk. On August 6, 2022, Diplán was released by the Orioles.

=== Acereros de Monclova ===
On June 10, 2023, Diplán signed with the Acereros de Monclova of the Mexican League. In 3 appearances, Diplán posted a 0–2 record with an 11.74 ERA and 6 strikeouts in 7.2 innings. He was waived on June 24.

=== Rieleros de Aguascalientes ===
On July 11, 2023, Diplán signed with the Rieleros de Aguascalientes of the Mexican League. He made one start for the team, surrendering 3 runs on 2 hits and 4 walks with 1 strikeout in two-thirds of an inning. Diplán was released by the team on July 13.

== International career ==
In the Final Olympics Qualifying Tournament he was a part of the Dominican Republic team, with whom he qualified for the Olympic Games.
