= Manny Barreda =

Mexican-American baseball player (born 1988)

Charros de Jalisco – No. 50
- Pitcher
- Born: October 8, 1988 (age 37); Prescott, Arizona, U.S.
- Bats: Right Throws: Right

Professional debut
- MLB: September 8, 2021, for the Baltimore Orioles
- CPBL: September 5, 2025, for the Wei Chuan Dragons

MLB statistics (through 2021 season)
- Win–loss record: 1–0
- Earned run average: 13.50
- Strikeouts: 2

CPBL statistics (through 2025 season)
- Win–loss record: 2-2
- Earned run average: 3.57
- Strikeouts: 11
- Stats at Baseball Reference

Teams
- Baltimore Orioles (2021); Wei Chuan Dragons (2025)
Medals
Men's baseball
Representing Mexico
World Baseball Classic
Bronze medal – third place	2023 Miami	Team
2019 WBSC Premier12
Bronze medal – third place	2019 Tokyo	National team

Manuel Antonio Barreda (born October 8, 1988) is a Mexican-American professional baseball pitcher for the Charros de Jalisco of the Mexican League. He has previously played in Major League Baseball (MLB) for the Baltimore Orioles and in the Chinese Professional Baseball League (CPBL) for the Wei Chuan Dragons. Barreda was drafted by the New York Yankees in the 12th round of the 2007 MLB draft.

== Career ==
=== New York Yankees ===
Barreda was drafted by the New York Yankees in the 12th round, 394th overall, of the 2007 Major League Baseball draft. He made his professional debut with the rookie-level Gulf Coast League Yankees, recording a 5–0 record and 3.00 ERA in 11 appearances. In 2008, Barreda recorded a 2.65 ERA in 6 games with the team.

Barreda split the 2009 season between the Single-A Charleston RiverDogs and the GCL Yankees, posting a 3.12 ERA in 16 appearances between the two teams. The following year, he split the season between the Low-A Staten Island Yankees and Charleston, recording a cumulative 3.33 ERA in 13 appearances. In 2011, Barreda played in 45 games for Charleston, pitching to a 4–3 record and 4.50 ERA with 82 strikeouts in 74.0 innings of work. For the 2012 season, Barreda played in High-A with the Tampa Yankees, registering a 5–3 record and 3.95 ERA with 60 strikeouts in 57.0 innings pitched. In 2013, Barreda split the year between Tampa and the Double-A Trenton Thunder, logging a 2–3 record and 4.02 ERA in 38 appearances. In 2014, Barreda recorded a 4–1 record and 3.40 ERA in 30 games before he was released by the organization on July 15, 2014.

=== Milwaukee Brewers ===
On July 17, 2014, Barreda signed a minor league deal with the Milwaukee Brewers organization. He finished the year with the Double-A Huntsville Stars, pitching to a 1.99 ERA in 17 games. On March 30, 2015, Barreda was released by the Brewers in Spring Training to pursue playing in the Mexican League.

=== Toros de Tijuana ===
On April 14, 2015, Barreda signed with the Toros de Tijuana of the Mexican League. Barreda only pitched in 3 games before being suspended by LMP for a controversial contract dispute with another team. He was released so he could sign back with the Milwaukee Brewers.

=== Milwaukee Brewers (second stint) ===
On May 20, 2015, Barreda re-signed with the Milwaukee Brewers organization on a new minor league contract. He split the remainder of the year between the High-A Brevard County Manatees and the Double-A Biloxi Shuckers, recording a cumulative 3.10 ERA with 54 strikeouts in 49.1 innings of work. On November 6, 2015, he elected free agency.

=== Toros de Tijuana (second stint) ===
On March 25, 2016, Barreda signed with the Toros de Tijuana of the Mexican League for the 2016 season. He made 25 appearances for the Toros, posting a 2–1 record and 3.50 ERA.

=== Atlanta Braves ===
On December 22, 2016, Barreda signed a minor league contract with the Atlanta Braves organization. Before the minor league season began, Barreda was loaned to the Toros de Tijuana of the Mexican League. He recorded a 4–7 record and 4.06 ERA in 18 games for Tijuana before being released on August 3 and re-joining the Braves organization the next day. He appeared in 7 games for the Triple-A Gwinnett Braves in 2017, posting a 3–1 record and 1.83 ERA with 33 strikeouts in 39.0 innings pitched.

=== Toros de Tijuana (third stint) ===
On March 27, 2018, Barreda was again loaned to the Toros for the 2018 season. He spent the year with Tijuana, posting a 4–1 record and 41 strikeouts in 17 games. On November 2, 2018, he elected free agency and re-signed with the Toros. For the 2019 season, Barreda pitched in 23 games for Tijuana, posting an 8–3 record and 4.40 ERA. Barreda did not play in a game in 2020 due to the cancellation of the Mexican League season because of the COVID-19 pandemic.

=== Baltimore Orioles ===
On March 4, 2021, Barreda signed a minor league contract with the Baltimore Orioles organization. He was assigned to the Triple-A Norfolk Tides to begin the season. On September 7, Barreda was selected to the 40-man roster and promoted to the major leagues for the first time. Barreda made his MLB debut the next day at 32 years of age, and earned his first career win after pitching a shutout 8th inning against the Kansas City Royals. Barreda posted a 13.50 ERA in 3 appearances for Baltimore before he was designated for assignment on September 21 following the waiver claim of Joey Krehbiel. Barreda was assigned outright to Norfolk the following day. He was granted free agency on November 7.

=== Toros de Tijuana (fourth stint) ===
On March 17, 2022, Barreda signed with the Toros de Tijuana of the Mexican League. In 17 starts, he posted a 7–3 record with a 4.28 ERA and 102 strikeouts over 88 1/3 innings. He returned to the Toros in 2023, going 6–5 with a 5.28 ERA and 99 strikeouts across 92 innings pitched. In 2024, Barreda struggled to a 2–4 record with a 7.14 ERA and 39 strikeouts in 46 1/3 innings.

On July 5, 2024, Barreda was traded to El Águila de Veracruz of the Mexican League. He did not appear for Veracruz before he was traded back to Tijuana on September 19.

=== Saraperos de Saltillo ===
On March 18, 2025, Barreda was traded to the Saraperos de Saltillo of the Mexican League. Barreda made 19 appearances (18 starts) for Saltillo, compiling a 7-4 record and 6.22 ERA with 74 strikeouts across 98 1/3 innings pitched.

=== Wei Chuan Dragons ===
On August 26, 2025, Barreda signed with the Wei Chuan Dragons of the Chinese Professional Baseball League. In six appearances, he posted a 2-2 record with a 3.57 ERA, 11 strikeouts, and eight walks across 17 2/3 innings pitched. Barreda became a free agent following the season.

=== Saraperos de Saltillo (second stint) ===
On April 14, 2026, Barreda signed with the Saraperos de Saltillo of the Mexican League. In eight starts for Saltillo, he posted an 0–3 record with a 7.20 ERA, 26 strikeouts, and 20 walks across 35 innings pitched.

=== Charros de Jalisco ===
On June 8, 2026, Barreda and Alex Mejia were traded to the Charros de Jalisco of the Mexican League in exchange for Luis Payán and Donny Sands.

== International career ==
Barreda was selected to the Mexico national baseball team at the 2020 Summer Olympics (contested in 2021).

In 2023, Barreda was part of the 2023 México World Baseball Team that was defeated by Japan in the semifinals.

In 2026, Barreda was called up to represent Team Mexico at the 2026 World Baseball Classic, replacing Taj Bradley on the roster.
