= Paul Fry (baseball) =

American baseball player (born 1992)

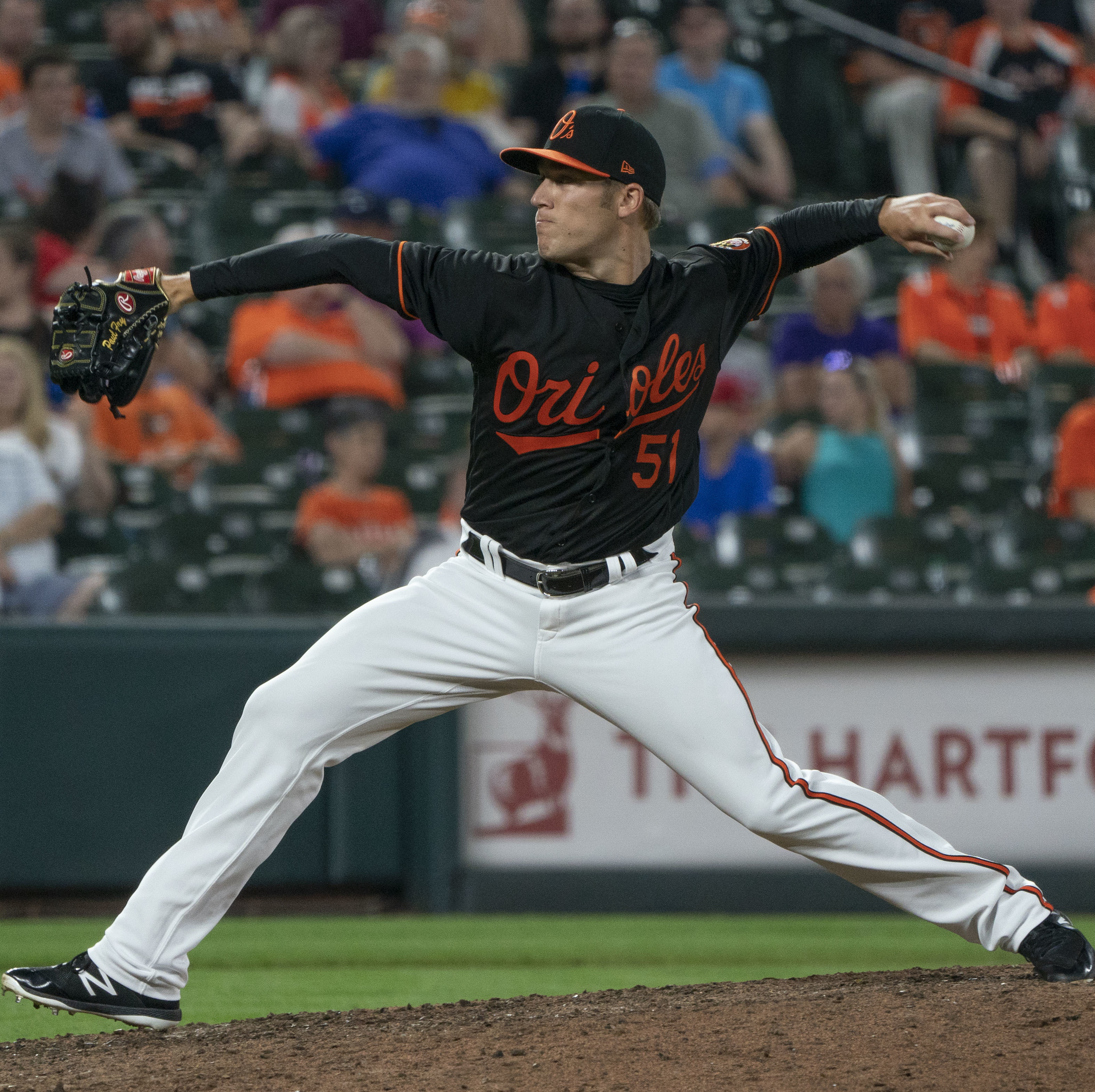
- Fry with the Baltimore Orioles in 2018

Free agent
- Pitcher
- Born: July 26, 1992 (age 33); Pontiac, Michigan, U.S.
- Bats: Left Throws: Left

MLB debut
- June 29, 2018, for the Baltimore Orioles

MLB statistics (through 2022 season)
- Win–loss record: 7–16
- Earned run average: 4.82
- Strikeouts: 194
- Stats at Baseball Reference

Teams
- Baltimore Orioles (2018–2022); Arizona Diamondbacks (2022)

Paul Raymond Fry (born July 26, 1992) is an American professional baseball pitcher who is a free agent. He has previously played in Major League Baseball (MLB) for the Baltimore Orioles and Arizona Diamondbacks.

== Amateur career ==
After graduating from Waterford Kettering High School in Waterford, Michigan, Fry enrolled at St. Clair County Community College. In 2013, his sophomore year, he went 6–1 with a 1.80 ERA with 97 strikeouts in 55 innings.

== Professional career ==
=== Seattle Mariners ===
After the season, Fry was drafted by the Seattle Mariners in the 17th round of the 2013 Major League Baseball draft. He signed and spent 2013 with the Arizona League Mariners where he was 2–3 with a 4.50 ERA in 34 innings pitched. He pitched for the Single-A Clinton LumberKings in 2014, posting a 4–4 record and 2.71 ERA in 28 relief appearances. Fry split the 2015 season between the High-A Bakersfield Blaze and Double-A Jackson Generals, going 4–5 with a 2.03 ERA and 1.15 WHIP in 80 innings pitched. After the 2015 season he played in the Arizona Fall League.

Fry was invited to Spring Training by the Mariners in 2016. He spent the year with the Triple-A Tacoma Rainiers where he compiled a 3–1 record and 2.78 ERA in 48 games (47 relief appearances). On November 18, 2016, the Mariners added Fry to their 40-man roster to protect him from the Rule 5 draft. Fry was assigned to Tacoma to begin the 2017 season and allowed four runs in two innings of work in his only appearance.

On April 11, 2017, Fry was designated for assignment by Seattle following the promotion of Mike Freeman.

=== Baltimore Orioles ===
On April 14, 2017, Fry was traded to the Baltimore Orioles in exchange for international signing bonus allocations. He was assigned to the Triple-A Norfolk Tides upon his acquisition. On June 4, Fry was outrighted off of the 40-man roster. He split time between the Double-A Bowie Baysox and Norfolk in 2017, and in 60 1/3 total innings pitched between Tacoma, Norfolk, and Bowie, Fry was 3–3 with a 4.33 ERA and 72 strikeouts. Fry was assigned to Norfolk to begin the 2018 season.

On June 29, 2018, Fry was selected to the 40-man roster and promoted to the major leagues for the first time. Fry made his MLB debut the same day, pitching 1 1/3 scoreless innings against the Los Angeles Angels. He finished the season 1–2 with a 3.35 ERA and 2 saves in 35 games. Fry pitched in 66 games for Baltimore in 2019, logging a 5.34 ERA with 55 strikeouts.

In 2020 for the Orioles, Fry pitched to a 2.45 ERA with 29 strikeouts over 22 innings pitched in 22 games. In 2021, despite posting a career best 60 strikeouts in 47 1/3, Fry had 35 walks to go along with a career worst 6.08 ERA.

Fry made 12 appearances for Baltimore in 2022, recording a 6.00 ERA with 12 strikeouts over 12 innings of work. Fry was designated for assignment by the Orioles following the acquisition of Beau Sulser on May 14, 2022.

=== Arizona Diamondbacks ===
On May 18, 2022, Fry was traded to the Arizona Diamondbacks in exchange for minor leaguer Luis Osorio. He made only 1 appearance for the big league club, ceding a run in an inning of work. On August 17, Fry was designated for assignment. He cleared waivers and was sent outright to the Triple-A Reno Aces on August 19, where he spent the majority of the year, recording a 4.40 ERA with 28 strikeouts in 28 2/3 innings pitched across 29 games. Fry elected free agency on October 6.

=== Toronto Blue Jays ===
On January 6, 2023, Fry signed a minor league contract with the Toronto Blue Jays organization. He spent the season with the Triple–A Buffalo Bisons, also appearing in one game for the rookie–level Florida Complex League Blue Jays. Across 47 relief outings for Buffalo, Fry registered a 4.28 ERA with 65 strikeouts and 4 saves across 54 2/3 innings of work. He elected free agency following the season on November 6.

=== San Diego Padres ===
On February 23, 2024, Fry signed a minor league contract with the San Diego Padres. In 51 appearances for the Triple-A El Paso Chihuahuas, he compiled a 4-4 record and 4.76 ERA with 57 strikeouts across 73 2/3 innings pitched. Fry elected free agency following the season on November 4.

=== Sultanes de Monterrey ===
On April 15, 2025, Fry signed with the Sultanes de Monterrey of the Mexican League. He made 50 appearances for the Sultanes, compiling a 5-2 record and 1.79 ERA with 42 strikeouts and three saves across 45 1/3 innings pitched. On April 10, 2026, Fry was released by Monterrey.

== Personal life ==
Fry and his wife, Paige, have one son together and one daughter.
