= Cole Sulser =

American baseball player (born 1990)

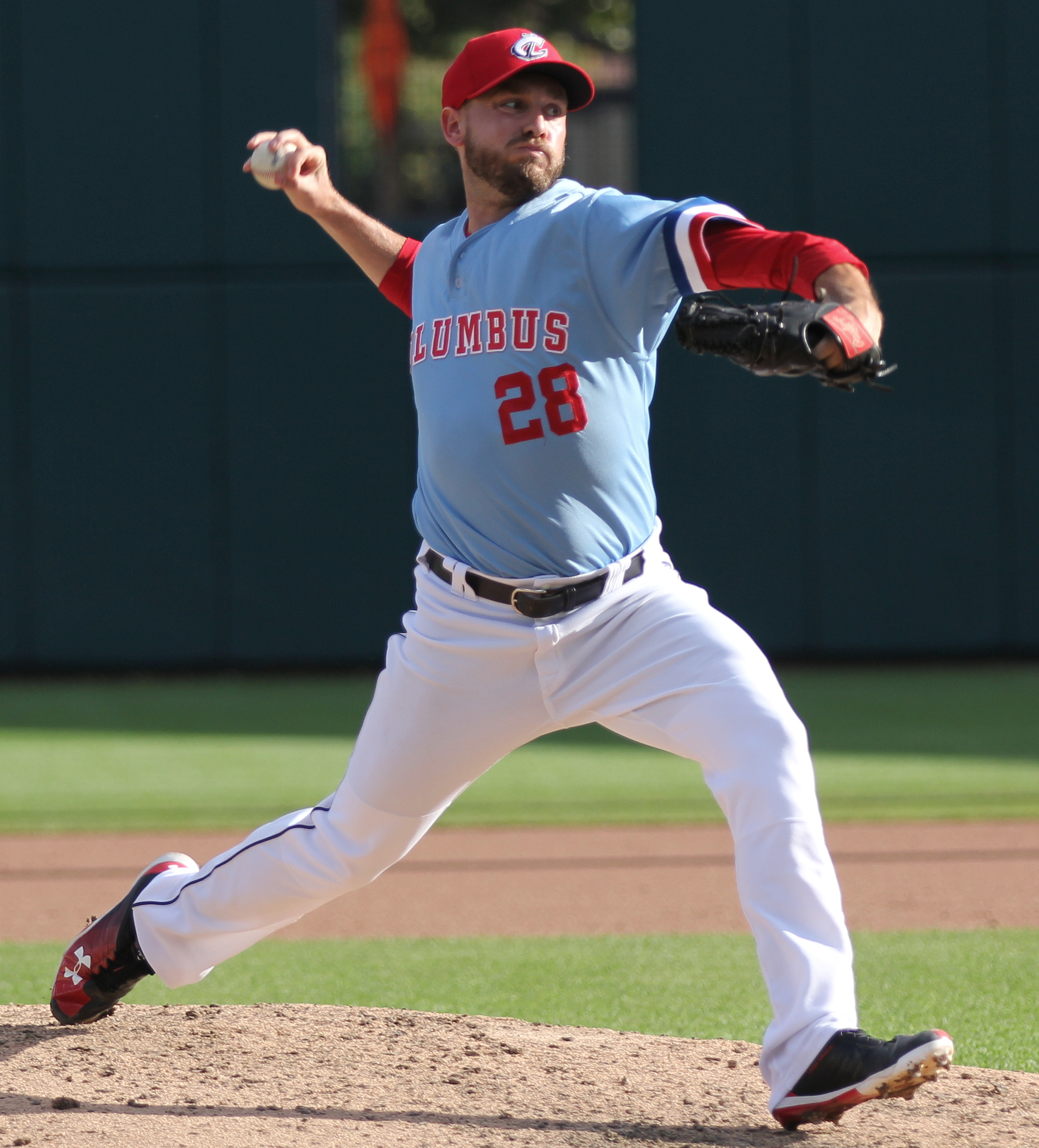
- Sulser with the Columbus Clippers in 2018

Free agent
- Pitcher
- Born: March 12, 1990 (age 36); Santa Ysabel, California, U.S.
- Bats: Right Throws: Right

MLB debut
- September 6, 2019, for the Tampa Bay Rays

MLB statistics (through 2026 season)
- Win–loss record: 11–14
- Earned run average: 3.71
- Strikeouts: 236
- Stats at Baseball Reference

Teams
- Tampa Bay Rays (2019); Baltimore Orioles (2020–2021); Miami Marlins (2022); Arizona Diamondbacks (2023); New York Mets (2024); Tampa Bay Rays (2024–2026)

Cole Young Sulser (born March 12, 1990) is an American professional baseball pitcher who is a free agent. He has previously played in Major League Baseball (MLB) for the Tampa Bay Rays, Baltimore Orioles, Miami Marlins, Arizona Diamondbacks, and New York Mets. He made his MLB debut in 2019 with the Rays.

== Amateur career ==
Sulser graduated from Ramona High School in Ramona, California, in 2008, where he played baseball all four years. Undrafted out of high school, he attended Dartmouth College. He earned two bachelor's degrees at Dartmouth: in public policy and mechanical engineering.

Sulser played college baseball for the Dartmouth Big Green. As a sophomore, Sulser set a Big Green record posting an 8–0 win–loss record, a Big Green single-season record for wins, and led the Ivy League in strikeouts. He was named to the All-Ivy League team in 2011, his junior year, but injured an elbow ligament and underwent Tommy John surgery. Though he missed his entire senior year, his teammates chose him as their captain. Sulser was granted a redshirt for the 2012 season, a rarity in the Ivy League, and he pitched for Dartmouth in 2013, again being named co-captain and making the All-Ivy League team. His 20 wins over his career were the second-most in Dartmouth history.

== Professional career ==
=== Cleveland Indians ===
The Cleveland Indians selected Sulser in the 25th round of the 2013 MLB draft. Sulser played for the Mahoning Valley Scrappers of the Low–A New York-Penn League in 2013, going 3–2 with a 1.83 earned run average (ERA) in 54 innings pitched. He split the 2014 season between the Carolina Mudcats of the High–A Carolina League and the Akron RubberDucks of the Double–A Eastern League, going a combined 4–14 with a 5.43 ERA over 136 innings. Sulser had his second Tommy John surgery in 2015, and missed the entire season.

Sulser split the 2016 season between the Lynchburg Hillcats of the Carolina League, Akron, and the Columbus Clippers of the Triple–A International League, going a combined 2–5 with a 4.34 ERA in 63 innings. Sulser split the 2017 season between Akron and Columbus, going 3–1 with a 2.70 ERA in 63 innings. In winter baseball after the season, Sulser played for the Estrellas Orientales of the Dominican Winter League. In 2018, he again split the season between Akron and Columbus, going 8–4 with a 3.86 ERA in 60 2/3 innings with 95 strikeouts.

=== Tampa Bay Rays ===
On December 13, 2018, Cleveland traded Sulser to the Tampa Bay Rays in a three–team trade in which the Rays also acquired Yandy Díaz for Jake Bauers, and the Seattle Mariners acquired Edwin Encarnación from the Indians for Carlos Santana. Sulser spent the 2019 minor league season with the Durham Bulls of the International League, going 6–3 with a 3.27 ERA in 66 innings with 89 strikeouts.

The Rays selected Sulser's contract and promoted him to the major leagues on September 2, 2019. He made his major league debut with Tampa Bay on September 6 against the Toronto Blue Jays. He was designated for assignment when the Rays activated Yandy Díaz from the 60-day injured list on September 29.

=== Baltimore Orioles ===
Sulser was claimed off waivers by the Baltimore Orioles two days later on October 1, replacing Chandler Shepherd who had been outrighted the previous day. In 2020 for the Orioles, Sulser pitched to a 5.56 ERA with 19 strikeouts and a 1–5 record over 19 appearances. Sulser had a breakout season in 2021 as he went 5–4 with eight saves, a 2.70 ERA and 73 strikeouts in 63 1/3 innings.

=== Miami Marlins ===
On April 3, 2022, the Orioles traded Sulser along with Tanner Scott to the Miami Marlins in exchange for a draft pick, two minor leaguers, Antonio Velez and Kevin Guerrero, and a player to be named later. (On June 3, Baltimore acquired minor league RHP Yaqui Rivera from Miami as the player to be named later).

=== Arizona Diamondbacks ===
On November 8, 2022, Sulser was claimed off waivers by the Arizona Diamondbacks. On November 18, he signed a contract for 2023, avoiding arbitration. On April 9, 2023, Sulser was placed on the 60-day injured list with a right shoulder strain. He was reinstated from the IL on July 30. In 4 games for the Diamondbacks, he allowed 4 runs on 5 hits and 3 walks with 4 strikeouts in 5 1/3 innings pitched. On August 1, Sulser was designated for assignment by Arizona.

=== Tampa Bay Rays (second stint) ===
On August 5, 2023, Sulser was claimed off waivers by the Tampa Bay Rays. In 12 games for the Triple–A Durham Bulls, he posted a 3.86 ERA with 19 strikeouts in 18 2/3 innings pitched. Following the season on November 4, Sulser was removed from the 40–man roster and sent outright to Triple–A Durham. He elected free agency on November 6.

=== New York Mets ===
On November 20, 2023, Sulser signed a minor league contract with the New York Mets organization. On April 8, 2024, after one appearance for the Triple–A Syracuse Mets, Sulser had his contract selected to the major league roster. In four appearances for the Mets, he struggled to a 9.64 ERA with 7 strikeouts over 4 2/3 innings pitched. On July 22, Sulser was designated for assignment by the Mets.

=== Tampa Bay Rays (third stint) ===
On July 26, 2024, the Mets traded Sulser to the Tampa Bay Rays in exchange for cash considerations. He made 6 scoreless appearances for the Rays down the stretch, striking out 8 batters in 11 2/3 innings pitched.

Sulser was optioned to the Triple-A Durham Bulls to begin the 2025 season.

On November 20, 2026, Sulser was non-tendered by the Rays and became a free agent.

== Personal life ==
Sulser grew up in Santa Ysabel, California, located in the San Diego mountains. However he attended elementary, middle and high school in Ramona, where his mother was a teacher. Sulser started playing baseball at age four and played Ramona Pony Baseball until age 14. He also played on several local travel teams. He attended Ramona High School where he played baseball, was ASB President and served as a peer mentor. His father worked as a general building contractor as well as helped coach many of Sulser's youth teams.

His younger brother, Beau Sulser, also plays professional baseball, after a college career at Dartmouth. Sulser's younger sister, Tiffany, serves in the United States Coast Guard. He is married to model and actress, Dana Sulser which he met in 2016 while playing in Double A for the Akron Rubber Ducks with the Cleveland Indians organization. In 2020, the two co wrote and illustrated a children's book called "Benny The Pitcher."
