= Conner Greene =

American baseball player (born 1995)

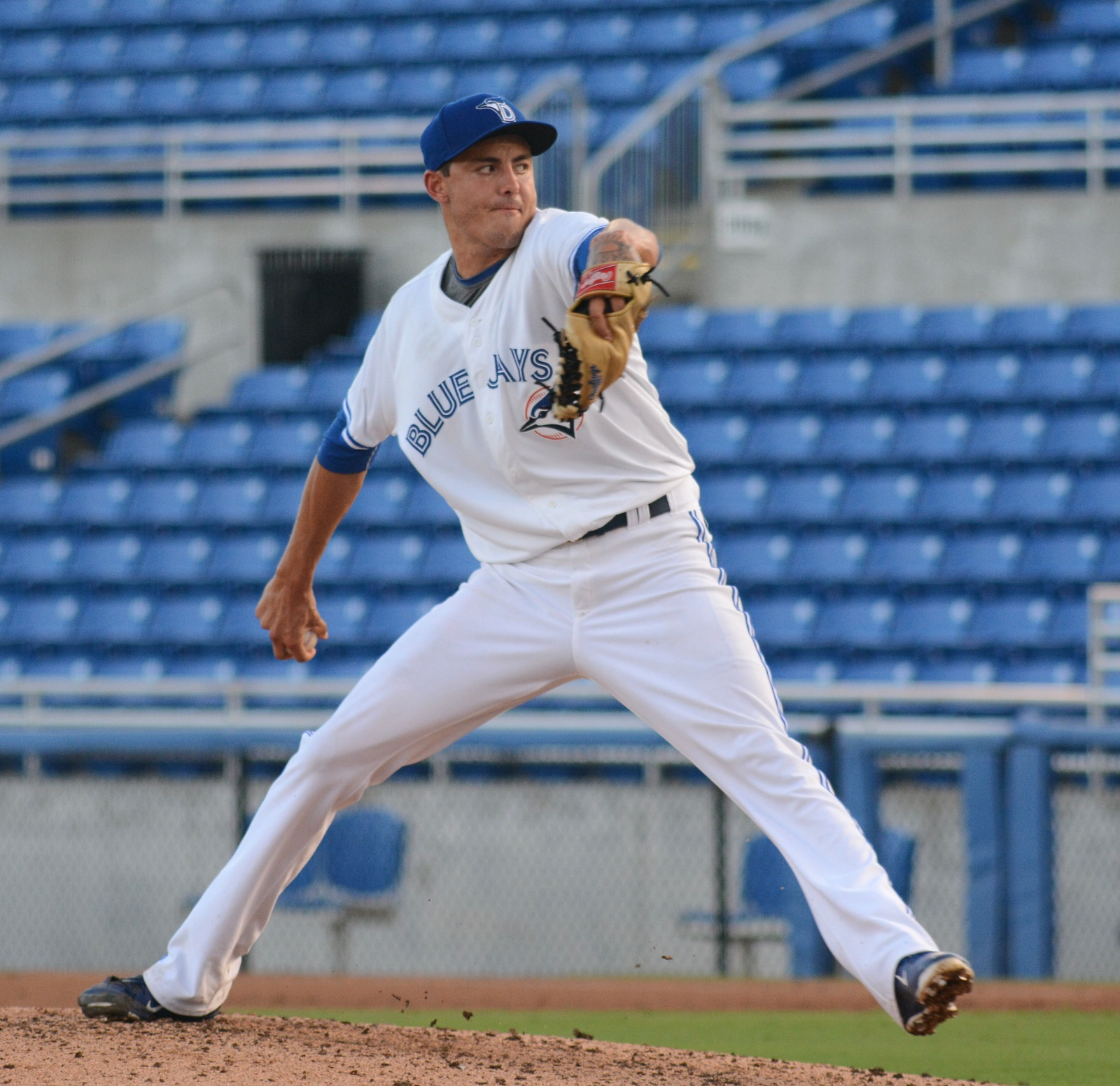
- Greene with the Dunedin Blue Jays in 2015

Guerreros de Oaxaca – No. 29
- Pitcher
- Born: April 4, 1995 (age 31); Santa Monica, California, U.S.
- Bats: Right Throws: Right

MLB debut
- July 27, 2021, for the Baltimore Orioles

MLB statistics (through 2021 season)
- Win–loss record: 1–3
- Earned run average: 7.11
- Strikeouts: 26
- Stats at Baseball Reference

Teams
- Baltimore Orioles (2021); Los Angeles Dodgers (2021); Baltimore Orioles (2021)

James Conner Greene (born April 4, 1995) is an American professional baseball pitcher for the Guerreros de Oaxaca of the Mexican League. He has previously played in Major League Baseball (MLB) for the Baltimore Orioles and Los Angeles Dodgers. Greene was selected by the Toronto Blue Jays in the seventh round of the 2013 MLB draft.

== Professional career ==
=== Toronto Blue Jays ===
Greene attended Santa Monica High School, where he posted a 1.63 earned run average (ERA) and 76 strikeouts in his senior year. Greene was selected by the Toronto Blue Jays in the seventh round (205th overall) of the 2013 Major League Baseball draft. He had committed to play baseball at the College of Southern Nevada but instead signed with Toronto for $100,000.

Greene made his professional debut in 2013 with the rookie-level Gulf Coast League Blue Jays, posting a 1–1 record with a 5.28 ERA and 20 strikeouts over 30 2/3 innings. In 2014, he split the season between the GCL Blue Jays and the rookie-level Bluefield Blue Jays, finishing with a 3–4 record, 3.03 ERA, and 51 strikeouts over 59 1/3 innings.

In 2015, Greene began the season with the Single-A Lansing Lugnuts, posting a 7–3 record with a 3.88 ERA and 65 strikeouts over 67 1/3 innings before being promoted to the High-A Dunedin Blue Jays. He made his debut for Dunedin on July 4, 2015, taking the loss after allowing four runs on nine hits. On August 6, Greene recorded a career-high 10 strikeouts over seven shutout innings. He was later promoted to the Double-A New Hampshire Fisher Cats and earned a win in his debut on August 13, pitching six shutout innings. Greene made 26 total starts split between the three affiliates, finishing with a 12–7 record, 3.54 ERA, and 115 strikeouts over 132 1/3 innings.

Greene received an invitation to Major League spring training in 2016 before being reassigned to minor league camp on March 10. He opened the season with Dunedin before being promoted to Double-A New Hampshire in July. On July 26, Greene threw his first career complete game shutout, defeating the Harrisburg Senators 1–0. He finished the season with a 10–9 record, 3.51 ERA, and 99 strikeouts over 146 1/3 innings. He later appeared in the Arizona Fall League.

Greene spent the 2017 season with New Hampshire, going 5–10 with a 5.29 ERA and 92 strikeouts over 132 2/3 innings. On November 20, 2017, the Blue Jays added Greene to their 40-man roster in order to protect him from the Rule 5 draft.

=== St. Louis Cardinals ===
On January 19, 2018, Greene was traded to the St. Louis Cardinals in exchange for Randal Grichuk. He split the 2018 season between the Double-A Springfield Cardinals and Triple-A Memphis Redbirds, recording a combined 4–5 record with a 4.09 ERA over 40 appearances (10 starts). Greene was designated for assignment by the Cardinals on November 20.

=== Kansas City Royals ===
On November 26, 2018, Greene was claimed off waivers by the Kansas City Royals. He split the 2019 season between the Double-A Northwest Arkansas Naturals and Triple-A Omaha Storm Chasers, compiling an aggregate 4–9 record with a 5.13 ERA over 29 appearances. Greene was designated for assignment following the season on November 20, 2019.

Greene did not play in a game in 2020 due to the cancellation of the minor league season because of the COVID-19 pandemic. He became a free agent on November 2, 2020.

=== Baltimore Orioles ===
On December 3, 2020, Greene signed a minor league contract with the Baltimore Orioles organization. He began the 2021 season with the Triple-A Norfolk Tides. Greene was promoted to the major leagues for the first time on July 24, 2021. He made his MLB debut on July 27, against the Miami Marlins, allowing one run over two innings with two strikeouts. Greene was designated for assignment by the Orioles on August 7.

=== Los Angeles Dodgers ===
Greene was claimed off waivers by the Los Angeles Dodgers on August 9, 2021. He appeared in two games for the Dodgers, allowing no runs over two innings, before being designated for assignment on August 20.

=== Baltimore Orioles (second stint) ===
Greene was claimed back off of waivers by the Baltimore Orioles on August 23, 2021. Greene pitched in 24 total games for Baltimore during the regular season, posting a 1-3 record and 7.11 ERA with 26 strikeouts across 25 1/3 innings pitched.

On March 14, 2022, Greene re-signed with the Orioles on a minor league contract that included an invitation to spring training. In 16 games for the Triple-A Norfolk Tides, he recorded a 10.61 ERA with 18 strikeouts across 18 2/3 innings pitched. The Orioles released Greene on June 20.

=== Diablos Rojos del México ===
On July 2, 2022, Greene signed with the Diablos Rojos del México of the Mexican League. In 12 appearances, he had a 2–0 record and 6.00 ERA with nine strikeouts in 12 innings. In 2023, Greene made 30 appearances, compiling a 4–3 record and 5.65 ERA with 38 strikeouts over 51 innings.

=== Cañeros de Los Mochis ===
Greene played winter baseball in the Mexican Pacific League for the Cañeros de Los Mochis during the 2022–23 and 2023–24 seasons. He recorded a 1–1 record with a 5.00 ERA in 2022–23 and an 0–1 record with a 6.52 ERA in 2023–24.

=== Houston Astros ===
Greene signed a minor league contract with the Houston Astros on February 23, 2024. He spent the 2024 season with the Triple-A Sugar Land Space Cowboys, making 34 appearances and compiling a 6–3 record with a 4.68 ERA and 59 strikeouts across 57 2/3 innings pitched. Greene elected free agency following the season on November 4.

=== Wei Chuan Dragons ===
On June 19, 2025, Greene signed with the Wei Chuan Dragons of the Chinese Professional Baseball League. He did not make an appearance for the Dragons' main team, instead spending time with the farm team. On August 17, Greene was released by the Dragons.

=== Adelaide Giants ===
Greene played in the Australian Baseball League for the Adelaide Giants during the 2025–26 season, making four starts and posting a 1–1 record with a 0.92 ERA over 19 2/3 innings with 23 strikeouts.

=== Lexington Legends ===
On March 11, 2026, Greene signed with the Lexington Legends of the Atlantic League of Professional Baseball. He was honored as the Atlantic League Pitcher of the Week for May 19-24, after tossing a complete game shutout. On May 24, Greene left the team to pursue an opportunity in Mexico. In 5 starts he threw 28 innings going 3-2 with a 2.25 ERA with 27 strikeouts.

=== Guerreros de Oaxaca ===
On May 29, 2026, Greene signed with the Guerreros de Oaxaca of the Mexican League.

== Personal life ==
Greene is an avid surfer and has spent portions of his off‑seasons in California, where he enjoys activities like hiking, beach outings, and gymnastics training during downtime from baseball. He has also worked as a model and appeared in television commercials from a young age. Greene appeared as an extra portraying a baseball player and a bar patron in two episodes of the television sitcom Anger Management in 2014. Known for his upbeat personality, teammates and coaches have described him as bringing "good vibes" and humor to clubhouses throughout his professional journey.
