= 2021 Tampa Bay Rays season =

2021 Tampa Bay Rays
- American League East champions
- League: American League
- Division: East
- Ballpark: Tropicana Field
- City: St. Petersburg, Florida
- Record: 100–62 (.617)
- Divisional place: 1st
- Owners: Stuart Sternberg
- Manager: Kevin Cash
- Television: Bally Sports Sun; Bally Sports Florida (Dewayne Staats, Brian Anderson)
- Radio: Tampa Bay Rays Radio Network (English) (Andy Freed, Dave Wills); WGES (Spanish) (Ricardo Taveras, Enrique Oliu)

The 2021 Tampa Bay Rays season was the 24th season of the Tampa Bay Rays franchise and their 14th as the Rays. The Rays played their home games at Tropicana Field as members of Major League Baseball's American League East.

The Rays finished with a 100–62 record, winning the American League East division title for the second consecutive season. It was the first time in franchise history the Rays repeated as division champions, and the first time in franchise history the Rays won 100 games. Manager Kevin Cash was named the American League Manager of the Year. However, they were upset in the ALDS, losing in 4 games to the Boston Red Sox.

== Season standings ==
=== American League East ===
AL East
Team	W	L	Pct.	GB	Home	Road
Tampa Bay Rays	100	62	.617	—	52‍–‍29	48‍–‍33
Boston Red Sox	92	70	.568	8	49‍–‍32	43‍–‍38
New York Yankees	92	70	.568	8	46‍–‍35	46‍–‍35
Toronto Blue Jays	91	71	.562	9	47‍–‍33	44‍–‍38
Baltimore Orioles	52	110	.321	48	27‍–‍54	25‍–‍56

=== American League Wild Card ===
Division leaders
Team	W	L	Pct.
Tampa Bay Rays	100	62	.617
Houston Astros	95	67	.586
Chicago White Sox	93	69	.574

Wild Card teams (Top 2 teams qualify for postseason)
Team	W	L	Pct.	GB
Boston Red Sox	92	70	.568	—
New York Yankees	92	70	.568	—
Toronto Blue Jays	91	71	.562	1
Seattle Mariners	90	72	.556	2
Oakland Athletics	86	76	.531	6
Cleveland Indians	80	82	.494	12
Los Angeles Angels	77	85	.475	15
Detroit Tigers	77	85	.475	15
Kansas City Royals	74	88	.457	18
Minnesota Twins	73	89	.451	19
Texas Rangers	60	102	.370	32
Baltimore Orioles	52	110	.321	40

=== Rays team leaders ===
Batting
Batting average†	Randy Arozarena	.274
Runs scored	Brandon Lowe	97
RBIs	Austin Meadows	106
Home runs	Brandon Lowe	39
Stolen bases	Randy Arozarena	20
Pitching
ERA‡	Ryan Yarbrough	5.11
WHIP‡	Ryan Yarbrough	1.23
Wins	Josh Fleming; Shane McClanahan	10
Strikeouts	Shane McClanahan	141
Saves	Diego Castillo	14

Source:2021 Tampa Bay Rays statistics at Baseball Reference

Updated through game of September 9.
† Minimum 3.1 plate appearances per team games played
AVG qualified batters: Arozarena, Díaz, Lowe, Meadows
‡ Minimum 1 inning pitched per team games played
ERA & WHIP qualified pitchers: None

=== Record against opponents ===
2021 American League record Source: MLB Standings Grid – 2021
Team	BAL	BOS	CWS	CLE	DET	HOU	KC	LAA	MIN	NYY	OAK	SEA	TB	TEX	TOR	NL
Baltimore	—	6–13	0–7	2–5	2–5	3–3	4–3	2–4	2–4	8–11	3–3	3–4	1–18	4–3	5–14	7–13
Boston	13–6	—	3–4	4–2	3–3	2–5	5–2	3–3	5–2	10–9	3–3	4–3	8–11	3–4	10–9	16–4
Chicago	7–0	4–3	—	10–9	12–7	2–5	9–10	2–5	13–6	1–5	4–3	3–3	3–3	5–1	4–3	14–6
Cleveland	5–2	2–4	9–10	—	12–7	1–6	14–5	5–1	8–11	3–4	2–4	3–4	1–6	4–2	2–5	9–11
Detroit	5–2	3–3	7–12	7–12	—	5–2	8–11	1–6	8–11	3–3	1–6	5–1	4–3	6–1	3–3	11–9
Houston	3–3	5–2	5–2	6–1	2–5	—	3–4	13–6	3–4	2–4	11–8	11–8	4–2	14–5	4–2	9–11
Kansas City	3–4	2–5	10–9	5–14	11–8	4–3	—	2–4	10–9	2–4	2–5	4–3	2–4	2–4	3–4	12–8
Los Angeles	4–2	3–3	5–2	1–5	6–1	6–13	4–2	—	5–2	4–3	4–15	8–11	1–6	11–8	4–3	11–9
Minnesota	4–2	2–5	6–13	11–8	11–8	4–3	9–10	2–5	—	1–6	1–5	2–4	3–3	4–3	3–4	10–10
New York	11–8	9–10	5–1	4–3	3–3	4–2	4–2	3–4	6–1	—	4–3	5–2	8–11	6–1	8–11	12–8
Oakland	3–3	3–3	3–4	4–2	6–1	8–11	5–2	15–4	5–1	3–4	—	4–15	4–3	10–9	2–5	11–9
Seattle	4–3	3–4	3–3	4–3	1–5	8–11	3–4	11–8	4–2	2–5	15–4	—	6–1	13–6	4–2	9–11
Tampa Bay	18–1	11–8	3–3	6–1	3–4	2–4	4–2	6–1	3–3	11–8	3–4	1–6	—	3–4	11–8	15–5
Texas	3–4	4–3	1–5	2–4	1–6	5–14	4–2	8–11	3–4	1–6	9–10	6–13	4–3	—	2–4	7–13
Toronto	14–5	9–10	3–4	5–2	3–3	2–4	4–3	3–4	4–3	11–8	5–2	2–4	8–11	4–2	—	14–6

Updated with the results of all games through October 3, 2021.

== Game log ==
=== Regular season ===
The 2021 regular season schedule was announced on July 9, 2020.

Legend
	Rays win
	Rays loss
	Postponement
**Bold**	Rays team member

2021 Game Log: 100–62 (Home: 52–29; Away: 48–33)
April: 13–14 (Home: 6–9; Away: 7–5)

#	Date	Opponent	Score	Win	Loss	Save	Attendance	Record	Streak/Recap
1	April 1	@ Marlins	1–0	**Thompson** (1–0)	García (0–1)	**Castillo** (1)	7,062	1–0	W1
2	April 2	@ Marlins	6–4	**Kittredge** (1–0)	Bass (0–1)	**Castillo** (2)	6,115	2–0	W2
3	April 3	@ Marlins	7–12	Bleier (1–0)	**Archer** (0–1)	—	6,179	2–1	L1
4	April 5	@ Red Sox	2–11	Pivetta (1–0)	**Wacha** (0–1)	—	4,577	2–2	L2
5	April 6	@ Red Sox	5–6 (12)	Valdéz (1–0)	**Thompson** (1–1)	—	4,682	2–3	L3
6	April 7	@ Red Sox	2–9	Eovaldi (1–1)	**Yarbrough** (0–1)	—	4,751	2–4	L4
7	April 9	Yankees	10–5	**Hill** (1–0)	Kluber (0–1)	—	9,021	3–4	W1
8	April 10	Yankees	4–0	**Kittredge** (2–0)	Germán (0–2)	—	6,270	4–4	W2
9	April 11	Yankees	4–8 (10)	Chapman (1–0)	**McHugh** (0–1)	—	6,965	4–5	L1
10	April 12	Rangers	1–0	**Glasnow** (1–0)	Hearn (0–1)	**Castillo** (3)	3,627	5–5	W1
11	April 13	Rangers	3–8	Gibson (2–0)	**Yarbrough** (0–2)	—	4,753	5–6	L1
12	April 14	Rangers	1–5	Arihara (1–1)	**Fleming** (0–1)	—	3,021	5–7	L2
13	April 15	Rangers	4–6 (10)	Sborz (1–0)	**Reed** (0–1)	Kennedy (3)	4,217	5–8	L3
14	April 16	@ Yankees	8–2	**Wacha** (1–1)	Nelson (0–2)	—	10,202	6–8	W1
15	April 17	@ Yankees	6–3	**Glasnow** (2–0)	Montgomery (1–1)	**Castillo** (4)	10,583	7–8	W2
16	April 18	@ Yankees	4–2	**Yarbrough** (1–2)	Cole (2–1)	**Springs** (1)	10,606	8–8	W3
17	April 19	@ Royals	4–1	**Fleming** (1–1)	Duffy (2–1)	—	5,589	9–8	W4
18	April 20	@ Royals	14–7	**Kittredge** (3–0)	Keller (1–2)	**Richards** (1)	4,481	10–8	W5
19	April 21	@ Royals	8–9	Barlow (1–0)	**Castillo** (0–1)	—	5,053	10–9	L1
20	April 23	Blue Jays	3–5	Matz (4–0)	**Glasnow** (2–1)	Dolis (1)	5,564	10–10	L2
21	April 24	Blue Jays	5–3	**Thompson** (2–1)	Romano (1–1)	**Kittredge** (1)	6,688	11–10	W1
22	April 25	Blue Jays	0–1	Mayza (1–0)	**Fleming** (1–2)	Dolis (2)	6,372	11–11	L1
23	April 26	Athletics	1–2	Manaea (3–1)	**Hill** (1–1)	Trivino (3)	2,981	11–12	L2
24	April 27	Athletics	4–3	**Springs** (1–0)	Montas (2–2)	**Castillo** (5)	2,924	12–12	W1
25	April 28	Athletics	2–0	**Glasnow** (3–1)	Irvin (2–3)	**Castillo** (6)	3,374	13–12	W2
26	April 29	Athletics	2–3	Diekman (1–0)	**Castillo** (0–2)	Trivino (4)	3,737	13–13	L1
27	April 30	Astros	2–9	McCullers Jr. (2–1)	**Yarbrough** (1–3)	—	6,169	13–14	L2

May: 22–6 (Home: 9–4; Away: 13–2)

#	Date	Opponent	Score	Win	Loss	Save	Attendance	Record	Streak/Recap
28	May 1	Astros	1–3	Urquidy (2–2)	**Fleming** (1–3)	Pressly (4)	7,335	13–15	L3
29	May 2	Astros	5–4	**Springs** (2–0)	Raley (0–1)	**Castillo** (7)	6,933	14–15	W1
30	May 3	@ Angels	7–3	**Glasnow** (4–1)	Quintana (0–3)	—	10,641	15–15	W2
31	May 4	@ Angels	8–3	**Patiño** (1–0)	Cobb (1–2)	—	8,152	16–15	W3
32	May 5	@ Angels	3–1	**Yarbrough** (2–3)	Guerra (2–1)	**Springs** (2)	9,169	17–15	W4
33	May 6	@ Angels	8–3	**Fleming** (2–3)	Mayers (1–2)	—	8,840	18–15	W5
34	May 7	@ Athletics	1–2	Diekman (2–0)	**Springs** (2–1)	—	5,058	18–16	L1
35	May 8	@ Athletics	3–6	Montas (4–2)	**Glasnow** (4–2)	Trivino (6)	7,707	18–17	L2
36	May 9	@ Athletics	4–3	**Springs** (3–1)	Irvin (3–4)	**Kittredge** (2)	6,911	19–17	W1
37	May 11	Yankees	1–3	Montgomery (2–1)	**Patiño** (1–1)	Chapman (8)	5,441	19–18	L1
38	May 12	Yankees	0–1	Cole (5–1)	**Thompson** (2–2)	Chapman (9)	5,668	19–19	L2
39	May 13	Yankees	9–1	**Hill** (2–1)	Taillon (1–3)	—	6,229	20–19	W1
40	May 14	Mets	3–2	**Fairbanks** (1–0)	Castro (0–1)	—	7,123	21–19	W2
41	May 15	Mets	12–5	**McClanahan** (1–0)	Lucchesi (1–3)	—	7,536	22–19	W3
42	May 16	Mets	7–1	**Fleming** (3–3)	Stroman (3–4)	—	7,355	23–19	W4
43	May 18	@ Orioles	13–6	**Kittredge** (4–0)	Harvey (3–4)	—	5,429	24–19	W5
44	May 19	@ Orioles	9–7	**Thompson** (3–2)	Fry (0–1)	**Fairbanks** (1)	6,581	25–19	W6
45	May 20	@ Orioles	10–1	**Hill** (3–1)	Kremer (0–4)	—	6,916	26–19	W7
46	May 21	@ Blue Jays^{[a]}	9–7 (12)	**Castillo** (1–2)	Beasley (0–1)	—	1,437	27–19	W8
47	May 22	@ Blue Jays^{[a]}	3–1	**Kittredge** (5–0)	Castro (0–1)	**Castillo** (8)	1,514	28–19	W9
48	May 23	@ Blue Jays^{[a]}	6–4	**Fleming** (4–3)	Chatwood (0–1)	**Feyereisen** (1)	1,496	29–19	W10
49	May 24	@ Blue Jays^{[a]}	14–8 (11)	**Springs** (4–1)	Payamps (0–2)	—	1,641	30–19	W11
50	May 25	Royals	1–2	Keller (4–4)	**Hill** (3–2)	Zimmer (2)	4,946	30–20	L1
51	May 26	Royals	2–1 (10)	**Feyereisen** (1–2)	Zuber (0–2)	—	4,973	31–20	W1
52	May 27	Royals	7–2	**McClanahan** (2–0)	Singer (2–4)	—	5,519	32–20	W2
53	May 29	Phillies	5–3	**Castillo** (2–2)	Coonrod (0–2)	**Feyereisen** (2)	7,316	33–20	W3
54	May 30	Phillies	6–2	**Fleming** (5–3)	Eflin (2–5)	—	7,479	34–20	W4
55	May 31	@ Yankees	3–1	**Hill** (4–2)	Taillon (1–4)	**Feyereisen** (3)	17,008	35–20	W5

June: 12–14 (Home: 8–3; Away: 4–11)

#	Date	Opponent	Score	Win	Loss	Save	Attendance	Record	Streak/Recap
56	June 1	@ Yankees	3–5 (11)	Cessa (1–0)	**Kittredge** (5–1)	—	12,537	35–21	L1
57	June 2	@ Yankees	3–4	Montgomery (3–1)	**McClanahan** (2–1)	Chapman (12)	13,824	35–22	L2
58	June 3	@ Yankees	9–2	**Yarbrough** (3–3)	Cole (6–3)	—	12,614	36–22	W1
59	June 4	@ Rangers	4–5	Gibson (4–0)	**Fleming** (5–4)	Kennedy (12)	30,635	36–23	L1
60	June 5	@ Rangers	3–0	**Hill** (5–2)	Allard (1–2)	**Castillo** (9)	27,237	37–23	W1
61	June 6	@ Rangers	7–1	**Feyereisen** (2–2)	King (5–4)	—	26,442	38–23	W2
62	June 8	Nationals	3–1	**Glasnow** (5–2)	Suero (0–1)	**Castillo** (10)	7,173	39–23	W3
63	June 9	Nationals	7–9 (11)	Hand (3–2)	**Castillo** (2–3)	Rainey (1)	7,616	39–24	L1
64	June 11	Orioles	4–2	**Yarbrough** (4–3)	Akin (0–1)	**Fairbanks** (2)	6,211	40–24	W1
65	June 12	Orioles	5–4	**McHugh** (1–1)	López (2–7)	**Castillo** (11)	9,225	41–24	W2
66	June 13	Orioles	7–1	**Fleming** (6–4)	Zimmermann (4–4)	—	9,101	42–24	W3
67	June 14	@ White Sox	5–2	**Feyereisen** (3–2)	Lynn (7–2)	**Fairbanks** (3)	18,024	43–24	W4
68	June 15	@ White Sox	0–3	Keuchel (6–1)	**McClanahan** (2–2)	Hendriks (18)	19,259	43–25	L1
69	June 16	@ White Sox	7–8 (10)	Burr (1–0)	**Fairbanks** (1–1)	—	20,098	43–26	L2
70	June 17	@ Mariners	5–6	Santiago (1–1)	**Fairbanks** (1–2)	—	9,092	43–27	L3
71	June 18	@ Mariners	1–5	Kikuchi (4–3)	**Wacha** (1–2)	—	12,654	43–28	L4
72	June 19	@ Mariners	5–6 (10)	Montero (4–2)	**Feyereisen** (3–3)	—	14,772	43–29	L5
73	June 20	@ Mariners	2–6 (10)	Montero (5–2)	**Castillo** (2–4)	—	18,172	43–30	L6
74	June 22	Red Sox	5–9 (11)	Hernández (2–2)	**Fairbanks** (1–3)	—	12,994	43–31	L7
75	June 23	Red Sox	8–2	**Hill** (6–2)	Richards (4–5)	—	9,088	44–31	W1
76	June 24	Red Sox	1–0	**Feyereisen** (4–3)	Barnes (3–2)	—	10,961	45–31	W2
77	June 25	Angels	4–3	**McHugh** (2–1)	Suárez (2–1)	**Castillo** (12)	7,909	46–31	W3
78	June 26	Angels	13–3	**McClanahan** (3–2)	Cobb (5–3)	—	16,699	47–31	W4
79	June 27	Angels	4–6	Watson (3–3)	**Wisler** (1–3)	Iglesias (13)	12,764	47–32	L1
80	June 29	@ Nationals	3–4	Ross (5–7)	**Hill** (6–3)	Hand (18)	17,117	47–33	L2
81	June 30	@ Nationals	6–15	Lester (2–3)	**Sherriff** (0–1)	—	15,552	47–34	L3

July: 16–8 (Home: 10–4; Away: 6–4)

#	Date	Opponent	Score	Win	Loss	Save	Attendance	Record	Streak/Recap
82	July 2	@ Blue Jays^{[b]}	1–11	Manoah (2–0)	**Patiño** (1–2)	—	10,011	47–35	L4
83	July 3	@ Blue Jays^{[b]}	3–6	Cimber (2–2)	**McClanahan** (3–3)	—	9,189	47–36	L5
84	July 4	@ Blue Jays^{[b]}	5–1	**Yarbrough** (5–3)	Ray (6–4)	—	7,537	48–36	W1
85	July 5	Indians	9–8	**Fairbanks** (2–3)	Clase (3–4)	—	8,832	49–36	W2
—	July 6	Indians	Postponed (Tropical Storm Elsa) make-up date July 7						
86	July 7 (1)	Indians	8–1 (7)	**Wacha** (2–2)	Mejía (1–4)	—	N/A	50–36	W3
87	July 7 (2)	Indians	4–0 (7)	**Fleming** (7–4)	Hentges (1–4)	—	10,905	51–36	W4
88	July 9	Blue Jays	7–1	**Kittredge** (6–1)	Manoah (2–1)	—	8,551	52–36	W5
89	July 10	Blue Jays	5–2	**Yarbrough** (6–3)	Stripling (3–5)	**Castillo** (13)	9,954	53–36	W6
90	July 11	Blue Jays	1–3	Ray (7–4)	**Hill** (6–4)	Romano (7)	11,233	53–37	L1
**91st All-Star Game in Denver**
91	July 16	@ Braves	7–6 (10)	**Wisler** (2–3)	Chavez (0–2)	**Fairbanks** (4)	40,485	54–37	W1
92	July 17	@ Braves	0–9	Fried (7–5)	**Fleming** (7–5)	—	40,868	54–38	L1
93	July 18	@ Braves	7–5	**Springs** (5–1)	Minter (1–4)	**Fairbanks** (5)	34,544	55–38	W1
94	July 19	Orioles	1–6	Watkins (2–0)	**Yarbrough** (6–4)	—	9,922	55–39	L1
95	July 20	Orioles	9–3	**McClanahan** (4–3)	Means (4–3)	—	10,399	56–39	W1
96	July 21	Orioles	5–4	**McHugh** (3–1)	Scott (3–4)	—	8,968	57–39	W2
97	July 22	@ Indians	5–4 (10)	**Fairbanks** (3–3)	Shaw (3–4)	**Castillo** (14)	19,338	58–39	W3
98	July 23	@ Indians	10–5	**Wisler** (3–3)	Wittgren (2–3)	—	23,180	59–39	W4
99	July 24	@ Indians	8–2	**Head** (1–0)	Mejía (1–6)	—	23,324	60–39	W5
100	July 25	@ Indians	2–3	Karinchak (7–2)	**Wisler** (3–4)	Clase (12)	18,614	60–40	L1
101	July 27	Yankees	3–4	Montgomery (4–5)	**McClanahan** (4–4)	Chapman (19)	12,678	60–41	L2
102	July 28	Yankees	1–3 (10)	Green (4–5)	**Fairbanks** (3–4)	Chapman (20)	11,525	60–42	L3
103	July 29	Yankees	14–0	**Patiño** (2–2)	Cole (10–6)	—	14,134	61–42	W1
104	July 30	Red Sox	7–3	**Fleming** (8–5)	Pérez (7–7)	—	11,109	62–42	W2
105	July 31	Red Sox	9–5	**Kittredge** (7–1)	Eovaldi (9–6)	—	20,521	63–42	W3

August: 21–6 (Home: 10–3; Away: 11–3)

#	Date	Opponent	Score	Win	Loss	Save	Attendance	Record	Streak/Recap
106	August 1	Red Sox	3–2	**McClanahan** (5–4)	Pivetta (8–5)	**Wisler** (1)	17,816	64–42	W4
107	August 2	Mariners	2–8	Flexen (10–5)	**Wacha** (2–3)	—	5,855	64–43	L1
108	August 3	Mariners	2–4	Kikuchi (7–6)	**Patiño** (2–3)	Castillo (15)	10,071	64–44	L2
109	August 4	Mariners	4–3	**Fleming** (9–5)	Gilbert (5–3)	**Sherriff** (1)	9,701	65–44	W1
110	August 6	@ Orioles	10–6	**Rasmussen** (1–1)	Fry (4–4)	—	11,320	66–44	W2
111	August 7	@ Orioles	12–3	**McClanahan** (6–4)	Watkins (2–3)	—	18,545	67–44	W3
112	August 8	@ Orioles	9–6	**Chargois** (2–0)	Fry (4–5)	—	10,576	68–44	W4
113	August 10	@ Red Sox	8–4	**Kittredge** (8–1)	Barnes (6–5)	—	25,356	69–44	W5
114	August 11	@ Red Sox	8–20	Eovaldi (10–7)	**Fleming** (9–6)	—	30,286	69–45	L1
115	August 12	@ Red Sox	8–1	**McHugh** (4–1)	Houck (0–3)	—	26,803	70–45	W1
116	August 13	@ Twins	10–4	**McClanahan** (7–4)	Pineda (4–8)	**Phillips** (1)	23,125	71–45	W2
117	August 14	@ Twins	0–12	Maeda (6–4)	**Wacha** (2–4)	—	21,034	71–46	L1
118	August 15	@ Twins	4–5	Colomé (3–4)	**Wisler** (3–5)	—	22,467	71–47	L2
119	August 16	Orioles	9–2	**Fleming** (10–6)	Harvey (6–12)	—	5,460	72–47	W1
120	August 17	Orioles	10–0	**Ellis** (1–0)	Means (5–5)	—	4,795	73–47	W2
121	August 18	Orioles	8–4	**Yarbrough** (7–4)	Watkins (2–5)	—	6,673	74–47	W3
122	August 19	Orioles	7–2	**McClanahan** (8–4)	López (3–14)	—	5,826	75–47	W4
123	August 20	White Sox	5–7 (10)	Hendriks (8–3)	**Kittredge** (8–2)	Tepera (2)	13,178	75–48	L1
124	August 21	White Sox	8–4	**Patiño** (3–3)	Keuchel (8–7)	**McHugh** (1)	22,275	76–48	W1
125	August 22	White Sox	9–0	**Armstrong** (1–0)	López (2–1)	**Fleming** (1)	16,696	77–48	W2
126	August 24	@ Phillies	3–1	**Chargois** (3–0)	Bradley (7–2)	**Kittredge** (3)	23,402	78–48	W3
127	August 25	@ Phillies	7–4	**McHugh** (5–1)	Wheeler (10–9)	—	25,552	79–48	W4
128	August 27	@ Orioles	6–3	**McClanahan** (9–4)	Harvey (6–14)	**Mazza** (1)	7,155	80–48	W5
129	August 28	@ Orioles	4–3	**Chargois** (4–0)	Sulser (3–3)	**Kittredge** (4)	11,110	81–48	W6
130	August 29	@ Orioles	12–8	**Chargois** (5–0)	Watkins (2–7)	—	8,353	82–48	W7
131	August 30	Red Sox	6–1	**Patiño** (4–3)	Pivetta (9–7)	—	6,753	83–48	W8
132	August 31	Red Sox	8–5	**Yarbrough** (8–4)	Peacock (0–1)	**Kittredge** (5)	6,868	84–48	W9

September: 14–13 (Home: 9–6; Away: 5–7)

#	Date	Opponent	Score	Win	Loss	Save	Attendance	Record	Streak/Recap
133	September 1	Red Sox	2–3	Whitlock (7–2)	**Fairbanks** (3–5)	Ottavino (11)	7,808	84–49	L1
134	September 2	Red Sox	0–4	Rodríguez (11–7)	**McClanahan** (9–5)	Richards (2)	7,923	84–50	L2
135	September 3	Twins	5–3	**Wacha** (3–4)	Dobnak (1–7)	**Kittredge** (6)	8,864	85–50	W1
136	September 4	Twins	11–4	**Archer** (1–1)	Albers (1–1)	**Enns** (1)	13,861	86–50	W2
137	September 5	Twins	5–6	Duffey (3–3)	**Kittredge** (8–3)	Colomé (11)	14,165	86–51	L1
138	September 6	@ Red Sox	11–10 (10)	**McHugh** (6–1)	Whitlock (7–3)	—	26,512	87–51	W1
139	September 7	@ Red Sox	12–7	**Rasmussen** (2–1)	Rodríguez (11–8)	—	25,065	88–51	W2
140	September 8	@ Red Sox	1–2	Richards (7–7)	**Chargois** (5–1)	Robles (12)	26,649	88–52	L1
141	September 10	@ Tigers	4–10	Cisnero (4–4)	**Fairbanks** (3–6)	—	18,321	88–53	L2
142	September 11	@ Tigers	7–2	**Enns** (1–0)	Mize (7–8)	—	18,842	89–53	W1
143	September 12	@ Tigers	7–8 (11)	Funkhouser (7–3)	**Feyereisen** (4–4)	—	13,396	89–54	L1
144	September 13	@ Blue Jays	1–8	Manoah (6–2)	**Yarbrough** (8–5)	—	12,119	89–55	L2
145	September 14	@ Blue Jays	2–0	**Rasmussen** (3–1)	Berríos (11–8)	**Kittredge** (7)	13,103	90–55	W1
146	September 15	@ Blue Jays	3–6	Ray (12–5)	**Wacha** (3–5)	Romano (18)	12,153	90–56	L1
147	September 16	Tigers	5–2	**Enns** (2–0)	Alexander (2–3)	—	10,206	91–56	W1
148	September 17	Tigers	7–4 (10)	**Kittredge** (9–3)	Garcia (2–2)	—	16,451	92–56	W2
149	September 18	Tigers	3–4	Ureña (4–8)	**Yarbrough** (8–6)	Fulmer (10)	22,921	92–57	L1
150	September 19	Tigers	0–2	Peralta (4–3)	**McClanahan** (9–6)	Funkhouser (1)	17,948	92–58	L2
151	September 20	Blue Jays	6–4	**Baz** (1–0)	Ray (12–6)	**Enns** (2)	10,119	93–58	W1
152	September 21	Blue Jays	2–4	Manoah (7–2)	**Anderson** (0–1)	Romano (20)	9,888	93–59	L1
153	September 22	Blue Jays	7–1	**Chargois** (6–1)	Stripling (5–7)	—	10,994	94–59	W1
154	September 24	Marlins	8–0	**Yarbrough** (9–6)	Cabrera (0–3)	—	15,340	95–59	W2
155	September 25	Marlins	7–3	**McClanahan** (10–6)	Alcántara (9–14)	—	23,783	96–59	W3
156	September 26	Marlins	3–2	**Baz** (2–0)	Luzardo (5–9)	**Anderson** (1)	20,826	97–59	W4
157	September 28	@ Astros	3–4	Maton (5–0)	**Fleming** (10–7)	—	32,297	97–60	L1
158	September 29	@ Astros	7–0	**Rasmussen** (4–1)	García (11–8)	—	28,321	98–60	W1
159	September 30	@ Astros	2–3	McCullers Jr. (13–5)	**Yarbrough** (9–7)	Pressly (26)	31,608	98–61	L1

October: 2–1 (Home: 0–0; Away: 2–1)

#	Date	Opponent	Score	Win	Loss	Save	Attendance	Record	Streak/Recap
160	October 1	@ Yankees	4–3	**Head** (2–0)	Cortés Jr. (2–3)	**Kittredge** (8)	41,469	99–61	W1
161	October 2	@ Yankees	12–2	**Patiño** (5–3)	Montgomery (6–7)	—	41,648	100–61	W2
162	October 3	@ Yankees	0–1	Chapman (6–4)	**Fleming** (10–8)	—	40,409	100–62	L1

- ^{a} Games played at TD Ballpark in Dunedin, Florida.
- ^{b} Games played at Sahlen Field in Buffalo, New York.

== Player stats ==
=== Batting ===
Note: G = Games played; AB = At bats; R = Runs; H = Hits; 2B = Doubles; 3B = Triples; HR = Home runs; RBI = Runs batted in; SB = Stolen bases; BB = Walks; AVG = Batting average; SLG = Slugging average

Player	G	AB	R	H	2B	3B	HR	RBI	SB	BB	AVG	SLG
Brandon Lowe	149	535	97	132	31	0	39	99	7	68	.247	.523
Randy Arozarena	141	529	94	145	32	3	20	69	20	56	.274	.459
Austin Meadows	142	518	79	121	29	3	27	106	4	59	.234	.458
Yandy Díaz	134	465	62	119	20	1	13	64	1	69	.256	.387
Joey Wendle	136	460	73	122	31	4	11	54	8	28	.265	.422
Manuel Margot	125	421	55	107	18	3	10	57	13	37	.254	.382
Kevin Kiermaier	122	348	54	90	19	7	4	37	9	33	.259	.388
Mike Zunino	109	333	64	72	11	2	33	62	0	34	.216	.559
Wander Franco	70	281	53	81	18	5	7	39	2	24	.288	.463
Ji-man Choi	83	258	36	59	14	0	11	45	0	45	.229	.411
Brett Phillips	118	253	50	52	9	4	13	44	14	33	.206	.427
Francisco Mejía	84	250	31	65	15	3	6	35	0	17	.260	.416
Nelson Cruz	55	217	35	49	8	0	13	36	0	16	.226	.442
Taylor Walls	54	152	15	32	10	0	1	15	4	23	.211	.296
Mike Brosseau	57	150	21	28	9	0	5	18	2	15	.187	.347
Willy Adames	41	132	16	26	6	1	5	15	1	10	.197	.371
Yoshi Tsutsugo	26	78	5	13	4	0	0	5	0	8	.167	.218
Jordan Luplow	25	65	11	16	3	0	4	8	1	7	.246	.477
Vidal Bruján	10	26	3	2	0	0	0	2	1	0	.077	.077
Kevin Padlo	9	12	1	1	1	0	0	0	0	2	.083	.167
Kevan Smith	3	4	2	1	0	0	0	0	0	0	.250	.250
Joseph Odom	2	2	0	0	0	0	0	0	0	0	.000	.000
Josh Lowe	2	1	0	1	0	0	0	0	1	1	1.000	1.000
Pitcher totals	162	17	0	2	0	0	0	0	0	0	.118	.118
Team totals	162	5507	857	1336	288	36	222	810	88	585	.243	.429

=== Pitching ===
Note: W = Wins; L = Losses; ERA = Earned run average; G = Games pitched; GS = Games started; SV = Saves; IP = Innings pitched; H = Hits allowed; R = Runs allowed; ER = Earned runs allowed; BB = Walks allowed; SO = Strikeouts

Player	W	L	ERA	G	GS	SV	IP	H	R	ER	BB	SO
Ryan Yarbrough	9	7	5.11	30	21	0	155.0	163	96	88	27	117
Michael Wacha	3	5	5.05	29	23	0	124.2	132	73	70	31	121
Shane McClanahan	10	6	3.43	25	25	0	123.1	120	49	47	37	141
Josh Fleming	10	8	5.09	26	11	1	104.1	110	60	59	31	65
Rich Hill	6	4	3.87	19	19	0	95.1	75	41	41	36	91
Tyler Glasnow	5	2	2.66	14	14	0	88.0	55	26	26	27	123
Luis Patiño	5	3	4.31	19	15	0	77.1	69	40	37	29	74
Andrew Kittredge	9	3	1.88	57	4	8	71.2	55	21	15	15	77
Collin McHugh	6	1	1.55	37	7	1	64.0	48	15	11	12	74
Drew Rasmussen	4	0	2.44	20	10	0	59.0	44	16	16	13	48
Jeffrey Springs	5	1	3.43	43	0	2	44.2	35	21	17	14	63
Pete Fairbanks	3	6	3.59	47	0	5	42.2	40	22	17	21	56
J. P. Feyereisen	4	2	2.45	34	0	3	36.2	26	14	10	22	33
Diego Castillo	2	4	2.72	37	0	14	36.1	26	14	11	10	49
Louis Head	2	0	2.31	27	2	0	35.0	21	10	9	9	32
Ryan Thompson	3	2	2.38	36	0	0	34.0	26	11	9	9	37
Matt Wisler	2	3	2.15	27	0	1	29.1	22	11	7	5	36
Chris Mazza	0	0	4.61	14	0	1	27.1	26	14	14	7	21
JT Chargois	5	1	1.90	25	0	0	23.2	15	5	5	14	24
Dietrich Enns	2	0	2.82	9	0	2	22.1	17	8	7	6	25
Adam Conley	0	0	2.29	17	0	0	19.2	14	5	5	6	16
Chris Archer	1	1	4.66	6	5	0	19.1	18	11	10	8	21
Hunter Strickland	0	0	1.69	13	0	0	16.0	14	4	3	6	16
Shawn Armstrong	1	0	4.50	11	0	0	16.0	11	8	8	5	22
Ryan Sherriff	0	1	5.52	16	0	1	14.2	14	11	9	9	16
Shane Baz	2	0	2.03	3	3	0	13.1	6	3	3	3	18
Trevor Richards	0	0	4.50	6	0	1	12.0	9	6	6	3	16
David Robertson	0	0	4.50	12	1	0	12.0	11	7	6	4	16
Cody Reed	0	1	3.72	12	0	0	9.2	8	5	4	6	7
Nick Anderson	0	1	4.50	6	0	1	6.0	4	3	3	2	1
Brent Honeywell Jr.	0	0	8.31	3	2	0	4.1	5	4	4	3	4
Chris Ellis	1	0	0.00	1	0	0	4.0	3	0	0	1	7
Evan Phillips	0	0	3.00	1	0	1	3.0	3	1	1	0	2
DJ Johnson	0	0	0.00	3	0	0	2.2	0	0	0	0	2
David Hess	0	0	27.00	1	0	0	2.0	8	6	6	1	2
Francisco Mejía	0	0	27.00	2	0	0	2.0	6	6	6	0	0
Brett Phillips	0	0	9.00	1	0	0	1.0	2	1	1	2	0
Jordan Luplow	0	0	9.00	1	0	0	1.0	2	1	1	0	0
Joey Krehbiel	0	0	0.00	1	0	0	1.0	0	0	0	1	2
Sean Poppen	0	0	0.00	1	0	0	0.2	0	0	0	0	1
Chaz Roe	0	0	27.00	1	0	0	0.2	1	2	2	1	2
Team totals	100	62	3.67	162	162	42	1455.2	1264	651	593	436	1478

=== Postseason ===
2021 Postseason Game Log
American League Division Series

#	Date	Opponent	Score	Win	Loss	Save	Location Attendance	Series
1	October 7	Red Sox	5–0	McClanahan (1–0)	Rodríguez (0–1)	—	Tropicana Field; 27,419	1–0
2	October 8	Red Sox	6−14	Houck (1−0)	McHugh (0−1)	—	Tropicana Field; 37,616	1–1
3	October 10	@ Red Sox	4–6 (13)	Pivetta (1–0)	Patiño (0–1)	—	Fenway Park; 37,224	1–2
4	October 11	@ Red Sox	5–6	Whitlock (1–0)	Feyereisen (0–1)	—	Fenway Park; 38,447	1–3

== Postseason rosters ==
Playoff rosters
American League Division Series

- Pitchers: 11 Shane Baz 19 Josh Fleming 29 Pete Fairbanks 30 David Robertson 31 Collin McHugh 34 J. P. Feyereisen 36 Andrew Kittredge 37 Matt Wisler 52 Michael Wacha 57 Drew Rasmussen 61 Luis Patiño 62 Shane McClanahan 84 J. T. Chargois
- Catchers: 10 Mike Zunino 28 Francisco Mejía
- Infielders: 2 Yandy Díaz 5 Wander Franco 8 Brandon Lowe 18 Joey Wendle 26 Ji-man Choi
- Outfielders: 13 Manuel Margot 17 Austin Meadows 25 Jordan Luplow 39 Kevin Kiermaier 56 Randy Arozarena
- Designated hitters: 23 Nelson Cruz

== Roster ==
2021 Tampa Bay Rays
Roster
Pitchers: 70 Nick Anderson; 22 Chris Archer; 46 Shawn Armstrong; 11 Shane Baz; 63 Diego Castillo; 84 J. T. Chargois; 55 Adam Conley; 86 Chris Ellis; 75 Dietrich Enns; 29 Peter Fairbanks; 34 J. P. Feyereisen; 19 Josh Fleming; 20 Tyler Glasnow; 58 Louis Head; 60 David Hess; 14 Rich Hill; 45 Brent Honeywell Jr.; 55 DJ Johnson; 36 Andrew Kittredge; 64 Joey Krehbiel; 15 Chris Mazza; 62 Shane McClanahan; 31 Collin McHugh; 61 Luis Patiño; 60 Evan Phillips; 60 Sean Poppen; 57 Drew Rasmussen; 21 Cody Reed; 34 Trevor Richards; 30 David Robertson; 50 Chaz Roe; 71 Ryan Sherriff; 59 Jeffrey Springs; 60 Hunter Strickland; 81 Ryan Thompson; 52 Michael Wacha; 37 Matt Wisler; 48 Ryan Yarbrough	Catchers: 28 Francisco Mejía; 64 Joseph Odom; 44 Kevan Smith; 10 Mike Zunino; Infielders: 1 Willy Adames; 43 Mike Brosseau; 7 Vidal Bruján; 26 Ji-man Choi; 23 Nelson Cruz; 2 Yandy Díaz; 5 Wander Franco; 8 Brandon Lowe; 25 Jordan Luplow; 37 Kevin Padlo; 25 Yoshi Tsutsugo; 6 Taylor Walls; 18 Joey Wendle	Outfielders: 56 Randy Arozarena; 39 Kevin Kiermaier; 53 Josh Lowe; 13 Manuel Margot; 17 Austin Meadows; 35 Brett Phillips	Manager: 16 Kevin Cash; Coaches: 41 Stan Boroski (bullpen); 99 Misha Dworken (bullpen catcher); 97 Jonathan Erlichman (analytics coach); 24 Paul Hoover (field coordinator); 27 Rodney Linares (third base); 51 Chad Mottola (hitting); 33 Matt Quatraro (bench); 98 Jean Ramirez (bullpen catcher); 44 Kyle Snyder (pitching); 40 Ozzie Timmons (first base)

== Farm system ==
Level	Team	League	Manager
AAA	Durham Bulls	Triple-A East	Brady Williams
AA	Montgomery Biscuits	Double-A South	Morgan Ensberg
High-A	Bowling Green Hot Rods	High-A East	Jeff Smith
A	Charleston RiverDogs	Low-A East	Blake Butera
Rookie	FCL Rays	Florida Complex League	Rafael Valenzuela
Foreign Rookie	DSL Rays 1	Dominican Summer League	Esteban Gonzalez
Foreign Rookie	DSL Rays 2	Dominican Summer League	Julio Zorrilla
