= Austin Shenton =

American baseball player (born 1998)

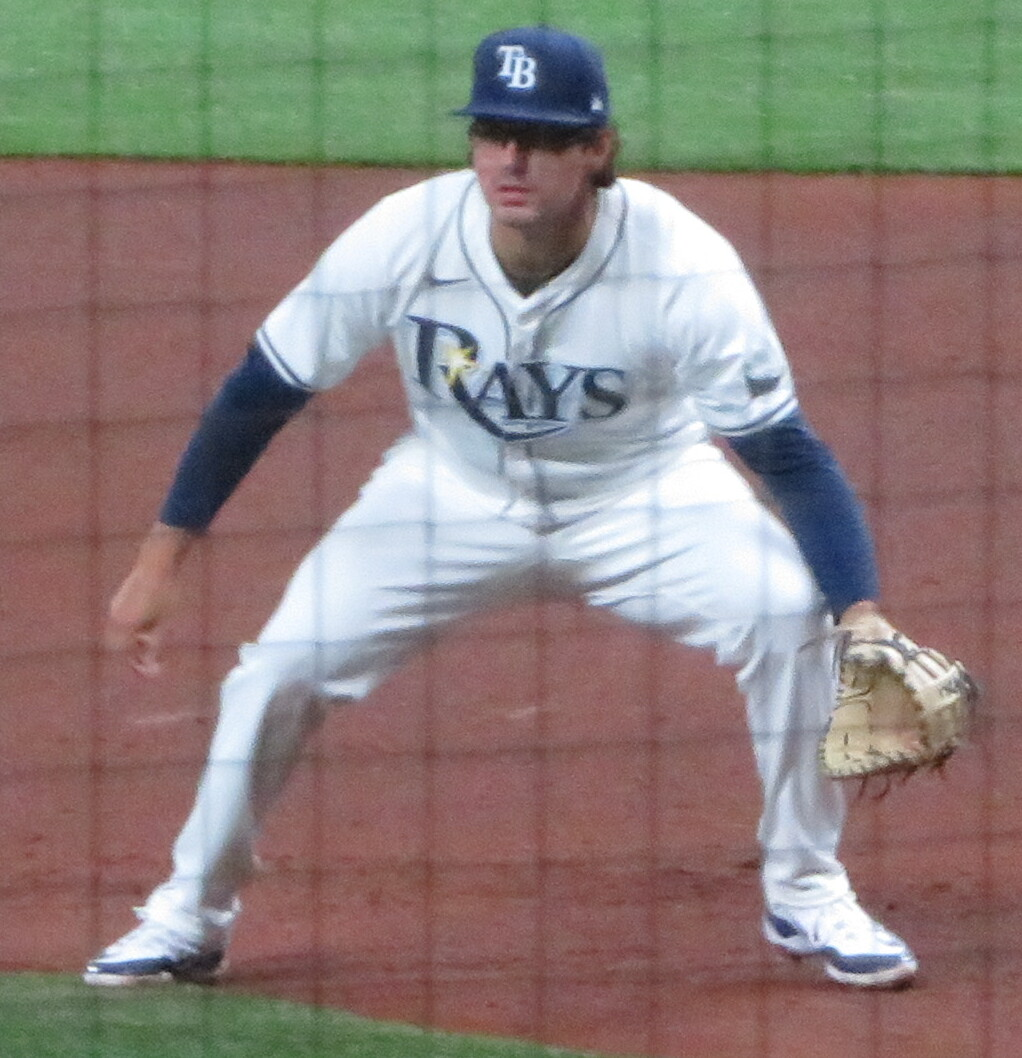
- Shenton with the Tampa Bay Rays in 2024

El Águila de Veracruz – No. 23
- First baseman / Designated hitter
- Born: January 22, 1998 (age 28); Spokane, Washington, U.S.
- Bats: Left Throws: Right

MLB debut
- March 31, 2024, for the Tampa Bay Rays

MLB statistics (through 2024 season)
- Batting average: .214
- Home runs: 1
- Runs batted in: 3
- Stats at Baseball Reference

Teams
- Tampa Bay Rays (2024)

Austin P. Shenton (born January 22, 1998) is an American professional baseball first baseman and designated hitter for the El Águila de Veracruz of the Mexican League. He has previously played in Major League Baseball (MLB) for the Tampa Bay Rays.

== Amateur career ==
Shenton attended Bellingham High School in Bellingham, Washington. He hit .472 with a .700 on-base percentage as a high school senior. He was drafted by the Cleveland Indians in the 34th round of the 2016 Major League Baseball draft but did not sign with the team.

Shenton initially committed to playing college baseball for the Washington Huskies but switched to playing at Bellevue College so he could keep his draft eligibility. At Bellevue, he hit .395 with 7 home runs. After going undrafted in 2017, he then transferred to Florida International University. In two seasons with the Panthers, he hit .337 with 16 home runs in 105 games. He was twice named to the All-Conference USA second team.

He played collegiate summer baseball with the Bellingham Bells in 2016 and 2017, then the Wareham Gatemen of the Cape Cod Baseball League in 2018, where he was named an all-star and the playoff most valuable player after Wareham's league championship.

== Professional career ==
=== Seattle Mariners ===
The Seattle Mariners selected Shenton in the fifth round of the 2019 Major League Baseball draft, and he signed with the team, getting a $336,000 signing bonus. Shenton grew up rooting for the Mariners and dreaming he would play for the team. He started his professional career that June with the Everett AquaSox before being promoted in mid-July to the West Virginia Power. He batted .298 with seven home runs and 36 RBI over 53 games between both teams in 2019. He did not play in a game in 2020 due to the cancellation of the minor league season because of the COVID-19 pandemic. Shenton spent the summer in Tacoma as part of Seattle's 60-man player pool. Shenton started 2021 with Everett before being promoted to the Double–A Arkansas Travelers in mid-July.

=== Tampa Bay Rays ===
On July 29, 2021, the Mariners traded Shenton and reliever J.T. Chargois to the Tampa Bay Rays for reliever Diego Castillo. Shenton was assigned to the Montgomery Biscuits. His season ended in mid-August due to a thumb injury. Over 80 games between Everett, Arkansas, and Montgomery, he slashed .295/.398/.549 with 14 home runs and 70 RBI.

Shenton returned to Montgomery in 2022, but a hip injury ended his season on June 22. He also started wearing corrective lens to address vision issues, including astigmatism. Shenton was on the Biscuits for a third consecutive season to start 2023, then advancing to the Triple-A Durham Bulls in July. He hit .304 with 29 home runs and 99 RBI for Montgomery and Durham in 2023. He led the International League in total bases following his July promotion to Durham.

Shenton was optioned to Durham before the start of the 2024 season. However, following several players' injuries, Shenton was added to the Rays' Opening Day roster. He made his major league debut on March 31 as a defensive replacement, hitting a flyout in his first at bat. He got his first MLB hit and RBI on a groundball double off Dakota Hudson of the Colorado Rockies on April 7. Shenton stayed on the Rays roster until May 14, when he was optioned to Durham. On September 5, the Rays recalled Shenton from Triple-A after posting a slash line of .258/.361/.497 in 83 games with 20 home runs and 65 RBI following his demotion. In 19 games in his first season in the majors, he batted .214/.340/.405 with one home run and three RBI. Shenton primarily played first base for the first time in his career in 2024, after mainly being a third baseman. On November 18, Shenton was designated for assignment by the Rays.

=== Seattle Mariners (second stint) ===
On November 19, 2024, Shenton was traded back to the Seattle Mariners in exchange for cash considerations. Shenton took the roster spot formerly held by J. T. Chargois, who was traded with Shenton to the Rays in 2021. Shenton was optioned to the Triple-A Tacoma Rainiers to begin the 2025 season. In 39 appearances for Tacoma, he slashed .207/.284/.413 with eight home runs and 26 RBI. On May 20, Shenton was designated for assignment by the Mariners. He cleared waivers and was sent outright to Tacoma on May 26. Shenton elected free agency following the season on November 6.

=== El Águila de Veracruz ===
On April 21, 2026, Shenton signed with the El Águila de Veracruz of the Mexican League.

== Personal life ==
Shenton was adopted by his aunt, Andrea Shenton, and uncle, Dana, when he was 5 years old, after spending two years in foster care. He grew up with an older brother, Ian, Andrea's son, who suffered from seizures and developmental disabilities. Shenton has raised money and donated part of his draft signing bonus to the Max Higbee Center, a nonprofit organization supporting teens and adults with developmental disabilities in his hometown of Bellingham. Shenton's Mariners teammate George Kirby has also supported the organization.

Shenton has no contact with his biological parents, and he has three other siblings. He is a member of the Chickasaw Nation.

Shenton's mother, Andrea Shenton, was diagnosed with breast cancer in 2018, which led him to consider leaving Florida International, though she requested that he continue playing baseball.

Shenton enjoys golf, using part of his draft signing bonus to buy new golf clubs. He also played basketball and tennis in high school. He was an all-conference tennis player his senior season.

Shenton co-owns a baseball training facility in Bellingham.

Shenton was a vegetarian and aspiring travel photographer, as of 2019.
