= Josh Fleming (baseball) =

American baseball player (born 1996)

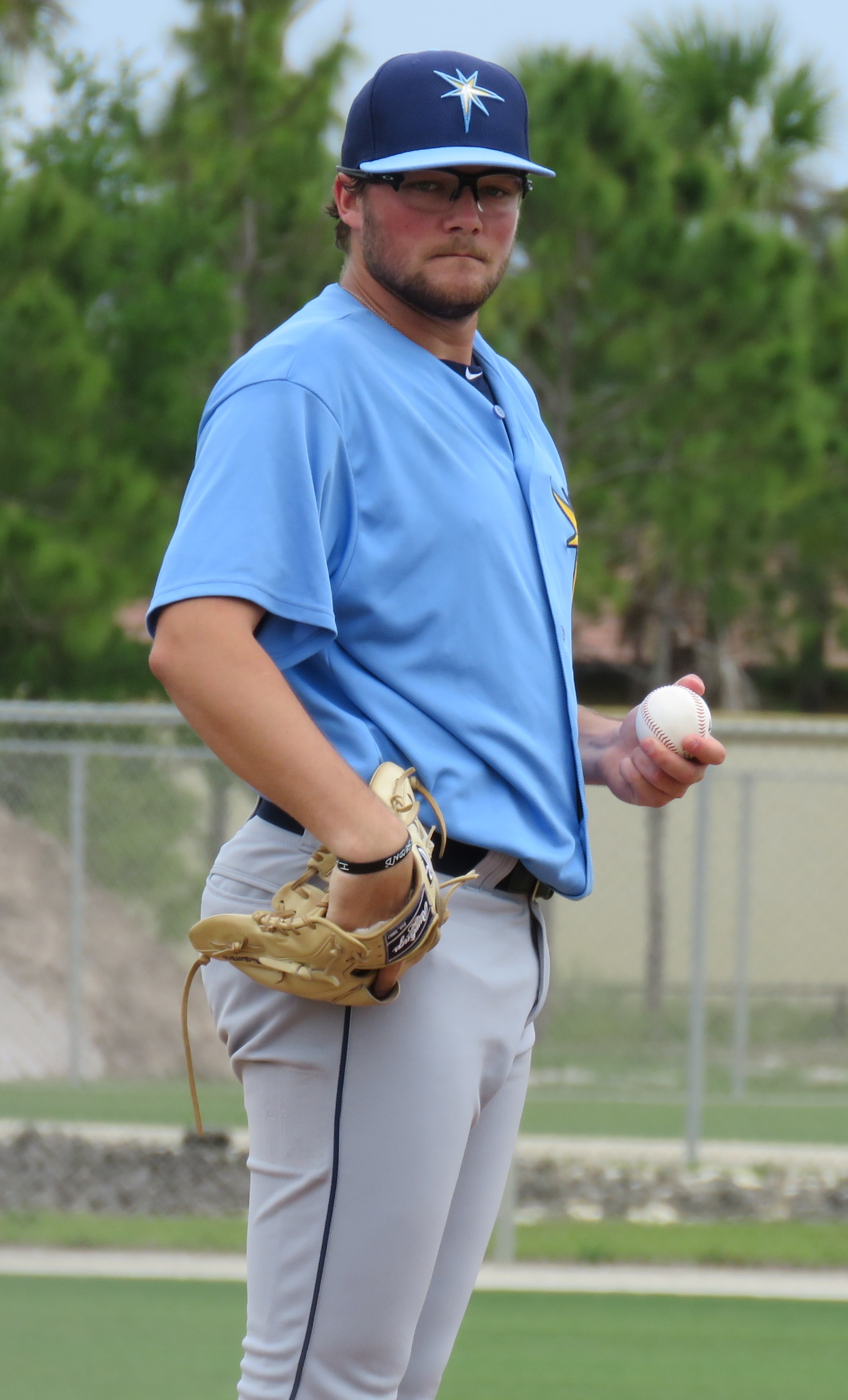
- Fleming with the Tampa Bay Rays in 2019

St. Louis Cardinals
- Pitcher
- Born: May 18, 1996 (age 30); Bridgeton, Missouri, U.S.
- Bats: Left Throws: Left

MLB debut
- August 23, 2020, for the Tampa Bay Rays

MLB statistics (through April 6, 2026)
- Win–loss record: 20–14
- Earned run average: 4.86
- Strikeouts: 162
- Stats at Baseball Reference

Teams
- Tampa Bay Rays (2020–2023); Pittsburgh Pirates (2024); Toronto Blue Jays (2026)

Joshua Randol Fleming (born May 18, 1996) is an American professional baseball pitcher in the St. Louis Cardinals organization. He has previously played in Major League Baseball (MLB) for the Tampa Bay Rays, Pittsburgh Pirates, and Toronto Blue Jays.

== Amateur career ==
Fleming attended Columbia High School in Columbia, Illinois, where he pitched for the Eagles. He enrolled at Webster University, where he played college baseball.

== Professional career ==
=== Tampa Bay Rays ===
The Tampa Bay Rays selected Fleming in the fifth round of the 2017 MLB draft. He signed and made his debut with the Princeton Rays, that year. Fleming's 2017 stat line included a 5.40 earned run average (ERA) across 12 games (nine starts). In 2018, Fleming began the season with the Bowling Green Hot Rods, where he posted a 1.20 ERA over ten games. Fleming began pitching for the Charlotte Stone Crabs in July, achieving a record of 3–3 with a 4.11 ERA. In posting a 2019 season record that included a 3.31 ERA over 21 games, Fleming was named the MVP of the season by the Montgomery Biscuits . He finished the season with the Durham Bulls, compiling a 5.14 ERA across four games.

In July 2020, the Rays added Fleming to their 60-man roster. On August 21, after Rays starter Yonny Chirinos was ruled out for the rest of the 2020 season with a torn UCL, Kevin Cash announced Fleming would be called up to make his debut on August 23, against the Toronto Blue Jays. His contract was officially selected to the active roster on August 23. Fleming earned the win in his big league debut, pitching five innings with three strikeouts and two earned runs in a 5–4 Rays victory. He finished the season with a 5–0 record and a 2.78 ERA in 32 1/3 innings.

On July 7, 2021, Fleming combined with Collin McHugh, Diego Castillo, Matt Wisler, and Peter Fairbanks to no–hit the Cleveland Indians. However, since the feat was achieved in a truncated seven–inning doubleheader game, it was not recorded as an official no-hitter. Fleming made 26 appearances for the Rays in 2021, which included 11 starts. In 104 1/3 innings pitched, he logged a 10–8 record and 5.09 ERA with 65 strikeouts and 1 save. In 2022, Fleming made only 10 appearances (3 starts) for the Rays, missing time with an oblique injury. In 35.0 innings of work, he struggled to a 2–5 record and 6.43 ERA with 29 strikeouts.

In 2023, Fleming began the year with the Rays, pitching in 11 games before he was scratched from a scheduled start against the Boston Red Sox and placed on the injured list with elbow soreness on June 2. An MRI revealed cartilage buildup on his elbow bone as well as inflammation, and he was transferred to the 60–day injured list on June 10. He was activated on August 12. Following the season on November 4, Fleming was removed from the 40–man roster and sent outright to Triple–A Durham.

On November 6, 2023, Fleming was claimed off waivers by the Philadelphia Phillies. However, he was not tendered a contract for 2024 and became a free agent on November 17.

=== Pittsburgh Pirates ===
On February 14, 2024, Fleming signed a one-year contract with the Pittsburgh Pirates. In 17 games for Pittsburgh, he compiled a 5.68 ERA with 13 strikeouts across 19 innings pitched. On May 14, Fleming was designated for assignment by the Pirates. He cleared waivers and was sent outright to the Triple–A Indianapolis Indians on May 18. On June 14, the Pirates selected Fleming's contract, adding him back to the active roster. He was designated for assignment again on July 26. Fleming elected free agency on July 28.

=== Seattle Mariners ===
On August 6, 2024, Fleming signed a minor league contract with the Seattle Mariners organization. In 19 appearances for the Triple-A Tacoma Rainiers, he logged a 2–2 record and 4.50 ERA with 13 strikeouts across 16 innings pitched. Fleming elected free agency following the season on November 4.

On December 19, 2024, Fleming re-signed with the Mariners on a minor league contract that included an invitation to spring training. He was released by Seattle on June 15, 2025, but re-signed with the organization on a new minor league contract the following day. Fleming made 47 appearances (three starts) for Tacoma, with a 5–5 record and 4.91 ERA with 44 strikeouts and one save across 84 1/3 innings pitched. He elected free agency on November 6.

=== Toronto Blue Jays ===
On February 7, 2026, Fleming signed a minor league contract with the Toronto Blue Jays. He was assigned to the Triple-A Buffalo Bisons to begin the regular season. On April 6, the Blue Jays selected Fleming's contract, adding him to their active roster. He appeared in relief that night against the Los Angeles Dodgers, but allowed four runs on six hits with one strikeout over three innings of work. The following day, Fleming was designated for assignment by Toronto. He cleared waivers and elected free agency on April 9. On April 12, Fleming re-signed with the Blue Jays organization on a minor league contract. He made 13 appearances (12 starts) for Buffalo, compiling a 3–5 record and 3.08 ERA with 51 strikeouts across 64 1/3 innings pitched. Fleming was released by the Blue Jays organization on July 4.

=== Chicago Cubs ===
On July 8, 2026, Fleming signed a minor league contract with the Chicago Cubs. He made five appearances (including two starts) for the Triple–A Iowa Cubs, compiling a 1–1 record and 3.44 ERA with 13 strikeouts across 18 1/3 innings pitched. Fleming was released by the Cubs organization on August 17.

=== St. Louis Cardinals ===
On August 19, 2026, Fleming signed a minor league contract with the St. Louis Cardinals. In 6 starts with Triple-A Memphis Redbirds he threw 29.2 innings going 1-2 with a 6.37 ERA and 18 strikeouts.

On November 2, 2026, Fleming re-signed with the Cardinals on a new minor league contract for the 2027 season.

== Personal life ==
Fleming and his wife met at Webster University, where she played volleyball. They were married in St. Louis in November 2020.
