= Diego Castillo (pitcher) =

Dominican baseball player (born 1994)

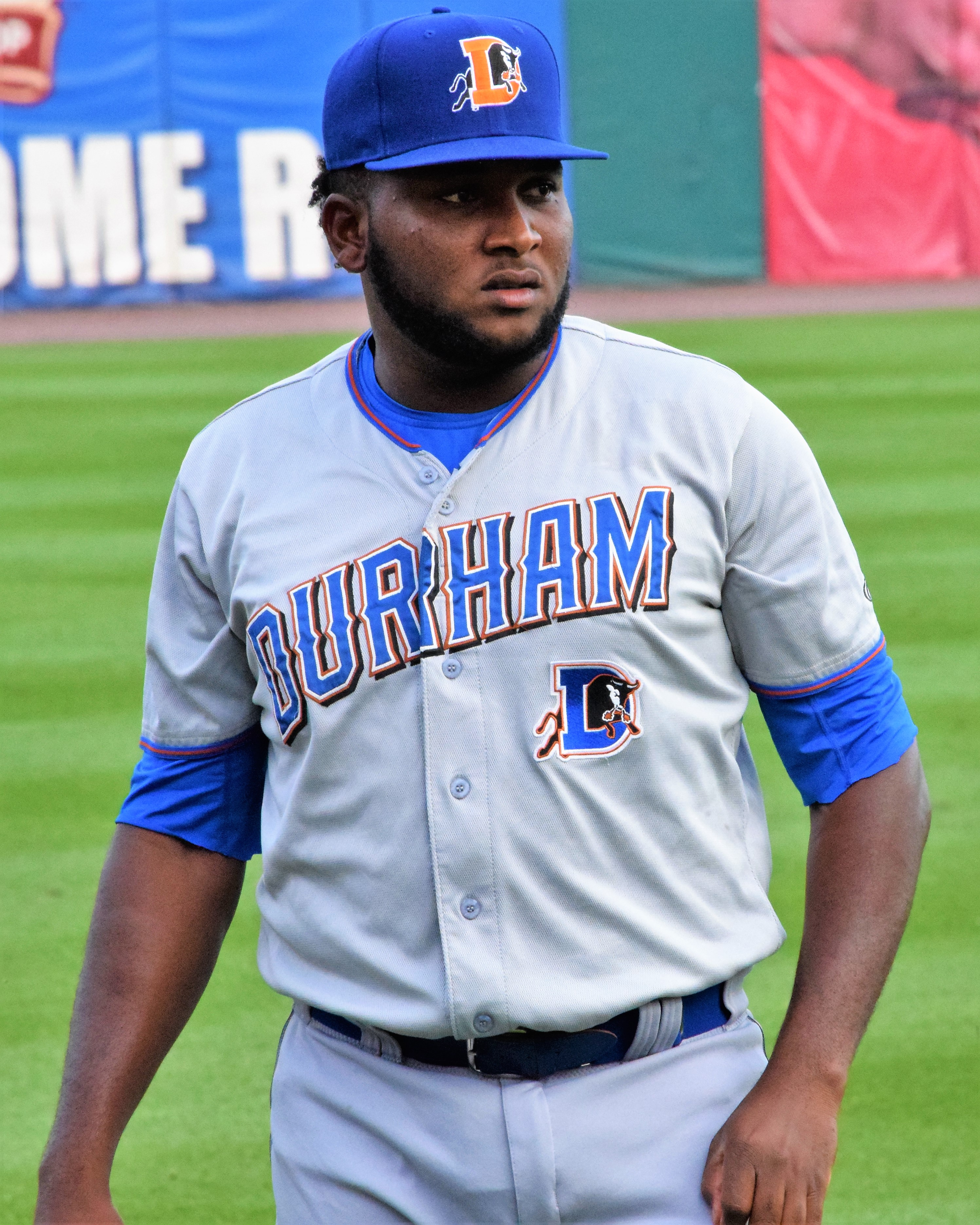
- Castillo with the Durham Bulls in 2017

Free agent
- Pitcher
- Born: January 18, 1994 (age 32); Cabrera, Dominican Republic
- Bats: Right Throws: Right

MLB debut
- June 6, 2018, for the Tampa Bay Rays

MLB statistics (through 2024 season)
- Win–loss record: 24–18
- Earned run average: 3.20
- Strikeouts: 310
- Saves: 35
- Stats at Baseball Reference

Teams
- Tampa Bay Rays (2018–2021); Seattle Mariners (2021–2023); Minnesota Twins (2024)

Diego Castillo (born January 18, 1994) is a Dominican professional baseball pitcher who is a free agent. He has previously played in Major League Baseball (MLB) for the Tampa Bay Rays, Seattle Mariners, and Minnesota Twins.

== Career ==
=== Tampa Bay Rays ===
==== Minor leagues ====
Castillo signed with the Tampa Bay Rays as an international free agent on March 5, 2014. He made his professional debut that season with the Dominican Summer League Rays and spent the whole season there, going 3–3 with a 3.96 ERA in 25 innings. In 2015, he played for both the Hudson Valley Renegades and Bowling Green Hot Rods, compiling a combined 1–2 record and 3.03 ERA in 18 relief appearances. In 2016, he pitched with both Bowling Green and the Charlotte Stone Crabs, posting a combined 3–6 record and 2.98 ERA in 60.1 total innings pitched out of the bullpen. In 2017, Castillo played for the Montgomery Biscuits and Durham Bulls. He was named the Rays' minor league reliever of the year after posting a 2.76 earned run average (ERA) with 90 strikeouts and 15 saves in 71.2 innings pitched. The Rays added him to their 40-man roster after the season. He began the 2018 season with the Durham Bulls.

==== Major leagues ====
Castillo was promoted to the Tampa Bay Rays and made his debut on June 6, 2018. For the season, he split time between the bullpen and being one of the Rays' "opening" starters. Castillo threw 56 2/3 innings over 43 games, going 4–2 over 11 starts. He finished the year with a 3.18 ERA, 65 strikeouts and 18 walks.

In 2019, Castillo was used as both a closer and opener. On June 23, he was put on the 10-day injured list with shoulder inflammation. He finished the season appearing in 65 games (6 starts). In 68 2/3 innings, he recorded 81 strikeouts, 8 saves, and an ERA of 3.41. In the postseason, Castillo threw 2 shutout innings in the American League Wild Card victory the Oakland Athletics. He threw 3 2/3 innings over three games (one start) in the American League Division Series, where the Rays lost to the Houston Astros in five games.

In 2020, Castillo was moved away from the opener role. On July 24, he went on paternity leave. Castillo collected 4 saves over 22 games, posting an ERA of 1.66 with 23 strikeouts and 11 walks. In the postseason, he was used in late innings consistently when the Rays had the lead. He pitched the final two innings of Game 5 of the ALDS against the New York Yankees, picking up the win after Mike Brosseau's 8th inning home run. In the American League Championship Series against the Astros, Castillo appeared in 7 games, going 1–0 with 2 saves and 2 holds. The first run he allowed was in Game 6.

On July 7, 2021, Castillo combined with Collin McHugh, Josh Fleming, Matt Wisler, and Peter Fairbanks to no–hit the Cleveland Indians. However, since the feat was achieved in a truncated seven–inning doubleheader game, it was not recorded as an official no-hitter.

=== Seattle Mariners ===
On July 29, 2021, the Rays traded Castillo to the Seattle Mariners for J. T. Chargois and Austin Shenton. He made 24 appearances for Seattle down the stretch, with a 3–1 record, 2 saves, 2.86 ERA, and 26 strikeouts in 22 innings pitched.

In 2022, Castillo made 59 appearances for Seattle, logging a 7–3 record, 7 saves, 3.64 ERA, and 53 strikeouts in 54 1/3 innings of work. He spent two weeks on the injured list with shoulder inflammation in late July and early August. He gave up no runs and two hits in three postseason games.

In 2023, Castillo struggled to a 6.23 ERA with 7 strikeouts in 8 appearances to begin the year. On May 1, he was removed from the 40-man roster and sent outright to the Triple-A Tacoma Rainiers. In 43 appearances for Tacoma, he went 5–5 with a 5.13 ERA and 50 strikeouts in 47 1/3 innings pitched. On October 9, Castillo elected free agency.

=== Minnesota Twins ===
On December 18, 2023, Castillo signed a minor league contract with the Texas Rangers. He was released by the Rangers organization on March 27, 2024.

On March 29, 2024, Castillo signed a minor league contract with the Minnesota Twins. In 18 games for the Triple–A St. Paul Saints, he recorded a 2.50 ERA with 22 strikeouts and 5 saves across 18 innings pitched. On May 28, the Twins selected Castillo's contract, adding him to their major league roster. He was designated for assignment following the promotion of Jay Jackson on June 12. Castillo elected free agency on June 16. On July 3, Castillo re–signed with the Twins on a minor league contract. He was selected back to the active roster on September 1. He was optioned to Triple-A St. Paul on September 4. In 7 total appearances for Minnesota, Castillo logged a 2.70 ERA with 6 strikeouts over 10 innings of work. He was designated for assignment by the Twins on September 29. Castillo elected free agency on October 4.

=== Colorado Rockies ===
On December 26, 2024, Castillo signed a minor league contract with the Colorado Rockies. In 20 appearances for the Triple-A Albuquerque Isotopes, he compiled a 3–2 record and 5.06 ERA with 23 strikeouts and two saves across 21 1/3 innings pitched. The Rockies released him on May 31, 2025.

=== Toros de Tijuana ===
On July 1, 2025, Castillo signed with the Toros de Tijuana of the Mexican League. In 17 relief appearances, he posted a 1–1 record with a 1.76 ERA, 21 strikeouts, and three saves across 15 1/3 innings of work. On April 14, 2026, Castillo was released by Tijuana.

== Personal life ==
Castillo has a daughter. Castillo is the youngest of 10 children. His mother began teaching him to cook when he was 10 years old. He has cooked for some of his teammates.
