= J. T. Chargois =

American baseball player (born 1990)

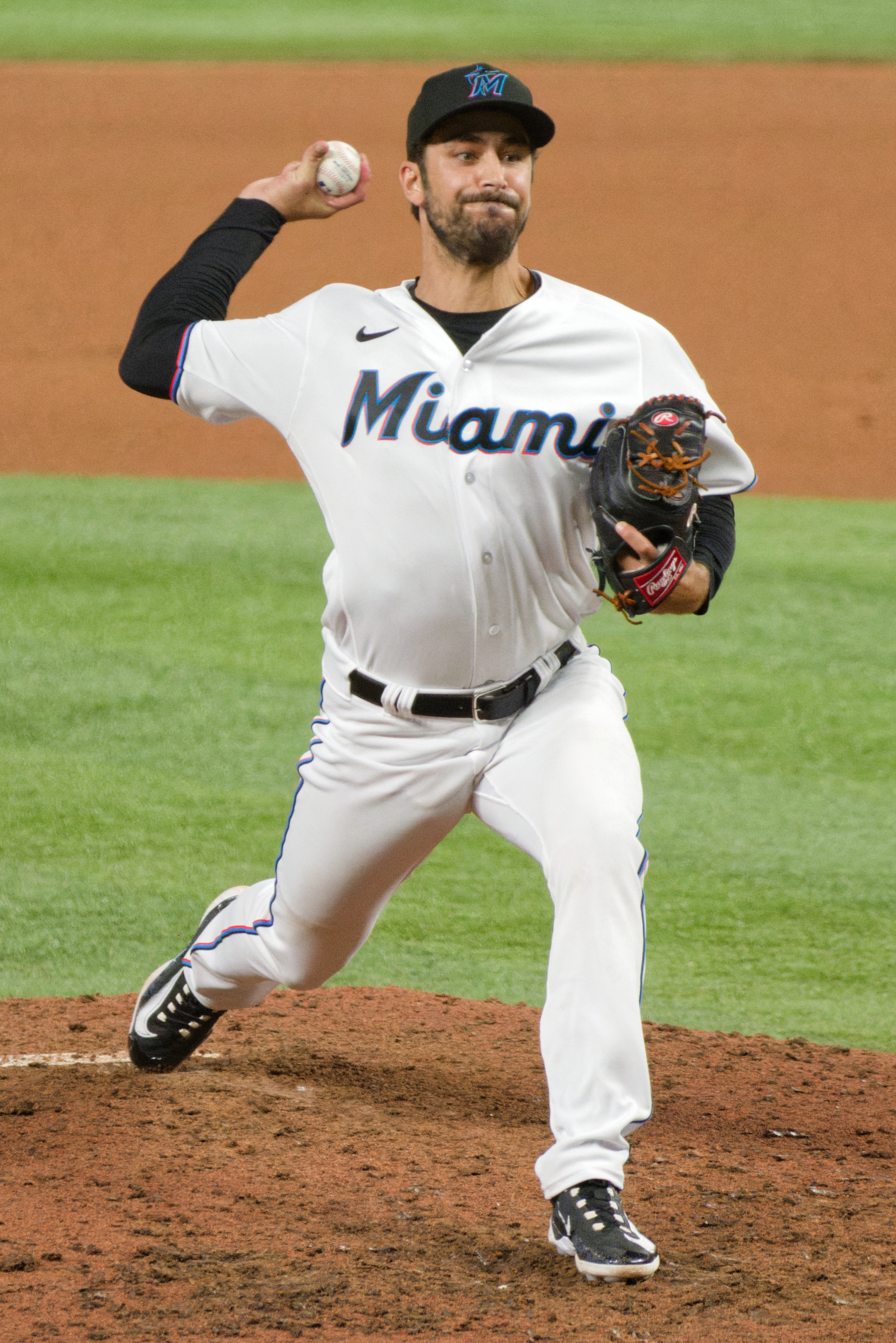
- Chargois with the Marlins in 2023

Free agent
- Pitcher
- Born: December 3, 1990 (age 35); Sulphur, Louisiana, U.S.
- Bats: Switch Throws: Right

Professional debut
- MLB: June 11, 2016, for the Minnesota Twins
- NPB: June 19, 2020, for the Tohoku Rakuten Golden Eagles

MLB statistics (through 2024 season)
- Win–loss record: 16–7
- Earned run average: 3.35
- Strikeouts: 220

NPB statistics (through 2020 season)
- Win–loss record: 0–3
- Earned run average: 5.81
- Strikeouts: 19
- Stats at Baseball Reference

Teams
- Minnesota Twins (2016); Los Angeles Dodgers (2018–2019); Tohoku Rakuten Golden Eagles (2020); Seattle Mariners (2021); Tampa Bay Rays (2021–2022); Miami Marlins (2023–2024); Seattle Mariners (2024)

Jon Thomas Chargois (/ʃɑːrˈɡwɑː/ SHA-gwah; born December 3, 1990) is an American professional baseball pitcher who is a free agent. He has previously played in Major League Baseball (MLB) for the Minnesota Twins, Los Angeles Dodgers, Seattle Mariners, Tampa Bay Rays, and Miami Marlins, and in Nippon Professional Baseball (NPB) for the Tohoku Rakuten Golden Eagles.

== Career ==
=== Amateur career ===
Chargois attended Sulphur High School in Sulphur, Louisiana. He was named to the All-State team in 2009, his senior year, after batting .393 with 12 home runs and pitching with a 1.02 earned run average (ERA). He then enrolled at Rice University to play college baseball for the Rice Owls baseball team as a first baseman and pitcher. In 2010, Chargois played collegiate summer baseball with the Fairbanks Goldpanners in the Alaska Baseball League and played in the Midnight Sun Game. He changed summer leagues in 2011, serving as the closer for the Brewster Whitecaps of the Cape Cod Baseball League, being named a league all-star. In 2012, his junior year, he had a 4–1 win–loss record with a 2.15 earned run average (ERA) in 37 2/3 relief innings pitched along with batting .323 in 51 games, being named to the first-team All-Conference USA.

=== Minnesota Twins ===
The Minnesota Twins selected Chargois in the second round, with the 72nd overall selection of the 2012 MLB draft. He signed with the Twins, receiving a $712,600 signing bonus. Converted to a full-time pitcher, he appeared in 12 games in the summer of 2012 for the Elizabethton Twins of the Rookie-level Appalachian League, pitching to a 1.69 ERA, and recording five saves in 16 innings. He underwent Tommy John surgery in 2013. After missing the 2013 and 2014 season recovering from surgery, he pitched for the Twins in an instructional league after the 2014 season.

Chargois opened 2015 closing for the Fort Myers Miracle of the High-A Florida State League. After pitching to a 1–0 record with 4 saves and a 2.40 ERA in 15 innings pitched, the Twins promoted Chargois to the Chattanooga Lookouts of the Double-A Southern League in late May, where he finished the season with a 1–1 record, 11 saves, and a 2.73 ERA in 32 appearances. After the 2015 season, the Twins added Chargois to their 40-man roster. He began the 2016 season in Chattanooga, and after compiling a 1.54 ERA through 11 2/3 innings, received a promotion to the Rochester Red Wings of the Triple–A International League in May.

On June 10, the Twins promoted Chargois to the major leagues. He made his MLB debut the following day against the Boston Red Sox, allowing five earned runs in 2/3 of an inning. The Twins returned him to Rochester following the game. Chargois appeared in the 2016 All-Star Futures Game and was called back up to the majors on August 10. He pitched in 25 games for the Twins in 2016, with a 1–1 record and 4.70 ERA in 23 innings pitched. His first major league win was on September 10 against the Cleveland Indians, when he pitched a scoreless 12th inning.

In 2017, Chargois was optioned to Rochester before the season began, ticketed to be the team's closer After pitching twice for Rochester, Chargois went on the disabled list with an elbow injury. He missed the rest of the season while recovering from the stress reaction injury. On February 14, 2018, the Twins waived Chargois, removing him from their roster while hoping another team would not claim him.

=== Los Angeles Dodgers ===
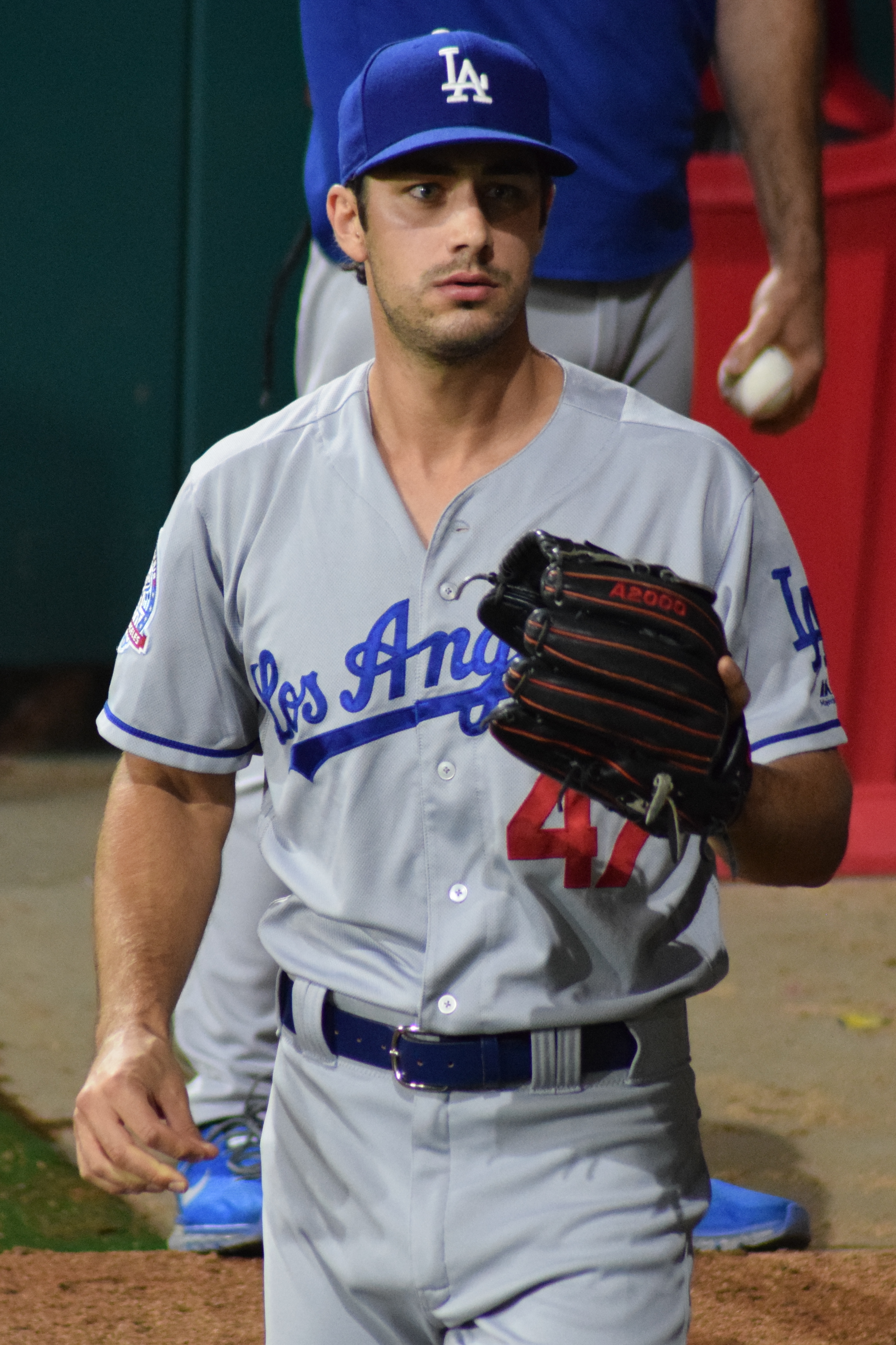
Chargois with the Dodgers in 2018

Chargois was claimed off waivers by the Los Angeles Dodgers on February 23, 2018. He immediately changed to a less violent pitching delivery to protect his elbow. He split both 2018 and 2019 between the Triple-A Oklahoma City Dodgers and Los Angeles. In 2018, he was on the Dodgers roster from Opening Day before being sent down for a month in late May. He was placed on the injured list with nerve irritation on August 21, returning to pitch in the team's final regular season game. In two years with the Dodgers, he was 3–4 with a 4.53 ERA in 60 games, not pitching in the postseason. Chargois was released by the Dodgers on December 28, 2019, to allow him to pitch in Japan.

=== Tohoku Rakuten Golden Eagles ===
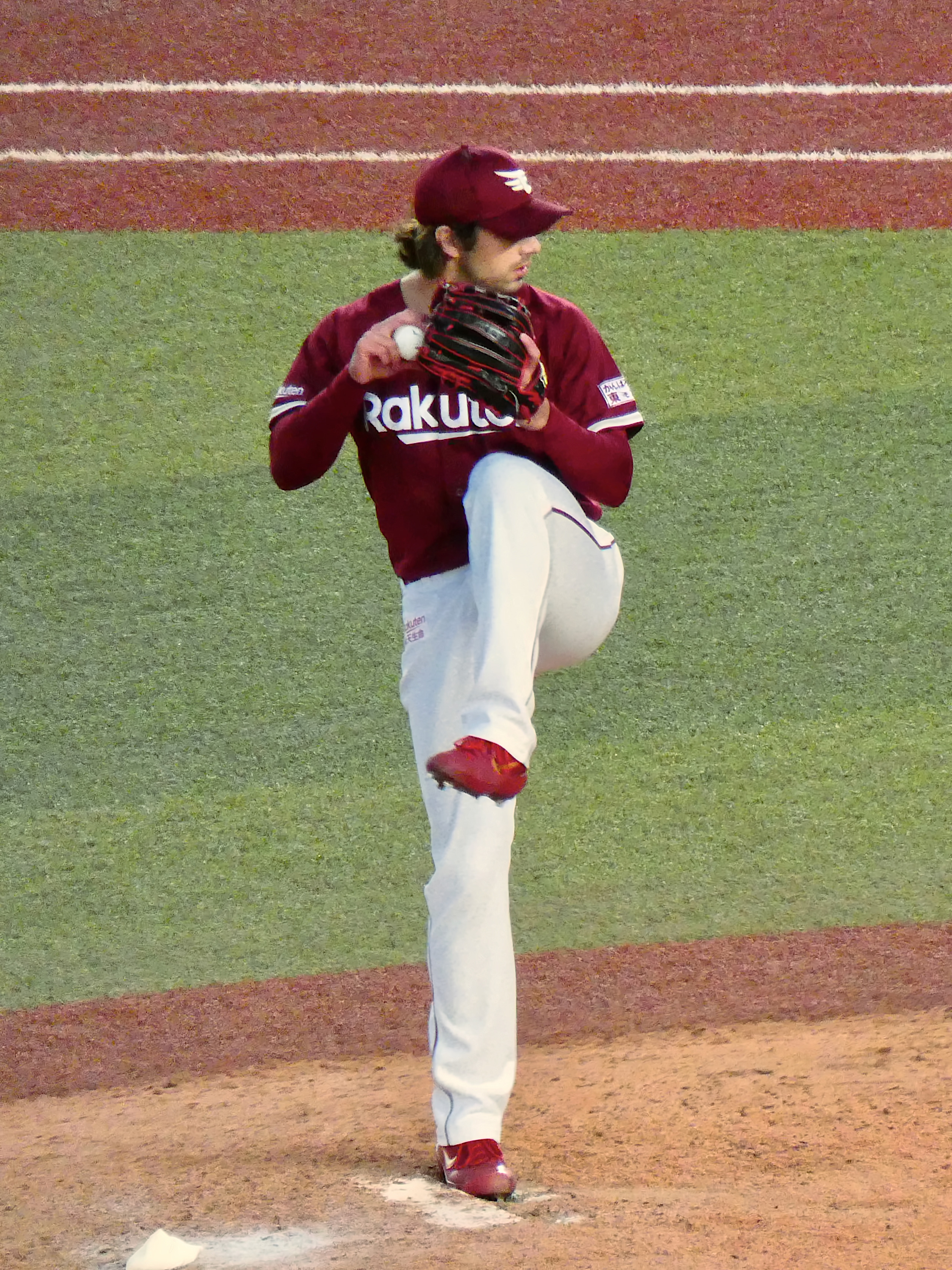
Chargois with the Golden Eagles in 2020

On January 9, 2020, Chargois signed with the Tohoku Rakuten Golden Eagles of the Nippon Professional Baseball (NPB). He recorded an 0–3 record and 5.81 ERA with 19 strikeouts in 2020 with the Eagles. On December 2, Chargois became a free agent.

=== Seattle Mariners ===
On February 9, 2021, Chargois signed a minor league contract with the Seattle Mariners that included a spring training invitation. Chargois joined the Mariners roster on May 9. He later credited Mariners coaches Pete Woodworth and Trent Blank with improving how he pitched. He began throwing his slider, always his secondary pitch, more frequently. He had a 3.00 ERA and 29 strikeouts in 30 innings less than three months with the Mariners.

=== Tampa Bay Rays ===
On July 29, 2021, the Mariners traded Chargois and minor league infielder Austin Shenton to the Tampa Bay Rays for reliever Diego Castillo. Chargois made 25 appearances for the Rays to close out the year, registering a 5–1 record and 1.90 ERA with 24 strikeouts in 23 2/3 innings pitched. His combined 56 games pitched with the Mariners and Rays in 2021 was a career high. He made his postseason debut, pitching in all four games in the Rays' American League Division Series loss to the Red Sox.

After pitching on Opening Day in 2022, Chargois went on the 10-day injured list with an oblique muscle injury that had bothered him in spring training. On May 22, he was moved to the 60-day injured list after aggravating his oblique in a rehab appearance with the Durham Bulls. He was activated off of the injured list on August 23. In 21 games with the Rays in 2022, Chargois had a 2.42 ERA.

=== Miami Marlins ===
On November 15, 2022, Chargois was traded to the Miami Marlins along with Xavier Edwards for pitching prospects Marcus Johnson and Santiago Suarez. Chargois made 46 appearances for the Marlins in 2023, tallying a 3.61 ERA with 35 strikeouts across 42 1/3 innings pitched. Another oblique strain kept him out of action from April 10 to May 16, followed by a rib cage injury that sent him to the injured list for 20 days in August.

Chargois was placed on the injured list with neck spasms to begin the 2024 season. After suffering a setback in his recovery in late April, he was transferred to the 60-day injured list on May 12. Chargois was activated from the injured list on June 12. In 15 outings, he had a 1.62 ERA with 12 strikeouts in 16 2/3 innings.

=== Seattle Mariners (second stint) ===
On July 30, 2024, the Marlins traded Chargois to the Seattle Mariners in exchange for pitcher Will Schomberg. He closed out 2024 with a 2–1 record, two blown saves, and a 2.75 ERA in 21 games with the Mariners. Chargois was designated for assignment by Seattle on November 19. The Mariners non-tendered Chargois on November 22, making him a free agent.

=== Texas Rangers ===
On February 12, 2025, Chargois signed a minor league contract with the Texas Rangers. In 5 appearances for the Triple-A Round Rock Express, he struggled to an 0–1 record and 19.29 ERA with 7 strikeouts across 4 2/3 innings pitched. Chargois was released by the Rangers organization on April 15.

== Personal life ==
Chargois is married.
