= Collin McHugh =

American baseball player (born 1987)

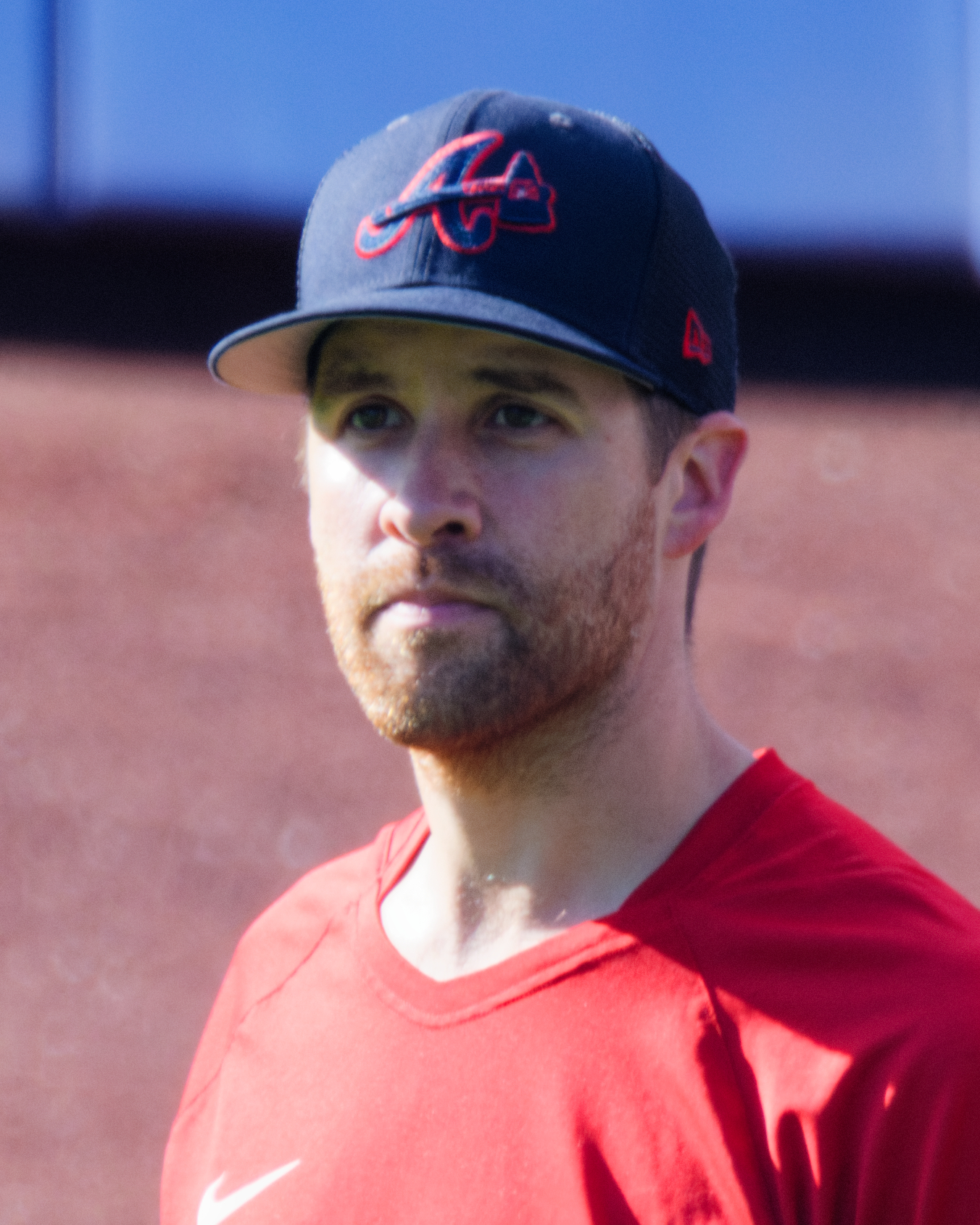
- McHugh with the Atlanta Braves in 2022
- Pitcher
- Born: June 19, 1987 (age 39); Naperville, Illinois, U.S.
- Batted: Right Threw: Right

MLB debut
- August 23, 2012, for the New York Mets

Last MLB appearance
- September 5, 2023, for the Atlanta Braves

MLB statistics
- Win–loss record: 71–47
- Earned run average: 3.72
- Strikeouts: 967
- Stats at Baseball Reference

Teams
- New York Mets (2012–2013); Colorado Rockies (2013); Houston Astros (2014–2019); Tampa Bay Rays (2021); Atlanta Braves (2022–2023)

Career highlights and awards
- World Series champion (2017)

Collin Alexander McHugh (born June 19, 1987) is an American former professional baseball pitcher. He played in Major League Baseball (MLB) for the New York Mets, Colorado Rockies, Houston Astros, Tampa Bay Rays and Atlanta Braves. Listed at 6 feet 2 inches (1.88 m) and 191 pounds (87 kg), he throws and bats right-handed.

== Amateur career ==
Born in Naperville, Illinois, McHugh graduated from Providence Christian Academy in Lilburn, Georgia, and attended Berry College. In 2007, he played collegiate summer baseball in the Cape Cod Baseball League for the Chatham A's and the Wareham Gatemen. He was drafted by the New York Mets in the 18th round of the 2008 Major League Baseball draft.

== Professional career ==
=== New York Mets ===
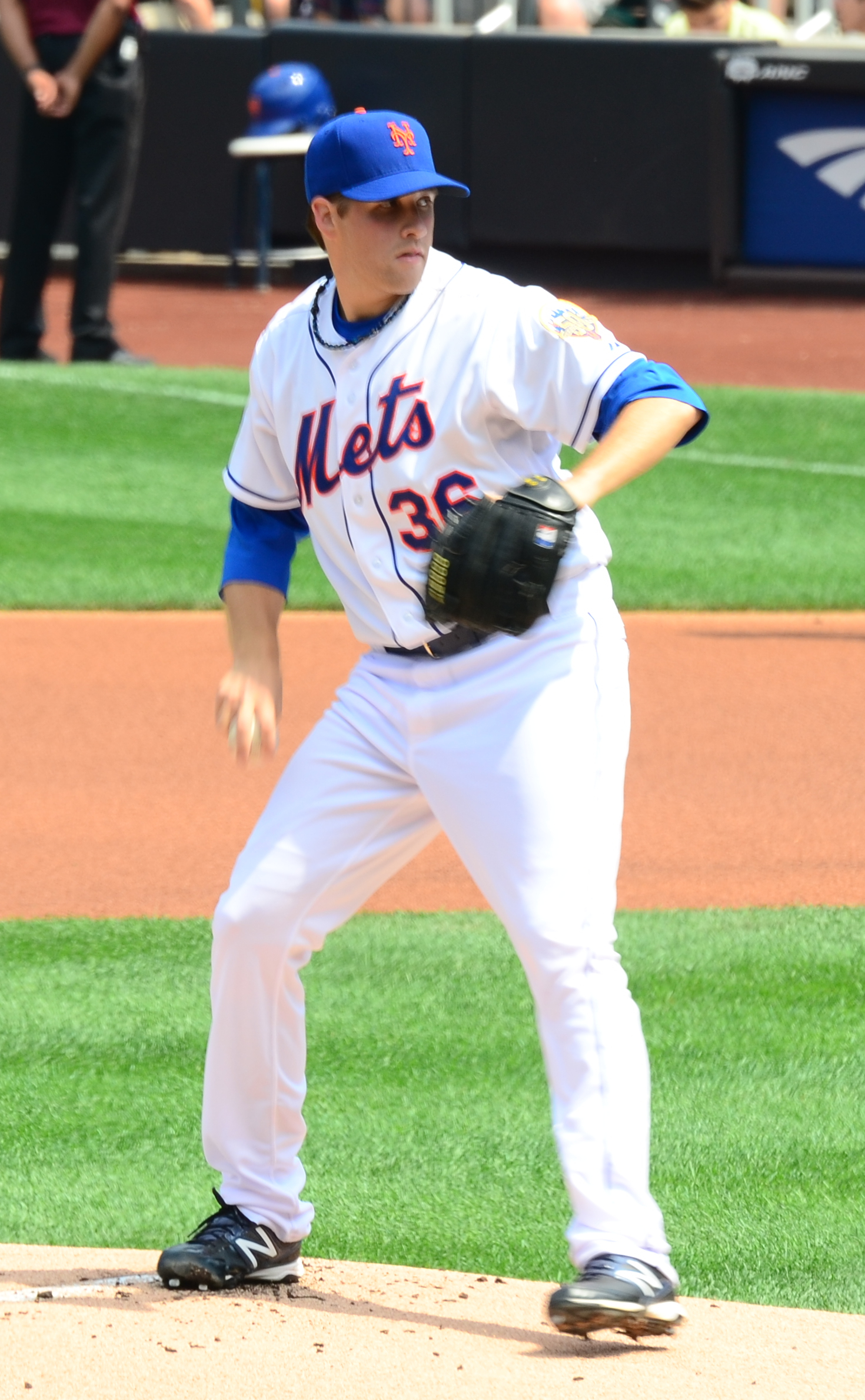
McHugh pitching for the New York Mets in 2012

McHugh was called up to the major leagues on August 22, 2012, and he made his MLB debut on August 23 against the Colorado Rockies at Citi Field. He pitched seven scoreless innings and got nine strikeouts while surrendering two hits and a walk. Despite his performance, the Mets lost, 1–0. McHugh made two more starts before being demoted on August 24 to make room on the roster for Jeremy Hefner. Overall with the 2012 Mets, he appeared in eight games (four starts) compiling an 0–4 record with a 7.59 ERA. During 2013, McHugh made three appearances (one start) with the Mets; he had a 10.29 ERA and an 0–1 record.

=== Colorado Rockies ===
The Mets traded McHugh to the Colorado Rockies for outfielder Eric Young Jr. on June 18, 2013. McHugh appeared in four games (all starts) for the 2013 Rockies, registering an 0–3 record with 9.95 ERA. He was designated for assignment on December 16, 2013.

=== Houston Astros ===
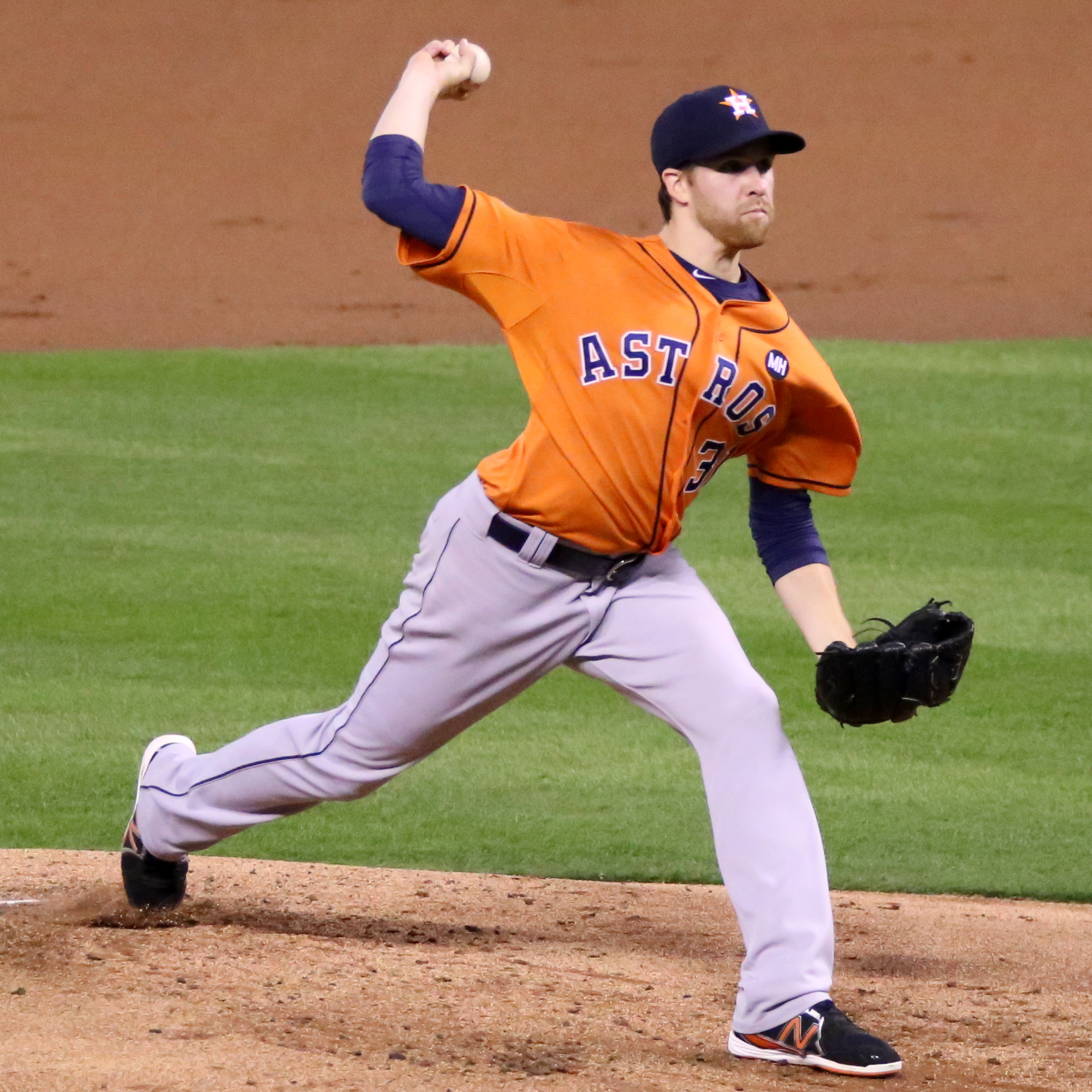
McHugh pitching for the Astros in 2015

On December 18, 2013, McHugh was claimed off waivers by the Houston Astros. In 2014, he finished with 11 wins and led the team in ERA, with a 2.73 mark.

In 2015, McHugh set a number of career highs, including a second-place finish in the American League (AL) in wins with 19, behind teammate Dallas Keuchel's 20. Hence, McHugh and Keuchel became the first Astros teammate duo to reach at least 19 wins each since Mike Hampton (22–4) and José Lima (21–10) did so in 1999. He was seventh in the AL in games started (32) and batters faced (859), while his 31 assists ranked second at his position. He also posted 203 1/3 innings, 3.89 ERA and 171 strikeouts. The Astros made the postseason, and McHugh started and won Game 1 of the American League Division Series (ALDS) versus the Kansas City Royals.

In 2016, McHugh reached more career-highs with 33 starts and 177 strikeouts, finishing 13–10 W–L with an ERA of 4.34 in 184 2/3 innings. He was recognized by the Houston chapter of the Baseball Writers' Association of America (BBWAA) in 2016 as the recipient of the Darryl Kile Good Guy Award.

McHugh began the 2017 season on the 10-day disabled list (DL) due to tendonitis in his right shoulder. On April 6, 2017, he left a game while on rehab assignment with the Triple-A Fresno Grizzlies after feeling tightness in his elbow and biceps. With posterior impingement in his right elbow, McHugh was ruled out for an extended period of time. He was limited to just 12 starts. He appeared in two games of the postseason, pitching a combined total of six innings, allowing a total of one hit and three runs. The Astros won the 2017 World Series. Three years later, the Houston Astros sign stealing scandal broke, in which it was revealed that the Astros had cheated during their championship season. McHugh said that he knew about the sign stealing scheme and expressed remorse for going along with it.

McHugh made the transition to a relief role in 2018, appearing in 58 games. He finished with an ERA of 1.99 in 72 1/3 innings, striking out 94. In 2018, he had the third-lowest swing rate for his in-strike-zone sliders of any pitcher in baseball (43.9%), behind only Aroldis Chapman (42.5%) and Robert Stock (43.1%).

McHugh began the 2019 season as a starting pitcher for the Astros, a job he secured in spring training. He was demoted to the bullpen on May 11, 2019, after eight starts. At the time of his demotion, he had registered an ERA of 6.37 in 41 innings. Overall with the 2019 Astros, McHugh appeared in 35 games (8 starts) while recording 82 strikeouts in 74 2/3 innings with a 4.70 ERA and a 4–5 record. On October 31, 2019, McHugh elected to become a free agent.

=== Boston Red Sox ===
On March 5, 2020, McHugh signed a one-year contract with the Boston Red Sox. On July 19, the team announced that he would not play during the start-delayed 2020 season, noting that McHugh's "elbow was not responding as he had hoped" following a non-surgical procedure during the offseason. He was added to the team's restricted list on July 23. On October 28, McHugh elected free agency.

=== Tampa Bay Rays ===
On February 21, 2021, McHugh signed a one-year, $1.8 million contract with the Tampa Bay Rays. On July 7, McHugh combined with Josh Fleming, Diego Castillo, Matt Wisler, and Peter Fairbanks to no–hit the Cleveland Indians. However, since the feat was achieved in a truncated seven–inning doubleheader game, it was not recorded as an official no-hitter.

=== Atlanta Braves ===
On March 15, 2022, McHugh signed a two-year contract worth $10 million with the Atlanta Braves. The deal includes a $6 million club option for 2024 and a $1 million buyout. Following the 2023 season, the Braves declined McHugh's option.

On January 22, 2024, McHugh announced his retirement from baseball.

== International career ==
On October 29, 2018, McHugh was selected as a member of the MLB All-Stars for the 2018 MLB Japan All-Star Series.

== Personal life ==
McHugh was married in 2009. In 2022, the couple separated and McHugh filed for divorce. In 2019, McHugh started a podcast called "The Twelve Six Podcast" where he interviewed other MLB players to bring out the human side of baseball.

== See also ==
- Houston Astros award winners and league leaders
