= Matt Wisler =

American baseball player (born 1992)

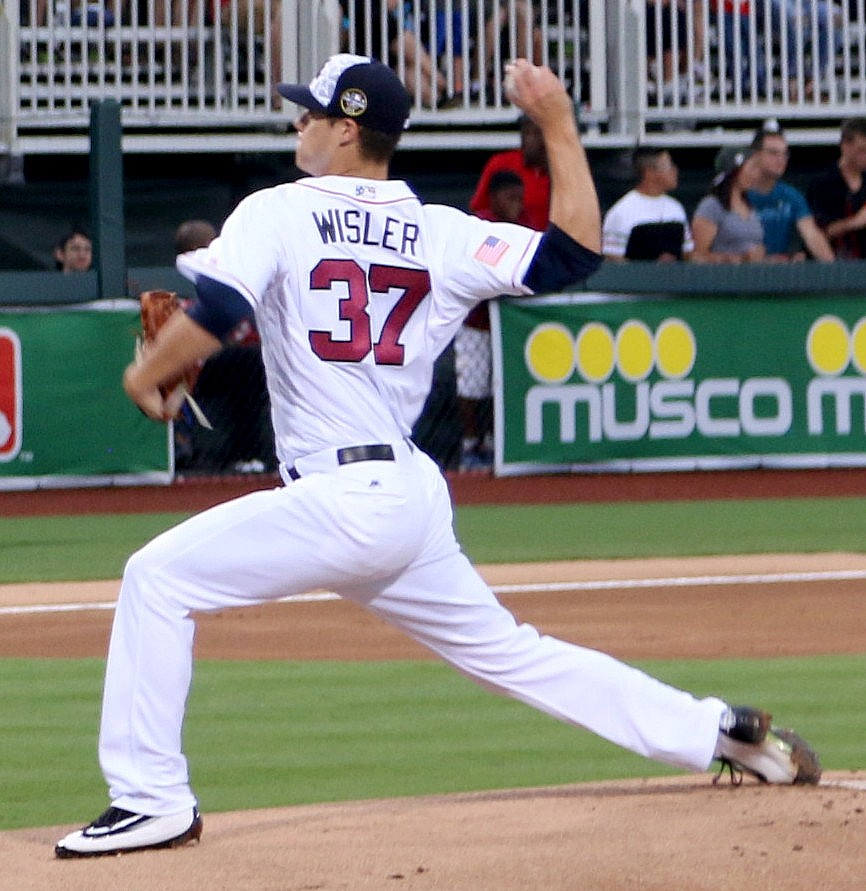
- Wisler pitching in the Fort Bragg Game in 2016
- Pitcher
- Born: September 12, 1992 (age 34); Bryan, Ohio, U.S.
- Batted: Right Threw: Right

MLB debut
- June 19, 2015, for the Atlanta Braves

Last MLB appearance
- September 4, 2022, for the Tampa Bay Rays

MLB statistics
- Win–loss record: 25–36
- Earned run average: 4.59
- Strikeouts: 436
- Stats at Baseball Reference

Teams
- Atlanta Braves (2015–2018); Cincinnati Reds (2018); San Diego Padres (2019); Seattle Mariners (2019); Minnesota Twins (2020); San Francisco Giants (2021); Tampa Bay Rays (2021–2022)

Matthew Robert Wisler (born September 12, 1992) is an American former professional baseball pitcher. He was drafted by the San Diego Padres out of high school in the seventh round of the 2011 Major League Baseball draft. He played in Major League Baseball (MLB) for the Atlanta Braves, Cincinnati Reds, San Diego Padres, Seattle Mariners, Minnesota Twins, San Francisco Giants, and Tampa Bay Rays.

== Early life ==
Wisler was born in Bryan, Ohio, and is one of three children of Bob and Sue Wisler.

He attended Bryan High School in his hometown. In his senior season, Wisler pitched to a 6–1 record, recording a 0.17 ERA and striking out 71 hitters over 42 innings, while allowing 13 hits and seven walks. He signed a national letter of intent to play college baseball with the Ohio State Buckeyes, but chose to sign with the Padres.

== Career ==
=== San Diego Padres ===
Wisler was drafted by the San Diego Padres in the seventh round of the 2011 Major League Baseball draft.

In 2012, pitching for the Fort Wayne TinCaps, Wisler went 5–4 with a 2.53 earned run average and 113 strikeouts in 114 innings pitched. He started 2013 with High-A Lake Elsinore, going 2–1 with a 2.03 ERA with 28 strikeouts in 31 innings. He was promoted to the Double-A San Antonio Missions on May 6, 2013.

The Padres invited Wisler to spring training in 2014, but he did not make the team. Wisler split the 2014 season between the Double A and Triple A levels, recording a 4.42 ERA, and 10–5 record, along with 136 strikeouts over 146 2/3 innings pitched with the Missions and El Paso Chihuahuas (giving up 21 home runs in 146.2 innings). In 2015, Wisler was again invited to spring training.

=== Atlanta Braves ===
On April 5, 2015, he was traded to the Atlanta Braves, along with Carlos Quentin, Cameron Maybin, Jordan Paroubeck, and the 41st overall draft pick, in exchange for Craig Kimbrel and Melvin Upton, Jr. He was then sent to Triple-A Gwinnett. On June 19, Wisler was called up to the major leagues, and that night he made his major league debut as the starting pitcher against the New York Mets. He pitched eight innings to pick up the win, the first time a Braves pitcher had accomplished that in his debut since John Smoltz's debut performance. Wisler recorded a 9.49 ERA from August 1 to September 3, and was demoted to the bullpen. Fellow rookie pitchers Manny Banuelos and Mike Foltynewicz suffered injuries later that month, and Wisler was reinserted into the starting rotation. He started another five games to finish the season, and compiled a 2.33 ERA during that period. In Wisler's final start of the year, he pitched 8 2/3 innings of a 2–0 win against the St. Louis Cardinals. In 2015, he was 8–8 with a 4.71 ERA in 20 games (19 starts).

Wisler began the 2016 season third in the Braves starting rotation, making his season debut on April 8 against the Cardinals. On April 17, Wisler recorded his first major league save, helping the Braves secure a sweep of the Miami Marlins. He pitched effectively as a starter until May, recording a 3.16 ERA in ten starts. In his following ten starts, Wisler pitched to a 7.71 ERA and allowed 16 home runs. His batting average against also rose, and as a result, the Braves demoted Wisler to Gwinnett on July 28. The team announced on August 24 that Wisler would be recalled the next day to start against the Marlins. He pitched well against the Arizona Diamondbacks and San Diego Padres, and left the latter start with a strained oblique. In 2016, at Triple-A Gwinnett he was 2–1 with a 3.71 ERA, and in the major leagues he was 7–13 in 27 games (26 starts) with a 5.00 ERA (giving up 26 home runs in 156.2 innings). In the offseason, Wisler pitched two games in the Dominican Winter League for Tigres del Licey.

Wisler was called up for the first time during the 2017 season on April 23. In 2017, he was 0–1 with an ERA of 8.35. He appeared in 7 games for the team in 2018, logging a 1–1 record and 5.40 ERA.

=== Cincinnati Reds ===
On July 30, 2018, the Braves traded Wisler, Lucas Sims, and Preston Tucker to the Cincinnati Reds in exchange for Adam Duvall. In 11 appearances for Cincinnati, he posted a 2.03 ERA. He was designated for assignment on March 28, 2019, after Derek Dietrich and José Iglesias had their contracts selected.

=== San Diego Padres (second stint) ===
On April 1, 2019, the Reds traded Wisler to the Padres for Diomar López. Wisler was designated for assignment on June 29. In 21 relief appearances for the Padres, Wisler was 2–2 with an ERA of 5.28 in 29 innings.

=== Seattle Mariners ===
On July 4, 2019, Wisler was traded to the Seattle Mariners in exchange for cash considerations. In 23 games (8 starts) he was 1–2 with a 6.04 ERA, and 6 walks and 29 strikeouts in 22.1 innings.

=== Minnesota Twins ===
On October 29, 2019, Wisler was claimed off waivers by the Minnesota Twins. In 18 games (4 starts) during the 2020 season, Wisler had an ERA of 1.07 in 25 1/3 innings, while striking out 35 batters, a career-high 12.4 strikeouts per 9 innings. Despite his solid performance that year, Wisler was non-tendered by the Twins on December 2.

=== San Francisco Giants ===
Wisler signed a one-year deal with the San Francisco Giants on December 8, 2020. After struggling to a 6.05 ERA in 21 appearances for the Giants, Wisler was designated for assignment on June 9, 2021.

=== Tampa Bay Rays ===
On June 11, 2021, Wisler was traded to the Tampa Bay Rays in exchange for minor league pitcher Michael Plassmeyer. On July 7, Wisler combined with Collin McHugh, Josh Fleming, Diego Castillo, and Peter Fairbanks to no–hit the Cleveland Indians. However, since the feat was achieved in a truncated seven–inning doubleheader game, it was not recorded as an official no-hitter. Wisler appeared in 27 games for Tampa Bay down the stretch, pitching to a 2–3 record and 2.15 ERA with 36 strikeouts in 29.1 innings of work.

In 2022, Wisler made 39 appearances out of the bullpen for the Rays. He posted a 3–3 record and 2.86 ERA with 34 strikeouts and 14 walks, before missing significant time from July to September with a neck injury. Wisler was designated for assignment on September 5, 2022. He rejected an outright assignment on September 7 and became a free agent.

=== Detroit Tigers ===
On February 13, 2023, Wisler signed a minor league contract with the Detroit Tigers organization. In 39 appearances for the Triple–A Toledo Mud Hens, he posted a 5–2 record and 4.40 ERA with 53 strikeouts and 2 saves in 47.0 innings of work. On August 5, Wisler was released by the Tigers.

=== Toronto Blue Jays ===
On August 12, 2023, Wisler signed a minor league contract with the Toronto Blue Jays. In 15 appearances out of the bullpen for the Triple–A Buffalo Bisons, he recorded a 5.17 ERA with 20 strikeouts across 15 2/3 innings of work. Wisler elected free agency following the season on November 6.

On March 17, 2024, Wisler announced his retirement from professional baseball via an Instagram post.

== Pitching style ==
While in the minor leagues, Wisler was known for his changeup. However, during his rookie year with the Braves, he began pairing his fastball with a slider instead, throwing his changeup on only 8.5% of pitches.

== Personal life ==
Wisler and his wife, Madie, married On November 9, 2019, in Atlanta.
