= Pete Fairbanks =

American baseball player (born 1993)

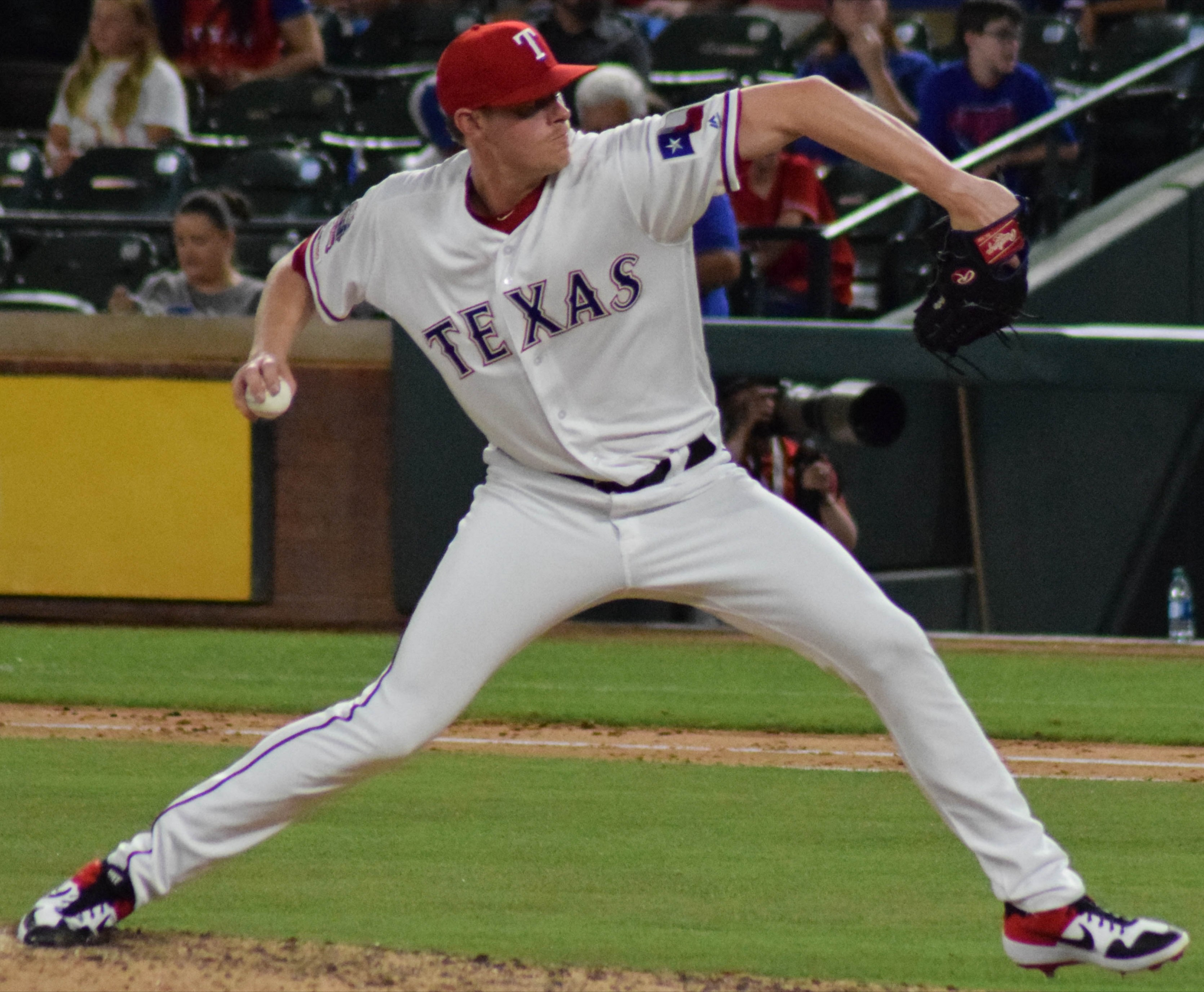
- Fairbanks with the Texas Rangers in 2019

Free agent
- Pitcher
- Born: December 16, 1993 (age 32); Milwaukee, Wisconsin, U.S.
- Bats: Right Throws: Right

MLB debut
- June 9, 2019, for the Texas Rangers

MLB statistics (through 2026 season)
- Win–loss record: 24–29
- Earned run average: 3.61
- Strikeouts: 389
- Saves: 109
- Stats at Baseball Reference

Teams
- Texas Rangers (2019); Tampa Bay Rays (2019–2025); Miami Marlins (2026)

Peter Anderson Fairbanks (born December 16, 1993) is an American professional baseball pitcher who is a free agent. He has played in Major League Baseball (MLB) for the Texas Rangers, Tampa Bay Rays, and Miami Marlins. Fairbanks was drafted by the Rangers in the ninth round of the 2015 MLB draft. He debuted in MLB for the Rangers in 2019 but was traded to the Rays later that season.

== Amateur career ==
Fairbanks attended Webster Groves High School in Webster Groves, Missouri. He underwent Tommy John surgery during his junior year of high school. Fairbanks attended the University of Missouri and played college baseball for the Tigers from 2013 through 2015. During his college years, he pitched for the Hyannis Harbor Hawks of the Cape Cod Baseball League in the summers of 2013 and 2014.

== Professional career ==
=== Texas Rangers ===
Fairbanks was selected by the Texas Rangers in the ninth round, 258th overall, of the 2015 MLB draft. He spent his debut season of 2015 with the Spokane Indians of the Low-A Northwest League, going 1–2 with a 3.14 ERA over 57 innings. He spent the 2016 season with the Hickory Crawdads of the Single-A South Atlantic League, going 4–5 with a 4.88 ERA in 101 innings. He opened the 2017 season with the Down East Wood Ducks of the High-A Carolina League, going 2–1 with a 5.79 ERA in 18 2/3 innings. Fairbanks suffered a second torn UCL and underwent Tommy John surgery a second time during the 2017 season. The injury caused him to miss the rest of the season as well as the entire 2018 season. Fairbanks returned to action in 2019 as a relief pitcher, being assigned to Down East to open the season. He went 1–0 with a 2.92 ERA with 15 strikeouts in 12 innings for them. On May 9, he was promoted to the Frisco RoughRiders of the Texas League. He went 1–0 with a 0.00 ERA and 14 strikeouts in 7 innings for them. On May 29, he was promoted to the Nashville Sounds of the Triple-A Pacific Coast League.

On June 8, Fairbanks' contract was selected and he was promoted to the major leagues for the first time. He made his major league debut on June 9, recording three strikeouts over two scoreless innings of relief.

=== Tampa Bay Rays ===
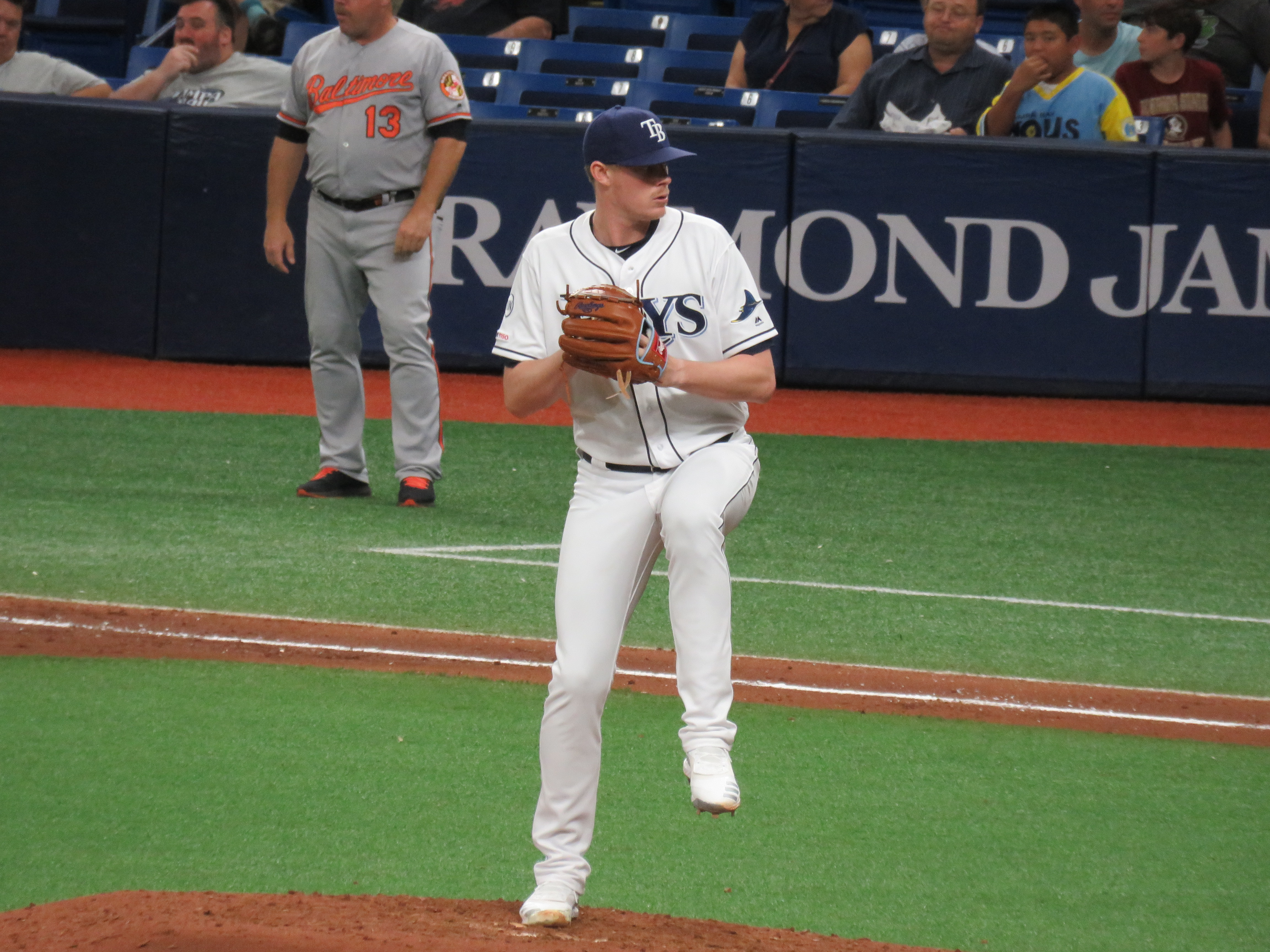
Fairbanks with the Rays in 2019

On June 29, 2019, Fairbanks pitched against the Tampa Bay Rays at Tropicana Field and caught the attention of the Rays' front office. On July 13, the Rangers traded Fairbanks to the Rays in exchange for Nick Solak. After the trade, he was assigned to the Triple-A Durham Bulls. Fairbanks finished the 2019 season going 2–3 with a 6.86 ERA over 21 MLB innings.

In 2020, Fairbanks threw in 27 games of the 60-game season. He posted an ERA of 2.70, recording 39 strikeouts in 26 2/3 innings. In Game 7 of the Championship Series against the Houston Astros, Fairbanks recorded a four-out save as the Rays won the American League pennant.

On July 7, 2021, Fairbanks combined with Collin McHugh, Josh Fleming, Diego Castillo, and Matt Wisler to no–hit the Cleveland Indians. However, since the feat was achieved in a truncated seven–inning doubleheader game, it was not recorded as an official no-hitter. Fairbanks made 47 appearances in 2021, pitching to a 3.59 ERA with 56 strikeouts in 42 2/3 innings pitched.

On March 30, 2022, it was announced that Fairbanks would miss three months of action after suffering a 50% tear of his lat muscle. He was activated off the injured list on July 17. In his season debut against the Baltimore Orioles, Fairbanks allowed a run on two hits with two strikeouts in an inning of work. He appeared in 24 games for the Rays in 2022, logging a 1.13 ERA with 38 strikeouts in 24 innings pitched, and saved eight games in eight opportunities.

On January 27, 2023, Fairbanks signed a three-year, $12 million contract extension with the Rays. He appeared in 49 games for the Rays in 2023, logging a 2.58 ERA with 68 strikeouts in 45 1/3 innings pitched. Fairbanks also saved 25 games in 29 opportunities. In 2024, Fairbanks appeared in 46 games for the Rays, logging a 3.57 ERA with 44 strikeouts and 23 saves over 45 1/3 innings pitched.

Fairbanks made 61 appearances for Tampa Bay during the 2025 campaign, compiling a 4–5 record and 2.83 ERA with 59 strikeouts and 27 saves across 60 1/3 innings pitched. The Rays declined Fairbanks' 2026 option on November 6, 2025, making him a free agent.

=== Miami Marlins ===
On December 28, 2025, Fairbanks signed a one-year, $13 million contract with the Miami Marlins. He made 46 appearances for the Marlins, logging a 4–5 record and 6.31 ERA with 57 strikeouts across 41 1/3 innings pitched. On September 18, 2026, it was announced that Fairbanks would required surgery to address thoracic outlet syndrome, ending his season.

== Personal life ==
Fairbanks' father, Shane Fairbanks, played college baseball for the Missouri Tigers in the 1980s and in minor league baseball for the Houston Astros' organization in 1983.

Fairbanks and his wife, Lydia, have one son and one daughter together. Their third child died from Turner syndrome.
