= Andrew Kittredge =

American baseball player (born 1990)

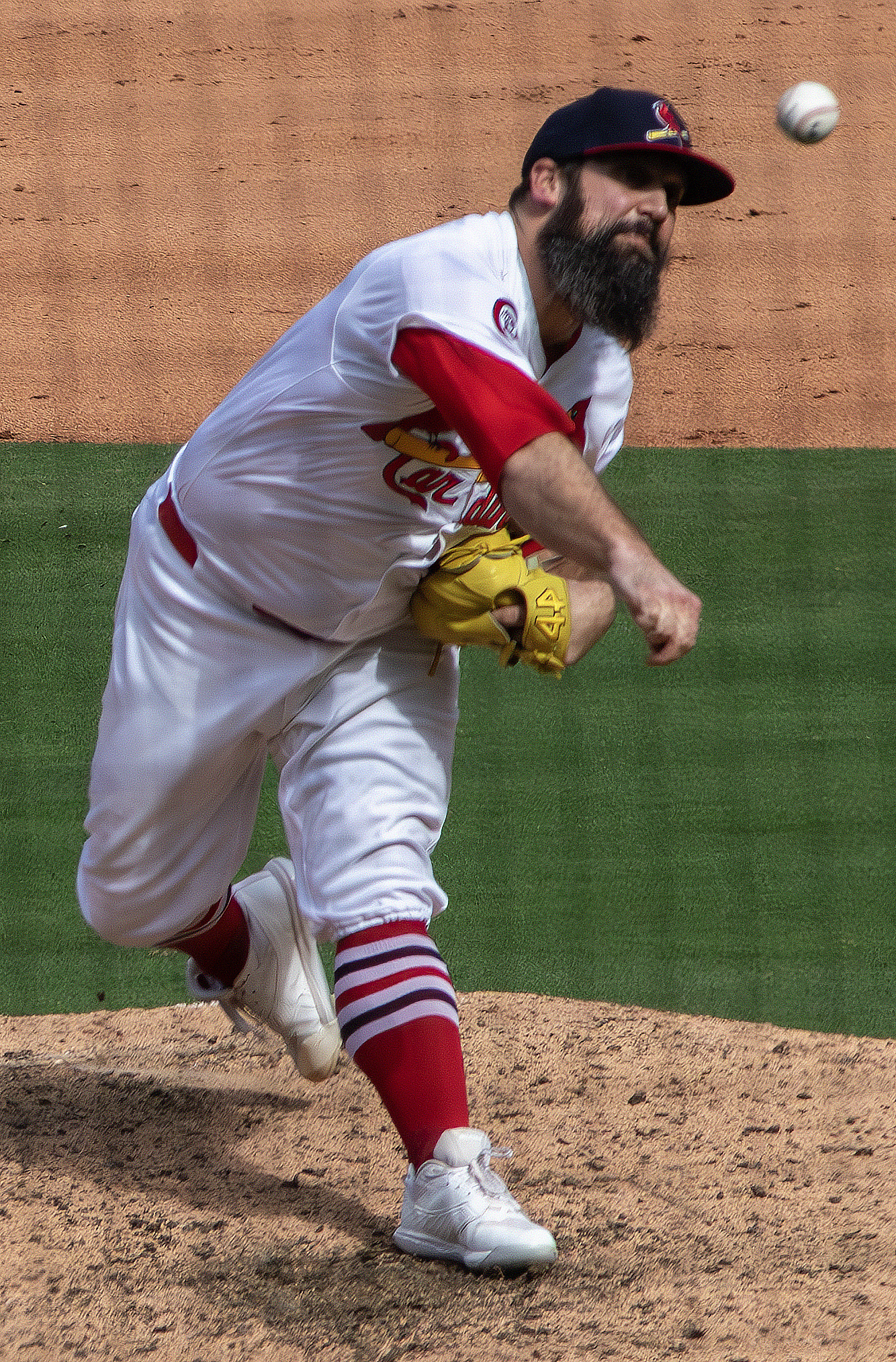
- Kittredge with the St. Louis Cardinals

Free agent
- Pitcher
- Born: March 17, 1990 (age 36); Spokane, Washington, U.S.
- Bats: Right Throws: Right

MLB debut
- July 18, 2017, for the Tampa Bay Rays

MLB statistics (through 2026 season)
- Win–loss record: 30–18
- Earned run average: 3.44
- Strikeouts: 377
- Saves: 32
- Stats at Baseball Reference

Teams
- Tampa Bay Rays (2017–2023); St. Louis Cardinals (2024); Baltimore Orioles (2025); Chicago Cubs (2025); Baltimore Orioles (2026)

Career highlights and awards
- All-Star (2021); Pitched an Immaculate Inning on August 6, 2025

Andrew Michael Kittredge (born March 17, 1990) is an American professional baseball pitcher who is a free agent. He has previously played in Major League Baseball (MLB) for the Tampa Bay Rays, St. Louis Cardinals, Chicago Cubs, and Baltimore Orioles.

== Amateur career ==
Kittredge attended Ferris High School in Spokane, Washington. He was drafted out of high school by the Seattle Mariners in the 45th round of the 2008 Major League Baseball draft, but opted to attend the University of Washington. In 2010, he played collegiate summer baseball with the Orleans Firebirds of the Cape Cod Baseball League.

== Professional career ==
=== Seattle Mariners ===
On August 25, 2011, Kittredge signed with the Seattle Mariners as an undrafted free agent. He made his professional debut for the Low-A Everett AquaSox.

Kittredge split the 2012 campaign between Single-A Clinton LumberKings, High-A High Desert Mavericks, and Double-A Jackson Generals. In 25 appearances for the three affiliates, he compiled a 3-1 record and 4.07 ERA with 43 strikeouts across 42 innings pitched. Kittredge split 2013 between High Desert, Jackson, and the Triple-A Tacoma Rainiers. In 41 total appearances, he struggled to a 1-5 record and 6.39 ERA with 58 strikeouts across 62 innings pitched.

In 2014, Kittredge played for Everett, High Desert, and Jackson. In 46 appearances out of the bullpen, he accumulated a 7-1 record and 4.32 ERA with 117 strikeouts and 8 saves across 89 2/3 innings pitched. Kittredge split 2015 between Jackson and Tacoma, making 36 total appearances and registering a 2-2 record and 4.32 ERA with 60 strikeouts across 75 innings pitched. He returned to Jackson and Tacoma in 2016, compiling a combined 3-3 record and 3.50 ERA with 84 strikeouts and 7 saves across 37 games.

=== Tampa Bay Rays ===
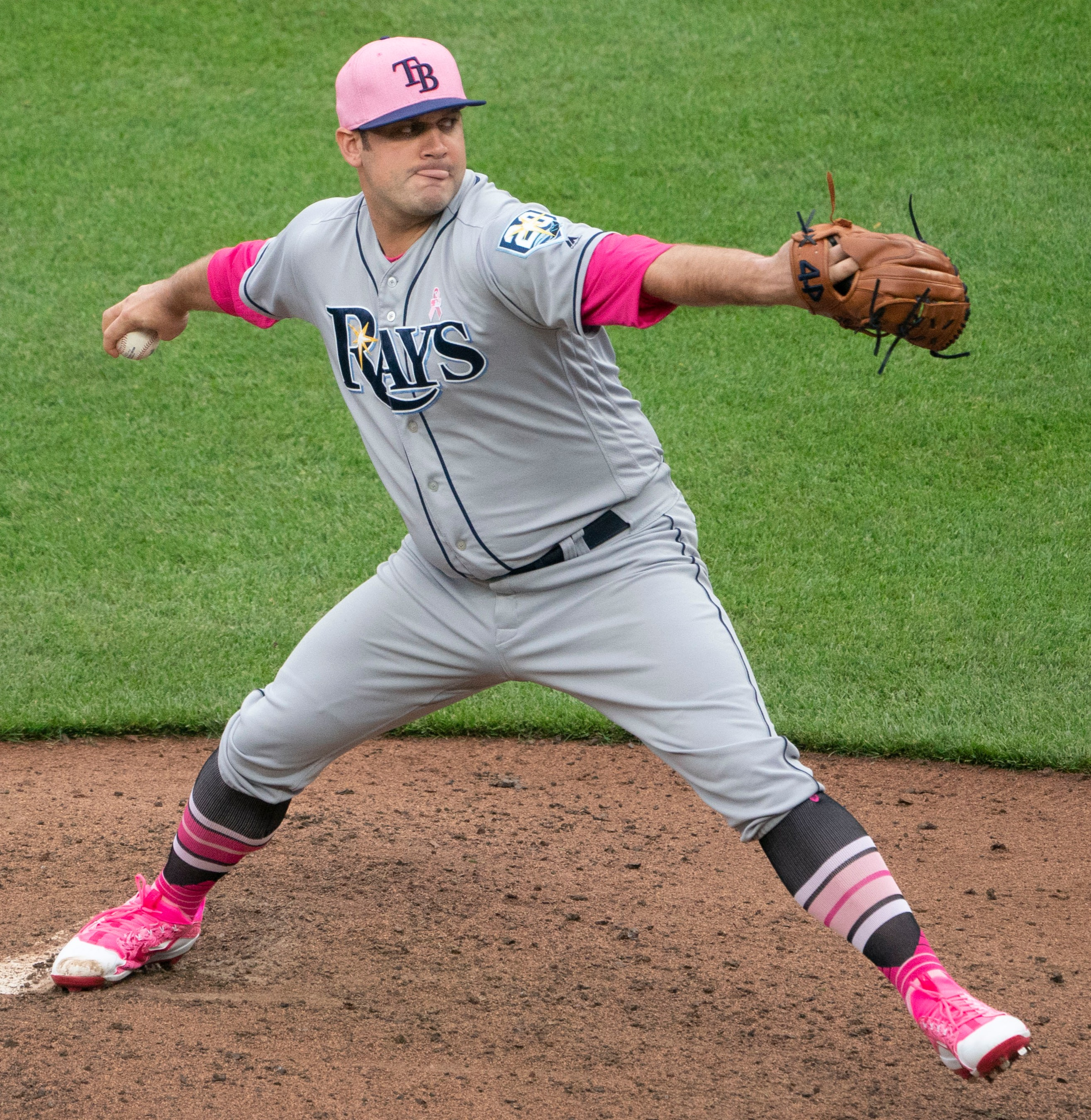
Kittredge with the Tampa Bay Rays

On November 18, 2016, the Mariners traded Kittredge, Dalton Kelly, and Dylan Thompson to the Tampa Bay Rays in exchange for Richie Shaffer and Taylor Motter.

He was called up to the majors for the first time on July 17, 2017. He pitched 2 1/3 innings, allowing one run on five hits before being optioned back to the Triple-A Durham Bulls to make room for newly acquired Sergio Romo. Kittredge was called back up on July 26 to replace the injured Jake Odorizzi. He was sent back down a few games later but was recalled in September when rosters expanded. In 15 games, he had an ERA of 1.76 in 15 1/3 innings.

On September 27, 2018, Kittredge threw a pitch at Yankees catcher Austin Romine's head following CC Sabathia hitting Jake Bauers on the hand with a pitch. Kittredge was fined an undisclosed amount and received a 3-game suspension, which was later rescinded. He finished the season appearing in 33 games, including 3 starts. He had a 7.75 ERA in 38 1/3 innings.

On November 2, 2018, the Rays announced that Kittredge had been designated for assignment and sent outright to Triple-A Durham. On June 18, 2019, the Rays announced that they had selected Kittredge's contract, adding him to their active roster. In 37 appearances for Tampa Bay in 2019, he recorded a 4.17 ERA with 58 strikeouts across 49 2/3 innings of work.

Kittredge posted a 2.25 ERA with 3 strikeouts over 8 appearances in 2020. He sprained his UCL while pitching against the Boston Red Sox on August 12, 2020, which ended his season. On October 30, Kittredge was outrighted off of the 40-man roster and elected free agency. On December 8, Kittredge re-signed with the Rays organization on a minor league contract. On March 15, 2021, Kittredge triggered an opt-out clause in his deal and became a free agent, but re-signed with the Rays on a new minor league contract on March 20. On March 26, Kittredge was selected to the 40-man roster.

In the first half of 2021, Kittredge pitched to a 1.47 ERA in 43 innings across 32 games. He was named to the 2021 All-Star Game on July 12.

In 2022, Kittredge pitched to a 3.15 ERA in 20 innings across 17 games. On June 10, it was announced he would undergo Tommy John surgery, ending his season. Kittredge began the 2023 season on the injured list while rehabilitating from the surgery and was activated on August 17.

=== St. Louis Cardinals ===
On January 5, 2024, the Rays traded Kittredge to the St. Louis Cardinals in exchange for Richie Palacios. In 74 relief appearances for the Cardinals, he compiled a 5-5 record and 2.80 ERA with 67 strikeouts across 70 2/3 innings pitched. Kittredge became a free agent following the season.

=== Baltimore Orioles ===
On January 13, 2025, Kittredge signed a one-year, $10 million contract with the Baltimore Orioles. On March 7, Kittredge underwent a left knee debridement and was ruled out for multiple months. He was activated from the injured list on May 21. In 31 appearances for Baltimore, Kittredge compiled a 2-2 record and 3.45 ERA with 32 strikeouts across 31 1/3 innings pitched.

=== Chicago Cubs ===
On July 31, 2025, the Orioles traded Kittredge to the Chicago Cubs in exchange for infielder Wilfri De La Cruz. In his first game against the Baltimore Orioles since he had been traded Kittredge struck out two of his former teammates. On August 6, in the top of the 7th inning against the Cincinnati Reds, he threw an immaculate inning, the sixth in Cubs history and the first since Hayden Wesneski in 2022. In 23 appearances for Chicago, Kittredge compiled a 2-1 record and 3.32 ERA with 32 strikeouts and five saves across 21 2/3 innings pitched.

=== Baltimore Orioles (second stint) ===
On November 4, 2025, Kittredge was traded back to the Baltimore Orioles in exchange for cash considerations.

== Personal life ==
Kittredge married his wife, Tobey, in 2017, with whom he has two children. They live in Spokane, Washington.
