= 2021 Toronto Blue Jays season =

2021 Toronto Blue Jays
- League: American League
- Division: East
- Ballpark: TD Ballpark; Sahlen Field; Rogers Centre
- City: Dunedin, Florida; Buffalo, New York; Toronto, Ontario
- Record: 91–71 (.562)
- Divisional place: 4th
- Owners: Rogers, CEO Mark Shapiro
- General managers: Ross Atkins
- Managers: Charlie Montoyo
- Television: Sportsnet; Sportsnet One (Dan Shulman, Buck Martinez, Pat Tabler)
- Radio: Blue Jays Radio Network; Sportsnet 590 the FAN (Dan Shulman, Buck Martinez, Pat Tabler, Ben Wagner)

The 2021 Toronto Blue Jays season was the franchise's 45th season in Major League Baseball.

Due to the COVID-19 pandemic and associated travel restrictions, the team played their first 21 games at their spring training home of TD Ballpark in Dunedin, Florida, instead of returning to their normal home of Rogers Centre in Toronto, with the hope of moving back once Canada–U.S. travel restrictions were eased. Starting in June, the team then played 23 home games at Sahlen Field in Buffalo, New York (their home in 2020). On July 30, the Blue Jays returned to Rogers Centre for the first time since the 2019 season.

The Blue Jays finished the regular season with a 91–71 record, giving the team their best win percentage since 2015, but did not qualify for the postseason. The team finished in fourth place in the American League East, one game behind both the Boston Red Sox and New York Yankees, which secured the AL's two wild card spots.

== Offseason ==
The Toronto Blue Jays signed Robbie Ray, Tyler Chatwood, Kirby Yates, George Springer, Marcus Semien, and Joe Panik. However, Yates had a season-ending Tommy John surgery shortly before the start of the regular season, the second such surgery in his life.

== Regular season ==
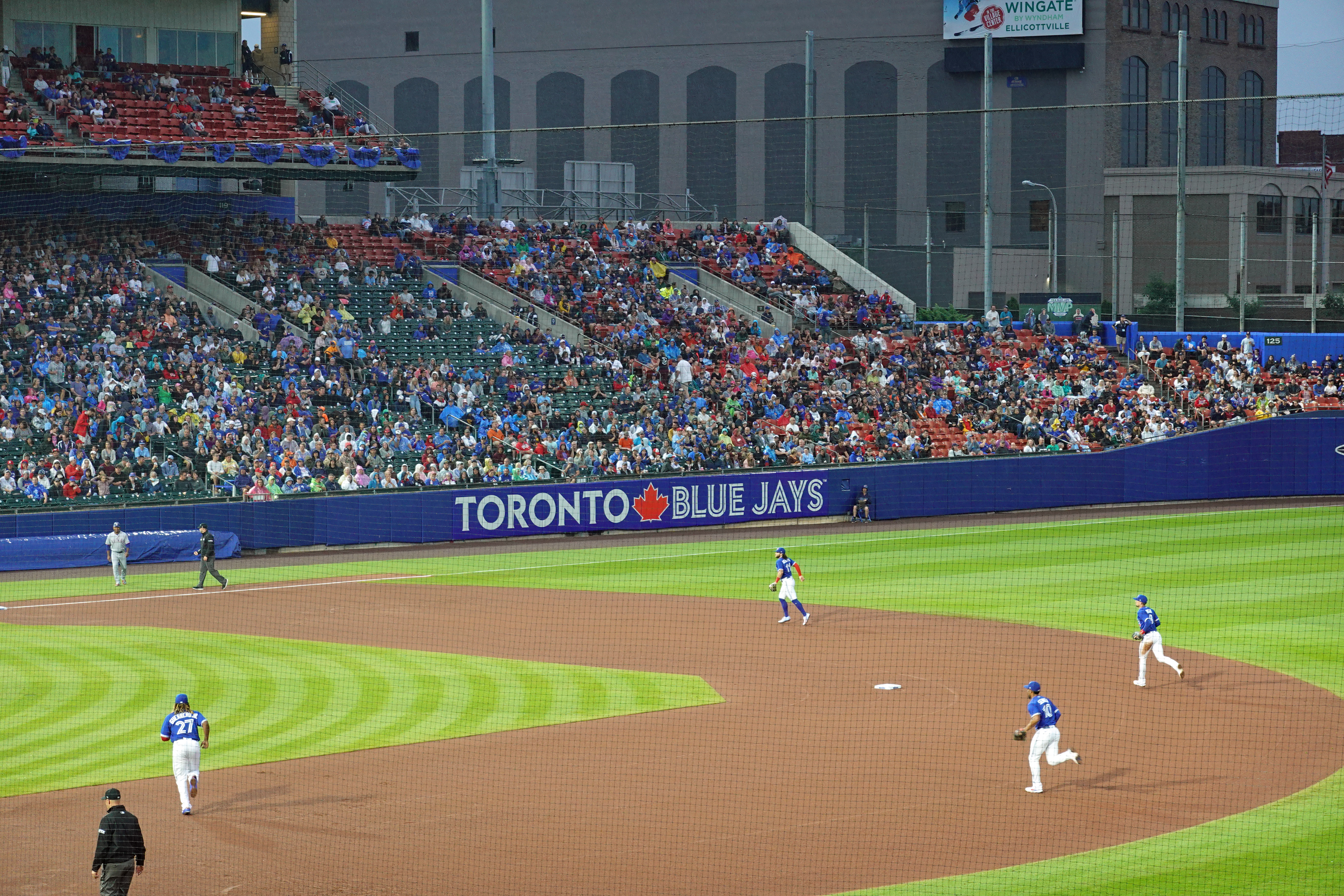
The Blue Jays playing a home game at Sahlen Field in Buffalo, New York in July 2021

=== American League East ===
AL East
Team	W	L	Pct.	GB	Home	Road
Tampa Bay Rays	100	62	.617	—	52‍–‍29	48‍–‍33
Boston Red Sox	92	70	.568	8	49‍–‍32	43‍–‍38
New York Yankees	92	70	.568	8	46‍–‍35	46‍–‍35
Toronto Blue Jays	91	71	.562	9	47‍–‍33	44‍–‍38
Baltimore Orioles	52	110	.321	48	27‍–‍54	25‍–‍56

=== American League Wild Card ===
Division leaders
Team	W	L	Pct.
Tampa Bay Rays	100	62	.617
Houston Astros	95	67	.586
Chicago White Sox	93	69	.574

Wild Card teams (Top 2 teams qualify for postseason)
Team	W	L	Pct.	GB
Boston Red Sox	92	70	.568	—
New York Yankees	92	70	.568	—
Toronto Blue Jays	91	71	.562	1
Seattle Mariners	90	72	.556	2
Oakland Athletics	86	76	.531	6
Cleveland Indians	80	82	.494	12
Los Angeles Angels	77	85	.475	15
Detroit Tigers	77	85	.475	15
Kansas City Royals	74	88	.457	18
Minnesota Twins	73	89	.451	19
Texas Rangers	60	102	.370	32
Baltimore Orioles	52	110	.321	40

=== Blue Jays team leaders ===
Batting
Batting average†	Vladimir Guerrero Jr.	.311
RBIs	Teoscar Hernández	116
Home runs	Vladimir Guerrero Jr.	48
Runs scored	Vladimir Guerrero Jr.	123
Stolen bases	Bo Bichette	25
Pitching
Wins	Hyun-jin Ryu	14
ERA‡	Robbie Ray	2.84
WHIP‡	Robbie Ray	1.04
Strikeouts	Robbie Ray	248
Saves	Jordan Romano	23

† Minimum 3.1 plate appearances per team games played
AVG qualified batters: Bichette, Grichuk, Guerrero Jr., Gurriel Jr., Hernández, Semien
‡ Minimum 1 inning pitched per team games played
ERA & WHIP qualified pitchers: Ray, Ryu

== Records vs opponents ==
	Record			Games Left		
Opponent	Home	Road	Total	Home	Road	Total
AL East
Baltimore Orioles	8–2	6–3	14–5	–	–	–
Boston Red Sox	4–5	5–5	9–10	–	–	–
New York Yankees	3–6	8–2	11–8	–	–	–
Tampa Bay Rays	4–6	4–5	8–11	–	–	–
Totals	19–19	23–15	42–34	–	–	–
AL Central
Chicago White Sox	2–2	1–2	3–4	–	–	–
Cleveland Indians	3–1	2–1	5–2	–	–	–
Detroit Tigers	1–2	2–1	3–3	–	–	–
Kansas City Royals	3–0	1–3	4–3	–	–	–
Minnesota Twins	2–1	2–2	4–3	–	–	–
Totals	11–6	8–9	19–15	–	–	–
AL West
Houston Astros	1–2	1–2	2–4	–	–	–
Los Angeles Angels	1–3	2–1	3–4	–	–	–
Oakland Athletics	3–0	2–2	5–2	–	–	–
Seattle Mariners	1–2	1–2	2–4	–	–	–
Texas Rangers	3–0	1–2	4–2	–	–	–
Totals	9–7	7–9	16–16	–	–	–
National League
Atlanta Braves	3–0	3–0	6–0	–	–	–
Miami Marlins	2–0	2–0	4–0	–	–	–
New York Mets	–	1–2	1–2	–	–	–
Philadelphia Phillies	2–1	–	2–1	–	–	–
Washington Nationals	1–1	0–2	1–3	–	–	–
Totals	8–2	6–4	14–6	–	–	–
Grand Totals	47–34	44–37	91–71	–	–	–

Month	Games	Won	Lost	Pct.
April	24	12	12	.500
May	28	15	13	.536
June	26	14	12	.538
July	23	12	11	.522
August	30	16	14	.533
September	28	19	9	.679
October	3	3	0	1.000
Totals	162	91	71	.562

== 2021 draft ==
The 2021 Major League Baseball draft began on July 11. The draft was shortened to 20 rounds for the 2021 season due to the ongoing COVID-19 pandemic. The Blue Jays forfeited their second round selection due to signing George Springer during the offseason.

Round	Pick	Player	Position	College/School	Nationality	Signed
1	19	Gunnar Hoglund	RHP	Ole Miss	(United States)	July 16
3	91	Ricky Tiedemann	LHP	Golden West	(United States)	July 21
4	121	Chad Dallas	RHP	Tennessee	(United States)	July 17
5	152	Irv Carter	RHP	Calvary Christian Academy	(United States)	July 19
6	182	Hayden Juenger	RHP	Missouri State	(United States)	July 21
7	212	Jaden Rudd	OF	A. Crawford Mosley High School	(United States)	July 21
8	242	Hunter Gregory	RHP	Old Dominion	(United States)	July 21
9	272	Conor Larkin	RHP	Penn State	(United States)	July 21
10	302	Connor Cooke	RHP	Louisiana-Lafayette	(United States)	July 21

== Game log ==
Legend
Blue Jays win	Blue Jays loss	Game postponed

2021 Game Log: 91–71 (Home: 47–34; Away: 44–37)
April: 12–12 (Home: 5–4; Road: 7–8)

#	Date	Opponent	Score	Win	Loss	Save	Attendance	Record	GB
1	April 1	@ Yankees	3–2 (10)	Romano (1–0)	Nelson (0–1)	Merryweather (1)	10,850	1–0	—
2	April 3	@ Yankees	3–5	Loáisiga (1–0)	Stripling (0–1)	Green (1)	10,107	1–1	1
3	April 4	@ Yankees	3–1	Borucki (1–0)	Germán (0–1)	Merryweather (2)	10,066	2–1	1
4	April 5	@ Rangers	6–2	Matz (1–0)	Foltynewicz (0–1)	—	38,258	3–1	—
5	April 6	@ Rangers	4–7	Dunning (1–0)	Roark (0–1)	Kennedy (1)	18,585	3–2	—
6	April 7	@ Rangers	1–2	Gibson (1–0)	Ryu (0–1)	Kennedy (2)	16,876	3–3	1
7	April 8	Angels	5–7 (11)	Guerra (2–0)	Borucki (1–1)	Iglesias (2)	1,348	3–4	1
8	April 9	Angels	1–7	Heaney (1–1)	Zeuch (0–1)	—	1,523	3–5	1½
9	April 10	Angels	15–1	Matz (2–0)	Quintana (0–1)	Milone (1)	1,292	4–5	1½
–	April 11	Angels	Postponed (Rain, Makeup August 10)						
10	April 12	Yankees	1–3	Cole (2–0)	Ray (0–1)	Chapman (1)	1,576	4–6	2½
11	April 13	Yankees	7–3	Ryu (1–1)	Taillon (0–1)	—	1,550	5–6	2½
12	April 14	Yankees	5–4	Dolis (1–0)	Green (0–2)	—	1,613	6–6	3
13	April 15	@ Royals	5–7	Junis (1–0)	Kay (0–1)	Barlow (1)	6,266	6–7	3
—	April 16	@ Royals	Postponed (Rain, Makeup: April 17)						
14	April 17 (1)	@ Royals	5–1 (7)	Matz (3–0)	Minor (1–1)	—	9,048	7–7	
15	April 17 (2)	@ Royals	2–3 (7)	Holland (2–1)	Payamps (0–1)	—	8,950	7–8	3½
16	April 18	@ Royals	0–2	Zimmer (1–0)	Zeuch (0–2)	Holland (2)	9,042	7–9	3
17	April 20	@ Red Sox	2–4	Rodríguez (3–0)	Ryu (1–2)	Barnes (3)	4,728	7–10	4½
18	April 21	@ Red Sox	6–3	Borucki (2–1)	Richards (0–2)	Castro (1)	4,661	8–10	3½
19	April 23	@ Rays	5–3	Matz (4–0)	Glasnow (2–1)	Dolis (1)	5,564	9–10	3
20	April 24	@ Rays	3–5	Thompson (2–1)	Romano (1–1)	Kittredge (1)	6,688	9–11	3
21	April 25	@ Rays	1–0	Mayza (1–0)	Fleming (1–2)	Dolis (2)	6,372	10–11	3
22	April 27	Nationals	9–5	Milone (1–0)	Scherzer (1–2)	—	1,471	11–11	3
23	April 28	Nationals	2–8	Fedde (2–2)	Matz (4–1)	—	1,274	11–12	4
24	April 30	Braves	13–5	Ray (1–1)	Smyly (0–2)	—	1,629	12–12	3½

May: 15–13 (Home: 5–7; Road: 10–6)

#	Date	Opponent	Score	Win	Loss	Save	Attendance	Record	GB
25	May 1	Braves	6–5 (10)	Romano (2–1)	Jones (0–2)	—	1,634	13–12	2½
26	May 2	Braves	7–2	Borucki (3–1)	Anderson (2–1)	Dolis (3)	1,554	14–12	1½
27	May 3	@ Athletics	4–5	Montas (3–2)	Matz (4–2)	Diekman (3)	2,944	14–13	2
28	May 4	@ Athletics	1–4	Irvin (3–3)	Kay (0–2)	Petit (1)	2,970	14–14	3
29	May 5	@ Athletics	9–4	Romano (3–1)	Trivino (1–1)	—	2,893	15–14	2
30	May 6	@ Athletics	10–4	Ryu (2–2)	Fiers (0–2)	—	3,611	16–14	2
31	May 7	@ Astros	4–10	Urquidy (3–2)	Stripling (0–2)	—	25,410	16–15	3
32	May 8	@ Astros	8–4	Matz (5–2)	Javier (3–1)	—	25,794	17–15	3
33	May 9	@ Astros	4–7	Abreu (2–1)	Pearson (0–1)	Pressly (6)	24,355	17–16	4
34	May 11	@ Braves	5–3	Thornton (1–0)	Minter (1–1)	Romano (1)	21,688	18–16	2½
35	May 12	@ Braves	4–1	Ryu (3–2)	Jackson (1–1)	Cole (1)	21,171	19–16	1½
36	May 13	@ Braves	8–4	Bergen (1–0)	Smith (0–3)	—	21,653	20–16	1½
37	May 14	Phillies	1–5	Brogdon (4–1)	Thornton (1–1)	—	1,171	20–17	2½
38	May 15	Phillies	4–0	Bergen (2–0)	Nola (3–3)	—	1,397	21–17	2½
39	May 16	Phillies	10–8	Ray (2–1)	Anderson (2–4)	—	1,107	22–17	1½
40	May 18	Red Sox	8–0	Ryu (4–2)	Rodríguez (5–2)	—	1,566	23–17	½
41	May 19	Red Sox	3–7	Richards (4–2)	Stripling (0–3)	—	1,581	23–18	1½
42	May 20	Red Sox	7–8	Valdéz (2–0)	Dolis (1–1)	Barnes (10)	1,562	23–19	2½
43	May 21	Rays	7–9 (12)	Castillo (1–2)	Beasley (0–1)	—	1,437	23–20	3½
44	May 22	Rays	1–3	Kittredge (5–0)	Castro (0–1)	Castillo (8)	1,514	23–21	4½
45	May 23	Rays	4–6	Fleming (4–3)	Chatwood (0–1)	Feyereisen (1)	1,496	23–22	4½
46	May 24	Rays	8–14 (11)	Springs (4–1)	Payamps (0–2)	—	1,641	23–23	5½
47	May 25	@ Yankees	6–2	Matz (6–2)	Kluber (4–3)	—	12,025	24–23	4½
—	May 26	@ Yankees	Postponed (Rain, Makeup May 27)						
48	May 27 (1)	@ Yankees	2–0 (7)	Manoah (1–0)	Germán (4–3)	Romano (2)	N/A	25–23	
49	May 27 (2)	@ Yankees	3–5 (7)	Loáisiga (4–2)	Ray (2–2)	Green (2)	14,056	25–24	5½
50	May 28	@ Indians	11–2 (7)	Ryu (5–2)	Morgan (0–1)	—	9,198	26–24	5
—	May 29	@ Indians	Postponed (Rain, Makeup May 30)						
51	May 30 (1)	@ Indians	4–1 (7)	Stripling (1–3)	Civale (7–2)	Romano (3)	N/A	27–24	5½
52	May 30 (2)	@ Indians	5–6 (7)	Clase (3–2)	Chatwood (0–2)	—	11,690	27–25	6

June: 14–12 (Home: 7–7; Road: 7–5)

#	Date	Opponent	Score	Win	Loss	Save	Attendance	Record	GB
53	June 1	Marlins	5–1	Ray (3–2)	Alcántara (2–5)	—	5,321	28–25	5½
54	June 2	Marlins	6–5	Castro (1–1)	García (3–4)	—	5,385	29–25	4½
55	June 4	Astros	1–13	Greinke (6–2)	Ryu (5–3)	—	5,510	29–26	5
56	June 5	Astros	6–2	Stripling (2–3)	Urquidy (4–3)	—	5,327	30–26	5
57	June 6	Astros	3–6	García (5–3)	Matz (6–3)	Pressly (9)	5,404	30–27	6
58	June 8	@ White Sox	1–6	Crochet (2–2)	Thornton (1–2)	—	12,761	30–28	7
59	June 9	@ White Sox	6–2	Chatwood (1–2)	Bummer (0–4)	—	14,438	31–28	6
60	June 10	@ White Sox	2–5	Keuchel (5–1)	Ryu (5–4)	Hendriks (16)	16,903	31-29	6½
61	June 11	@ Red Sox	5–6	Whitlock (2–1)	Dolis (1–2)	—	25,257	31–30	7½
62	June 12	@ Red Sox	7–2	Matz (7–3)	Pivetta (6–2)	—	24,024	32–30	7½
63	June 13	@ Red Sox	18–4	Ray (4–2)	Pérez (4–4)	—	22,595	33–30	7½
64	June 14	@ Red Sox	1–2	Barnes (3–1)	Dolis (1–3)	—	20,070	33–31	8½
65	June 15	Yankees	5–6	Loáisiga (6–2)	Mayza (1–1)	Chapman (13)	7,145	33–32	8½
66	June 16	Yankees	2–3	Cole (8–3)	Stripling (2–4)	Chapman (14)	7,271	33–33	8½
67	June 17	Yankees	4–8	Green (1–4)	Castro (1–2)	—	7,288	33–34	8½
68	June 18	@ Orioles	1–7	Wells (2–0)	Ray (4–3)	—	13,284	33–35	8½
69	June 19	@ Orioles	10–7	Romano (4–1)	Fry (0–2)	—	10,721	34–35	8
70	June 20	@ Orioles	7–4	Ryu (6–4)	Harvey (3–9)	Chatwood (1)	14,917	35–35	7
71	June 22	@ Marlins	2–1	Mayza (2–1)	García (3–6)	Romano (4)	6,291	36–35	7
72	June 23	@ Marlins	3–1	Ray (5–3)	Rogers (7–4)	Romano (5)	6,164	37–35	6
73	June 24	Orioles	9–0	Kay (1–2)	Kremer (0–7)	—	6,264	38–35	5½
74	June 25	Orioles	5–6 (10)	Fry (1–2)	Thornton (1–3)	Sulser (2)	7,844	38–36	6½
75	June 26	Orioles	12–4	Ryu (7–4)	Akin (0–4)	—	5,913	39–36	6½
76	June 27	Orioles	5–2	Stripling (3–4)	López (2–10)	Romano (6)	6,044	40–36	6
77	June 29	Mariners	9–3	Ray (6–3)	Montero (5–3)	—	6,736	41–36	6½
78	June 30	Mariners	7–9 (10)	Graveman (2–0)	Murphy (0–1)	Steckenrider (2)	6,632	41–37	7½

July: 12–11 (Home: 7–4; Road: 5–7)

#	Date	Opponent	Score	Win	Loss	Save	Attendance	Record	GB
79	July 1	Mariners	2–7	Kikuchi (6–3)	Ryu (7–5)	Sewald (1)	5,456	41–38	8½
80	July 2	Rays	11–1	Manoah (2–0)	Patiño (1–2)	—	10,011	42–38	8½
81	July 3	Rays	6–3	Cimber (2–2)	McClanahan (3–3)	—	9,189	43–38	7½
82	July 4	Rays	1–5	Yarbrough (5–3)	Ray (6–4)	—	7,537	43–39	8½
83	July 6	@ Orioles	5–7	Watkins (1–0)	Matz (7–4)	—	7,388	43–40	9
84	July 7	@ Orioles	10–2	Ryu (8–5)	Harvey (3–10)	—	7,457	44–40	8
—	July 8	@ Orioles	Postponed (Rain, Makeup September 11)						
85	July 9	@ Rays	1–7	Kittredge (6–1)	Manoah (2–1)	—	8,551	44–41	9
86	July 10	@ Rays	2–5	Yarbrough (6–3)	Stripling (3–5)	Castillo (13)	9,954	44–42	9
87	July 11	@ Rays	3–1	Ray (7–4)	Hill (6–4)	Romano (7)	11,233	45–42	8
88	July 16	Rangers	10–2	Ray (8–4)	Lyles (5–6)	—	10,100	46–42	8
—	July 17	Rangers	Postponed (Rain, Makeup July 18)						
89	July 18 (1)	Rangers	5–0 (7)	Ryu (9–5)	Allard (2–7)	—	N/A	47–42	7
90	July 18 (2)	Rangers	10–0 (7)	Matz (8–4)	Foltynewicz (2–9)	—	12,335	48–42	6
91	July 19	Red Sox	4–13	Pivetta (8–4)	Stripling (3–6)	—	12,811	48–43	7
—	July 20	Red Sox	Postponed (Rain, Makeup August 7)						
92	July 21	Red Sox	4–7	Richards (6–5)	Ray (8–5)	Barnes (20)	14,607	48–44	8
93	July 23	@ Mets	0–3	Megill (1–0)	Matz (8–5)	Díaz (20)	28,126	48–45	9½
94	July 24	@ Mets	10–3	Richards (4–0)	Walker (7–4)	—	29,269	49–45	8½
95	July 25	@ Mets	4–5	Lugo (3–1)	Barnes (1–2)	Díaz (21)	23,675	49–46	9½
96	July 26	@ Red Sox	4–5	Ottavino (3–3)	Richards (4–1)	Barnes (22)	27,142	49–47	10½
—	July 27	@ Red Sox	Postponed (Rain, Makeup July 28)						
97	July 28 (1)	@ Red Sox	4–1 (7)	Ray (9–5)	Richards (6–6)	Romano (8)	27,410	50–47	9½
98	July 28 (2)	@ Red Sox	1–4 (7)	Whitlock (4–1)	Matz (8–6)	Barnes (23)	27,783	50–48	10½
99	July 29	@ Red Sox	13–1	Ryu (10–5)	Rodríguez (7–6)	—	33,191	51–48	9½
100	July 30	Royals	6–4	Stripling (4–6)	Lynch (1–3)	Romano (9)	13,446	52–48	8½
101	July 31	Royals	4–0	Manoah (3–1)	Minor (8–9)	—	13,953	53–48	8

August: 16–14 (Home: 11–8; Road: 5–6)

#	Date	Opponent	Score	Win	Loss	Save	Attendance	Record	GB
102	August 1	Royals	5–1	Berríos (8–5)	Keller (7–10)	—	14,427	54–48	8
103	August 2	Indians	2–5 (10)	Shaw (4–5)	Hand (5–6)	Clase (14)	14,653	54–49	8
104	August 3	Indians	7–2	Ryu (11–5)	Plesac (6–4)	—	14,270	55–49	7
105	August 4	Indians	8–6	Matz (9–6)	Mejía (1–7)	—	14,410	56–49	7
106	August 5	Indians	3–0	Stripling (5–6)	McKenzie (1–5)	Cimber (1)	14,289	57–49	6½
107	August 6	Red Sox	12–4	Manoah (4–1)	Eovaldi (9–7)	—	14,719	58–49	6½
108	August 7 (1)	Red Sox	1–0 (7)	Romano (5–1)	Barnes (5–3)	—	14,768	59–49	6
109	August 7 (2)	Red Sox	1–2 (8)	Barnes (6–3)	Cimber (2–3)	Ottavino (8)	12,659	59–50	7
110	August 8	Red Sox	9–8	Dolis (2–3)	Barnes (6–4)	Romano (10)	14,766	60–50	7
111	August 10 (1)	Angels	3–6	Guerra (3–2)	Matz (9–7)	Iglesias (25)	3,656	60–51	7½
112	August 10 (2)	@ Angels	4–0	Richards (5–1)	Suárez (5–5)	—	14,443	61–51	7½
113	August 11	@ Angels	10–2	Manoah (5–1)	Bundy (2–9)	—	22,620	62–51	6½
114	August 12	@ Angels	3–6	Ohtani (7–1)	Berríos (8–6)	—	19,590	62–52	7½
115	August 13	@ Mariners	2–3	Steckenrider (5–2)	Cimber (2–4)	—	28,207	62–53	8½
116	August 14	@ Mariners	3–9	Middleton (1–2)	Ryu (11–6)	—	26,090	62–54	8½
117	August 15	@ Mariners	8–3	Matz (10–7)	Gilbert (5–4)	—	22,679	63–54	7½
118	August 17	@ Nationals	6–12	Fedde (5–8)	Manoah (5–2)	—	20,060	63–55	9
119	August 18	@ Nationals	5–8	Thompson (1–1)	Hand (5–7)	Finnegan (4)	18,336	63–56	10
120	August 20	Tigers	1–4 (10)	Soto (5–3)	Richards (5–2)	—	14,649	63–57	10½
121	August 21	Tigers	3–0	Ryu (12–6)	Peralta (3–3)	Romano (11)	14,887	64–57	10½
122	August 22	Tigers	3–5 (11)	Soto (6–3)	Snead (0–1)	Jiménez (1)	14,865	64–58	11½
123	August 23	White Sox	2–1	Mayza (3–1)	Kimbrel (2–4)	Romano (12)	14,640	65–58	11
124	August 24	White Sox	2–5	Cease (10–6)	Berríos (8–7)	Hendriks (29)	14,553	65–59	12
125	August 25	White Sox	3–1	Mayza (4–1)	Bummer (2–5)	Romano (13)	14,276	66–59	12
126	August 26	White Sox	7–10	Rodón (10–5)	Ryu (12–7)	Kimbrel (24)	14,958	66–60	12½
127	August 27	@ Tigers	1–2	Cisnero (3–4)	Mayza (4–2)	Soto (16)	17,259	66–61	13½
128	August 28	@ Tigers	3–2 (10)	Romano (6–1)	Funkhouser (6–2)	—	18,783	67–61	13½
129	August 29	@ Tigers	2–1	Berríos (9–7)	Boyd (3–7)	Mayza (1)	15,956	68–61	13½
130	August 30	Orioles	7–3	Ray (10–5)	Tate (0–4)	Romano (14)	14,406	69–61	13½
131	August 31	Orioles	2–4	Akin (2–8)	Ryu (12–8)	Sulser (6)	13,963	69–62	14½

September: 19–9 (Home: 9–4; Road: 10–5)

#	Date	Opponent	Score	Win	Loss	Save	Attendance	Record	GB
132	September 1	Orioles	5–4	Mayza (5–2)	Tate (0–5)	Romano (15)	14,262	70–62	13½
133	September 3	Athletics	11–10	Romano (7–1)	Romo (1–1)	—	14,843	71–62	13
134	September 4	Athletics	10–8	Berríos (10–7)	Blackburn (0–2)	—	14,947	72–62	13
135	September 5	Athletics	8–0	Ray (11–5)	Irvin (9–13)	—	14,988	73–62	12
136	September 6	@ Yankees	8–0	Ryu (13–8)	Taillon (8–6)	—	31,196	74–62	12
137	September 7	@ Yankees	5–1	Matz (11–8)	Cole (14–7)	—	30,164	75–62	12
138	September 8	@ Yankees	6–3	Richards (6–2)	Holmes (6–3)	Romano (16)	25,873	76–62	11
139	September 9	@ Yankees	6–4	Berríos (11–7)	Romano (0–2)	—	30,112	77–62	10½
140	September 10	@ Orioles	3–6	Greene (1–0)	Merryweather (0–1)	Sulser (7)	11,751	77–63	10½
141	September 11 (1)	@ Orioles	11–10 (7)	Pearson (1–1)	Wells (2–2)	Romano (17)	N/A	78–63	10
142	September 11 (2)	@ Orioles	11–2 (7)	Richards (7–2)	Akin (2–9)	—	10,219	79–63	10
143	September 12	@ Orioles	22–7	Matz (12–7)	Lowther (0–2)	—	8,474	80–63	9
144	September 13	Rays	8–1	Manoah (6–2)	Yarbrough (8–5)	—	12,119	81–63	8
145	September 14	Rays	0–2	Rasmussen (3–1)	Berríos (11–8)	Kittredge (7)	13,103	81–64	9
146	September 15	Rays	6–3	Ray (12–5)	Wacha (3–5)	Romano (18)	12,153	82–64	8
147	September 17	Twins	3–7	Pineda (7–8)	Ryu (13–9)	—	14,798	82–65	9½
148	September 18	Twins	6–2	Matz (13–7)	Ober (2–3)	—	14,722	83–65	8½
149	September 19	Twins	5–3	Berríos (12–8)	Farrell (1–1)	Romano (19)	14,601	84–65	7½
150	September 20	@ Rays	4–6	Baz (1–0)	Ray (12–6)	Enns (2)	10,119	84–66	8½
151	September 21	@ Rays	4–2	Manoah (7–2)	Anderson (0–1)	Romano (20)	9,888	85–66	7½
152	September 22	@ Rays	1–7	Chargois (6–1)	Stripling (5–7)	—	10,994	85–67	8½
153	September 23	@ Twins	2–7	Pineda (8–8)	Hatch (0–1)	Garza Jr. (1)	15,509	85–68	9
154	September 24	@ Twins	1–3	Ober (3–3)	Berríos (12–9)	Colomé (16)	18,861	85–69	10
155	September 25	@ Twins	6–1	Ray (13–6)	Gant (5–10)	—	27,183	86–69	10
156	September 26	@ Twins	5–2	Manoah (8–2)	Jax (3–5)	Romano (21)	20,676	87–69	10
157	September 28	Yankees	2–7	King (1–4)	Ryu (13–10)	—	28,769	87–70	10
158	September 29	Yankees	6–5	Cimber (3–4)	Holmes (8–4)	Romano (22)	29,601	88–70	10
159	September 30	Yankees	2–6	King (2–4)	Ray (13–7)	—	29,659	88–71	10

October: 3–0 (Home: 3–0; Road: 0–0)

#	Date	Opponent	Score	Win	Loss	Save	Attendance	Record	GB
160	October 1	Orioles	6–4	Matz (14–7)	Eshelman (0–3)	Romano (23)	28,855	89–71	10
161	October 2	Orioles	10–1	Manoah (9–2)	Means (6–9)	—	29,916	90–71	10
162	October 3	Orioles	12–4	Ryu (14–10)	Zimmermann (4–5)	—	29,942	91–71	9

== Statistics ==
=== Batting ===
Note: G = Games played; AB = At bats; R = Runs scored; H = Hits; 2B = Doubles; 3B = Triples; HR = Home runs; RBI = Runs batted in; SB = Stolen bases; BB = Walks; AVG = Batting average; Ref. = Reference

Player	G	AB	R	H	2B	3B	HR	RBI	SB	BB	AVG	Ref.
Riley Adams	12	28	2	3	2	0	0	0	0	2	.107	
Bo Bichette	159	640	121	191	30	1	29	102	25	40	.298	
Cavan Biggio	79	250	27	56	10	1	7	27	3	37	.224	
Jonathan Davis	52	70	16	10	1	0	1	4	4	11	.143	
Corey Dickerson	46	131	16	37	6	2	4	15	4	9	.282	
Jarrod Dyson	25	13	4	1	0	0	0	0	2	4	.077	
Santiago Espinal	92	222	32	69	13	1	2	17	6	22	.311	
Randal Grichuk	149	511	59	123	25	1	22	81	0	27	.241	
Vladimir Guerrero Jr.	161	604	123	188	29	1	48	111	4	86	.311	
Lourdes Gurriel Jr.	141	500	62	138	28	2	21	84	1	32	.276	
Teoscar Hernández	143	550	92	163	29	0	32	116	12	36	.296	
Jared Hoying	2	3	0	0	0	0	0	0	0	0	.000	
Danny Jansen	70	184	32	41	13	0	11	28	0	17	.223	
Alejandro Kirk	60	165	19	40	8	0	8	24	0	19	.242	
Jake Lamb	12	31	5	4	2	0	1	6	0	5	.129	
Otto López	1	1	0	0	0	0	0	0	0	0	.000	
Reese McGuire	78	198	22	50	15	0	1	10	0	15	.253	
Josh Palacios	13	35	7	7	0	0	0	4	0	3	.200	
Joe Panik	42	114	9	28	6	0	2	11	0	8	.246	
Marcus Semien	162	652	115	173	39	2	45	102	15	66	.265	
Kevin Smith	18	32	2	3	0	0	1	1	0	3	.094	
George Springer	78	299	59	79	19	1	22	50	4	37	.264	
Rowdy Tellez	50	139	12	29	4	1	4	8	0	9	.209	
Breyvic Valera	39	87	10	22	6	0	1	15	1	8	.253	
Pitcher totals	162	17	0	0	0	0	0	0	0	0	.000	—
Team totals	162	5476	846	1455	285	13	262	816	81	496	.266	

=== Pitching ===
Note: G = Games pitched; GS = Games started; W = Wins; L = Losses; SV = Saves; ERA = Earned run average; WHIP = Walks plus hits per inning pitched; IP = Innings pitched; H = Hits allowed; R = Total runs allowed; ER = Earned runs allowed; BB = Walks allowed; K = Strikeouts; Ref. = Reference

Player	G	GS	W	L	SV	ERA	WHIP	IP	H	R	ER	BB	K	Ref.
Nick Allgeyer	1	0	0	0	0	0.00	0.00	1	0	0	0	0	0	
Bryan Baker	1	0	0	0	0	0.00	1.00	1	1	0	0	0	1	
Jacob Barnes	10	0	0	1	0	6.30	1.80	10	12	7	7	6	15	
Jeremy Beasley	8	0	0	1	0	7.71	1.71	9 1/3	7	9	8	9	13	
Travis Bergen	10	1	2	0	0	1.69	1.22	10 2/3	5	2	2	8	6	
José Berríos	12	12	5	4	0	3.58	1.09	70 1/3	64	30	28	13	78	
Ryan Borucki	24	0	3	1	0	4.94	1.23	23 2/3	18	14	13	11	21	
Anthony Castro	25	0	1	2	1	4.74	1.26	24 2/3	23	15	13	8	32	
Tyler Chatwood	30	0	1	2	1	5.46	1.43	28	20	17	17	20	32	
Adam Cimber	39	0	2	2	1	1.69	0.96	37 1/3	31	10	7	5	30	
A. J. Cole	6	0	0	0	1	1.13	0.88	8	6	1	1	1	7	
Rafael Dolis	39	0	2	3	3	5.63	1.75	32	29	21	20	27	39	
Carl Edwards Jr.	6	0	0	0	0	6.75	1.88	5 1/3	8	4	4	2	5	
Brad Hand	11	0	0	2	0	7.27	1.85	8 2/3	13	10	7	3	5	
Thomas Hatch	3	2	0	1	0	6.75	1.82	9 1/3	11	7	7	6	8	
Anthony Kay	11	5	1	2	0	5.61	1.66	33 2/3	38	22	21	18	39	
Alek Manoah	20	20	9	2	0	3.22	1.05	111 2/3	77	44	40	40	127	
Steven Matz	29	29	14	7	0	3.82	1.33	150 2/3	158	70	64	43	144	
Tim Mayza	61	0	5	2	1	3.40	0.98	53	40	21	20	12	57	
Julian Merryweather	13	1	0	1	2	4.85	1.31	13	13	7	7	4	12	
Tommy Milone	6	1	1	0	1	6.43	1.64	14	20	10	10	3	17	
Patrick Murphy	8	0	0	1	0	4.82	1.71	9 1/3	12	6	5	4	6	
Connor Overton	4	0	0	0	0	0.00	0.90	6 2/3	4	0	0	2	4	
Joel Payamps	22	0	0	2	0	2.70	1.07	30	21	10	9	11	22	
Nate Pearson	12	1	1	1	0	4.20	1.73	15	14	8	7	12	20	
David Phelps	11	1	0	0	0	0.87	1.16	10 1/3	8	2	1	4	15	
Robbie Ray	32	32	13	7	0	2.84	1.04	193 1/3	150	62	61	52	248	
Trevor Richards	32	0	4	2	0	3.31	0.80	32 2/3	16	13	12	10	37	
Tanner Roark	3	1	0	1	0	6.43	1.29	7	7	7	5	2	8	
Jordan Romano	62	0	7	1	23	2.14	1.05	63	41	17	15	25	85	
Hyun-jin Ryu	31	31	14	10	0	4.37	1.22	169	170	85	82	37	143	
Tayler Saucedo	29	0	0	0	0	4.56	1.25	25 2/3	22	14	13	10	19	
Kirby Snead	7	0	0	1	0	2.35	1.17	7 2/3	7	3	2	2	7	
Joakim Soria	10	0	0	0	0	7.88	1.50	8	8	7	7	4	9	
Ross Stripling	24	19	5	7	0	4.80	1.27	101 1/3	99	55	54	30	94	
Trent Thornton	37	3	1	3	0	4.78	1.43	49	54	33	26	16	52	
Ty Tice	4	0	0	0	0	5.14	1.86	7	9	4	4	4	6	
T. J. Zeuch	5	3	0	2	0	6.60	2.00	15	21	16	11	9	8	
Team totals	162	162	91	71	34	3.91	1.23	1405.1	1257	663	610	473	1468	

== Achievements ==
- In their 11–1 victory over the Tampa Bay Rays on July 2, Alek Manoah set a new franchise record for most consecutive strikeouts with 7.
- Three Blue Jays (Vladimir Guerrero Jr., Marcus Semien, and Teoscar Hernández) were named as starters in the 2021 MLB All-Star game, the most since 1993.
- In their 22–7 victory over the Baltimore Orioles on September 12, Lourdes Gurriel Jr. set a new franchise record for most grand slams in a season with 4.
- They tied the all-time record and became only the ninth team ever (including two past Blue Jays teams) to have 7 players reach 20 home runs for the season (Vladimir Guerrero Jr. – 48, Marcus Semien – 46, Teoscar Hernández – 32, Bo Bichette – 29, Randal Grichuk – 22, George Springer – 22, and Lourdes Gurriel Jr. – 21).
- Marcus Semien set a new all-time season home run record for a 2nd baseman (46).

== Roster ==
2021 Toronto Blue Jays
Roster
Pitchers: 51 Nick Allgeyer; 43 Bryan Baker; 23 Jacob Barnes; 59 Jeremy Beasley; 64 Travis Bergen; 17 José Berríos; 56 Ryan Borucki; 63 Anthony Castro; 34 Tyler Chatwood; 90 Adam Cimber; 36 A. J. Cole; 41 Rafael Dolis; 43 Carl Edwards Jr.; 52 Brad Hand; 31 Thomas Hatch; 47 Anthony Kay; 6 Alek Manoah; 22 Steven Matz; 58 Tim Mayza; 67 Julian Merryweather; 69 Tommy Milone; 66 Patrick Murphy; 44 Connor Overton; 54 Joel Payamps; 24 Nate Pearson; 35 David Phelps; 38 Robbie Ray; 33 Trevor Richards; 14 Tanner Roark; 68 Jordan Romano; 99 Hyun-jin Ryu; 52,54 Tayler Saucedo; 60 Kirby Snead; 28 Joakim Soria; 48 Ross Stripling; 57 Trent Thornton; 60 Ty Tice; 29 T. J. Zeuch	Catchers: 50 Riley Adams; 9 Danny Jansen; 30 Alejandro Kirk; 7 Reese McGuire; Infielders: 11 Bo Bichette; 8 Cavan Biggio; 5 Santiago Espinal; 27 Vladimir Guerrero Jr.; 2 Jake Lamb; 2 Joe Panik; 10 Marcus Semien; 66 Kevin Smith; 44 Rowdy Tellez; 74 Breyvic Valera	Outfielders: 30 Anthony Alford; 3 Jonathan Davis; 14 Corey Dickerson; 1 Jarrod Dyson; 15 Randal Grichuk; 13 Lourdes Gurriel Jr.; 37 Teoscar Hernández; 28 Jared Hoying; 77 Josh Palacios; 4 George Springer; Other batters: 72 Otto Lopez	Manager: 25 Charlie Montoyo; Coaches: 61 Alex Andreopoulos (bullpen catcher); 55 Nevin Ashley (bullpen catcher); 53 Mark Budzinski (first base); 26 Matt Buschmann (bullpen); 19 Dave Hudgens (bench); 16 Gil Kim (coach); 18 Guillermo Martínez (hitting); 20 Luis Rivera (third base); 21 John Schneider (coach); 40 Pete Walker (pitching)

== Farm system ==
(Updated to games played October 3, 2021)

Level	Team	League	Manager	Win–loss record	Position	Postseason	Ref.
Triple-A	Buffalo Bisons	Triple-A East	Casey Candaele	71–46	Northeast Division; 1st place +3 G	Qualified	
Double-A	New Hampshire Fisher Cats	Double-A Northeast	Cesar Martin	52–55	Northeast Division; 3rd place 14 GB	Did not qualify	
High-A	Vancouver Canadians	High-A West	Donnie Murphy	55–64	West Division; 5th place 14 GB	Did not qualify	
Low-A	Dunedin Blue Jays	Low-A Southeast	Luis Hurtado	57–63	West Division; 4th place 18 GB	Did not qualify	
Rookie	FCL Blue Jays	Florida Complex League	Brent Lavallee	25–29	North Division; 3rd place 12 GB	No playoffs were held	
Rookie	DSL Blue Jays	Dominican Summer League	Dane Fujinaka	38–19	Baseball City; 2nd place 1 GB	No playoffs were held	
