= William Henry Sheppard =

African-American missionary for the Presbyterian Church

The Reverend William Henry Sheppard
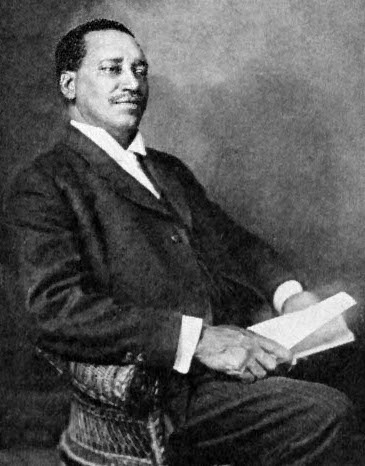
- Sheppard in c. 1917
- Born: March 8, 1865; Waynesboro, Virginia, U.S.
- Died: November 25, 1927 (aged 62); Louisville, Kentucky, U.S.
- Education: Hampton Institute; Tuscaloosa Theological Institute (Stillman College)
- Occupation: Presbyterian missionary
- Known for: Missionary work in the Congo and reporting the exploitation of the Congolese by Leopold II of Belgium

William Henry Sheppard (March 8, 1865 – November 25, 1927) was one of the earliest African Americans to become a missionary for the Presbyterian Church. He spent 20 years in Africa, primarily in and around the Congo Free State, and is best known for his efforts to publicize the atrocities committed against the Kuba and other Congolese peoples by King Leopold II's Force Publique.

Sheppard's efforts contributed to the contemporary debate on European colonialism and imperialism in the region, particularly among those of the African-American community. However, it has been noted that he traditionally received little attention in literature on the subject.

== Early life and education ==
Sheppard was born in Waynesboro, Virginia, on March 8, 1865, to William Henry Sheppard, Sr. and Fannie Frances Sheppard (née Martin), a free "dark mulatto", a month before the end of the American Civil War. No records exist to confirm William Sr.'s status as a slave or freedman, but it has been speculated that he may have been among the slaves forced to serve the Confederacy as Union troops marched upon the South. Sheppard's father was a barber, and his mother was a bath maid in Warm Springs, VA. The family has been described as the closest to middle class that blacks could have achieved given the time and place.

At age 12, William Jr. became a stable boy for a white family several miles away while continuing to attend school; he remembered his two-year stay fondly and maintained written correspondence with the family for many years. Sheppard next worked as a waiter to put himself through the newly created Hampton Institute, where Booker T. Washington was among his instructors in a program that allowed students to work during the day and attend classes at night. A significant influence on his appreciation for native cultures was the "Curiosity Room", in which the school's founder maintained a collection of Native Hawaiian and Native American works of art. Later in life he would collect artifacts from the Congo, specifically those of the Kuba, and bring them back for this room, as evidenced by his letters home, such as "[i]t was on the first of September, 1890 that William H. Sheppard addressed a letter to General Samuel Armstrong, Hampton, From Stanley Pool, Africa, that he had many artifacts, spears, idols, etc., and he was '...saving them for the Curiosity Room at Hampton'".

After graduation, Sheppard was recommended for admittance to Tuscaloosa Theological Institute, present-day Stillman College in Tuscaloosa, Alabama, which in 1959 dedicated its library in Sheppard's honor.) He met Lucy Gantt near the end of his time at Tuscaloosa Theological Institute, and the two became engaged but did not marry until ten years later. Sheppard developed an interest in preaching in Africa, and was supported in this endeavor by Charles Stillman, the institute's founder. The Southern Presbyterian Church, however, had yet to establish its mission in the Congo.

== Career ==
Sheppard was ordained in 1888 and served as pastor at a church in Atlanta, but did not adapt well to the life of an urban black in a heavily segregated area of the Southern United States. For two years he wrote to the Presbyterian Foreign Missionary Board in Baltimore, inquiring about starting a mission in Africa. Frustrated by the vague rationale in the rejection letters he received, Sheppard took a train to Baltimore, where he asked the chairman in person and was politely told that the board would not send a black man to Africa without a white supervisor.

Samuel Lapsley, an eager but inexperienced white man from a wealthy family, intervened to offer his support, enabling Sheppard's journey to Africa. They "inaugurated the unique principle of sending out together, with equal ecclesiastical rights and, as far as possible, in equal numbers, white and colored workers".

=== Mission with Lapsley ===
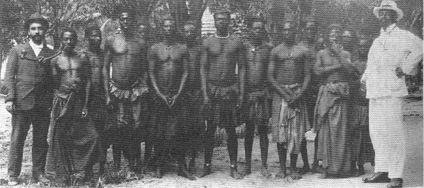
Sheppard (on right)

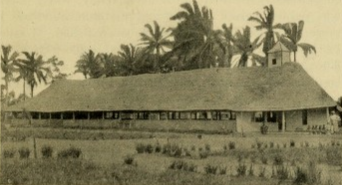
The Lapsley Memorial Church in Ibanche, built after Lapsley died

Sheppard and Lapsley's activities in Africa were enabled by the very man whose atrocities Sheppard would later attempt to expose. The pair traveled to London in 1890 en route to the Congo. While there, Lapsley met General Henry Shelton Sanford, an American ally of King Leopold II and friend of a friend of Lapsley's father. Sanford promised to do "everything in his power" to help the pair, even arranging an audience with King Leopold when Lapsley visited him in Belgium. Neither the secular Sanford nor the Catholic Leopold were interested in the Presbyterians' work. Leopold was eager to make inroads into his newly acquired territory, both to begin the process of "civilizing" the natives and to legitimize his rule. The missionaries were, however, oblivious of Leopold's motives.

The pair made their way to Leopoldville, and Sheppard's own writings as well as Lapsley's letters home suggest Sheppard viewed the natives in a markedly different manner from other foreigners. Sheppard was considered as foreign as Lapsley and even acquired the nickname "Mundele N'dom", or "black white man". Despite being of African descent, Sheppard believed in many of the stereotypes of the time regarding Africa and its inhabitants, such as the idea that African natives were uncivilized or savage. Very quickly though his views changed, as exemplified by a journal entry:

I grew very found of the Bakuba and it was reciprocated. They were the finest looking race I had seen in Africa, dignified, graceful, courageous, honest, with an open smiling countenance really hospitable. Their knowledge of weaving, embroidering, wood-carving and smelting was the highest in equatorial Africa.

The natives' resistance to conversion bothered Lapsley more than Sheppard, as Sheppard viewed himself more as an explorer than a missionary. While Lapsley was on a trip to visit fellow missionary–explorer George Grenfell, Sheppard became familiar with the natives' hunting techniques and languages. He even helped to avert a famine by slaying 36 hippos. Sheppard contracted malaria 22 times in his first two years in Africa.

=== Contact with the Kuba ===
Sheppard became versed in the Kuba language and culture. In 1892, he took a team of men to the edge of the Kuba Kingdom. He originally planned to ask for directions to the next village under the guise of purchasing supplies, but the chief of the village only allowed one of his men to go. Sheppard used a variety of tricks to make his way further into the kingdom, including having a scout follow a group of traders and, most famously, eating so many eggs that the townspeople could no longer supply him and his scout was able to gain access to the next village to find more eggs. Eventually, however, he encountered villagers that would allow him to go no further. While Sheppard was formulating a plan, the king's son, Prince N'toinzide, arrived and arrested Sheppard and his men for trespassing.

King Kot aMweeky, rather than executing Sheppard, told the village that Sheppard was his deceased son. King aMweeky declared Sheppard "Bope Mekabe", which spared the lives of Sheppard and his men. This was a political move on the part of the king; in danger of being overthrown, he encouraged interest in the strangers to direct attention away from himself. During his stay in the village, Sheppard collected artifacts from the people and he eventually secured permission for a Presbyterian mission. The king allowed him to leave on the condition that he return in one year. He would be unable to do so for several years, however, by which time Kot aMweeky had been overthrown by Mishaape, the leader of a rival clan.

=== Documentation of Congo Free State atrocities ===
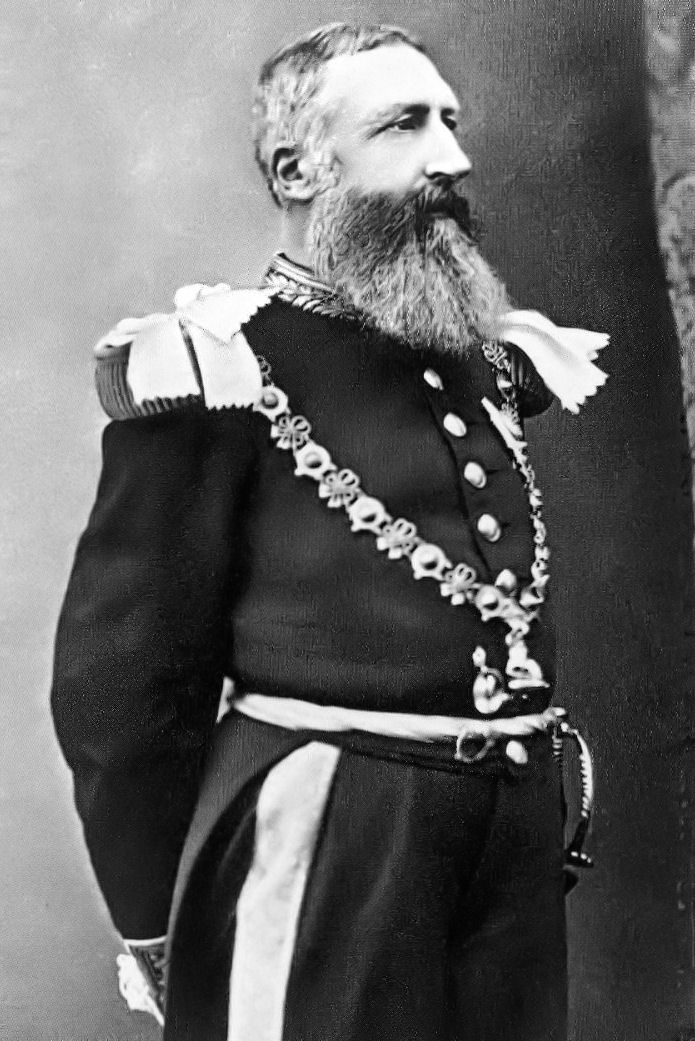
Leopold II of Belgium

In the late 19th century, King Leopold II started to receive criticism for his treatment of the natives in Congo Free State. In the United States, the main outlet of this criticism was the Presbyterian church. In 1891, Sheppard became involved with William Morrison after Lapsley's death. They would report the crimes they saw, and later, with the help of Roger Casement, would form the Congo Reform Association (CRA), one of the world's first humanitarian organizations.

In January 1900, The New York Times published a report that said 14 villages had been burned and 90 or more of the local people killed in the Bena Kamba country by Zappo Zap warriors sent to collect taxes by the Congo Free State administration. The report was based on letters from Southern Presbyterian missionaries Rev. L. C. Vass and Rev. H. P. Hawkins stationed at Luebo and the subsequent investigation by Sheppard who visited the Zappo Zaps' camp. Apparently taken for a government official, he was openly shown the bodies of many of the victims. Sheppard saw evidence of cannibalism.

He counted 81 right hands that had been cut off and were being dried before being taken to show the State officers what the Zappo Zaps had achieved. He also found 60 women confined in a pen. Sheppard documented his findings using a Kodak camera, taking a picture of three mutilated men and one of the captive women. The massacre caused an uproar against Dufour and the Congo Free State itself. When Mark Twain published his King Leopold's Soliloquy five years later, he mentioned Sheppard by name and referred to his account of the massacre.

In January 1908, Sheppard published a report on colonial abuses in the American Presbyterian Congo Mission (APCM) newsletter, and both he and Morrison were sued for libel against the Kasai Rubber Company (Compagnie de Kasai), a Belgian rubber contractor in the area. The case went to court in September 1909, and the two missionaries were supported by the CRA, American Progressives, and their lawyer, Emile Vandervelde, who was a Belgian socialist. The judge acquitted Sheppard on the premise that his editorial had not named the major company, but smaller charter companies instead. However, it is likely that the case was decided in favor of Sheppard as a result of international politics; the U.S., socially supportive of missionaries, had questioned the validity of King Leopold II's rule in the Congo. Morrison had been acquitted earlier on a technicality.

Sheppard's reports often portrayed actions by the state that broke laws set by the European nations. Many of the documented cases of cruelty or violence were in direct violation of the Berlin Act of 1885, which gave Leopold II control over the Congo as long as he "care[d] for the improvements of their conditions of their moral and material well-being" and "help[ed] in suppressing slavery."

== Louisville ==
He was the pastor at Grace Presbyterian Church in Louisville, Kentucky, from 1912 until his death in 1927. He was a leader in Smoketown. Sheppard Park was named for him in 1924 and the Sheppard Square Housing Project in 1942.

== Legacy ==
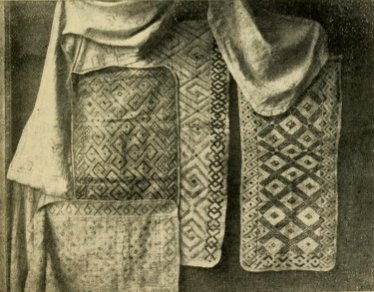
A sample of the Bakuba cloth. Artifacts such as these aided Sheppard in learning the culture of the society, which placed an emphasis on cleanliness.

Sheppard suffered a stroke in 1926, and died on November 25, 1927, in Louisville, Kentucky. His efforts contributed to the contemporary debate on European colonialism and imperialism in the region, particularly among the African-American community. However, historians have noted that he has traditionally received little recognition for his contributions.

Over the course of his journeys, Sheppard amassed a sizable collection of Kuba art, much of which he donated to his alma mater, Hampton University, which has his collection on display at the Hampton University Museum. He was possibly the first African-American collector of African art. This art collection was notable because it "acquired the art objects in Africa, from Africans at all levels in their society...in the context of their daily existence" and, as a whole, Kuba art is considered "one of the most highly developed of African visual art forms...." The collection, as a whole, is quite large; from the time of his arrival to Congo Free State in 1890 until his final departure 20 years later, in 1910, Sheppard was collecting art and artifacts from the cultures around him.

Sheppard's collection was also useful to ethnologists of the time because the Kuba culture was not well known by the outside world, even by those well-versed with African studies. For example, the collection does not feature a large number of carved human figures or any figurine that could be connected to a deity of some sort. That could be taken as evidence that the Kuba either had no religion or had one that was not outwardly expressed through art. On the issue of the collection's scientific value, Jane E. Davis of the Southern Workman journal wrote that "it not only meets the requirements of the ethnologists, but those of the artist as well. Already it has been used by scientists to establish the origins of the culture of the Bakuba tribe."

== See also ==
- George Washington Williams
- Presbytery of Sheppards and Lapsley
