= Iowa Hawkeyes baseball =

Iowa Hawkeyes
- 2026 Iowa Hawkeyes baseball team
- Founded: 1890 (136 years ago)
- University: University of Iowa
- Head coach: Rick Heller (13th season)
- Conference: Big Ten
- Location: Iowa City, Iowa
- Home stadium: Duane Banks Field (capacity: 3,000)
- Nickname: Hawkeyes
- Colors: Black and gold

College World Series appearances
- 1972

NCAA tournament appearances
- 1972, 1975, 1990, 2015, 2017, 2023

Conference tournament champions
- 2017

Conference regular season champions
- 1927 1938, 1939, 1942, 1949, 1972, 1974, 1990

The Iowa Hawkeyes baseball program represents the University of Iowa in college baseball. The program started in 1890. It is a member of the Big Ten Conference and is the only NCAA Division I baseball program in the state of Iowa.

== Record by year ==
This is a table of the Iowa Hawkeyes record year-by-year. Starting with the 1981 season the Big Ten tournament winner was declared conference champion. It also marked the first season of East and West divisions in the conference. They lasted through the 1987 season. Starting in 1993 the regular season winner was once again recognized as the conference champion. The Big Ten tournament was used to determine the NCAA automatic qualifier only.

Chicago sponsored baseball from 1896 through 1944 and again in 1946 before leaving the conference after the 1946 season. In 1951 Michigan State joined the conference, giving it ten schools sponsoring baseball. From 1896 through the 1991 season Wisconsin sponsored baseball. It dropped the sport after that season. Starting with the 1992 season Penn State joined the conference, once more bringing the conference up to ten baseball sponsoring members. In 2012 Nebraska began play in the conference, giving it 11 schools sponsoring baseball. Maryland and Rutgers joined the Big Ten as well in 2014 and participated in the 2015 season, bringing the total number of baseball programs to 13. In 2024, Oregon, UCLA, USC, and Washington joined the Big Ten and participated in the 2025 season, bringing the total number of baseball programs to 17.

Record table
Season	Coach	Overall	Conference	Standing	Postseason
Iowa (Independent) (1890–1905)
1890		2–1–0			
1891		3–0–0			
1892		2–1–0			
1893		3–9–0			
1894		N/A			
1895		6–7–0			
1896		5–2–0			
1897		6–6–0			
1898		5–2–1			
1899		5–6–1			
1900	Alden Knipe	13–2–0			
1901	Alden Knipe	12–6–0			
1902	S. C. Williams	7–13–0			
1903	S. C. Williams	11–7–0			
1904	John Chalmers	12–4–0			
1905	John Chalmers	12–2–0			
Iowa (Big Ten Conference) (1906–present)
1906		9–5–0	0–2–0	8th	
1907		8–4–0	0–2–0	8th	
1908		7–9–0	0–6–0	6th	
1909		9–3–0	N/A	N/A	
1910		8–6–0	2–4–0	7th	
1911		9–9–0	2–5–0	7th	
1912		7–3–1	1–3?–0	6th	
1913		?–?–?	1–5–0	8th	
1914		?–?–?	2–3–0	T–7th	
1915		?–?–?	4–3–0	4th	
1916		?–?–?	2–4–0	7th	
1917		?–?–?	3–5–0	5th	
1918		?–?–?	2–3–0	5th	
1919		?–?–?	5–3–0	3rd	
1920		?–?–?	4–2–0	3rd	
1921		?–?–?	2–8–0	8th	
1922		?–?–?	4–6–0	6th	
1923		?–?–?	4–4–0	6th	
1924		?–?–?	4–7–0	8th	
1925		?–?–?	6–5–0	T–5th	
1926		?–?–?	2–8–0	10th	
1927		?–?–?	7–3–0	T–1st	
1928		?–?–?	6–5–0	T–6th	
1929		?–?–?	7–3–0	2nd	
1930		?–?–?	N/A	N/A	
1931		?–?–?	1–8–0	9th	
1932		?–?–?	3–2–0	5th	
1933		?–?–?	3–2–0	T–4th	
1934		?–?–?	5–6–0	T–5th	
1935		?–?–?	3–7–0	8th	
1936		?–?–?	8–2–0	3rd	
1937	Otto Vogel	13–15–0	5–7–0	8th	
1938	Otto Vogel	12–12–0	7–3–0	T–1st	
1939	Otto Vogel	19–5–0	8–3–0	1st	
1940	Otto Vogel	20–3–1	8–3–0	3rd	
1941	Otto Vogel	22–6–0	9–3–0	2nd	
1942	Otto Vogel	15–2–1	10–2–0	T–1st	
1943	J. E. Davis	8–4–0	6–4–0	5th	
1944	J. E. Davis	3–5–0	3–4–0	8th	
1945	J. E. Davis	4–6–0	3–5–0	8th	
1946	Otto Vogel	11–6–0	6–3–0	T–3rd	
1947	Otto Vogel	13–11–1	6–6–0	5th	
1948	Otto Vogel	15–12–0	5–6–0	T–5th	
1949	Otto Vogel	14–8–0	8–4–0	T–1st	
1950	Otto Vogel	19–6–0	8–3–0	3rd	
1951	Otto Vogel	11–13–0	4–8–0	T–8th	
1952	Otto Vogel	12–14–0	5–8–0	9th	
1953	Otto Vogel	15–10–1	8–4–0	4th	
1954	Otto Vogel	10–15–1	5–10–0	7th	
1955	Otto Vogel	6–18–0	3–10–0	T–9th	
1956	Otto Vogel	11–16–1	5–8–0	7th	
1957	Otto Vogel	9–10–0	7–4–0	T–2nd	
1958	Otto Vogel	9–19–2	3–12–0	10th	
1959	Otto Vogel	10–18–1	5–9–0	9th	
1960	Otto Vogel	7–17–0	3–8–0	10th	
1961	Otto Vogel	8–16–0	4–9–0	8th	
1962	Otto Vogel	13–16–1	5–9–0	T–7th	
1963	Dick Schultz	20–9–0	9–5–0	2nd	
1964	Dick Schultz	13–16–1	7–8–0	T–7th	
1965	Dick Schultz	13–12–0	7–5–0	4th	
1966	Dick Schultz	14–15–0	4–7–0	8th	
1967	Dick Schultz	19–12–1	8–9–0	5th	
1968	Dick Schultz	19–11–1	4–9–0	9th	
1969	Dick Schultz	21–24–0	7–11–0	T–8th	
1970	Dick Schultz & Duane Banks	24–22–0	6–11–0	9th	
1971	Duane Banks	28–17–0	10–8–0	T–4th	
1972	Duane Banks	25–17–0	13–3–0	1st	NCAA CWS
1973	Duane Banks	16–14–1	8–10–0	T–7th	
1974	Duane Banks	27–13–0	11–4–0	T–1st	
1975	Duane Banks	29–14–0	11–3–0	2nd	NCAA Regional
1976	Duane Banks	23–16–0	9–7–0	T–5th	
1977	Duane Banks	40–14–0	10–8–0	T–4th	
1978	Duane Banks	28–27–0	9–6–0	4th	
1979	Duane Banks	32–12–0	10–6–0	5th	
1980	Duane Banks	31–14–0	11–5–0	3rd	
1981	Duane Banks	44–21–0	8–6–0	3rd (West)	
1982	Duane Banks	31–23–0	5–11–0	5th (West)	
1983	Duane Banks	32–21–1	7–7–0	2nd (West)	
1984	Duane Banks	31–26–0	7–8–0	3rd (West)	
1985	Duane Banks	40–20–0	9–7–0	T–2nd (West)	
1986	Duane Banks	29–27–0	2–13–0	5th (West)	
1987	Duane Banks	29–28–0	9–7–0	T–2nd (West)	
1988	Duane Banks	29–25–0	14–14–0	6th	
1989	Duane Banks	37–20–0	17–11–0	T–2nd	
1990	Duane Banks	38–19–0	22–6–0	1st	NCAA Regional
1991	Duane Banks	26–28–1	11–17–0	9th	
1992	Duane Banks	26–28–0	12–16–0	7th	
1993	Duane Banks	32–20–0	13–13–0	6th	
1994	Duane Banks	22–34–1	13–15–0	T–3rd	
1995	Duane Banks	29–24–0	13–15–0	7th	
1996	Duane Banks	32–20–0	13–13–0	7th	
1997	Duane Banks	17–30–0	7–16–0	10th	
1998	Scott Broghamer	19–27–0	9–15–0	T–6th	
1999	Scott Broghamer	22–34–0	6–22–0	10th	
2000	Scott Broghamer	19–35–0	11–17–0	T–7th	
2001	Scott Broghamer	19–29–0	8–17–0	T–9th	
2002	Scott Broghamer	26–29–1	15–16–0	5th	
2003	Scott Broghamer	18–29–0	10–21–0	10th	
2004	Jack Dahm	20–35–0	12–20–0	8th	
2005	Jack Dahm	28–29–0	19–13–0	3rd	
2006	Jack Dahm	23–33–0	12–20–0	9th	
2007	Jack Dahm	31–23–0	17–13–0	4th	
2008	Jack Dahm	22–33–0	10–22–0	10th	
2009	Jack Dahm	16–35–0	4–19–0	10th	
2010	Jack Dahm	30–28–0	13–11–0	T–3rd	
2011	Jack Dahm	20–32–0	9–15–0	9th	
2012	Jack Dahm	23–27–0	10–14–0	9th	
2013	Jack Dahm	22–27–0	10–14–0	8th	
2014	Rick Heller	30–23–0	10-14–0	T–7th	
2015	Rick Heller	41–18–0	19–5–0	2nd	NCAA Regional
2016	Rick Heller	30–26–0	12–12–0	T-8th	
2017	Rick Heller	38–20–0	15–9–0	T-4th	NCAA Regional
2018	Rick Heller	33–20–0	13–9–0	6th	
2019	Rick Heller	31–24–0	12–12–0	T-6th	
2020	Rick Heller	10–5–0	(Note: Big Ten Play was canceled due to the COVID-19 pandemic.)	(Note: Big Ten Play/Tournament was canceled due to the COVID-19 pandemic.)	(Note: The 2020 NCAA baseball tournament was canceled due to the COVID-19 pandemic.)
2021	Rick Heller	26–18–0	26–18–0	T-4th	
2022	Rick Heller	36–19–0	17–7–0	T-2nd	
2023	Rick Heller	43–14–0	15–8–0	3rd	NCAA Regional
2024	Rick Heller	31–23–0	14–10–0	4th	
2025	Rick Heller	33–22–1	21–9–0	3rd	
2026	Rick Heller	33-23-0	15-15-0	8th	
Total:		2384–1967–29			
National champion Postseason invitational champion Conference regular season champion Conference regular season and conference tournament champion Division regular season champion Division regular season and conference tournament champion Conference tournament champion

== Head coaching history ==
#	Name	Years	Record	Win %
N/A	None	1890–1899	37–34–2	.521
1	Alden Knipe	1900–1901	25–8–0	.758
2	S. C. Williams	1902–1903	18–20–0	.474
3	John Chalmers	1904–1905	24–6–0	.800
4	John G. Griffith	1906–1906	9–5–0	.643
5	L. J. Storey	1907–1907	8–4–0	.667
6	Maury Kent	1908–1908	7–9–0	.438
7	Charles Kirk	1909–1909	9–3–0	.750
8	Ted Green	1910–1910	8–6–0	.571
9	Walter Stewart	1911–1912	16–12–1	.569
10	Viva Lindeman	1913–1913	8–8–0	.500
11	Maury Kent	1914–1918	42–26–3	.613
12	Howard Jones	1919–1919	10–6–0	.625
13	James N. Ashmore	1920–1922	23–20–1	.534
14	Sam Barry	1923–1924	19–15–0	.559
15	Otto Vogel	1925–1942	247–146–5	.627
16	J. E. Davis	1943–1945	15–15–0	.500
17	Otto Vogel	1946–1962	193–236–8	.451
18	Dick Schultz	1963–1970	129–106–3	.548
19	Duane Banks	1970–1997	810–575–4	.585
20	Scott Broghamer	1998–2003	123–183–1	.402
21	Jack Dahm	2004–2013	215–270	.443
22	Rick Heller	2014–present	402-251–1	.615

== Big Ten Conference tournaments ==
Iowa has made 16 appearances in the Big Ten Conference tournament. They appeared in 1983, 1987, 1989, 1990, 2002, 2005, 2007, 2010, 2015, 2016, 2017, 2018, 2019, 2022, 2023, 2024, and 2025. They have an overall record of 24–31–0, with a championship in 2017.

Big Ten Conference Tournaments
Season	Seed	Tournament Location	Eliminated Round	Teams Defeated	Lost to
1983	2W	Ray Fischer Stadium; Ann Arbor, MI	Tournament Championship	(2E) Michigan State (1W) Minnesota	(1E) Michigan X2
1987	2W	Ray Fischer Stadium; Ann Arbor, MI	Elimination Bracket Final	(1E) Michigan	(2E) Purdue (1E) Michigan
1989	2	Ray Fischer Stadium; Ann Arbor, MI	Elimination Bracket First Round		(3) Illinois (4) Ohio State
1990	1	Duane Banks Field; Iowa City, IA	Elimination Bracket Final	(4) Ohio State	(2) Illinois (4) Ohio State
2002	5	Siebert Field; Minneapolis, MN	Elimination Bracket First Round		(4) Indiana (3) Michigan State
2005	3	Illinois Field; Champaign, IL	Elimination Bracket First Round		(6) Minnesota (4) Michigan
2007	4	Ray Fischer Stadium; Ann Arbor, MI	Elimination Bracket First Round		(5) Illinois (6) Penn State
2010	4	Huntington Park; Columbus, OH	Tournament Championship	(5) Purdue X 2 (2) Michigan	(2) Michigan (1) Minnesota
2015	2	Target Field; Minneapolis, MN	Elimination Bracket Second Round	(7) Ohio State	(3) Michigan (6) Indiana
2016	8	TD Ameritrade Park Omaha; Omaha, NE	Tournament Championship	(1) Minnesota (4) Ohio State (6) Maryland	(4) Ohio State
2017	5	Bart Kaufman Field; Bloomington, IN	Tournament Champion	(5) Maryland (1) Nebraska (3) Minnesota (7) Northwestern	
2018	6	TD Ameritrade Park Omaha; Omaha, NE	Elimination Bracket First Round		(3) Michigan (7) Ohio State
2019	8	TD Ameritrade Park Omaha; Omaha, NE	Elimination Bracket Second Round	(1) Indiana	(5) Nebraska (4) Minnesota
2022	3	Charles Schwab Field Omaha; Omaha, NE	Tournament Semifinal	(7) Purdue (6) Penn State (5) Michigan	(6) Penn State (5) Michigan
2023	3	Charles Schwab Field Omaha; Omaha, NE	Tournament Championship	(6) Michigan X 2 (2) Indiana	(1) Maryland
2024	5	Charles Schwab Field Omaha; Omaha, NE	Elimination Bracket First Round		(4) Michigan (1) Illinois
2025	3	Charles Schwab Field Omaha; Omaha, NE	Tournament Semifinal	(10) Rutgers	(6) Indiana (2) UCLA
2026	8	Charles Schwab Field Omaha; Omaha, NE	Double Elimination Round	(9) Illinois	(12) Michigan State (5) Purdue

== NCAA tournament regional and district rounds ==
The number in parentheses next to the team name represents that teams seed in the regional portion of the bracket.

Season	Seed	Region	Eliminated Round	Teams Defeated	Lost to
1972	N/A	District 4	Advanced to College World Series	Northern Illinois; Central Michigan; Bowling Green X 2	Central Michigan
1975	N/A	Midwest	First Round	-	Tulsa; Texas A&M
1990	3	Northeast	Second Round	-	(4) Maine (1) North Carolina
2015	2	Springfield	Regional Final	(3) Oregon X 2	(1) Missouri St X 2
2017	4	Houston	Regional	(1) Houston	(3) Texas A & M (1) Houston
2023	2	Terre Haute	Regional Final	(3) North Carolina X 2	(1) Indiana State X 2

== NCAA College World Series ==
Season	Seed	Region	Eliminated Round	Teams Defeated	Lost to
1972	N/A	-	First Round	-	Arizona State; Temple

== Final poll rankings ==
This is a table of Iowa's ranking in the Collegiate Baseball Division I Final Polls.

Season	Ranking
1963	#25
1972	#7
1974	#17
1975	#27

== Big Ten ==
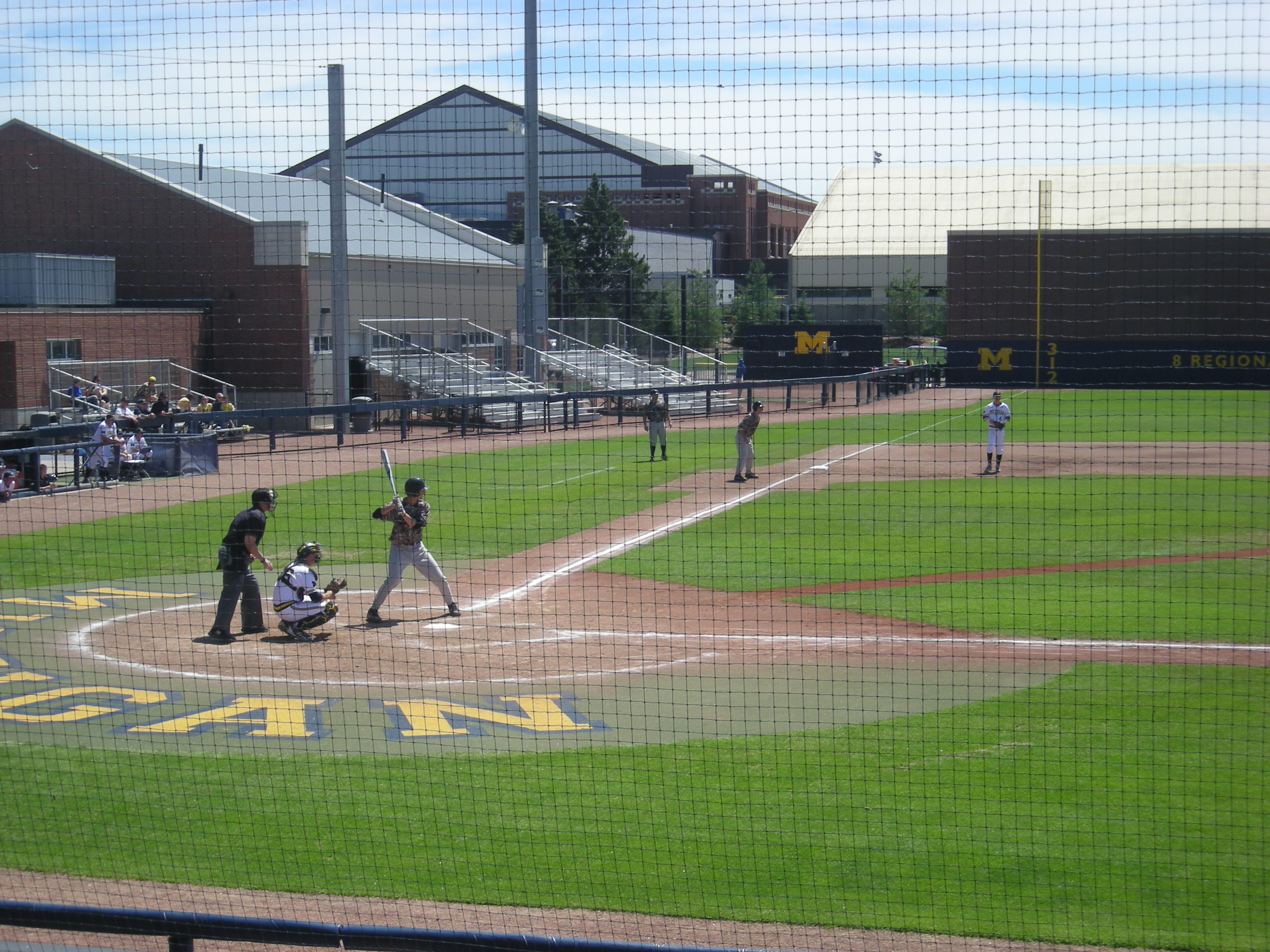
Iowa playing against Michigan in Ann Arbor during the 2013 season.

- Note: Teams in italics are no longer in the conference or no longer sponsor baseball. Records are through April 2026. Records reflect all-time records against members, not only in conference play.

School	Record
Chicago	25–19–1
Illinois	96–132–2
Indiana	94–81–0
Maryland	12-10-0
Michigan	62–124–0
Michigan State	77–85–1
Minnesota	134–188–0
Nebraska	32–31–0
Northwestern	150–109–2
Ohio State	94–83–1
Oregon	2-3-0
Penn State	42–43–0
Purdue	110–73–1
Rutgers	14-9-0
UCLA	0-4-0
USC	2-6-0
Washington	1-2-0
Wisconsin	69–71–0

== Rivals ==
School	Record
Drake	21–3–0
Iowa State	59–63–1
Northern Iowa	68–24–1

== Notable players ==
- Mike Boddicker – Drafted in the 6th round during the 1978 January Draft by the Baltimore Orioles. Was the 1983 ALCS MVP, World Series Champion with the 1983 Orioles, 1984 All-Star and 1990 Gold Glove Award.
- Jack Bruner – Played for the Chicago White Sox and St. Louis Browns.
- Tim Costo – Drafted in the 1st round (8th overall) during the 1990 MLB draft by the Cleveland Indians. Also played for the Cincinnati Reds.
- Jim Cox – Drafted in the 1st round (2nd overall) during the 1972 January Secondary Draft by the Montreal Expos.
- Jack Dittmer – Was named to the 1949 College Baseball All-America Team. Played for the Boston Braves/Milwaukee Braves and Detroit Tigers. Inducted into the University of Iowa Athletics Hall of Fame in 1993.
- Cal Eldred – Drafted in the 1st round (17th overall) during the 1989 MLB draft by the Milwaukee Brewers. Played Major League baseball from 1991 to 2005 (15 seasons). Also played for the Chicago White Sox and St. Louis Cardinals.
- Bob Gebhard – Drafted in the 44th round during the 1965 Major League Baseball draft by the Minnesota Twins. Also played for the Montreal Expos.
- Chris Hatcher – Drafted in the 3rd round during the 1990 MLB draft by the Houston Astros. Also played for the Kansas City Royals and Lotte Giants of the KBO.
- Bill Heckroth – First Team All-Big Ten pitcher in 1972. Served in Iowa Senate from 2007 to 2011.
- Danan Hughes – Drafted in the 3rd round of the 1992 MLB draft by the Milwaukee Brewers. Also drafted in the 7th round of the 1993 NFL draft by the Kansas City Chiefs.
- Jeff Jones – Drafted in the 20th round during the 1979 MLB draft by the Cincinnati Reds.
- Jim McAndrew – Drafted in the 11th round during the 1965 MLB draft by the New York Mets. World Series Champion with the 1969 Mets. Also played for the San Diego Padres. His nickname during his playing days was "The Pride of a Lost Nation, Iowa".
- Wes Obermueller – Drafted in the 2nd round during the 1999 MLB draft by the Kansas City Royals. Also played for the Milwaukee Brewers, Florida Marlins, Orix Buffaloes of the NPB and Samsung Lions of the KBO.
- Bo Porter – Drafted in the 40th round during the 1993 MLB draft by the Chicago Cubs. Also played for the Oakland Athletics and Texas Rangers. Manager of the Houston Astros from 2013 to 2014.
- Jim Sundberg – Drafted in the 1st round (2nd overall) during the 1973 January Secondary Draft by the Texas Rangers. Was a 3× All-Star, 6× Gold Glove Award winner, World Series Champion with the 1985 Royals and in the Texas Rangers Hall of Fame. Also played for the Milwaukee Brewers and Chicago Cubs.
- Mason McCoy – Drafted in the 6th round (188th overall) during the 2017 MLB draft by the Baltimore Orioles. Made Major League Baseball debut for the Toronto Blue Jays. Also played for the San Diego Padres.
- Nick Allgeyer – Drafted in the 12th round during the 2018 MLB draft by the Toronto Blue Jays. Made Major League Baseball debut pitching a perfect ninth inning on July 2, 2021.
- Tyler Cropley – Drafted in the 8th round (251st overall) during the 2018 MLB draft by the Washington Nationals. Made Major League Baseball debut for the Kansas City Royals in 2023.
- Adam Mazur – Drafted as the 53rd overall pick in the 2022 MLB draft by the San Diego Padres. In 8 starts for San Diego, Mazur had a 7.49 ERA with 22 strikeouts across 33+2/3 innings pitched. Mazur was traded to Miami Marlins on July 30, 2024.
- Jack Dreyer – Signed as an undrafted free agent by the Los Angeles Dodgers in August 2021. Made his Major League Baseball debut for the Dodgers in 2025.

== See also ==
- List of NCAA Division I baseball programs
