= William Morrison (missionary) =

American Presbyterian missionary

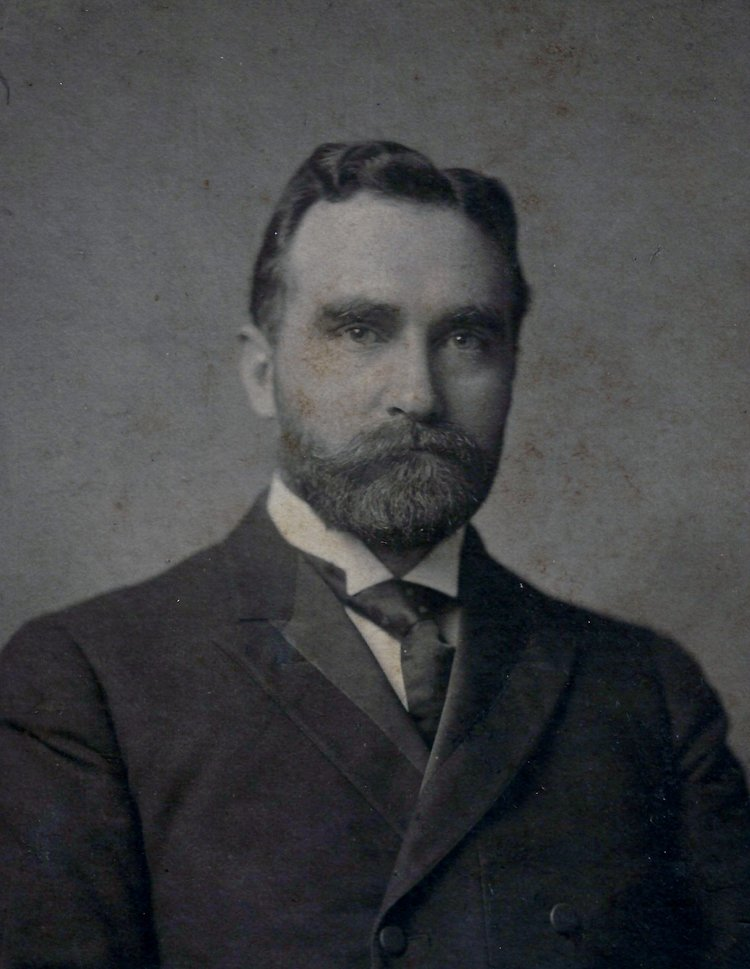
William McCutchan Morrison

William McCutchan Morrison (1867–1918) was an American Presbyterian missionary best known for his involvement with a campaign for reform in the Congo. He was born on November 10, 1867, near Lexington, Virginia, and graduated in 1887 from Washington and Lee University.

He also studied at the Presbyterian Theological Seminary at Louisville and graduated in 1895; he was sent to the American Presbyterian Congo Mission, where he worked on developing a writing system for the widely spoken Tshiluba language. He published the Grammar and Dictionary of the Buluba-Lulua Language in 1906.

Morrison (with E. D. Morel) publicly denounced the exploitation perpetrated by King Leopold II’s regime in the Congo. In 1909 he and William H. Sheppard were sued for libel by the government-controlled Kasai Rubber Company; their acquittal led to reforms.

== Family ==
Morrison was married to Bertha Stebbins. They are both buried in the church cemetery at Luebo.
