= Otto Vogel =

American baseball player (1899–1969)

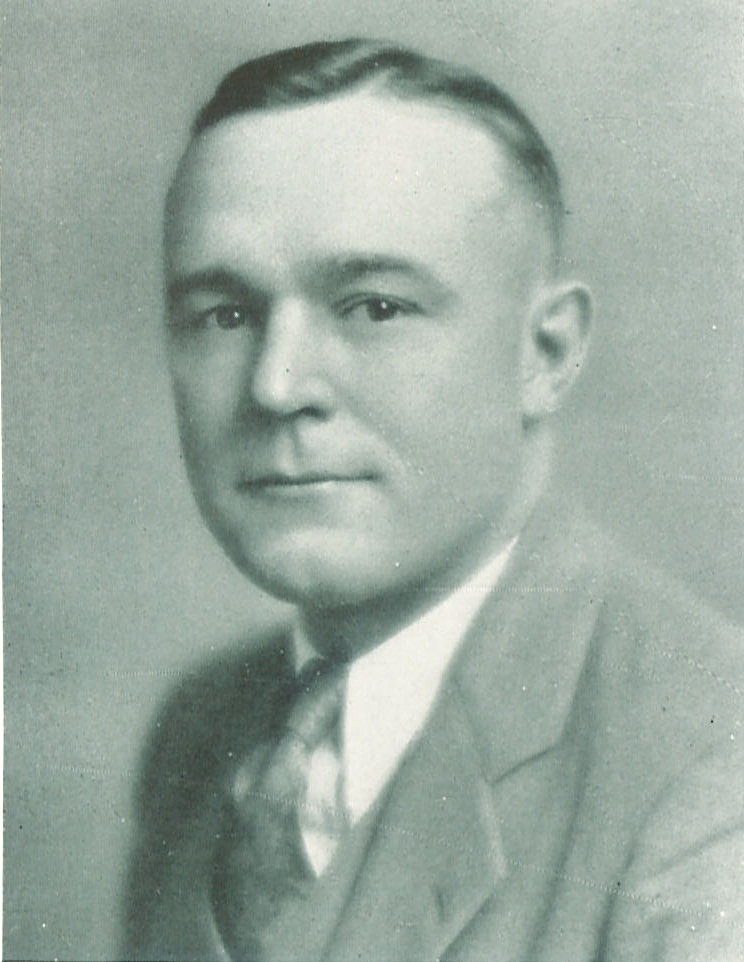
- Rightfielder
- Born: October 26, 1899; Mendota, Illinois, U.S.
- Died: July 19, 1969 (aged 69); Iowa City, Iowa, U.S.
- Batted: Right Threw: Right

MLB debut
- June 5, 1923, for the Chicago Cubs

Last MLB appearance
- September 29, 1924, for the Chicago Cubs

MLB statistics
- Batting average: .249
- Home runs: 2
- Runs batted in: 30
- Stats at Baseball Reference

Teams
- As player: Chicago Cubs (1923–1924); As coach: Iowa Hawkeyes baseball (1925–1942,1946–1966)

Career highlights and awards
- 5× Big Ten Conference baseball champions (1927, 1938, 1939, 1942, 1949)

Otto Henry Vogel (October 26, 1899 – July 19, 1969) was an American Major League Baseball player. Vogel played for the Chicago Cubs in the 1923 and 1924 seasons. in 111 career games, Vogel had 63 hits in 253 at-bats, with a .249 batting average.

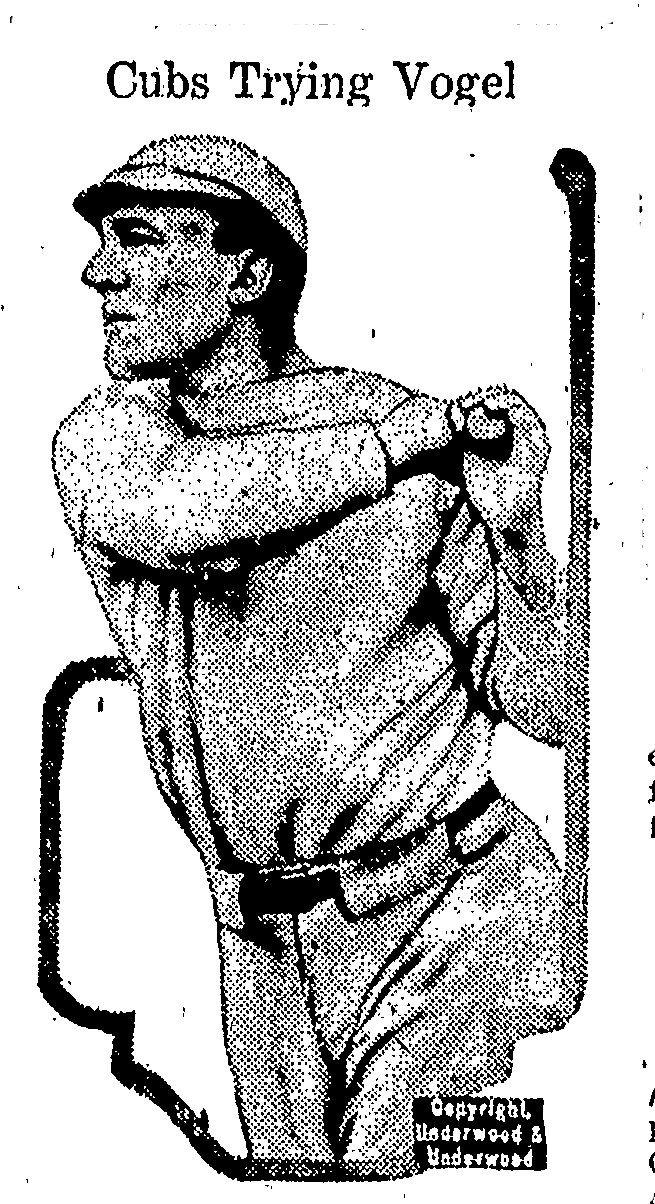
Vogel playing with the Cubs.

Besides baseball, Vogel attended the University of Illinois and played basketball from 1920–1922. Vogel received the Big Ten Medal of Honor for his proficiency in athletics and scholastic work.

Head baseball coach at Iowa for 39 years; coach of Big Ten championship teams in 1927, 1938, 1939, 1942, 1949, runner-up in 1929, 1941, 1957, 1963 and eleven Major League Baseball players; career record of 505–431–14 (.540); president of National Association of College Baseball Coaches in 1953; author of textbook “The Ins and Outs of Baseball” published in 1951; and member of College Baseball Hall of Fame of Helms Athletic Foundation.

He was born in Mendota, Illinois and died in Iowa City, Iowa.
