= Rick Heller =

American college baseball coach

Current position
- Title: Head coach
- Team: Iowa
- Conference: Big Ten
- Record: 384–223–1 (.632)

Playing career
- 1982–1986: Upper Iowa
- Position: Shortstop

Coaching career (HC unless noted)
- 1987: Bakersfield HS (MO)
- 1988–1999: Upper Iowa
- 2000–2009: Northern Iowa
- 2010–2013: Indiana State
- 2014–present: Iowa

Head coaching record
- Overall: 1,074–796–5 (.574)
- Tournaments: NCAA: 5–6; MVC: 7–7; Big Ten: 14–13

Accomplishments and honors

Championships
- 4 IIAC (1993, 1995,–1997); 1 MVC Tournament (2001); 1 MVC regular season (2012); 1 Big Ten Tournament (2017)

Awards
- 4× IIAC Coach of the Year (1989, 1993, 1995, 1996); MVC Coach of the Year (2012)

Rick Heller is an American college baseball coach and former shortstop, who is the current head baseball coach of the Iowa Hawkeyes. Heller played college baseball at Upper Iowa for head coach Bill Prochaska from 1982 to 1986. He then served as the head coach for the Upper Iowa Peacocks (1988–1999), the Northern Iowa Panthers (2000–2009) and the Indiana State Sycamores (2010–2013). He has been the head coach at the University of Iowa since 2014.

== Head coaching record ==
Below is a table of Heller's yearly records as a collegiate head baseball coach.

Record table
Season	Team	Overall	Conference	Standing	Postseason
Upper Iowa Peacocks (Iowa Intercollegiate Athletic Conference – DIII) (1988–1999)
1988	Upper Iowa	7–30			
1989	Upper Iowa	10–23			
1990	Upper Iowa	19–17			
1991	Upper Iowa	22–13			
1992	Upper Iowa	23–16			
1993	Upper Iowa	21–15–1		1st	NCAA regional
1994	Upper Iowa	21–18–1			
1995	Upper Iowa	31–13		1st	NCAA regional
1996	Upper Iowa	37–14		1st	College World Series
1997	Upper Iowa	30–14			
1998	Upper Iowa	38–8			
1999	Upper Iowa	30–15–1		3rd	
Upper Iowa:		289–194–3			
Northern Iowa Panthers (Missouri Valley Conference) (2000–2009)
2000	Northern Iowa	23–33	9–22	9th	
2001	Northern Iowa	35–28	17–15	5th	NCAA regional
2002	Northern Iowa	30–25–1	14–18	6th	MVC Tournament
2003	Northern Iowa	27–28	16–15	4th	MVC Tournament
2004	Northern Iowa	25–31	12–20	T–5th	
2005	Northern Iowa	26–28	9–15	T–8th	
2006	Northern Iowa	28–27	10–14	T–7th	
2007	Northern Iowa	23–28	8–16	T–6th	
2008	Northern Iowa	30–24	14–10	4th	MVC Tournament
2009	Northern Iowa	23–26	7–15	7th	
Northern Iowa:		270–278–1	116–160		
Indiana State Sycamores (Missouri Valley Conference) (2010–2013)
2010	Indiana State	35–19	10–10	T–3rd	MVC Tournament
2011	Indiana State	29–28	8–13	6th	MVC Tournament
2012	Indiana State	41–19	14–7	1st	NCAA regional
2013	Indiana State	26–25	9–11	6th	MVC Tournament
Indiana State:		131–91	41–41		
Iowa Hawkeyes (Big Ten Conference) (2014–present)
2014	Iowa	30–23	10–14	T–7th	Big Ten Tournament
2015	Iowa	41–18	19–5	2nd	NCAA regional
2016	Iowa	30–26	12–12	T–8th	Big Ten Tournament
2017	Iowa	39–20	15–9	T–4th	NCAA regional
2018	Iowa	33–19	13–9	6th	Big Ten Tournament
2019	Iowa	31–24	12–12	T-6th	Big Ten Tournament
2020	Iowa	10–5	0–0		Season canceled due to COVID-19
2021	Iowa	26–18	26–18	T-4th	
2022	Iowa	36–19	17–7	T-2nd	Big Ten Tournament
2023	Iowa	44–16	15–8	3rd	NCAA regional
2024	Iowa	31–23	14–10	5th	Big Ten Tournament
2025	Iowa	33-22–1	21-9	3rd	Big Ten Tournament
Iowa:		384–233–1	174–113		
Total:		1,074–796–5 (.574)			
National champion Postseason invitational champion Conference regular season champion Conference regular season and conference tournament champion Division regular season champion Division regular season and conference tournament champion Conference tournament champion

== See also ==
- List of current NCAA Division I baseball coaches
