= First Presbyterian Church (Birmingham, Alabama) =

Historic church in Alabama, United States

- U.S. National Register of Historic Places
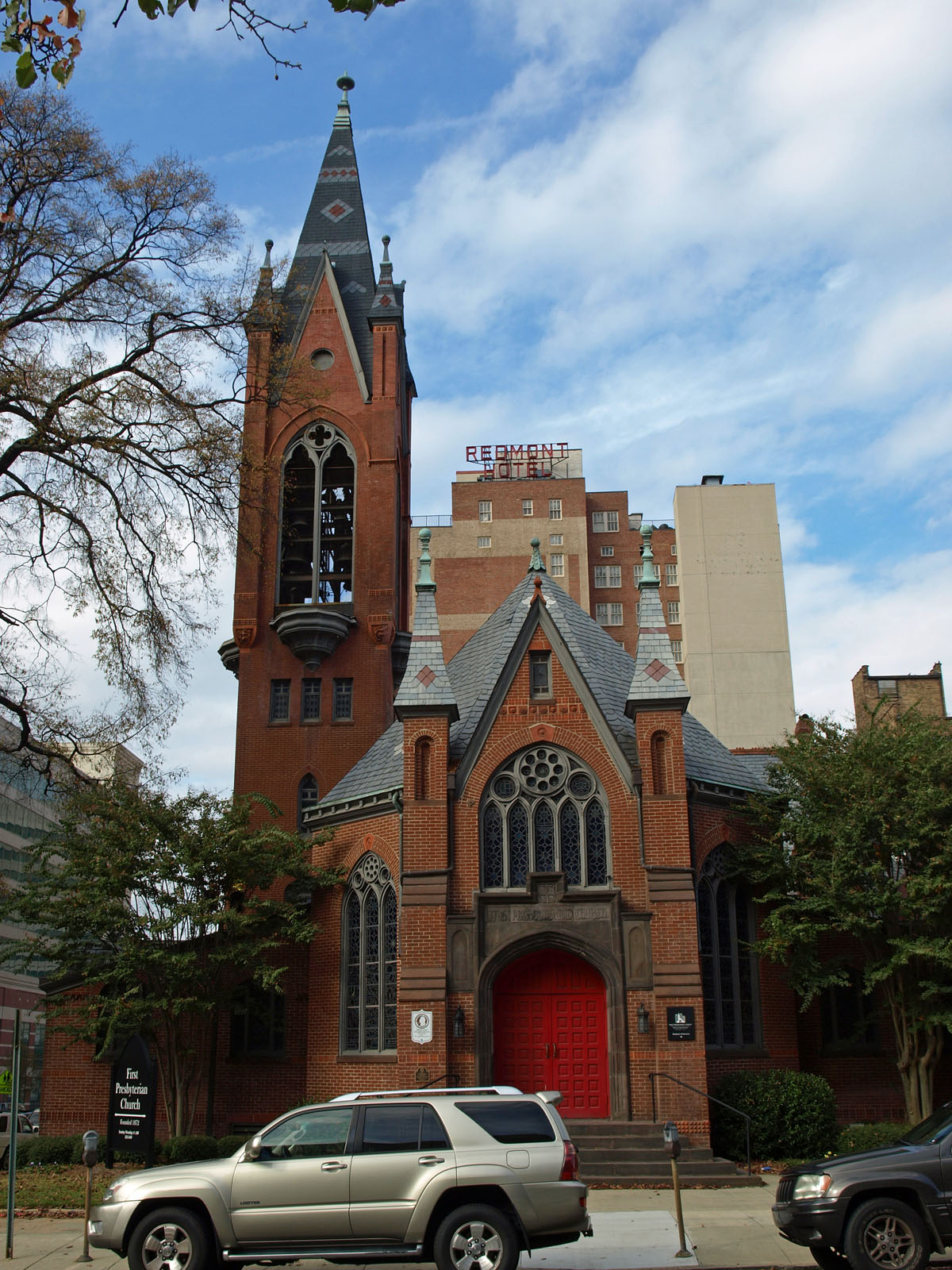

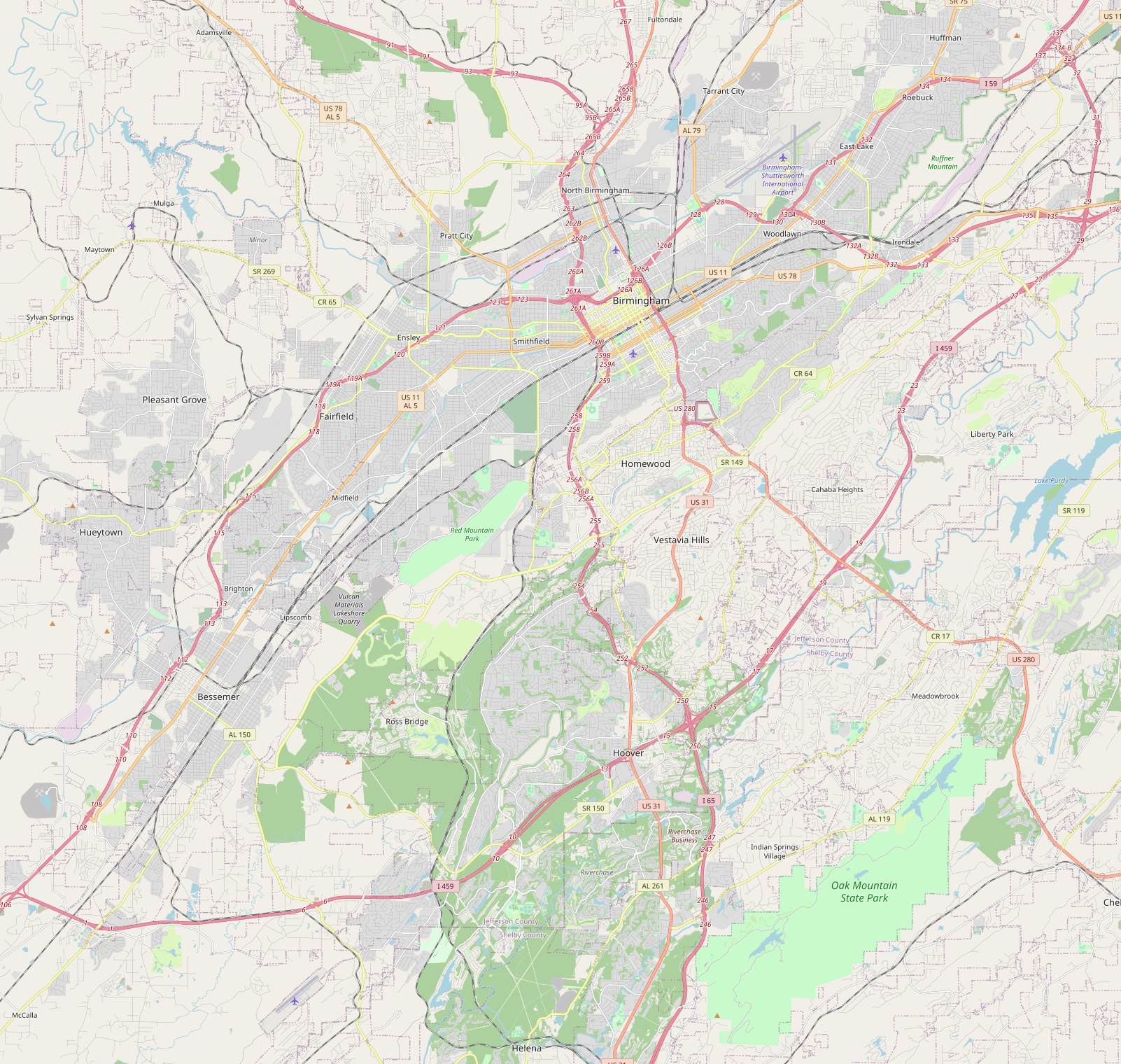
- Location within Birmingham, Alabama Location within Alabama Location within the United States
- Location: 2100 4th Ave., N, Birmingham, Alabama
- Coordinates: 33°31′6″N 86°48′22″W
- Area: 0.7 acres (0.28 ha)
- Built: 1888
- Architectural style: Gothic
- NRHP reference No.: 82001604
- Added to NRHP: December 28, 1982

First Presbyterian Church is an historic church at 2100 4th Avenue, North in Birmingham, Alabama. It was built in 1888 and added to the National Register of Historic Places in 1982. It is a member of the Presbytery of Sheppards & Lapsley.
