= Presbytery of Sheppards and Lapsley =

Presbyterian Church administrative district

The Presbytery of Sheppards and Lapsley is an administrative district of the Presbyterian Church (USA) which comprises some 64 churches (2022) in central Alabama. The Presbytery of Sheppards and Lapsley is one of three presbyteries located in Alabama, and one of twelve comprising the "Synod of Living Waters" in Alabama, Mississippi, Tennessee and Kentucky. The Presbytery of Sheppards and Lapsley was established on January 11, 1988, at the First Presbyterian Church of Selma as a merger of several presbyteries from the former Presbyterian Church in the United States and United Presbyterian Church in the United States of America, the national bodies of which merged in 1983 to form the present PC (USA). PSL's headquarters are located at 3603 Lorna Ridge Drive in Hoover.

The Presbytery operates two retreat centers, the Gulftreat camp in Panama City Beach, Florida and Living River, a retreat on the Cahaba River south of Birmingham.

== Origin ==
The Presbytery of Sheppards and Lapsley is named for William Henry Sheppard and his wife, Lucy Gantt Sheppard, and for Samuel Lapsley, Alabama Presbyterians who established a mission in the Congo Valley in 1890. In 2003 the Presbytery invited the Reverend Dr. Mulumba Mukundi, General Secretary of the Presbyterian Church in the Congo and President of the Presbyterian University of Sheppard and Lapsley there, to visit Birmingham. From that visit, a partnership was forged. In 2004 a delegation of eight people traveled to the DRC to work out a partnership agreement among PSL, the Nganga Presbytery, and the Tshibashi Presbytery. The agreement committed all three groups to participate in a mutual relationship, work together in prayer, evangelism, education and development, and to stay in contact through frequent visits. This unique partnership was highlighted at the 217th PC(USA) General Assembly which PSL hosted at the Birmingham–Jefferson Convention Complex. Communionware created for the event was modeled after a Congolese wooden chalice given to the Presbytery; all attendees were each given a tote bag made in the Congo from traditional cloth, and a joint choir from the three presbyteries performed during worship services in Birmingham.

== Member congregations (90 out of 64) ==
- Arlington Presbyterian Church
- Auburn Korean Presbyterian Church
- Bethel Presbyterian Church, Northport
- Bold Springs Presbyterian Church, Birmingham
- Brown Memorial Presbyterian Church, Tuscaloosa
- Bryan Memorial Presbyterian Church, Birmingham
- Butler Presbyterian Church
- Cahaba Springs Presbyterian Church, Trussville
- Calvary Presbyterian Church, Montgomery
- Carmel Presbyterian Church, Piedmont
- Center Point Presbyterian Church
- Chapel in the Pines, Hoover
- Church of the Covenant, Anniston
- Covenant Presbyterian Church, Tuscaloosa
- Cuba Presbyterian Church
- Dodson Memorial Presbyterian Church, Oxford
- Edgewood Presbyterian Church, Homewood
- Fairfield Highlands Presbyterian Church
- First Presbyterian Church, Alexander City
- First Presbyterian Church, Anniston
- First Presbyterian Church, Auburn
- First Presbyterian Church, Bessemer
- First Presbyterian Church (Birmingham, Alabama)
- First Presbyterian Church, Carbon Hill
- First Presbyterian Church, Dadeville
- First Presbyterian Church, Eufala
- First Presbyterian Church, Jacksonville
- First Presbyterian Church, Livingston
- First Presbyterian Church, Opelika
- First Presbyterian Church, Phenix City
- First Presbyterian Church, Piedmont
- First Presbyterian Church, Reform
- First Presbyterian Church, Selma
- First Presbyterian Church, Sylacauga
- First Presbyterian Church, Talladega
- First Presbyterian Church, Tallassee
- First Presbyterian Church, Tuscaloosa
- First Presbyterian Church, Tuskegee
- First Presbyterian Church, Wetumpka
- First United Presbyterian Church, Anniston
- First United Presbyterian Church, Birmingham
- Five Mile Presbyterian Church, Birmingham
- Gardendale Presbyterian Church
- Good Hope Presbyterian Church, Bessemer
- Good Shepherd Presbyterian Church, Anniston
- Goodwater Presbyterian Church
- Grace Covenant Presbyterian Church, Birmingham
- Green Pond Presbyterian Church
- Hadden Presbyterian Church, Livingston
- Harper Chapel Presbyterian Church, Selma
- Immanuel Presbyterian Church, Montgomery
- Independent Presbyterian Church, Birmingham
- Korean New Church Development, Anniston
- Korean Presbyterian Church, Montgomery
- Korean Presbyterian Church, Pelham
- Korean Presbyterian Church, Tuscaloosa
- Lebanon Presbyterian Church, Lafayette
- Leeds Presbyterian Church
- Leyden Hill Chapel New Church Development, Blue Mountain
- Marion Junction Presbyterian Church
- Memorial Presbyterian Church, Montgomery
- Montevallo Presbyterian Church
- Mount Pleasant Presbyterian Church, Plantersville
- Mountain Brook Presbyterian Church
- New Trinity Presbyterian Church, Camden
- Northern Heights Presbyterian Church, Selma
- Oakmont Presbyterian Church, Hoover
- Odenville Presbyterian Church
- Pisgah Presbyterian Church, Selma
- Ramsay Memorial Presbyterian Church, Tuskegee
- Riverchase Presbyterian Church, Hoover
- Riverview Presbyterian Church, Selma
- Robinson Memorial Presbyterian Church, Alexander City
- Rock Springs Presbyterian Church, Magnolia (Marengo County)
- Saint James Presbyterian Church, Moundville
- Second Presbyterian Church, Birmingham
- Shades Valley Presbyterian Church, Mountain Brook
- South Highland Presbyterian Church, Birmingham
- Southminster Presbyterian Church, Vestavia Hills
- Springville Presbyterian Church
- Trinity Presbyterian Church, Birmingham
- Union Springs Presbyterian Church, Union Springs
- University Presbyterian Church, Tuscaloosa
- Valley Creek Presbyterian Church, Selma
- Westminster Presbyterian Church, Birmingham
- Westminster Presbyterian Church, Montgomery
- Westminster Presbyterian Church, Tuskegee
- Williams Memorial Presbyterian Church, Troy
- Woods Presbyterian Church, Dadeville
- Wylam Presbyterian Church

== Former churches ==
- Avondale Presbyterian Church, Birmingham (1889–2009)
- East Lake Presbyterian Church, East Lake (merged into Grace Presbyterian Church in 1999)
- Eastminster Presbyterian Church, Trussville (merged into Cahaba Springs Presbyterian Church in 2013)
- Grace Presbyterian Church, Trussville (merged into Cahaba Springs Presbyterian Church in 2013)
- Huffman Presbyterian Church, Huffman (merged into Grace Presbyterian Church in 1999)
- Mount Pinson Presbyterian Church (merged into Grace Presbyterian Church in 1999)
- Unity Presbyterian Church, Weogufka (become affiliated with the Presbyterian Church in America in 2014)
- Southwood Presbyterian Church, Talladega (become affiliated with the Presbyterian Church in America in 2014; now defunct)
