= Jack Dahm =

American baseball coach

Current position
- Title: Head coach
- Team: Mount Mercy
- Conference: HAAC
- Record: 126–116–1

Biographical details
- Born: January 19, 1967 (age 59); Skokie, Illinois, U.S.

Playing career
- 1986–1989: Creighton
- Position: Infield

Coaching career (HC unless noted)
- 1990–1993: Creighton (asst.)
- 1994–2003: Creighton
- 2004–2013: Iowa
- 2014–present: Mount Mercy
- 2021–2025: Clinton LumberKings

Head coaching record
- Overall: 625–668–2

Jack Dahm (born January 19, 1967) is an American baseball coach and former infielder, who is the current head baseball coach of the Mount Mercy Mustangs. He previously served as head coach at Creighton and Iowa for ten seasons each. He also previously managed the Clinton LumberKings of the Prospect League during the summer time.

== Playing career ==
Dahm played four seasons as an infielder for Creighton from 1986 through 1989. He graduated in 1990.

== Coaching career ==
After ending his playing career, Dahm became an assistant with Creighton, helping the Bluejays to the 1991 College World Series. He ascended to the head coaching position in 1994 and became the program's all-time winningest coach on May 17, 2003. He earned Missouri Valley Conference Coach of the Year honors twice, in 1999 and 1992, and led the Bluejays to two NCAA Division I Baseball Championship appearances in 1999 and 2000. He saw 17 players drafted and produced two All-Americans.

He became head coach at Iowa in 2004, where he posted just two winning seasons in ten seasons. After Iowa elected not to renew his contract in 2014, he was hired at NAIA Mount Mercy.

In 2026, Dahm was named field manager of the Falmouth Commodores, a collegiate summer baseball team in the Cape Cod Baseball League.
