= Nick Allgeyer =

American baseball player (born 1996)

- Pitcher
- Born: February 3, 1996 (age 29); St. Louis, Missouri, U.S.
- Batted: Left Threw: Left

MLB debut
- July 2, 2021, for the Toronto Blue Jays

Last MLB appearance
- July 2, 2021, for the Toronto Blue Jays

MLB statistics
- Win–loss record: 0–0
- Earned run average: 0.00
- Strikeouts: 0
- Stats at Baseball Reference

Teams
- Toronto Blue Jays (2021)
Medals
Men's baseball
Representing United States
Summer Universiade
| Silver medal – second place | 2017 Taipei | Team |

Nicholas Joseph Allgeyer (born February 3, 1996) is an American former professional baseball pitcher. He played in one game in Major League Baseball (MLB) for the Toronto Blue Jays.

== Career ==
=== Amateur career ===
Allgeyer attended St. John Vianney High School in Missouri where he played baseball and ice hockey. In 2014, he was named the Metro Catholic co-player of the year. As a hockey player, he led his team in goals as a senior.

Allgeyer played college baseball for the Iowa Hawkeyes. On October 11, 2016, he underwent Tommy John surgery and missed the 2017 season. Iowa's baseball team was chosen to represent the United States at the 2017 Summer Universiade in Taipei. Allgeyer pitched in relief for Iowa en route to a silver medal.

=== Toronto Blue Jays ===
Allgeyer was drafted out of Iowa by the Toronto Blue Jays in the 12th round of the 2018 Major League Baseball draft, receiving a signing bonus of $125,000. He was assigned to the Low-A Vancouver Canadians, where he spent the remainder of the season and posted a 2.73 earned run average (ERA) in 15 games. In 2019, Allgeyer played for the High-A Dunedin Blue Jays, pitching to a 3.95 ERA over 23 games and totaling 118 1/3 innings. He was named a Florida State League mid-season all-star as well as a MiLB.com organization all star for the 2019 campaign. Allgeyer did not play in a game in 2020 due to the cancellation of the minor league season because of the COVID-19 pandemic.

On May 15, 2021, Allgeyer was selected to the 40-man roster and promoted to the major leagues for the first time. He was optioned down to Triple-A on May 17 without making an appearance. On July 2, Allgeyer was recalled to the active roster and made his major league debut with a perfect ninth inning against the Tampa Bay Rays. Allgeyer was designated for assignment by Toronto on July 18. Allgeyer was sent outright to the Triple-A Buffalo Bisons on July 27. He finished the year with a 5.34 ERA and 5–5 record across 22 appearances for Buffalo.

Allgeyer spent the entire 2022 season with Buffalo, pitching in 35 games (and starting 15) and posting a 6–6 record and 5.44 ERA with 95 strikeouts in 101.0 innings pitched.

=== Philadelphia Phillies ===
On March 25, 2023, Allgeyer was traded to the Philadelphia Phillies and assigned to the Triple-A Lehigh Valley IronPigs. He made 4 starts for Lehigh Valley, recording a 4.50 ERA with 15 strikeouts in 12.0 innings pitched.

=== Houston Astros ===
On May 5, 2023, Allgeyer was traded to the Houston Astros in exchange for cash considerations. In 19 games for the Triple–A Sugar Land Space Cowboys, he worked to a 5–4 record and 6.62 ERA with 70 strikeouts in 69 1/3 innings pitched. On August 28, Allgeyer was released by the Astros organization.
