= Anthony Castro (baseball) =

Venezuelan baseball player (born 1995)

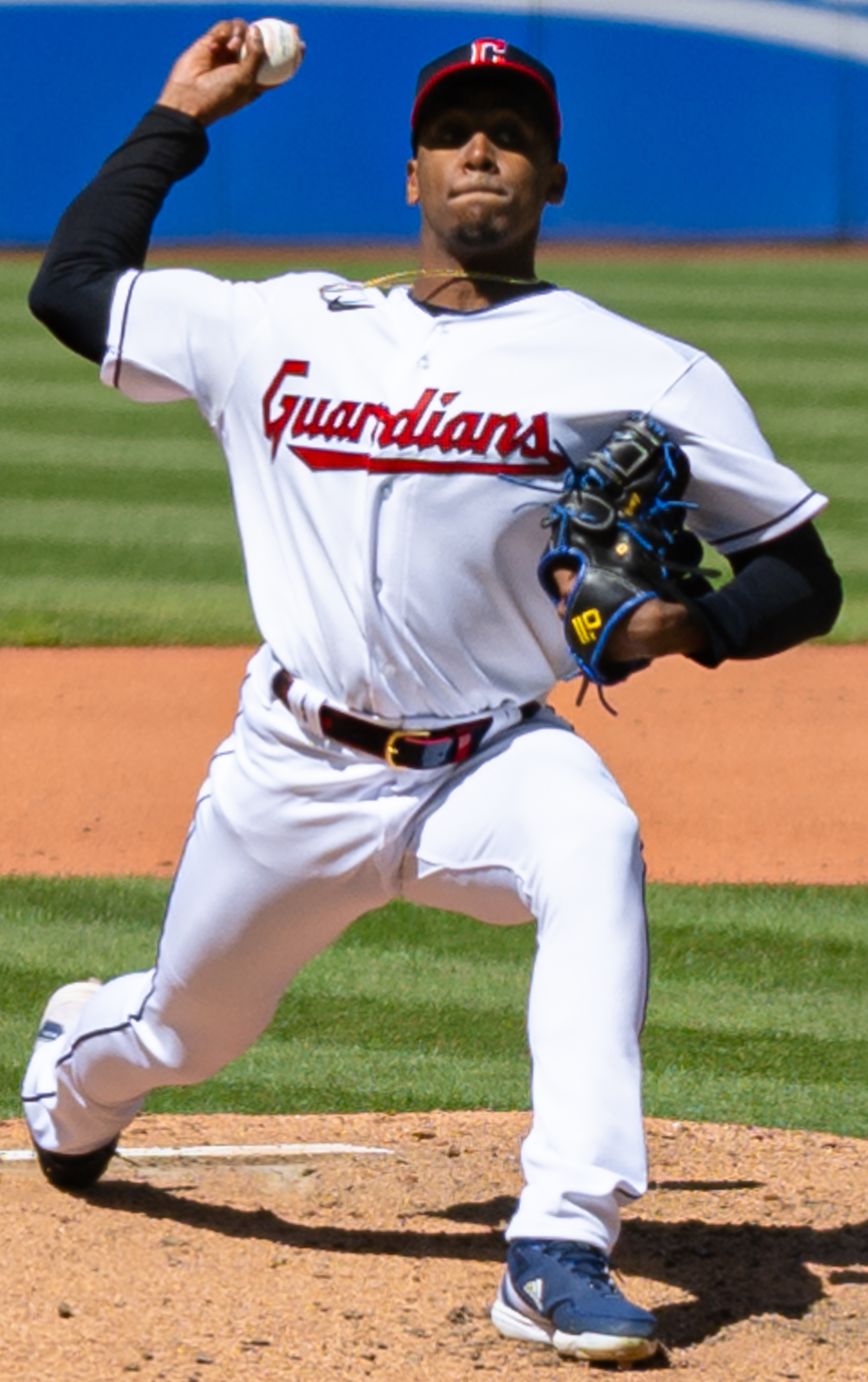
- Castro with the Cleveland Guardians in 2022
- Pitcher
- Born: April 13, 1995 (age 31); Caracas, Venezuela
- Batted: Right Threw: Right

MLB debut
- July 27, 2020, for the Detroit Tigers

Last MLB appearance
- July 24, 2022, for the Cleveland Guardians

MLB statistics
- Win–loss record: 1–2
- Earned run average: 6.00
- Strikeouts: 45
- Stats at Baseball Reference

Teams
- Detroit Tigers (2020); Toronto Blue Jays (2021); Cleveland Guardians (2022)

Anthony Silfredo Castro (born April 13, 1995) is a Venezuelan former professional baseball pitcher. He has previously played in Major League Baseball (MLB) for the Detroit Tigers, Toronto Blue Jays, and Cleveland Guardians.

== Career ==
=== Detroit Tigers ===
Castro signed with the Detroit Tigers as an international free agent in July 2011 and would spend all of 2012 and 2013 with the VSL Tigers. In 2014, he played for the GCL Tigers and would go on to post a 6–3 record and 4.10 ERA over thirteen games, with twelve starts. He would, however, miss all of 2015 as a result of Tommy John surgery and against spent 2016 with the GCL Tigers, finally making his full-season Tigers organization debut in 2017 with the West Michigan Whitecaps. That season he posted a 10–6 record with a 2.49 ERA as a starter, only allowing opponents to hit .226 off of him.

He impressed in 2018 with the Lakeland Flying Tigers with a 9–4 record, 2.93 ERA, and a career-high 101 strikeouts. He earned a brief two-week call-up that season to the AA Erie SeaWolves where he started three games and returned to Lakeland having posted an 8.10 ERA, but only allowing a .229 average off of him. In 2019, Castro would spend the season with Erie and start pitching out of the bullpen. After four appearances, however, he would return to a role as a starter. He gained notoriety within the Tigers' organization as he held opponent to a career-low .207 average against and would earn a spot in the top-twenty Tigers prospects for the mid-season update of the MLB.com organizational listing. Castro was re-signed after becoming a minor league free agent on November 7, 2019.

Castro was added to the Tigers 40–man roster following the 2019 season. Castro made his major league debut on July 27, 2020, but gave up a two-run homer in one inning of work.

=== Toronto Blue Jays ===
On December 7, 2020, Castro was claimed off waivers by the Toronto Blue Jays. On January 21, 2021, Castro was designated for assignment by the Blue Jays following the signing of Tyler Chatwood. Castro was outrighted on January 27. On April 14, 2021, Castro was selected to the active roster.

=== Cleveland Guardians ===
On April 7, 2022, the Blue Jays traded Castro to the Cleveland Guardians in exchange for Bradley Zimmer. Castro was designated for assignment on September 1, 2022.

=== Baltimore Orioles ===
On September 3, 2022, Castro was claimed off waivers by the Baltimore Orioles. He made 8 appearances for the Triple-A Norfolk Tides down the stretch, registering a 2.16 ERA with 8 strikeouts in 8 1/3 innings pitched. He did not appear in a game for Baltimore, and was designated for assignment on October 6, after Anthony Bemboom was added to the roster. He cleared waivers and was sent outright to Norfolk on October 10, but rejected the assignment in favor of free agency on October 13.

=== Washington Nationals ===
On December 14, 2022, Castro signed a minor league deal with the Washington Nationals. He appeared in only two games for the Triple–A Rochester Red Wings, allowing five runs on three hits and three walks in 1/3 of an inning. On July 25, 2023, Castro was released by the Nationals organization.

=== Piratas de Campeche ===
On April 11, 2024, Castro signed with the Piratas de Campeche of the Mexican League. In 14 relief outings for the Piratas, he struggled to an 8.76 ERA with 20 strikeouts and 3 saves across 12 1/3 innings pitched. Castro was released by Campeche on May 15.
