= Southern Workman =

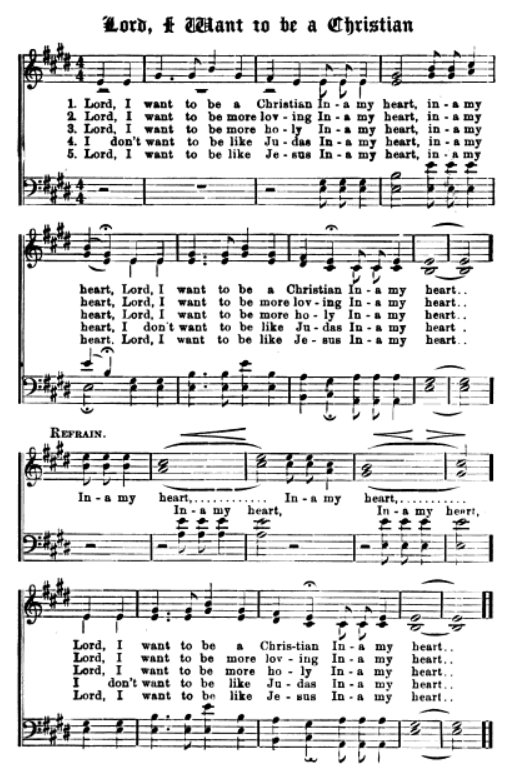
Song published in the Southern Workman

Southern Workman was a monthly magazine published in the United States by the Hampton Institute Press at Hampton Institute. The press was founded in 1871 and the Southern Workman began publication in 1872. For a time it was known as the Southern Workman and Hampton School Record. According to the Dictionary of Virginia the magazine "published news and information about Hampton, its faculty, and its graduates, as well as lectures, articles, book reviews, and essays on topics in African American and American Indian history and education." Many volumes of the Southern Workman are available online. Issues are also in the collections of various libraries.

Contributors included columnist Orra Henderson Moore Gray Langhorne, William Anthony Avery, Natalie Curtis, Anna Evans Murray, Jane E. Davis, Julian Bagley, Charles Holston Williams, and Della Irving Hayden.

In 1900, the magazine was edited by J. E. Davis (Jane E. Davis), who shifted into the role full-time and expanded the size and scope of the publication. Her series of articles on early Eastern Virginia was published in 1907 as Round about Jamestown: Historical Sketches of the Lower Virginia Peninsula. Hampton Institute Press published Samuel Chapman Armstrong's 1913 founder's day address. It also published Then and Now at Hampton Institute, 1868-1902 in 1902.

== See also ==
- Timeline of Hampton, Virginia
