= Jeremy Beasley =

American baseball player (born 1995)

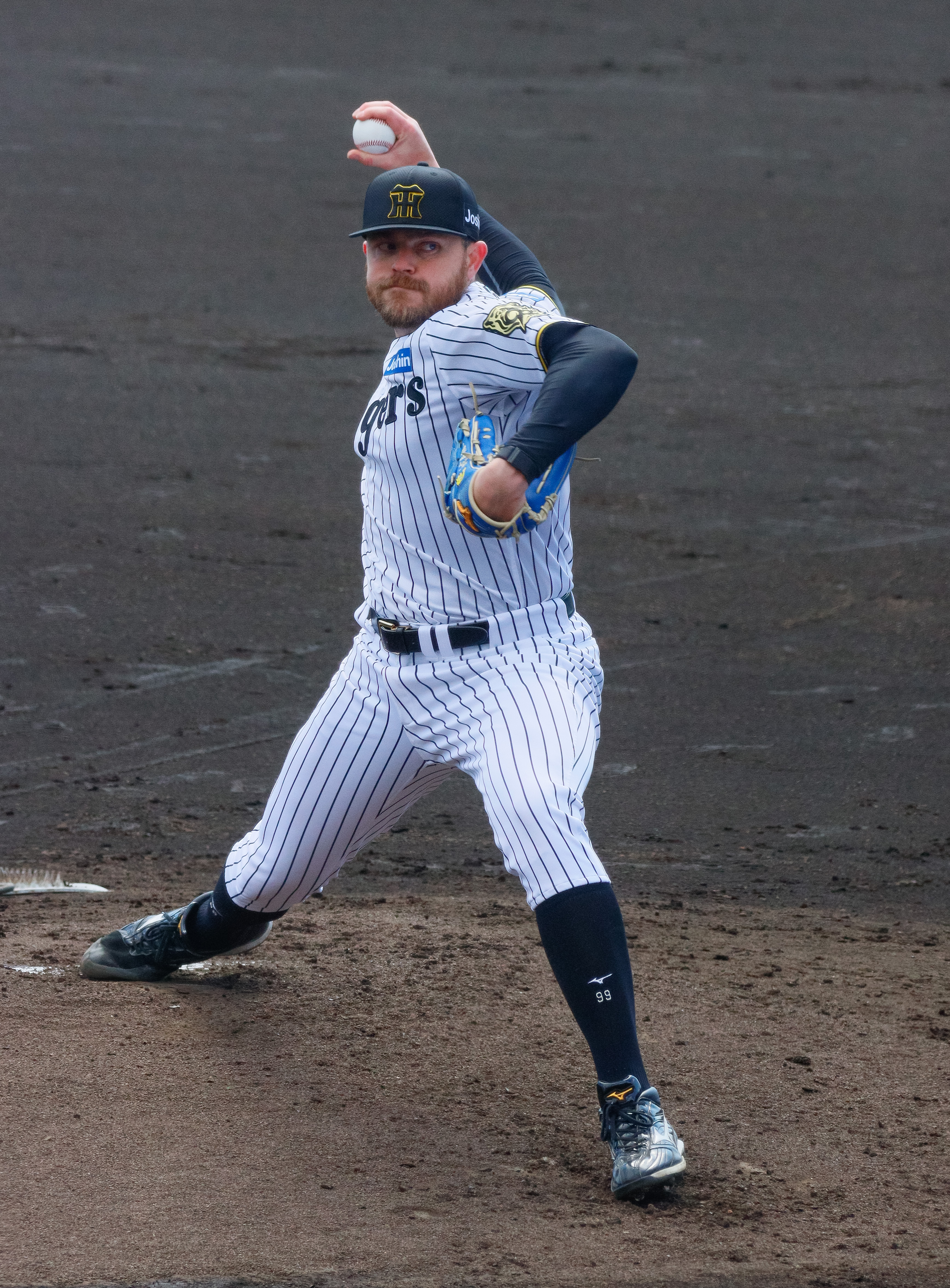
- Beasley with the Hanshin Tigers

Lotte Giants – No. 23
- Pitcher
- Born: November 20, 1995 (age 30); Lyons, Georgia, U.S.
- Bats: Right Throws: Right

Professional debut
- MLB: August 11, 2020, for the Arizona Diamondbacks
- NPB: April 7, 2023, for the Hanshin Tigers
- KBO: March 29, 2026, for the Lotte Giants

MLB statistics (through 2022 season)
- Win–loss record: 0–1
- Earned run average: 5.84
- Strikeouts: 33

NPB statistics (through 2025 season)
- Win–loss record: 10–8
- Earned run average: 2.82
- Strikeouts: 143

KBO statistics (through August 18, 2026)
- Win–loss record: 8-5
- Earned run average: 4.72
- Strikeouts: 121
- Stats at Baseball Reference

Teams
- Arizona Diamondbacks (2020); Toronto Blue Jays (2021–2022); Hanshin Tigers (2023–2025); Lotte Giants (2026–present)

Career highlights and awards
- NPB: Japan Series champion (2023)

Jeremy Lonnie Beasley (born November 20, 1995) is an American professional baseball pitcher for the Lotte Giants of the KBO League. He has previously played in Major League Baseball (MLB) for the Arizona Diamondbacks and Toronto Blue Jays, and in Nippon Professional Baseball (NPB) for the Hanshin Tigers.

== Career ==
=== Los Angeles Angels ===
Beasley was drafted in the 30th round of the 2017 Major League Baseball draft, 895th overall by the Los Angeles Angels from Clemson University. He signed with the team on June 23 and was assigned to the rookie-level Arizona League Angels, and also played for the rookie-level Orem Owlz, posting a cumulative 3.13 ERA in 17 games. In 2018, Beasley split the year between the Double-A Mobile BayBears, the High-A Inland Empire 66ers, and the Single-A Burlington Bees, pitching to a 6–7 record and 2.66 ERA in 25 appearances between the three teams. For the 2019 season, Beasley was assigned to Mobile to begin the year, and received a late season promotion to the Triple-A Salt Lake Bees. On the season, Beasley posted a 7–7 record and 4.49 ERA with 115 strikeouts in 122 1/3 innings of work between the two levels.

=== Arizona Diamondbacks ===
On January 14, 2020, Beasley was traded to the Arizona Diamondbacks in exchange for Matt Andriese. Beasley was called up to the majors for the first time on August 10, 2020. He made his major league debut on August 11 against the Colorado Rockies, pitching a third of an inning and allowing two hits while notching his first career strikeout against Trevor Story. His debut proved to be his only appearance in 2020 as he was placed on the injured list on August 16 with a right shoulder strain and missed the remainder of the season.

On April 17, 2021, Beasley was designated for assignment by the Diamondbacks following the acquisition of Nick Heath.

=== Toronto Blue Jays ===
On April 22, 2021, Beasley was traded to the Toronto Blue Jays for cash considerations. He was assigned to the Triple-A Buffalo Bisons and was later recalled to Toronto's active roster. After struggling to a 7.71 ERA in 8 appearances with Toronto, Beasley was designated for assignment on June 30. He was outrighted to Buffalo on July 4. Beasley had his contract selected from the minors on June 2, 2022.

=== Pittsburgh Pirates ===
On August 2, 2022, Beasley was traded to the Pittsburgh Pirates in exchange for cash considerations. He was designated for assignment on November 15 and released the next day.

=== Hanshin Tigers ===
On December 13, 2022, Beasley signed with the Hanshin Tigers of Nippon Professional Baseball. In 18 games for the Tigers in 2023, he recorded a 2.20 ERA with 43 strikeouts in 41 innings pitched.

On November 30, 2023, Beasley re-signed with Hanshin on a one-year contract. He pitched in 18 games for the team in 2024, compiling an 8-3 record and 2.47 ERA with 75 strikeouts across 76 2/3 innings pitched.

Beasley made eight appearances for the Tigers in 2025, posting a 1-3 record and 4.60 ERA with 25 strikeouts over 29 1/3 innings pitched. He became a free agent following the season.

=== Lotte Giants ===
On December 10, 2025, Beasley signed a one-year, $1 million contract with the Lotte Giants of the KBO League.
