= Jennie Eliza Davis =

Jennie Eliza Davis, known professionally as Jane E. Davis (June 11, 1857 – October 31, 1935) was an American educator, writer, and editor. She taught at Hampton Institute in Hampton, Virginia. She edited the Southern Workman and became head of Hampton Institute Press.

She was born and raised in Troy, New York. Fisher Davis and Charles Davis were her parents. She graduated from Vassar College in 1878.

== Publications ==
- Round about Jamestown: Historical Sketches of the Lower Virginia Peninsula (1907)
- Jamestown and Her Neighbors on Virginia's Historic Peninsula (1928)
