= Cameron Hill (disambiguation) =

Cameron Hill may refer to:

- Cam Hill (born 1994), American professional baseball pitcher
- Cameron Hill (born 1996), Australian racing driver
- Cameron Hill (footballer) (born 2000), English footballer, see List of Bury F.C. players (1–24 appearances)
