= 2020 Cleveland Indians season =

2020 Cleveland Indians
- American League Central 2nd Place
- League: American League
- Division: Central
- Ballpark: Progressive Field
- City: Cleveland, Ohio
- Record: 35–25 (58.3%)
- Divisional place: 2nd
- Owners: Larry Dolan
- President of baseball operations: Chris Antonetti
- General managers: Mike Chernoff
- Managers: Terry Francona
- Television: SportsTime Ohio · WKYC (Matt Underwood, Rick Manning)
- Radio: WTAM · WMMS; Cleveland Indians Radio Network (Tom Hamilton, Jim Rosenhaus, Rick Manning)

The 2020 Cleveland Indians season was the 120th season for the franchise. It was the eighth season under the leadership of manager Terry Francona and fifth under general manager Mike Chernoff. The Indians play their home games at Progressive Field in Cleveland, Ohio. They made the playoffs after missing them in 2019 and improved upon their previous year's record of 93–69. They were swept out of the playoffs, losing both games of the ALWCS to the New York Yankees, extending their postseason losing streak to eight games.

On March 12, 2020, MLB announced that because of the ongoing COVID-19 pandemic, the start of the regular season would be delayed by at least two weeks in addition to the remainder of spring training being cancelled. Four days later, it was announced that the start of the season would be pushed back indefinitely due to the recommendation made by the CDC to restrict events of more than 50 people for eight weeks. On June 23, commissioner Rob Manfred unilaterally implemented a 60-game season. Players reported to training camps on July 1 in order to participate in "summer camp" and prepare for a July 24 Opening Day.

== Season standings ==
=== American League Central ===
AL Central
Team	W	L	Pct.	GB	Home	Road
Minnesota Twins	36	24	.600	—	24‍–‍7	12‍–‍17
Cleveland Indians	35	25	.583	1	18‍–‍12	17‍–‍13
Chicago White Sox	35	25	.583	1	18‍–‍12	17‍–‍13
Kansas City Royals	26	34	.433	10	15‍–‍15	11‍–‍19
Detroit Tigers	23	35	.397	12	12‍–‍15	11‍–‍20

=== American League Wild Card ===
Division leaders
Team	W	L	Pct.
Tampa Bay Rays	40	20	.667
Oakland Athletics	36	24	.600
Minnesota Twins	36	24	.600

Division 2nd place
Team	W	L	Pct.
Cleveland Indians	35	25	.583
New York Yankees	33	27	.550
Houston Astros	29	31	.483

Wild Card teams (Top 2 teams qualify for postseason)
Team	W	L	Pct.	GB
Chicago White Sox	35	25	.583	+3
Toronto Blue Jays	32	28	.533	—
Seattle Mariners	27	33	.450	5
Los Angeles Angels	26	34	.433	6
Kansas City Royals	26	34	.433	6
Baltimore Orioles	25	35	.417	7
Boston Red Sox	24	36	.400	8
Detroit Tigers	23	35	.397	8
Texas Rangers	22	38	.367	10

=== Record against opponents ===
2020 American League record Source: MLB Standings Grid – 2020
Team	CWS	CLE	DET	KC	MIN	NL
Chicago	—	2–8	9–1	9–1	5–5	10–10
Cleveland	8–2	—	7–3	5–5	3–7	12–8
Detroit	1–9	3–7	—	4–6	4–6	11–7
Kansas City	1–9	5–5	6–4	—	5–5	9–11
Minnesota	5–5	7–3	6–4	5–5	—	13–7

== Game log ==
=== Regular season ===
2020 Game Log: 35–25 (Home: 18–12; Away: 17–13)
July: 5–3 (Home: 4–2; Away: 1–1)

#	Date	Opponent	Score	Win	Loss	Save	Record	StreakUse background:#fbb for loss, #bfb for win, #bbb for cancelled/postponed -->
1	July 24	Royals	2–0	**Bieber** (1–0)	Duffy (0–1)	**Hand** (1)	1–0	W1
2	July 25	Royals	2–3 (10)	Barlow (1–0)	**Karinchak** (0–1)	Holland (1)	1–1	L1
3	July 26	Royals	9–2	**Carrasco** (1–0)	Bolaños (0–1)	—	2–1	W1
–	July 27	White Sox	Postponed (rain). Makeup date: July 28.					
4	July 28	White Sox	4–3	**Civale** (1–0)	Cease (0–1)	**Hand** (2)	3–1	W2
5	July 28	White Sox	5–3	**Plutko** (1–0)	Rodón (0–1)	**Hill** (1)	4–1	W3
6	July 29	White Sox	0–4	Bummer (1–0)	**Hand** (0–1)	—	4–2	L1
7	July 30	@ Twins	2–0	**Bieber** (2–0)	Berríos (0–1)	**Karinchak** (1)	5–2	W1
8	July 31	@ Twins	1–4	Dobnak (1–1)	**Clevinger** (0–1)	Rogers (2)	5–3	L1

August: 16–11 (Home: 5–5; Away: 11–6)

#	Date	Opponent	Score	Win	Loss	Save	Record	StreakUse background:#fbb for loss, #bfb for win, #bbb for cancelled/postponed -->
9	August 1	@ Twins	0–3	Maeda (2–0)	**Carrasco** (1–1)	Rogers (3)	5–4	L2
10	August 2	@ Twins	1–3	Smeltzer (1–0)	**Civale** (1–1)	Romo (2)	5–5	L3
11	August 3	@ Reds	2–3	Gray (3–0)	**Plesac** (0–1)	Iglesias (1)	5–6	L4
12	August 4	@ Reds	4–2	**Bieber** (3–0)	Jones (0–1)	**Hand** (3)	6–6	W1
13	August 5	Reds	2–0	**Clevinger** (1–1)	Antone (0–1)	**Hand** (4)	7–6	W2
14	August 6	Reds	13–0	**Carrasco** (2–1)	Castillo (0–2)	—	8–6	W3
15	August 7	@ White Sox	0–2	Cease (2–1)	**Civale** (1–2)	Colomé (4)	8–7	L1
16	August 8	@ White Sox	7–1	**Plesac** (1–1)	Anderson (0–1)	—	9–7	W1
17	August 9	@ White Sox	5–4 (10)	**Maton** (1–0)	Cordero (0–1)	**Pérez** (1)	10–7	W2
18	August 11	Cubs	1–7	Lester (2–0)	**Plutko** (0–1)	—	10–8	L1
19	August 12	Cubs	2–7	Hendricks (3–1)	**Carrasco** (2–2)	—	10–9	L2
20	August 14	@ Tigers	10–5	**Civale** (2–2)	Nova (1–1)	—	11–9	W1
21	August 15	@ Tigers	3–1	**Bieber** (4–0)	Turnbull (2–1)	**Hand** (5)	12–9	W2
22	August 16	@ Tigers	8–5	**Pérez** (1–0)	Schreiber (0–1)	—	13–9	W3
23	August 18	@ Pirates	6–3 (10)	**Wittgren** (1–0)	Howard (1–1)	**Hand** (6)	14–9	W4
24	August 19	@ Pirates	6–1	**Civale** (3–2)	Neverauskas (0–3)	—	15–9	W5
25	August 20	@ Pirates	2–0	**Bieber** (5–0)	Williams (1–4)	**Hand** (7)	16–9	W6
26	August 21	Tigers	5–10	García (1–0)	**Plutko** (1–2)	—	16–10	L1
27	August 22	Tigers	6–1	**McKenzie** (1–0)	Boyd (0–4)	—	17–10	W1
28	August 23	Tigers	4–7	Norris (2–1)	**Carrasco** (2–3)	—	17–11	L1
29	August 24	Twins	2–3	Maeda (4–0)	**Civale** (3–3)	Rogers (7)	17–12	L2
30	August 25	Twins	4–2	**Bieber** (6–0)	Alcalá (1–1)	**Hand** (8)	18–12	W1
31	August 26	Twins	6–3	**Maton** (2–0)	Romo (0–1)	**Hand** (9)	19–12	W2
32	August 28	@ Cardinals	14–2	**Hill** (1–0)	Ponce de Leon (0–3)	**Plutko** (1)	20–12	W3
33	August 29	@ Cardinals	2–1 (12)	**Wittgren** (2–0)	Reyes (1–1)	**Hand** (10)	21–12	W4
34	August 30	@ Cardinals	2–7	Wainwright (3–0)	**Civale** (3–4)	—	21–13	L1
35	August 31	@ Royals	1–2	Barlow (2–1)	**Karinchak** (0–2)	Holland (2)	21–14	L2

September: 14–11 (Home: 9–5; Away: 5–6)

#	Date	Opponent	Score	Win	Loss	Save	Record	StreakUse background:#fbb for loss, #bfb for win, #bbb for cancelled/postponed -->
36	September 1	@ Royals	10–1	**Plesac** (2–1)	Harvey (0–2)	—	22–14	W1
37	September 2	@ Royals	5–0	**McKenzie** (2–0)	Junis (0–1)	—	23–14	W2
38	September 4	Brewers	1–7	Burnes (2–0)	**Maton** (2–1)	—	23–15	L1
39	September 5	Brewers	4–3	**Hand** (1–1)	Hader (0–1)	—	24–15	W1
40	September 6	Brewers	4–1	**Bieber** (7–0)	Anderson (2–3)	**Hand** (11)	25–15	W2
41	September 7	Royals	5–2	**Plesac** (3–1)	Keller (3–2)	**Hand** (12)	26–15	W3
42	September 8	Royals	5–8	Holland (3–0)	**Cimber** (0–1)	Barlow (2)	26–16	L1
43	September 9	Royals	0–3	Duffy (3–3)	**Carrasco** (2–4)	Holland (3)	26–17	L2
44	September 10	Royals	1–11	Singer (2–4)	**Civale** (3–5)	—	26–18	L3
45	September 11	@ Twins	1–3	Maeda (5–1)	**Bieber** (7–1)	Rogers (9)	26–19	L4
46	September 12	@ Twins	4–8	Hill (2–1)	**Plesac** (3–2)	—	26–20	L5
47	September 13	@ Twins	5–7	Thielbar (2–0)	**McKenzie** (2–1)	Romo (4)	26–21	L6
48	September 15	@ Cubs	5–6	Jeffress (4–1)	**Pérez** (1–1)	—	26–22	L7
49	September 16	@ Cubs	2–3 (10)	Adam (2–1)	**Maton** (2–2)	—	26–23	L8
50	September 17	@ Tigers	10–3	**Bieber** (8–1)	Mize (0–2)	—	27–23	W1
51	September 18	@ Tigers	1–0	**Plesac** (4–2)	Alexander (2–2)	**Hand** (13)	28–23	W2
52	September 19	@ Tigers	2–5	Cisnero (3–3)	**Maton** (2–3)	Garcia (3)	28–24	L1
53	September 20	@ Tigers	7–4	**Carrasco** (3–4)	Boyd (2–7)	—	29–24	W1
54	September 21	White Sox	7–4	**Civale** (4–5)	Fry (0–1)	**Hand** (14)	30–24	W2
55	September 22	White Sox	5–3 (10)	**Maton** (3–3)	Foster (5–1)	—	31–24	W3
56	September 23	White Sox	3–2	**Hand** (2–1)	González (1–2)	—	32–24	W4
57	September 24	White Sox	5–4	**Hill** (2–0)	Rodón (0–2)	**Hand** (15)	33–24	W5
58	September 25	Pirates	4–3	**Plutko** (2–2)	Stratton (2–1)	—	34–24	W6
59	September 26	Pirates	0–8	Musgrove (1–5)	**Civale** (4–6)	—	34–25	L1
60	September 27	Pirates	8–6	**Karinchak** (1–2)	Turley (0–3)	**Hand** (16)	35–25	W1

Legend: = Win = Loss = Postponement
Bold = Indians team member

=== Postseason ===
2020 Postseason: 0−2 (Home 0−2; Away 0−0)
American League Wild Card Series: 0−2 (Home 0–2; Away 0–0)

#	Date	Opponent	Score	Win	Loss	Save	Record
1	September 29	Yankees	3–12	Cole (1–0)	**Bieber** (0–1)	—	0–1
2	September 30	Yankees	9–10	Chapman (1–0)	**Hand** (0–1)	—	0–2

== Postseason rosters ==
Playoff rosters
American League Wild Card Series

- Pitchers: 26 Triston McKenzie 27 Cam Hill 33 Brad Hand 34 Zach Plesac 38 Cal Quantrill 39 Óliver Pérez 43 Aaron Civale 57 Shane Bieber 59 Carlos Carrasco 62 Nick Wittgren 88 Phil Maton 90 Adam Cimber 99 James Karinchak
- Catchers: 9 Sandy León 17 Austin Hedges 55 Roberto Pérez
- Infielders: 6 Mike Freeman 7 César Hernández 11 José Ramírez 12 Francisco Lindor 41 Carlos Santana
- Outfielders: 0 Delino DeShields Jr. 4 Bradley Zimmer 8 Jordan Luplow 30 Tyler Naquin 31 Josh Naylor 35 Oscar Mercado
- Designated hitters: 32 Franmil Reyes

== Player stats ==
=== Batting ===
Note: G = Games played; AB = At bats; R = Runs scored; H = Hits; 2B = Doubles; 3B = Triples; HR = Home runs; RBI = Runs batted in; AVG = Batting average; SB = Stolen bases

Player	G	AB	R	H	2B	3B	HR	RBI	AVG	SB
Greg Allen	15	25	3	4	1	0	1	4	.160	1
Christian Arroyo	1	0	0	0	0	0	0	0	—	0
Yu Chang	10	11	1	2	0	0	0	1	.182	0
Delino DeShields Jr.	37	107	10	27	3	2	0	7	.252	3
Mike Freeman	24	38	5	9	3	0	0	3	.237	0
Austin Hedges	6	12	0	1	0	0	0	0	.083	0
Cesar Hernandez	58	233	35	66	20	0	3	20	.283	0
Daniel Johnson	5	12	0	1	0	0	0	0	.083	0
Sandy Leon	25	66	4	9	1	0	2	4	.136	0
Francisco Lindor	60	236	30	61	13	0	8	27	.258	6
Jordan Luplow	29	78	8	15	5	1	2	8	.192	0
Oscar Mercado	36	86	6	11	1	0	1	6	.128	3
Tyler Naquin	40	133	15	29	8	1	4	20	.218	0
Josh Naylor	22	61	9	14	3	0	0	2	.230	0
Roberto Perez	32	97	6	16	2	0	1	5	.165	0
José Ramírez	58	219	45	64	16	1	17	46	.292	10
Franmil Reyes	59	211	27	58	10	0	9	34	.275	0
Carlos Santana	60	206	34	41	7	0	8	30	.199	0
Domingo Santana	24	70	6	11	3	0	2	12	.157	0
Beau Taylor	7	21	1	1	0	0	0	2	.048	0
Bradley Zimmer	20	37	3	6	0	0	1	3	.162	2
Team totals	60	1959	248	446	96	5	59	234	.228	25

=== Pitching ===
Note: W = Wins; L = Losses; ERA = Earned run average; G = Games pitched; GS = Games started; SV = Saves; IP = Innings pitched; H = Hits allowed; R = Runs allowed; ER = Earned runs allowed; BB = Walks allowed; K = Strikeouts

Player	W	L	ERA	G	GS	SV	IP	H	R	ER	BB	K
Logan Allen	0	0	3.08	3	0	0	10.2	12	4	4	7	7
Shane Bieber	8	1	1.63	12	12	0	77.1	46	15	14	21	122
Carlos Carrasco	3	4	2.91	12	12	0	68.0	55	22	22	27	82
Adam Cimber	0	1	3.97	14	0	0	11.1	13	5	5	2	5
Aaron Civale	4	6	4.74	12	12	0	74.0	82	39	39	16	69
Mike Clevinger	1	1	3.18	4	4	0	22.2	20	8	8	11	21
Brad Hand	2	1	2.05	23	0	16	22.0	13	8	5	4	29
Cam Hill	2	0	4.91	18	0	1	18.1	11	11	10	5	16
James Karinchak	1	2	2.67	27	0	1	27.0	14	9	8	16	53
Dominic Leone	0	0	8.38	12	0	0	9.2	14	9	9	5	16
Phil Maton	3	3	4.57	23	0	0	21.2	23	14	11	6	32
Triston McKenzie	2	1	3.24	8	6	0	33.1	21	12	12	9	42
Kyle Nelson	0	0	54.00	1	0	0	0.2	3	4	4	1	0
Oliver Perez	1	1	2.00	21	0	1	18.0	13	5	4	6	14
Zach Plesac	4	2	2.28	8	8	0	55.1	38	14	14	6	57
Adam Plutko	2	2	4.88	10	4	1	27.2	30	15	15	7	15
Cal Quantrill	0	0	1.84	8	2	0	14.2	14	6	3	2	13
Nick Wittgren	2	0	3.42	25	0	0	23.2	18	9	9	6	28
Team totals	35	25	3.29	60	60	20	536.0	440	209	196	157	621

== Roster ==
2020 Cleveland Indians
Roster
Pitchers: 54 Logan Allen; 57 Shane Bieber; 59 Carlos Carrasco; 90 Adam Cimber; 43 Aaron Civale; 52 Mike Clevinger; 33 Brad Hand; 27 Cam Hill; 99 James Karinchak; 53 Dominic Leone; 88 Phil Maton; 26 Triston McKenzie; 63 Kyle Nelson; 39 Óliver Pérez; 34 Zach Plesac; 45 Adam Plutko; 38 Cal Quantrill; 62 Nick Wittgren	Catchers: 17 Austin Hedges; 9 Sandy León; 55 Roberto Pérez; 46 Beau Taylor; Infielders: 26 Christian Arroyo; 2 Yu Chang; 6 Mike Freeman; 7 César Hernández; 12 Francisco Lindor; 11 José Ramírez; 41 Carlos Santana	Outfielders: 1 Greg Allen; 0 Delino DeShields Jr.; 23 Daniel Johnson; 8 Jordan Luplow; 35 Oscar Mercado; 30 Tyler Naquin; 31 Josh Naylor; 32 Franmil Reyes; 24 Domingo Santana; 4 Bradley Zimmer	Manager: 77 Terry Francona; Coaches: 15 Sandy Alomar Jr. (catching coach/acting manager); 87 Mike Barnett (replays/assistant bench coach); 64 Armando Camacaro (bullpen catcher); -- Alex Eckelman (assistant hitting); 97 Kyle Hudson (1B coach); 70 Tony Mansolino (3B coach); 00 Brad Mills (bench/OF); 58 Ruben Niebla (assistant pitching); 82 Ricky Pacione (bullpen catcher); 60 Victor Rodriguez (acting hitting); 16 Mike Sarbaugh (acting bench/OF); 85 Brian Sweeney (bullpen); 96 Justin Toole (hitting analyst); 29 Ty Van Burkleo (hitting); 51 Carl Willis (pitching)

== Farm system ==
Level	Team	League	Manager
AAA	Columbus Clippers	International League	Andy Tracy
AA	Akron RubberDucks	Eastern League	Rouglas Odor
A-Advanced	Lynchburg Hillcats	Carolina League	Jim Pankovits
A	Lake County Captains	Midwest League	Greg DiCenzo
A-Short Season	Mahoning Valley Scrappers	New York–Penn League	Dennis Malave
Rookie	AZL Indians	Arizona League	Larry Day (AZL Indians 1 "Red")/Jerry Owens (AZL Indians 2 "Blue")
Rookie	DSL Indians	Dominican Summer League	Jesús Tavárez (DSL Indians)/Alcides Melendez (DSL Indians/Brewers)
