= Jhon Torres =

American baseball player (born 2000)

Free agent
- Outfielder
- Born: March 29, 2000 (age 25); Sincelejo, Colombia
- Bats: Right Throws: Right

Jhon Hansser Torres (born March 29, 2000) is a Colombian professional baseball outfielder who is a free agent.

== Career ==
=== Cleveland Indians ===
Torres signed with the Cleveland Indians as an international free agent on July 24, 2016. He made his professional debut in 2017 with the Rookie-level Dominican Summer League Indians, batting .255 with five home runs and 35 RBI over 54 games. He began the 2018 season with the rookie-level Arizona League Indians, hitting .273 with four home runs, 16 RBI, and three stolen bases across 27 games.

=== St. Louis Cardinals ===
On July 31, 2018, Torres (alongside Conner Capel) was traded to the St. Louis Cardinals in exchange for Óscar Mercado. He was assigned to the rookie-level Gulf Coast League Cardinals, with whom he finished the season. Over 44 games combined between the two affiliates, Torres slashed .321/.409/.525 with eight home runs and thirty RBI.

In 2019, Torres began the season with the Peoria Chiefs of the Single-A Midwest League. However, after batting only .167 with eight RBI over 21 games, he was reassigned to the Johnson City Cardinals of the rookie-level Appalachian League where he hit .286/.391/.527 with six home runs and 17 RBI over 33 games to end the year. Torres did not play in a game in 2020 due to the cancellation of the minor league season because of the COVID-19 pandemic. For the 2021 season, he returned to Peoria, now members of the High-A Central, and slashed .238/.302/.366 with six home runs, 32 RBI, and 25 doubles over 97 games.

Torres returned to Peoria to begin the 2022 season, but opened the year on the injured list. He ultimately made 32 appearances split between the rookie-level Florida Complex League Cardinals and Single-A Palm Beach Cardinals, batting a combined .229/.288/.358 with three home runs and 17 RBI. Torres was released by the Cardinals organization on September 20, 2022.
