= Brad Hand =

American baseball player (born 1990)

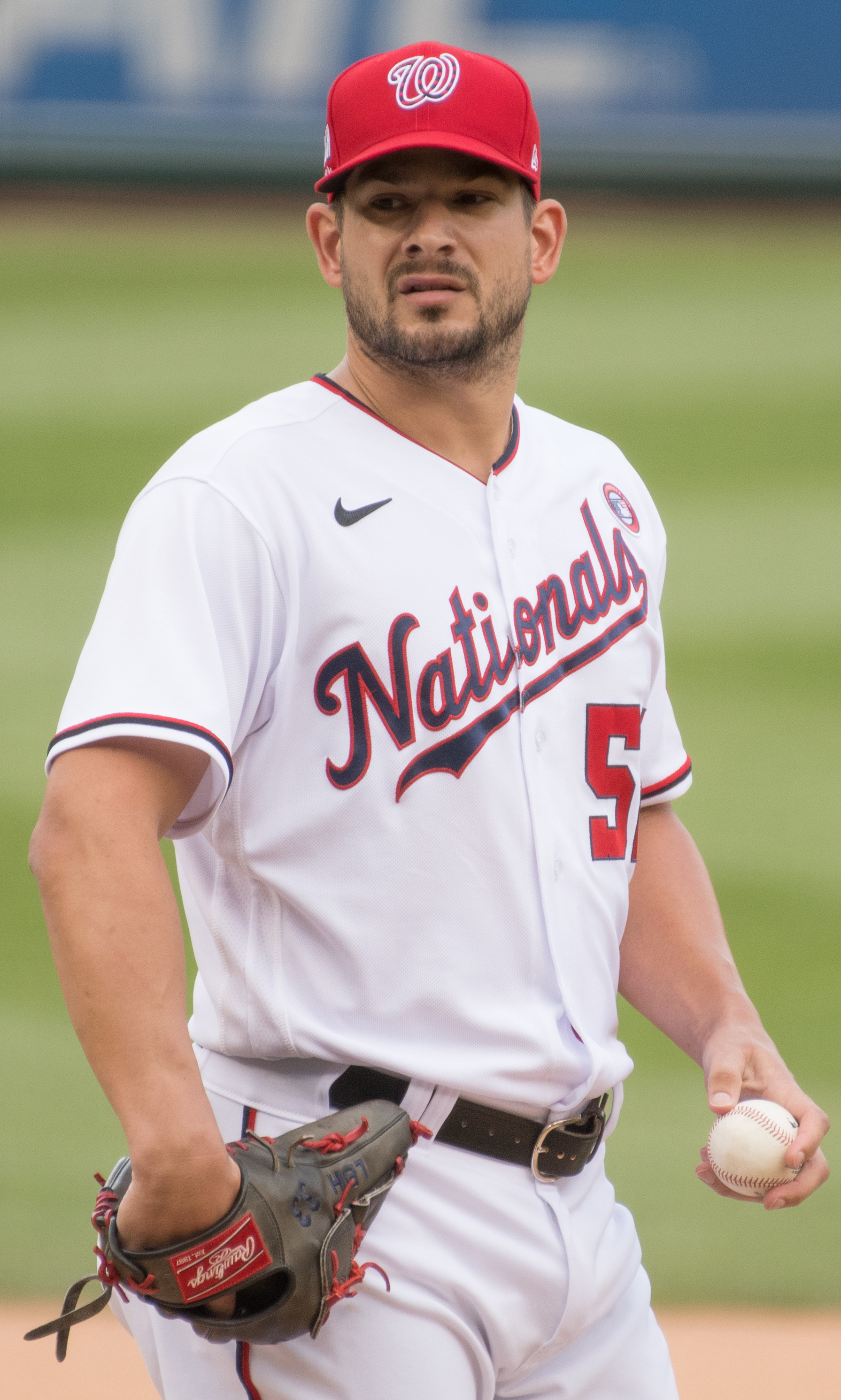
- Hand with the Washington Nationals in 2021
- Pitcher
- Born: March 20, 1990 (age 36); Minneapolis, Minnesota, U.S.
- Batted: Left Threw: Left

MLB debut
- June 7, 2011, for the Florida Marlins

Last MLB appearance
- October 1, 2023, for the Atlanta Braves

MLB statistics
- Win–loss record: 40–55
- Earned run average: 3.75
- Strikeouts: 782
- Saves: 132
- Stats at Baseball Reference

Teams
- Florida / Miami Marlins (2011–2015); San Diego Padres (2016–2018); Cleveland Indians (2018–2020); Washington Nationals (2021); Toronto Blue Jays (2021); New York Mets (2021); Philadelphia Phillies (2022); Colorado Rockies (2023); Atlanta Braves (2023)

Career highlights and awards
- 3× All-Star (2017–2019); AL saves leader (2020)

Bradley Richard Hand (born March 20, 1990) is an American former professional baseball pitcher. Between 2011 and 2023, he played 13 seasons in Major League Baseball (MLB) for the Florida/Miami Marlins, San Diego Padres, Cleveland Indians, Washington Nationals, Toronto Blue Jays, New York Mets, Philadelphia Phillies, Colorado Rockies, and Atlanta Braves.

Born in Minneapolis, Minnesota, Hand's family settled in Chaska before he entered high school. He was a three-sport athlete at Chaska High School, and after his senior year in 2008, the Florida Marlins selected him in the second round of the 2008 MLB draft. Hand chose to forego a college baseball commitment to Arizona State in favor of turning professional. He made his MLB debut in 2011 when Marlins starting pitcher Josh Johnson was injured, but inconsistent pitch command prevented Hand from becoming a fixture in the Marlins' major league roster until 2014, when he was assigned to the bullpen. Hand spent the next two seasons alternating between starting and relief roles for Miami before he was claimed on waivers by the Padres shortly before the 2016 season.

Hand had a breakout role in San Diego, attributed in part to his slider. He was named to three consecutive All-Star Games beginning in 2017, the same year that he became a closer. The Padres traded Hand to the Indians midway through the 2018 season, and he made his first postseason appearance in the 2018 American League Division Series. After struggling with arm fatigue and pitch delivery issues in 2019, Hand was perfect in 16 save opportunities for Cleveland in 2020, but he was designated for assignment at the end of the year. Hand found varying levels of success in 2021 with Washington, Toronto, and New York before signing with Philadelphia in 2022.

== Early life ==
Bradley Richard Hand was born on March 20, 1990, in Minneapolis, Minnesota, to Lon and Barb Hand of Hampton, Iowa. Hand's family moved around Minnesota during his childhood, with stops in West St. Paul and Eagan before settling in Chaska just before Hand entered high school. He was a three-sport varsity athlete at Chaska High School, receiving honors in American football, ice hockey, and baseball. Hand finished his senior baseball season with an 8–2 win–loss record, two saves, and a 0.61 earned run average (ERA), allowing only six earned runs in 68 innings pitched. This included a complete game, three-hit shutout against Eden Prairie High School, a 3–0 victory in which Hand struck out 14 batters. At the plate, Hand batted .352 with eight home runs and 24 runs batted in (RBI).

== Professional career ==
=== Draft and minor leagues (2008–2010) ===
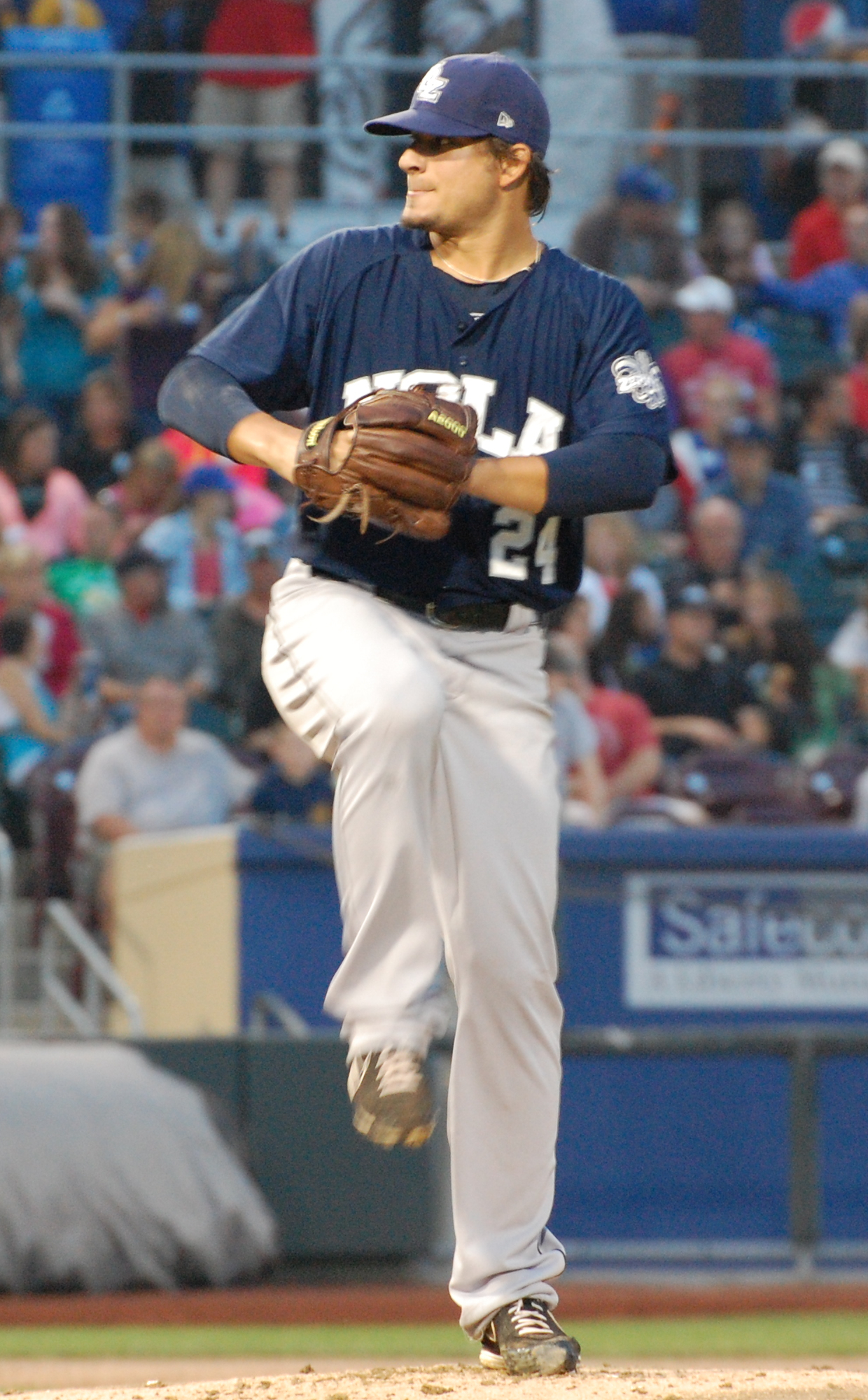
Hand with the New Orleans Zephyrs in 2012

The Florida Marlins of Major League Baseball (MLB) selected Hand out of high school in the second round, 52nd overall, of the 2008 MLB draft. At the time, he had committed to play college baseball for the Arizona State Sun Devils. Hand instead signed with the Marlins that June for a $760,000 signing bonus and was assigned to the Rookie-level Gulf Coast League Marlins to begin his professional baseball career. In nine games there, seven of which were starts, Hand had a 2–0 record and 2.48 ERA, striking out 34 batters in 32 2/3 innings. He was promoted to the Class A Short Season Jamestown Jammers at the end of August. His first win came on September 4, when he allowed two hits in six scoreless innings and the Jammers clinched a berth in the New York–Penn League (NYPL) playoffs. The Jammers reached the NYPL finals but lost the championship to the Batavia Muckdogs. Hand made three starts for Jamestown, in which he went 1–2 with a 3.00 ERA and struck out 12 batters in 15 innings.

In 2009, Hand was promoted to the Greensboro Grasshoppers of the Low-A South Atlantic League, where he went 7–13 with a 4.86 ERA in 26 starts. His 13 losses set a franchise record in Greensboro, but he also led the team that season with 122 strikeouts in 127 2/3 innings. He improved as the season went on in Greensboro: Hand was 2–5 with a 7.68 ERA in his first eight starts, but had only a 3.84 ERA in his next 19 appearances. He was promoted to the Class A-Advanced Jupiter Hammerheads to begin the 2010 season, and by mid-June, he led the team with a 4–3 record, 3.33 ERA, and 74 strikeouts in 75 2/3 innings. Hand was named the Florida State League Pitcher of the Week for the week ending June 13 after pitching a complete game shutout against the Tampa Yankees. He went 8–8 with a 3.33 ERA in 26 starts for Jupiter before receiving a promotion to the Double-A Jacksonville Suns at the beginning of September. In his only appearance for Jacksonville that season, Hand held the Tennessee Smokies to four hits in six innings of a 6–2 Jacksonville win.

=== Florida / Miami Marlins (2011–2015) ===
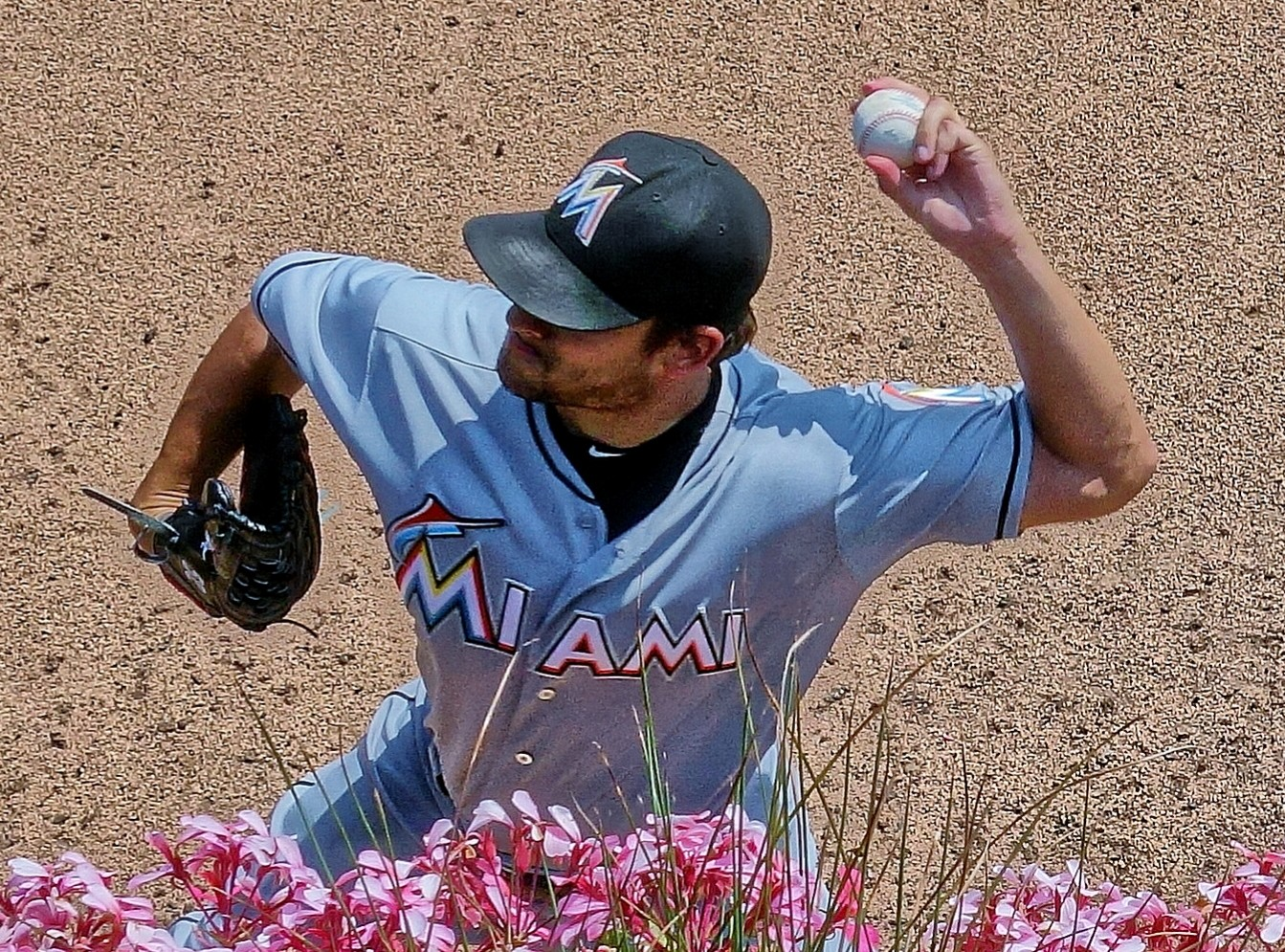
Hand with the Marlins in 2015

Hand returned to the Suns to begin the 2011 baseball season, the only left-handed pitcher in both the starting rotation and bullpen. The Marlins, who were in need of an additional starting pitcher when Josh Johnson was placed on the disabled list, promoted Hand to Florida on June 6, 2011. At the time, he was 7–1 with a 3.53 ERA in Jacksonville. He made his MLB debut the next day, allowing only one earned run on one hit – a solo home run to Álex González in the fourth inning – in six innings against the Atlanta Braves, but took the loss as the Marlins were shut out 1–0. His first major league win came on July 8, 2011, Hand's fifth start, when he held the Houston Astros to two hits in five innings of a 5–0 shutout win. After the game, the Marlins optioned Hand, who had a 1–3 record and 2.77 ERA, back down to Jacksonville so he could continue to pitch during the All-Star Game break. He received three more major league promotions between July and September, but was sent back down both times as he struggled both with controlling his pitches and with allowing home runs. Johnson remained sidelined with a shoulder injury throughout that period, and in his absence, reliever Clay Hensley had become a starting pitcher. With the team out of playoff contention by September, however, manager Jack McKeon sent Hensley back to the bullpen and allowed Hand to start the final stretch of games and sell himself as a major league player for the 2012 season. In his first season with the Marlins, Hand went 1–8 with a 4.20 ERA in 12 starts, and he recorded 38 strikeouts in 60 innings. He was 11–4 with a 3.40 ERA in 19 Jacksonville games, meanwhile, all but one of which were starts, and struck out 71 batters in 108 2/3 innings.

While Hand made a change to the angle of his throwing arm during the 2011–12 offseason, which helped him throw more strikes in spring training, he did not make the Miami Marlins' (Note: The team rebranded from the Florida to the Miami Marlins for the 2012 season after moving to Marlins Park.) 2012 Opening Day roster, and was instead assigned to Jacksonville on March 18. He instead started the minor league season with the Triple-A New Orleans Zephyrs as part of a starting rotation that also included Tom Koehler, Alex Sanabia, Wade LeBlanc, and J. D. Martin. Hand received his first MLB call-up of the season on August 3 to pitch in the second game of a doubleheader against the Washington Nationals. The MLB collective bargaining agreement allowed a player like Hand to join a team as the 26th person on their 25-man roster for a same-day doubleheader as long as he was sent back to the minors the next day. At the time of his promotion, Hand was 8–5 in New Orleans, with a 3.66 ERA, 116 strikeouts, and 54 walks. He struggled in his lone start, allowing seven runs on six hits and six walks in 3 2/3 innings. Hand was removed from the game after throwing 97 pitches in less than four innings, including a 33-pitch first inning, and the Nationals won 7–2. Hand made 27 starts with the Zephyrs in 2012, going 11–7 with a 4.00 ERA in the process, and he struck out 141 batters in 148 1/3 innings while issuing 75 walks.

Hand returned to the Zephyrs to begin the 2013 season in the Pacific Coast League. After the Marlins used 11 pitchers in a 15-inning game against the New York Mets on April 30, Hand was briefly promoted to Miami as a fresh arm, but he was sent back down two days later after making one relief appearance. On May 21, Hand injured his oblique during pregame warmups with the Zephyrs. He spent nine weeks on the disabled list; on July 30, his first start since returning from the injury, Hand held the Colorado Springs Sky Sox to three hits in five scoreless innings, earning a no decision. On August 5, he struck out 11 batters and allowed one hit in six scoreless innings, taking the win in a 5–1 game against the Reno Aces. He was named the Pacific Coast League Player of the Week for these two performances. In 15 starts for New Orleans, Hand went 3–5 with a 3.42 ERA, striking out 81 batters in 81 2/3 innings. He was a September call-up for the Marlins in 2013 as a relief pitcher who could make occasional starts as needed. His first major league start of the season came on September 13 against the Mets. Hand initially had a promising outing, walking only two batters in 5 1/3 innings, but the three-run home run he allowed to Lucas Duda in the sixth inning led to a 4–3 Marlins loss. His first win since 2011, meanwhile, came on September 18, when Hand pitched a scoreless ninth inning against the Philadelphia Phillies in a game that the Marlins won 4–3 in extra innings. Hand appeared in seven major league games that season, two starts and five relief appearances, and went 1–1 with a 3.05 ERA while striking out 15 batters in 20 2/3 innings.

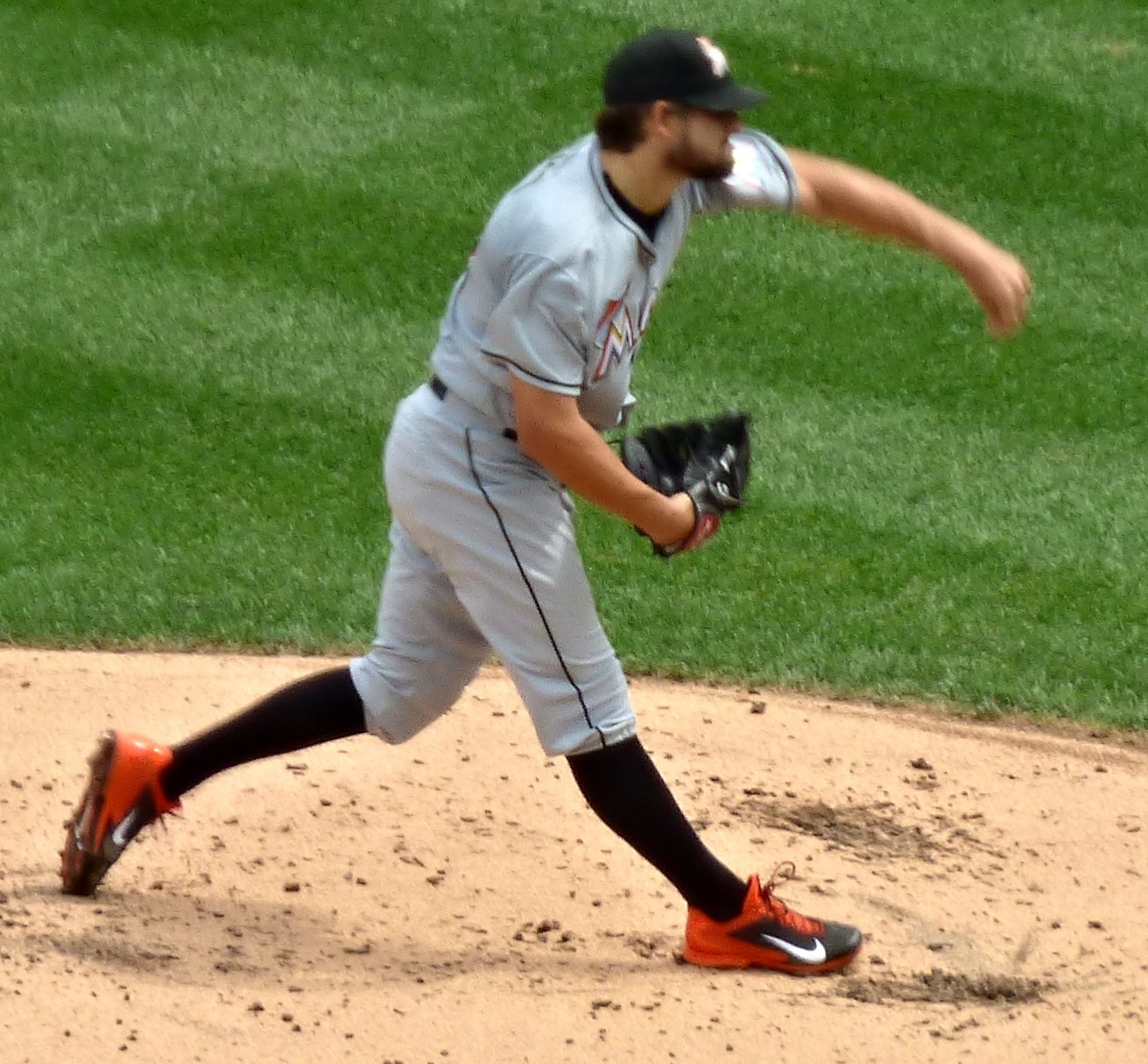
Hand with the Marlins in 2015

After spending spring training in contention with Tom Koehler and Brian Flynn for the final spot in the Marlins' starting rotation, Hand, who went 2–1 with a 2.70 ERA in exhibition games, made Miami's Opening Day roster as a reliever. He struggled in his new role as a long reliever, going 0–1 with a 6.38 ERA in 16 appearances, 14 of which came in relief, before he was placed on the disabled list with a sprained ankle on May 24. When he returned from his rehabilitation assignment in July, Hand was added to the starting rotation, which had lost both the injured José Fernández and struggling Jacob Turner, the latter of whom had become the team's new long reliever. It initially appeared as if he would break out in the rotation, going 2–2 with a 2.70 ERA in six July starts, but Hand soon returned to the bullpen when he went 0–3 with a 6.17 ERA in August. He was able to end the season on a high note with a 1–2 record and 3.00 ERA in his last four September starts. Altogether, Hand made 32 appearances for the Marlins in 2014, half starts and half in relief. He went 3–8 with a 4.38 ERA, striking out 67 batters in 111 innings.

In 2015, Hand and the newly acquired David Phelps spent spring training preparing as backup starters in case the Marlins quickly lost a member of their rotation to injury, as they had the season prior. He was also out of minor league options that season and required a strong spring training to avoid being traded or placed on waivers. After posting a 1.54 ERA in spring exhibition games, Hand joined the Opening Day roster as one of the Marlins' two left-handed relievers. He received his first start of the season on May 27 against the Pittsburgh Pirates following injuries to Henderson Alvarez and Mat Latos. Hand earned a no decision as he held the Pirates to four hits in five innings, but the Marlins lost 5–2 after poor outings from relievers Mike Dunn and Sam Dyson. After allowing six runs to the Toronto Blue Jays in an 11–3 loss on June 8, Hand did not start a game again until August 5, when he pitched four scoreless innings and left the Marlins with a 1–0 lead against the Mets. Hand only earned a no decision, however, as the Marlins lost the game 5–1, giving him a 6–20 career record. He broke the Marlins' six-game losing streak in his next start on August 10 when, in addition to allowing only one run on two hits in seven innings, he successfully utilized two sacrifice bunts to lead the Marlins to a 4–1 win over the Atlanta Braves. Hand was the first Marlin in franchise history to record two RBI sacrifice bunts in one game and was the first MLB player to do so since Alex Cora 11 years prior. Hand appeared in 38 games for the Marlins in 2015, 12 as a starter and 26 in relief, and he went 4–7 with a 5.30 ERA while striking out 67 batters in 93 1/3 innings.

=== San Diego Padres (2016–2018) ===
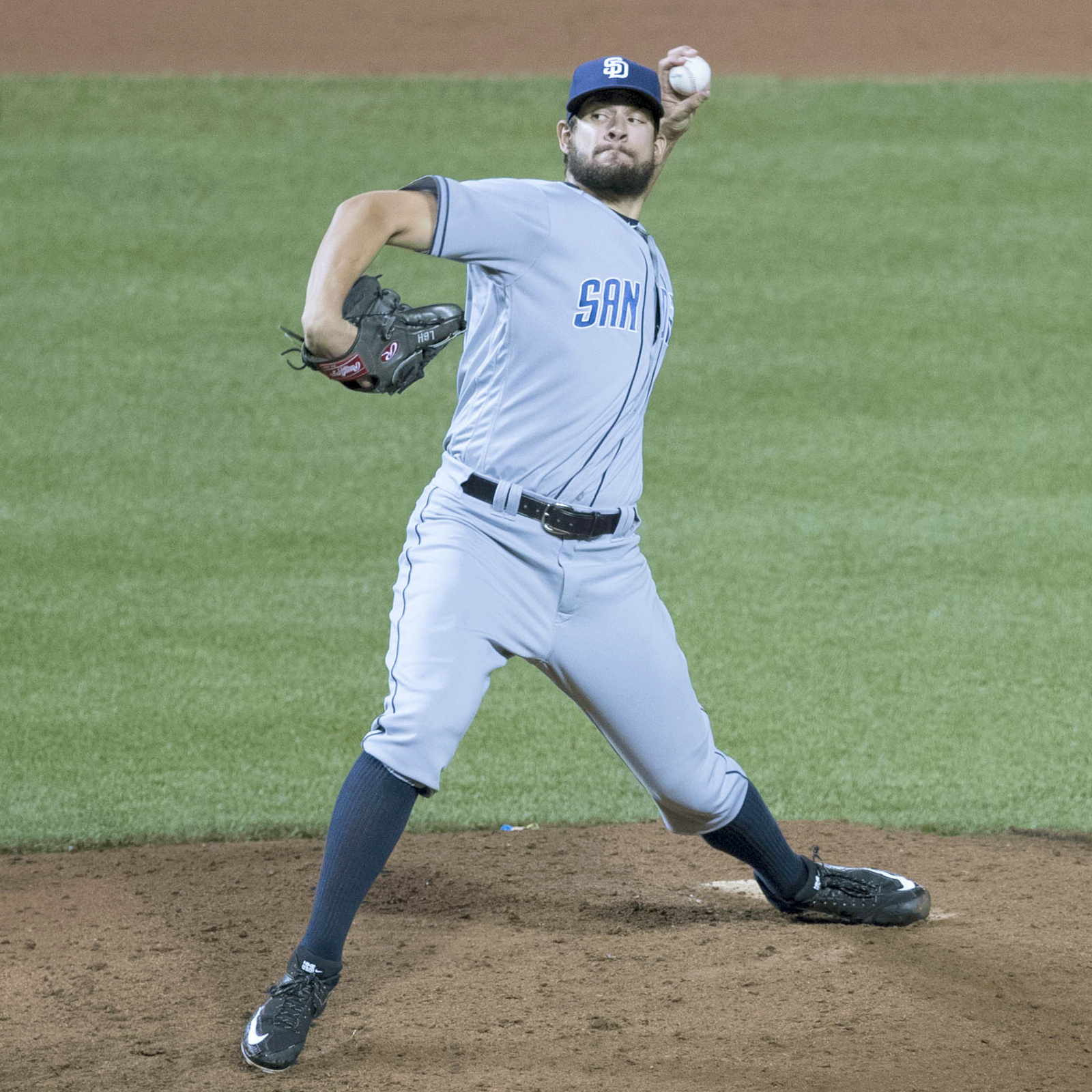
Hand with the Padres in 2016

Hand struggled in spring training with the Marlins in 2016, allowing 10 runs on 11 hits in 11 innings for an 8.18 ERA, and he was designated for assignment on April 8. The San Diego Padres subsequently claimed Hand on waivers to fill the final spot on their 40-man roster. Manager Andy Green expected that Hand would serve both in long relief and in more specialized inning roles for the Padres' bullpen. The trade led to a breakout season for Hand, who had a 3.04 ERA in 51 appearances by the July 31 trading deadline. He was particularly successful against left-handed batters, holding them to a .151 batting average against. He also had two stretches that season where he faced 20 or more left-handed batters in a row without allowing a hit. On September 14, Hand struck out his 100th batter of the season, Kelby Tomlinson of the San Francisco Giants. He was the sixth reliever in Padres history to strike out 100 or more batters in a season and was the second left-handed reliever on any MLB team to reach the milestone in 2016, following Andrew Miller of the Cleveland Indians. He led all MLB relievers with 82 appearances in 2016, during which he went 4–4 with a career-low 2.92 ERA and struck out a career-high 111 batters in 89 1/3 innings. Left-handed batters had a .421 on-base plus slugging (OPS) against him, but he was also successful against right-handed hitters, holding them to a .689 OPS.

Shortly before the 2017 season, Hand agreed to a one-year contract extension with the Padres. Equipped with a new slider, Hand had a strong start to the 2017 season, making it through his first six appearances without allowing a run. By the end of June, he had a 2.59 ERA and was recording 11 strikeouts per nine innings (K/9), while opponents were batting only .120 against his slider. After posting a 2.42 ERA and a 0.94 walks plus hits per innings pitched (WHIP) through 40 appearances, Hand received his first MLB All-Star Game selection in 2017. There, he pitched a perfect seventh inning for the National League (NL) team, who ultimately lost 2–1 in extra innings. Shortly afterwards, Hand was named the NL Reliever of the Month for July 2017, having maintained a 19 1/3-inning scoreless streak and 0.88 WHIP that month. Primarily a setup man, Hand received his first save opportunity of the season on May 24, when he exchanged places with struggling closer Brandon Maurer. Hand came into the game in the ninth inning with the bases loaded and escaped the outing with two strikeouts and a flyout, helping the Padres defeat the Mets 6–5. The Padres traded Maurer to the Kansas City Royals shortly before the trading deadline, at which point Hand took over the ninth-inning role for San Diego. Hand finished a career-best year with a 2.16 ERA, 5.20 strikeout-to-walk ratio, 11.8 K/9, and 0.933 WHIP. He also made 21 saves, most of which came after the Maurer trade.

On January 14, 2018, the Padres signed Hand to a three-year, $19.75 million contract extension that also included an option for the 2021 season. He was officially named as the team's 2018 closer during spring training, but he also made appearances in other high-leverage situations, such as when the Padres faced the heart of the Colorado Rockies' lineup – Charlie Blackmon, Nolan Arenado, and David Dahl – in the seventh inning of a game. On April 18, Hand struck out all four Giants batters he faced, becoming the first Padres pitcher to strike out every batter he faced in a multi-inning save. After converting all 10 save opportunities he faced, MLB named Hand the NL Pitcher of the Month for May. Hand's pitching appeared to improve with its frequency: by mid-June, he had a 1.23 ERA working on two or fewer days of rest between appearances, compared to a 7.11 ERA with three or more days of rest. While he struggled in June and July, with three blown saves boosting his ERA from 2.30 to 3.05, Hand pitched another perfect inning in his second All-Star Game, retiring all three batters he faced in the eighth inning. Making 41 appearances for the Padres in 2018, Hand went 2–4 with a 3.05 ERA, converting 24 of 29 save opportunities while striking out 65 batters in 44 1/3 innings.

=== Cleveland Indians (2018–2020) ===
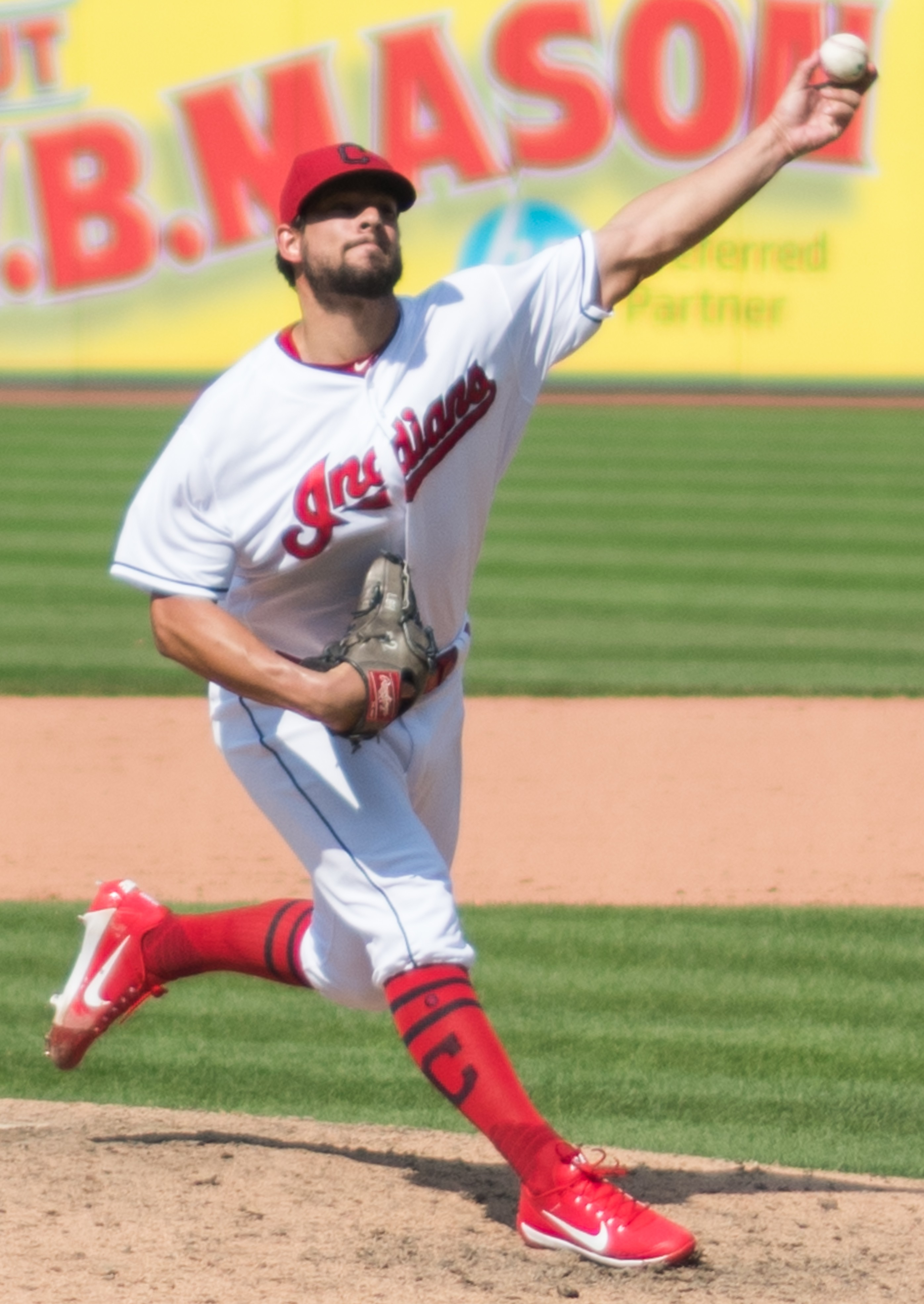
Hand with the Indians in 2018

On July 19, 2018, the Padres traded Hand and Adam Cimber to the Cleveland Indians, who were poised to lose several relievers to free agency during the 2018–19 offseason, in exchange for catching prospect Francisco Mejia. On his new team, Hand became a setup man for Cleveland closer Cody Allen, who had 19 saves on the season but had blown several attempts, including a game that Trevor Bauer left 4–0 against the Cincinnati Reds that ended in a 7–4 loss for the Indians. By late August, while Allen remained the de facto closer for the Indians, Hand, who allowed only two earned runs in 14 appearances, was receiving save opportunities. After being traded, Hand made 28 appearances for Cleveland, finishing 11 games, and he went 0–1 with a 2.28 ERA while converting eight of 10 save opportunities. The Indians, meanwhile, were the AL Central division champions, giving Hand his first playoff appearance in the 2018 American League Division Series against the Houston Astros. The Astros swept the Indians in the best-of-five series, with Hand allowing Correa's first hit of the series, a three-run home run in Game 3.

Prior to spring training, Indians manager Terry Francona announced that Hand would be the team's closer for the 2019 season. He was 22-for-22 in save opportunities until June 25, when Hunter Dozier hit a grand slam against Hand in the ninth inning of the Indians' game against the Royals, giving Kansas City a three-run lead. Hand's ERA jumped from 1.05 to 2.36 after the outing, and the Indians lost 8–6. He received his third consecutive All-Star Game selection in 2019 after striking out 52 batters in 27 appearances. Hand was far less successful in the second half of the season, which he attributed to a mechanical issue with his slider delivery. After his first blown save, he had a 6.95 ERA, a .347 batting average against, and five more blown saves in 22 innings. Following a stretch of 19 games in which Hand allowed 12 earned runs on 26 hits for a 6.00 ERA, the Indians sent their pitcher back to Cleveland in the middle of a road trip to undergo medical imaging. He was sidelined between September 9 and 20 with what was described as a "tired arm", after which he made only one more appearance to finish out the season. In 60 appearances for Cleveland, Hand went 6–4 with a 3.30 ERA and converted 34 of 39 save opportunities while striking out 84 batters in 57 1/3 innings.

As Francona did not want to use the same reliever three days in a row during the 2020 MLB season, which was shortened to only 60 games due to the COVID-19 pandemic, Hand was not the only pitcher called on to save games for the Indians, instead joined in the closing role by rookies Cam Hill and James Karinchak. Outside of one early-season appearance against the Chicago White Sox on July 29, in which Hand loaded the bases to set the Indians up for a 4–0 loss, he was sharp for the Indians in the shortened season, going 1–1 and converting all 12 save opportunities in his first 16 appearances. He made 23 appearances for the Indians that season, including an AL-leading 21 games finished, and went 2–1 with a 2.05 ERA while also leading the AL by going 16-for-16 on save opportunities. This success came despite his average fastball velocity dropping down to 91.4 mph (147.1 km/h) in 2020, more than 2 mph (3.2 km/h) lower than it had been when he was acquired by the Indians. At the end of the season, Hand was named to the All-MLB Second Team and was a finalist for AL Reliever of the Year, an award which ultimately went to Liam Hendriks of the Oakland Athletics.

Because the 2020 regular season was shortened to only 60 games, the playoffs expanded from 10 to 16 teams, all of whom began the postseason in a best-of-three "wild card" matchup. The Indians, who finished the season as the No. 4 seed in the AL, hosted the No. 5 New York Yankees in the 2020 American League Wild Card Series. Hand did not play in Game 1, which the Yankees won in a 12–3 rout. Two days later, he entered Game 2 in the ninth inning with the Indians up 9–8. He first allowed Gary Sánchez to tie the game on a sacrifice fly that brought home Mike Tauchman, and then DJ LeMahieu hit an RBI single to score Gio Urshela from second base, giving the Yankees a 10–9 lead. Aroldis Chapman held the Indians scoreless to end the game, giving the Yankees the win and eliminating Cleveland from the postseason. Shortly afterwards, the Indians placed Hand on outright waivers; when he passed through the waiver process unclaimed, they bought out the remainder of his contract for $1 million, releasing him into free agency.

=== Washington Nationals (2021) ===
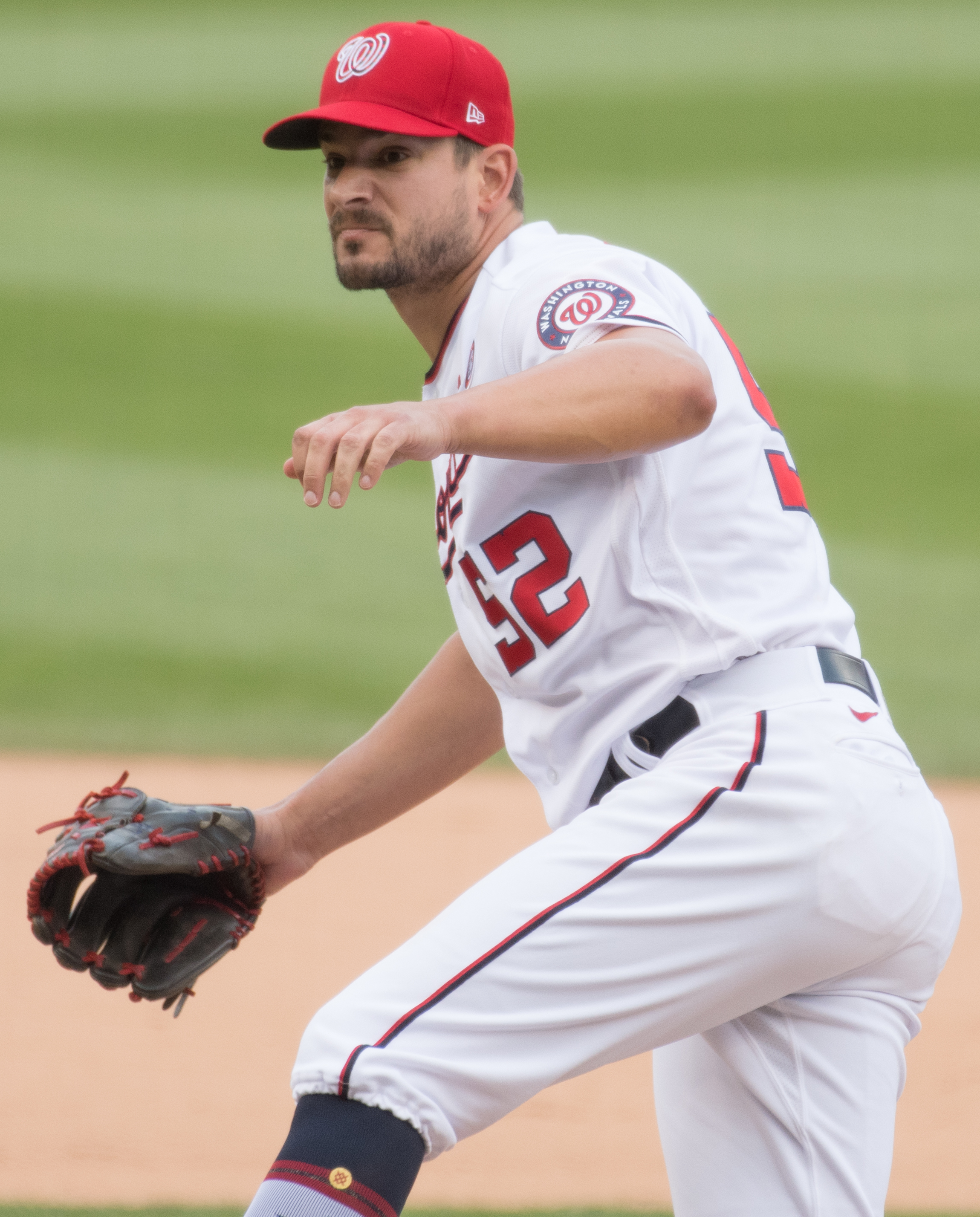
Hand with the Nationals in 2021

The Washington Nationals, who had lost their only left-handed reliever after Sean Doolittle became a free agent that offseason, signed Hand to a one-year, $10.5 million contract on January 26, 2021. Serving once again as his team's closer, Hand blew his first regular-season save since 2019 on May 8 against the Yankees. He first took the game into extra innings by allowing DJ LeMahieu to tie in the ninth inning. Trea Turner put the Nationals up 3–2 in the top of the 10th inning, but Hand allowed a Mike Ford RBI to tie the game again, and Tanner Rainey lost the game 4–3 when he allowed Gleyber Torres to walk off in the 11th. After more difficult outings raised Hand's May ERA to 7.56, he made a fastball adjustment that was followed by two clean saves in a row. He was more successful from May 22 to July 20, with a 1.52 ERA in 22 appearances during that stretch, but ended his tenure in Washington with seven runs allowed in 2 2/3 innings in his last three appearances. Limited by his difficulties in finding the strike zone, Hand was 5–5 with a 3.59 ERA in 41 appearances for the Nationals, and he converted 21 of 26 save opportunities.

=== Toronto Blue Jays (2021) ===
As the Nationals fell behind in the NL East through the first part of the season, they became aggressive sellers at the trading deadline. On July 29, 2021, the Nationals traded Hand to the Toronto Blue Jays in exchange for catching prospect Riley Adams. While Toronto did not have a designated closer, the trade allowed them to partner the left-handed Hand with the right-handed Jordan Romano in late innings. He could not find success with his new team: his first 11 appearances for the Blue Jays included two losses, a blown save, and a walk-off walk to the Seattle Mariners. He referred to his time in Toronto as "the toughest stretch I've ever been through in my career" and could not explain why his fastball command was so poor, as they could not isolate any mechanical difficulties. In 8 2/3 innings across 11 appearances for Toronto, Hand went 0–2 with a 7.27 ERA, and he was designated for assignment on August 31.

=== New York Mets (2021) ===
On September 2, 2021, the New York Mets claimed Hand off of waivers from the Blue Jays. Because he was not with the team on September 1, Hand was ineligible to appear in the postseason for the Mets, but was added to the bullpen to help them clinch a potential playoff berth in the final month of the regular season. This bid was ultimately unsuccessful, as the Mets were eliminated from playoff contention with a 2–1 loss to the Milwaukee Brewers on September 25. Hand made 16 appearances for New York in September, and while he had a 1–0 record and 2.70 ERA, he also allowed five of the six runners he inherited to score, and the Mets stopped placing him in high-leverage situations as a result. He became a free agent at the end of the season.

=== Philadelphia Phillies (2022) ===
On March 16, 2022, the Philadelphia Phillies signed Hand to a one-year, $6 million contract. Interim manager Rob Thomson did not assign relief pitchers to specific innings, and Hand was instead utilized in late innings when the Phillies were set to face a string of left-handed batters. He saw increased usage in August when Corey Knebel and Seranthony Domínguez were both sideliend with injuries, before landing on the injured list with left elbow tendinitis at the end of September. Hand appeared in 55 regular-season games for the Phillies, going 3–2 with a 2.80 ERA and five saves in 45 innings. The Phillies advanced to the postseason for the first time since 2011, with Hand making seven appearances in the postseason. This included two shutout innings against the Houston Astros during the 2022 World Series, which Philadelphia lost in six games.

=== Colorado Rockies (2023) ===
On March 4, 2023, the Colorado Rockies signed Hand to a one-year, $2 million contract, with a team option for 2024. Colorado had been in need of a veteran left-handed reliever after losing Lucas Gilbreath to Tommy John surgery. After using exclusively a four-seam fastball and slider combination since 2017, Hand introduced a cutter to his pitch rotation upon joining the Rockies. He had a strong start to the season, with 12 scoreless appearances in his first 16 outings for the Rockies, but then posted a 5.75 ERA in his next 24 appearances. This included back-to-back July outings in which he allowed four runs in one inning against the Detroit Tigers, followed by two runs in 1 2/3 innings against the San Francisco Giants. In 40 appearances for the Rockies that season, Hand had a 4.54 ERA, striking out 41 batters in 35 2/3 innings.

=== Atlanta Braves (2023) ===
On August 1, 2023, the Rockies traded Hand to the Atlanta Braves in exchange for minor league pitcher Alec Barger. There, he was their third left-handed option out of the bullpen, behind A. J. Minter and Dylan Lee. He made 20 appearances after the trade, during which he went 2–2 with a 7.50 ERA, striking out 18 batters in 18 innings. Hand also pitched one inning in Game 3 of the 2023 NLDS against the Phillies, during which he allowed a home run to Bryce Harper. At the end of the season, the Braves declined their end of Hand's $7 million mutual option for 2024, making him a free agent.

== Pitching style ==
Hand's signature pitch is his slider, which he developed in 2015 with the aid of Marlins pitching coach Chuck Hernandez. He used the pitch less than 10 percent of the time during his final season in Miami, but it made up 36 percent of his pitches with the Padres in 2016 and 44 percent in 2017. By 2019, more than half of his pitchers were sliders. The slider effectively replaced Hand's curveball, which he abandoned when he became a relief pitcher, as he had difficulty throwing it for strikes. The slider is paired with a fastball, which is typically thrown as a sinker. Hand prefers to use the sinking fastball against right-handed hitters, either on the first pitch or when ahead on strikes. At their peak in 2018, Hand's average velocity was 93.6 mph (150.6 km/h) for his fastball and 82.1 mph (132.1 km/h) for his slider. Two years later, these speeds had dropped to 91.4 mph (147.1 km/h) for the fastball and 79.6 mph (128.1 km/h) for the slider.

== Personal life ==
Hand married his wife Morgan on February 28, 2015, and they had their first child together that same year. Their second child, Cuyler, was born in 2017. During the baseball offseason, the Hands live in Jupiter, Florida.

In 2019, shortly after he was traded to the Indians, Hand began the Helping Hands charity organization. Originally created to aid the Cleveland chapter of the Boys & Girls Clubs of America, the organization also aids youth baseball and softball organizations and has partnered with OhioGuidestone, which provides foster care, family services, and behavioral health services around the Cleveland area. Hand was the Indians' 2020 nominee for the Roberto Clemente Award, given for sportsmanship and philanthropy.
