= Beau Taylor =

American baseball player (born 1990)

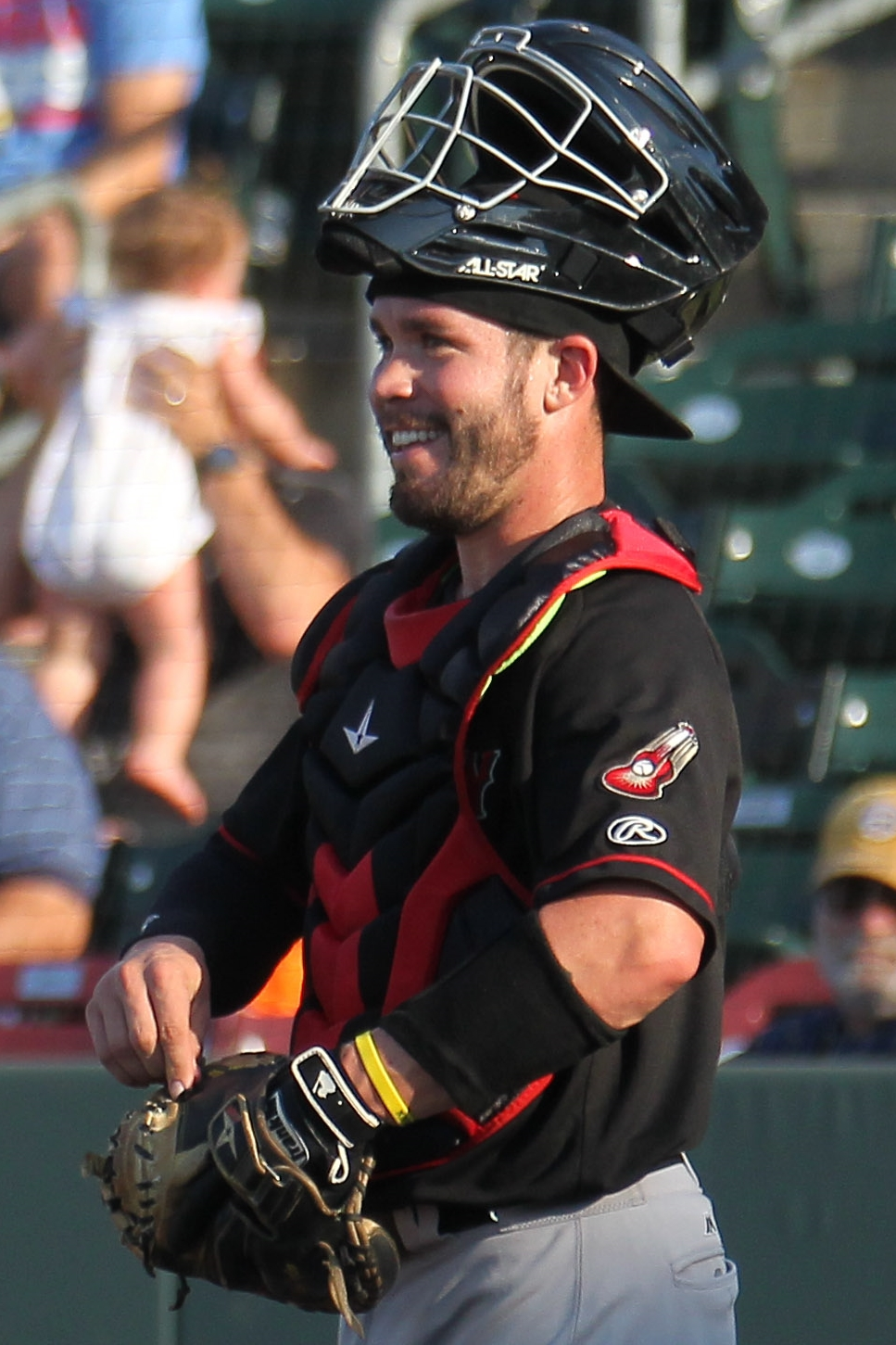
- Taylor with the Nashville Sounds
- Catcher
- Born: February 13, 1990 (age 36); Rockledge, Florida, U.S.
- Batted: Left Threw: Right

MLB debut
- September 1, 2018, for the Oakland Athletics

Last MLB appearance
- August 23, 2020, for the Cleveland Indians

MLB statistics
- Batting average: .118
- Home runs: 2
- Runs batted in: 4
- Stats at Baseball Reference

Teams
- Oakland Athletics (2018–2019); Toronto Blue Jays (2019); Oakland Athletics (2019); Cleveland Indians (2020)

Beau Ritchie Taylor (born February 13, 1990) is an American former professional baseball catcher. He played in Major League Baseball (MLB) for the Oakland Athletics, Toronto Blue Jays, and Cleveland Indians from 2018 to 2020.

== Playing career ==
=== Amateur ===
Taylor attended Rockledge High School in Rockledge, Florida and the University of Central Florida (UCF). He played for the UCF Knights baseball team, joining the team as a third baseman but converting to catcher to keep his scholarship. In 2010, he played collegiate summer baseball in the Cape Cod Baseball League for the Yarmouth-Dennis Red Sox.

=== Oakland Athletics ===
The Oakland Athletics selected Taylor in the fifth round, with the 166th overall selection, of the 2011 Major League Baseball draft. He split his first professional season between the Low-A Vermont Lake Monsters and Single-A Burlington Bees. Taylor spent 2012 with the High-A Stockton Ports and Double-A Midland RockHounds, playing in 88 total games and hitting .292/.372/.381 with three home runs and 44 RBI.

Taylor returned to Midland in 2013, hitting .191/.282/.266 with three home runs and 32 RBI across 76 appearances. He split the 2014 season between Midland and Stockton, slashing .272/.360/.424 with eight home runs and 53 RBI over 95 total appearances. Taylor remainder with the two affiliates in 2015, batting .223/.322/.335 with six home runs, 39 RBI, and two stolen bases in 85 games. In 2016, Taylor spent his fifth consecutive season with Midland, playing in 95 contests and hitting .280/.383/.398 with five home runs and 53 RBI.

Taylor was suspended for the first 50 games of the 2017 season due to testing positive for Adderall without a prescription. He ultimately played in 62 games split between Midland and the Triple-A Nashville Sounds, batting .295/.378/.424 with five home runs and 24 RBI. Taylor became a free agent after the 2017 season, and signed a new contract with the Athletics.

On September 1, 2018, Taylor was selected to the 40-man roster and promoted to the major leagues for the first time. In seven games during his rookie campaign, he went 1–for–5 (.200) with one walk. On November 2, Taylor was removed from the 40–man roster and sent outright to Triple–A. He rejected the assignment and elected free agency the same day.

On November 9, 2018, Taylor re-signed with Oakland on a minor league contract. He was assigned to Triple–A Las Vegas to begin the season. On June 8, 2019, Oakland added Taylor to their major league roster following an injury to Nick Hundley. On June 18, Taylor hit his first major league home run off Gabriel Ynoa in a 16–2 victory over the Baltimore Orioles. On August 14, Taylor was designated for assignment following the promotion of Corban Joseph.

=== Toronto Blue Jays ===
On August 16, 2019, Taylor was claimed off waivers by the Toronto Blue Jays. He played in one game for Toronto, going 0–for–2, and spent most of his time with the Triple–A Buffalo Bisons. On September 7, Taylor was designated for assignment after Anthony Kay was promoted.

=== Oakland Athletics (second stint) ===
On September 10, 2019, the Oakland Athletics claimed Taylor off waivers. On September 25, Taylor was designated for assignment. He elected free agency on October 8.

=== Cleveland Indians ===
On December 6, 2019, Taylor signed a minor league contract with the Cleveland Indians. The Indians selected Taylor's contract on July 28, 2020. Overall with the 2020 Cleveland Indians, Taylor batted .048 with no home runs and two RBI in seven games. On March 27, 2021, Taylor was designated for assignment.

=== Cincinnati Reds ===
On April 3, 2021, Taylor was claimed off waivers by the Cincinnati Reds. Taylor spent the 2021 season with the Triple-A Louisville Bats. He played in 75 games for Louisville, hitting .255 with 4 home runs and 23 RBI. On September 27, Taylor was designated for assignment by the Reds. On October 13, Taylor elected free agency.

=== Baltimore Orioles ===
On March 18, 2022, Taylor signed a minor league contract with the Baltimore Orioles. Taylor played in 23 games for the Triple-A Norfolk Tides, hitting .183/.352/.282 with 2 home runs and 5 RBI. He was released by the Orioles organization on July 20.

=== Oakland Athletics (third stint) ===
On July 29, 2022, Taylor signed a minor league deal with the Oakland Athletics. Playing in 27 games for the Triple-A Las Vegas Aviators to close out the year, Taylor slashed .250/.375/.430 with 4 home runs and 13 RBI. He elected free agency following the season on November 10.

=== High Point Rockers ===
On April 28, 2023, Taylor signed with the High Point Rockers of the Atlantic League of Professional Baseball. In 77 games for the Rockers, Taylor hit .291/.386/.453 with 9 home runs and 61 RBI.

=== Seattle Mariners ===
On April 9, 2024, Taylor signed a minor league contract with the Seattle Mariners. However, on April 14, it was announced that Taylor had retired and taken the first base coach role with the Mariners' Triple–A affiliate, the Tacoma Rainiers.

On January 15, 2025, Taylor came out of retirement and signed a minor league contract with the Mariners. He did not appear for the organization however, and elected free agency following the season on November 6.

== Coaching career ==
On February 6, 2026, Taylor was announced as the assistant hitting coach for the Midland RockHounds, the Double-A affiliate of the Athletics.
