= Conner Capel =

American baseball player (born 1997)

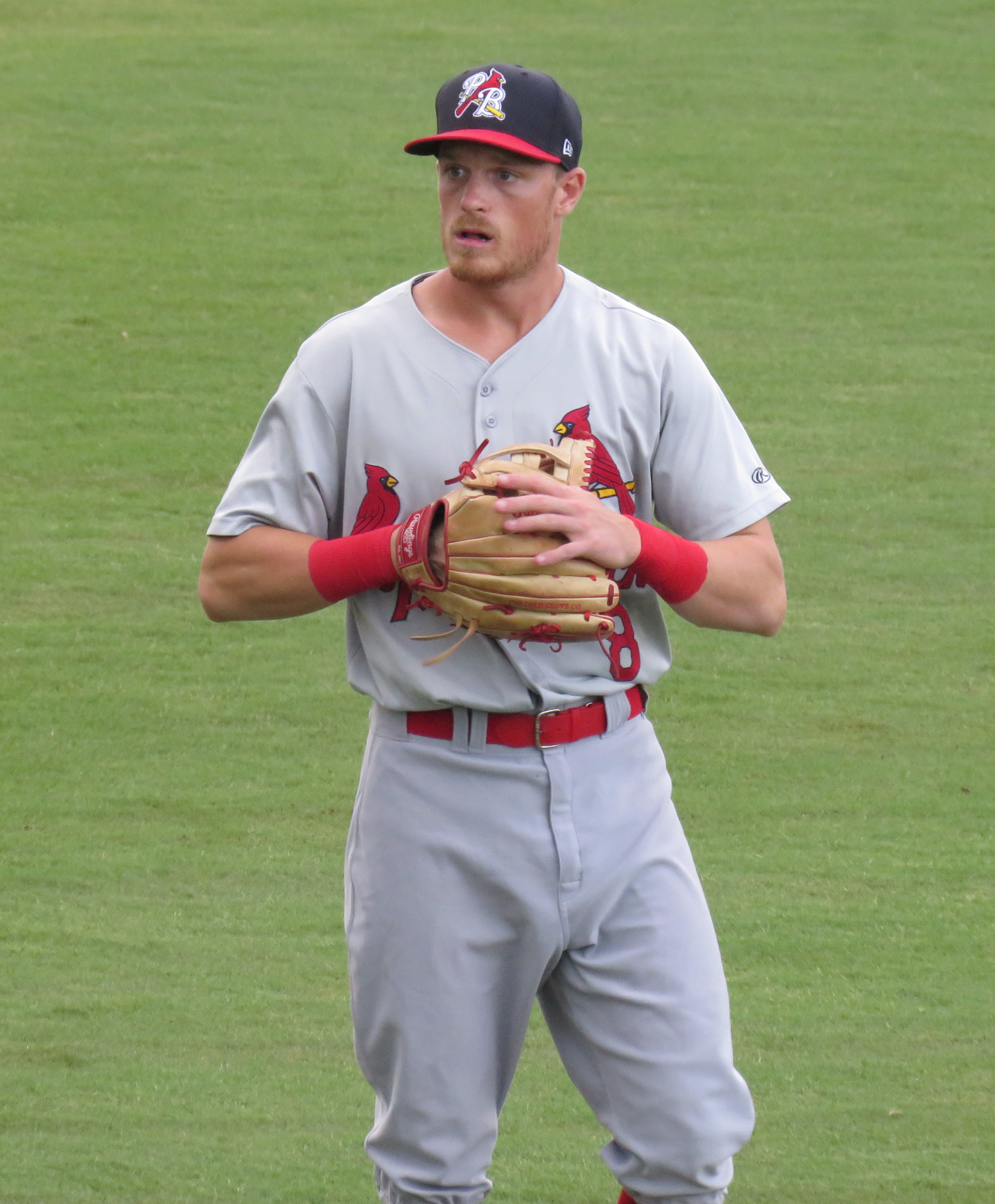
- Capel with the Palm Beach Cardinals in 2018

Free agent
- Outfielder
- Born: May 19, 1997 (age 29); Katy, Texas, U.S.
- Bats: Left Throws: Left

MLB debut
- June 27, 2022, for the St. Louis Cardinals

MLB statistics (through 2024 season)
- Batting average: .278
- Home runs: 3
- Runs batted in: 14
- Stats at Baseball Reference

Teams
- St. Louis Cardinals (2022); Oakland Athletics (2022–2023); Cincinnati Reds (2024)

Michael Conner Capel (born May 19, 1997) is an American professional baseball outfielder who is a free agent. He has previously played in Major League Baseball (MLB) for the St. Louis Cardinals, Oakland Athletics, and Cincinnati Reds.

== Amateur career ==
Capel attended Seven Lakes High School in Katy, Texas, and played on their baseball team. As a senior, he batted .456 with 36 runs, 27 doubles, and 23 stolen bases. He committed to play college baseball for the Texas Longhorns. He was selected by the Cleveland Indians in the fifth round of the 2016 Major League Baseball draft, and he signed with them for $361,300, forgoing his commitment to Texas.

== Professional career ==
=== Cleveland Indians ===
After signing, Capel was assigned to the Rookie-level Arizona League Indians to make his professional debut. For the season, he slashed .210/.270/.290 with 13 RBI and ten stolen bases in 35 games. In 2017, he played for the Lake County Captains of the Single–A Midwest League where he batted .246 with 22 home runs, 61 RBI, and a .795 OPS over 119 games. He began 2018 with the Lynchburg Hillcats of the High–A Carolina League.

=== St. Louis Cardinals ===
Capel was traded to the St. Louis Cardinals on July 31, 2018, along with Jhon Torres, in exchange for Óscar Mercado. He was assigned to the Palm Beach Cardinals of the High–A Florida State League and ended the season there. Over 118 games between Lynchburg and Palm Beach, he slashed .257/.341/.376 with seven home runs, 63 RBI, and 15 stolen bases. Capel began the 2019 season with the Springfield Cardinals of the Double–A Texas League. In June, he played eight games with the Memphis Redbirds of the Triple–A Pacific Coast League. Over 106 games between the two teams, Capel hit .248 with 11 home runs and 47 RBI. After the season, he played in the Arizona Fall League for the Glendale Desert Dogs.

In July 2020, Capel signed on to play for Team Texas of the Constellation Energy League, a makeshift 4-team independent league created as a result of the COVID-19 pandemic which caused the cancellation of the minor league season. He hit .200 with one home run and six RBI over 27 games for Team Texas. For the 2021 season, Capel returned to Memphis, slashing .261/.342/.448 with 14 home runs, 51 RBI, and 17 doubles over 114 games. He returned to Memphis to begin the 2022 season.

On June 27, 2022, the Cardinals selected Capel's contract and promoted him to the major leagues. He made his MLB debut that night in the top of the ninth inning as a defensive replacement against the Miami Marlins. He registered his first MLB hit on June 29 with a single off of Marlins starter Sandy Alcántara. Capel hit his first MLB home run on July 4 off of Jesse Chavez of the Atlanta Braves at Truist Park. On September 6, Capel was designated for assignment.

=== Oakland Athletics ===
On September 9, 2022, Capel was claimed off waivers by the Oakland Athletics. After making his A's debut, Capel became the first player in franchise history to wear the number 72.

In 32 games for Oakland in 2023, Capel batted .260/.372/.329 with three RBI and five stolen bases. On August 30, 2023, Capel was removed from the 40–man roster and sent outright to the Triple–A Las Vegas Aviators. He elected free agency following the season on November 6.

=== Cincinnati Reds ===
On December 26, 2023, Capel signed a minor league contract with the Cincinnati Reds. In 31 games for the Triple–A Louisville Bats, he hit .268/.397/.567 with seven home runs, 16 RBI, and six stolen bases. On May 7, 2024, the Reds selected Capel's contract, adding him to the major league roster. In five games for Cincinnati, he went 2–for–8 (.250). On June 21, Capel was designated for assignment by the Reds. He cleared waivers and was sent outright to Louisville on June 23. Capel was released by the Reds organization on August 3.

=== Atlanta Braves ===
On December 7, 2024, Capel signed a minor league contract with the Atlanta Braves. He made 119 appearances for the Triple-A Gwinnett Stripers in 2025, batting .234/.314/.360 with 10 home runs, 39 RBI, and 21 stolen bases. Capel elected free agency following the season on November 6, 2025.

=== Colorado Rockies ===
On February 5, 2026, Capel signed a minor league contract with the Colorado Rockies. In 119 games between Triple-A and Double-A he batted .251/.320/.436 with 16 home runs, 63 RBIs and 8 stolen bases. He elected free agency on November 2.

== Personal life ==
Capel's father, Mike Capel, played in Major League Baseball for the Chicago Cubs, Milwaukee Brewers, and Houston Astros. In 2019, Capel and Kacy Clemens filed a lawsuit against a bar in Houston alleging they were assaulted by a bouncer; they won and were awarded $3.24 million.
