= Óscar Mercado =

Colombian-American baseball player (born 1994)

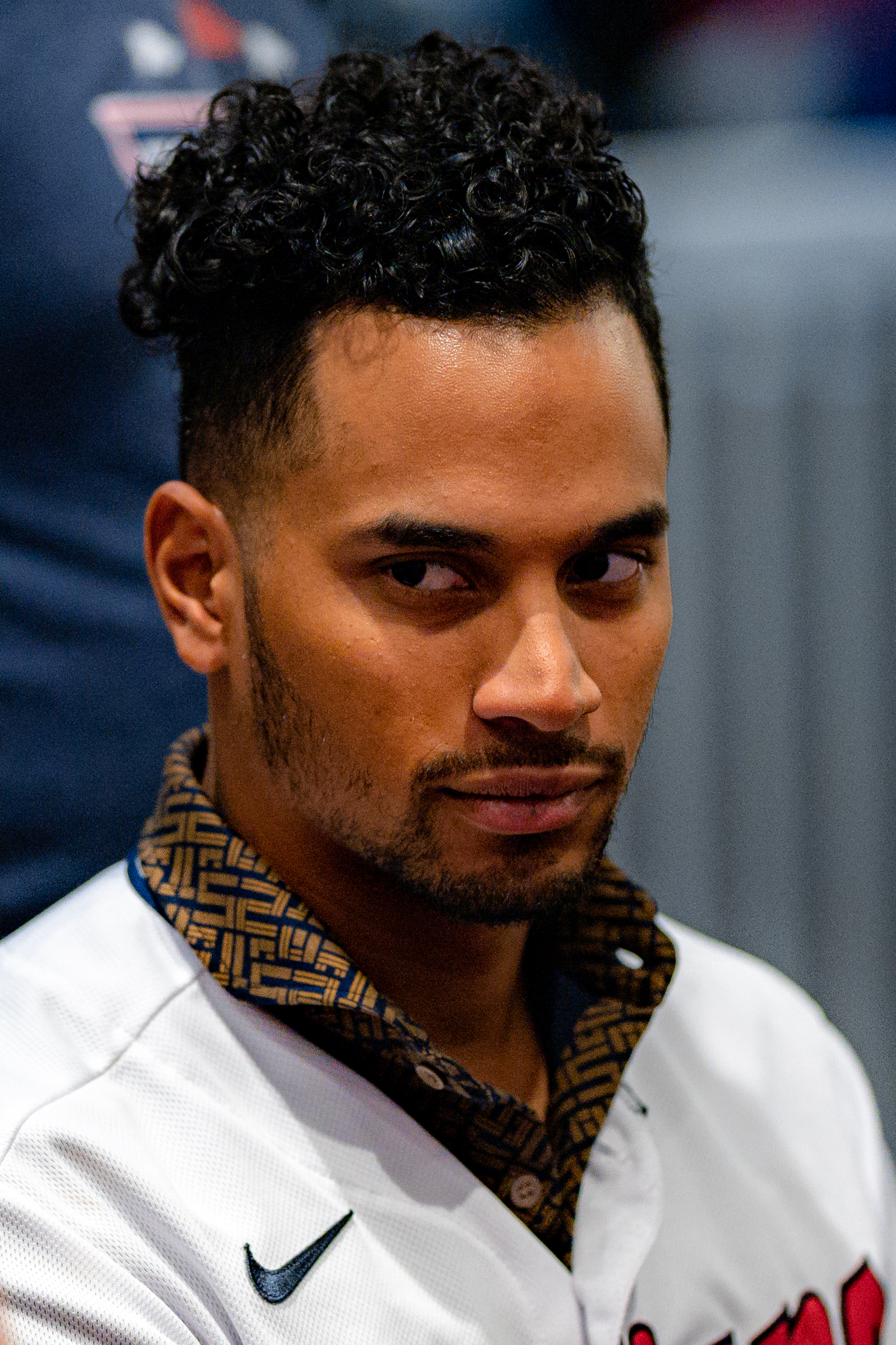
- Mercado with the Cleveland Indians in 2020

Free agent
- Outfielder
- Born: December 16, 1994 (age 31); Cartagena, Colombia
- Bats: Right Throws: Right

MLB debut
- May 14, 2019, for the Cleveland Indians

MLB statistics (through 2023 season)
- Batting average: .237
- Home runs: 26
- Runs batted in: 100
- Stats at Baseball Reference

Teams
- Cleveland Indians / Guardians (2019–2022); Philadelphia Phillies (2022); Cleveland Guardians (2022); St. Louis Cardinals (2023)

Óscar Mauricio Mercado (born December 16, 1994) is a Colombian-American professional baseball outfielder who is a free agent. He has previously played in Major League Baseball (MLB) for the Cleveland Indians / Guardians, Philadelphia Phillies, and St. Louis Cardinals. He represented the Colombian national baseball team at the 2017 World Baseball Classic.

== Early life ==
Mercado was born in Cartagena, Colombia. His father, Oscar Sr., played soccer and worked as a general contractor. He has an older brother, Juan, and a twin sister, Nathalia. His family emigrated to the United States when he was seven years old on his father's work visa, and settled in Tampa, Florida.

Mercado attended Gaither High School in Tampa, Florida. He committed to play college baseball at Florida State University.

== Professional career ==
=== St. Louis Cardinals ===
The St. Louis Cardinals selected Mercado in the second round, with the 58th overall selection, of the 2013 MLB draft. He signed with the Cardinals, receiving a $1.5 million signing bonus.

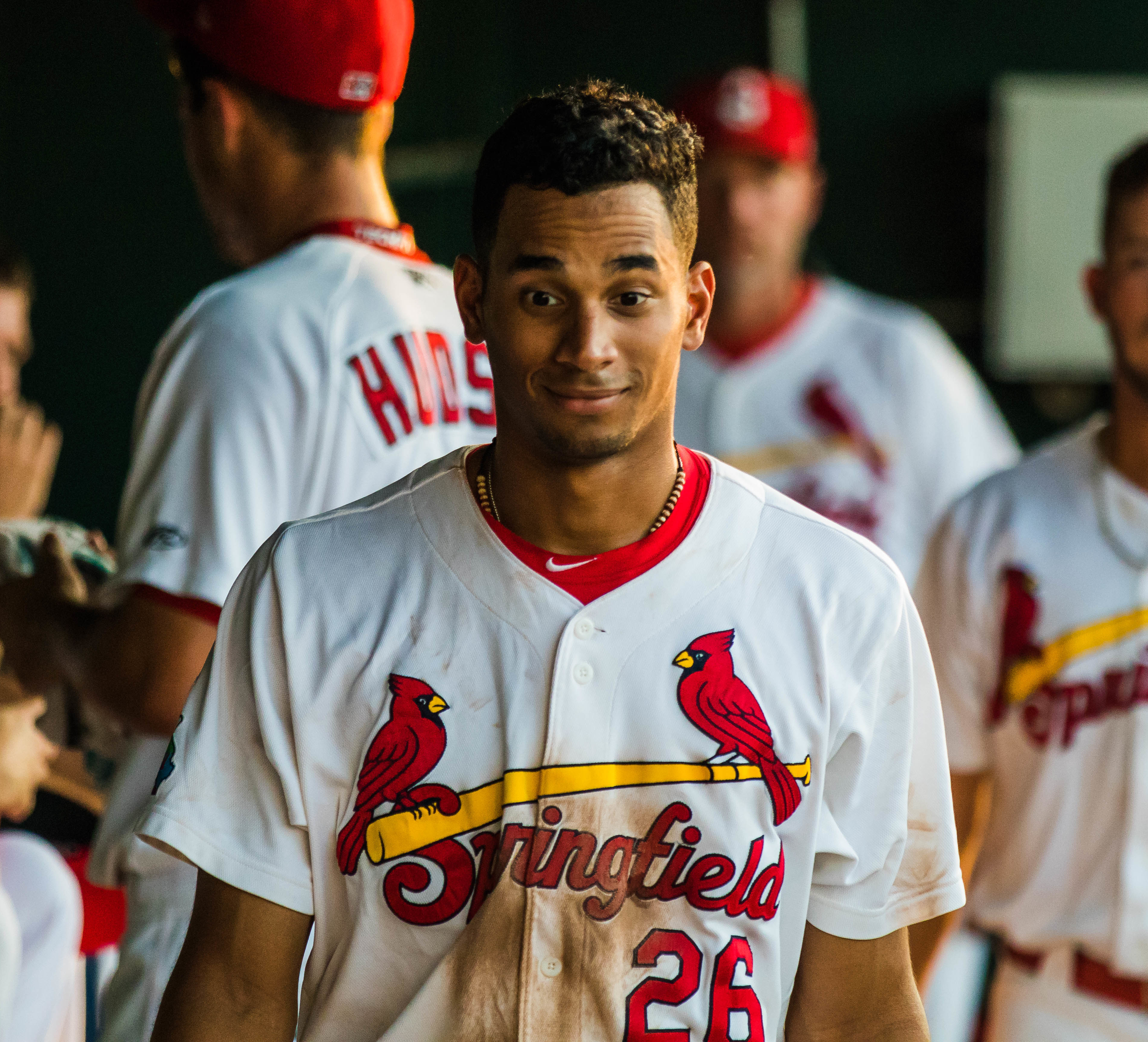
Mercado with the Springfield Cardinals in 2017

After signing, Mercado made his professional debut with the Gulf Coast Cardinals of the Rookie-level Gulf Coast League, batting .209 with one home run and 14 runs batted in (RBIs) in 42 games played. In 2014, he played for the Johnson City Cardinals of the Advanced Rookie-level Appalachian League, where he hit .224 with three home runs, 25 RBIs, and 26 stolen bases in 60 games, and in 2015, he played with the Peoria Chiefs of the Single–A Midwest League, where he compiled a .254 batting average with four home runs, 44 RBIs, and 50 stolen bases in 117 games. In 2016, he played for the Palm Beach Cardinals of the High–A Florida State League, where he switched from playing shortstop to outfielder. There, he batted .215 with 27 RBIs and 33 stolen bases in 125 games.

He spent the 2017 season with the Springfield Cardinals of the Double–A Texas League, where he slashed .287/.341/.428 with 13 home runs, 46 RBIs, and 38 stolen bases in 120 games. After the season, the Cardinals assigned Mercado to the Surprise Saguaros of the Arizona Fall League (AFL). Mercado appeared in a total of 22 games for the Saguaros, posting a .264 batting average with 11 RBIs and six stolen bases. The Cardinals added him to their 40-man roster after the AFL was over to protect him from being chosen in the Rule 5 Draft. Mercado began 2018 with the Memphis Redbirds of the Triple–A Pacific Coast League.

=== Cleveland Indians / Guardians ===
On July 31, 2018, the Cardinals traded Mercado to the Cleveland Indians in exchange for Conner Capel and Jhon Torres. He was assigned to the Columbus Clippers of the Triple–A International League and finished the season there. In 132 games between Memphis and Columbus, he slashed .278/.349/.390 with eight home runs, 47 RBIs, and 37 stolen bases. He began the 2019 season with Columbus.

The Indians promoted Mercado to the major leagues on May 14. He made his major league debut that day versus the Chicago White Sox. Overall with the 2020 Cleveland Indians, Mercado batted .128 with one home run and 6 RBIs in 36 games. On June 21, 2022, Mercado was designated for assignment by the Guardians.

=== Philadelphia Phillies ===
The Philadelphia Phillies claimed Mercado off of waivers on June 27, 2022. After appearing in only one game with the Phillies, Mercado was designated for assignment on July 1.

=== Cleveland Guardians (second stint) ===
The Cleveland Guardians claimed Mercado off of waivers on July 3, 2022. He was designated for assignment once again on July 11. After clearing waivers, Mercado was outrighted to Triple–A Columbus Clippers on July 14. He elected minor league free agency after the season on November 10.

=== St. Louis Cardinals (second stint) ===
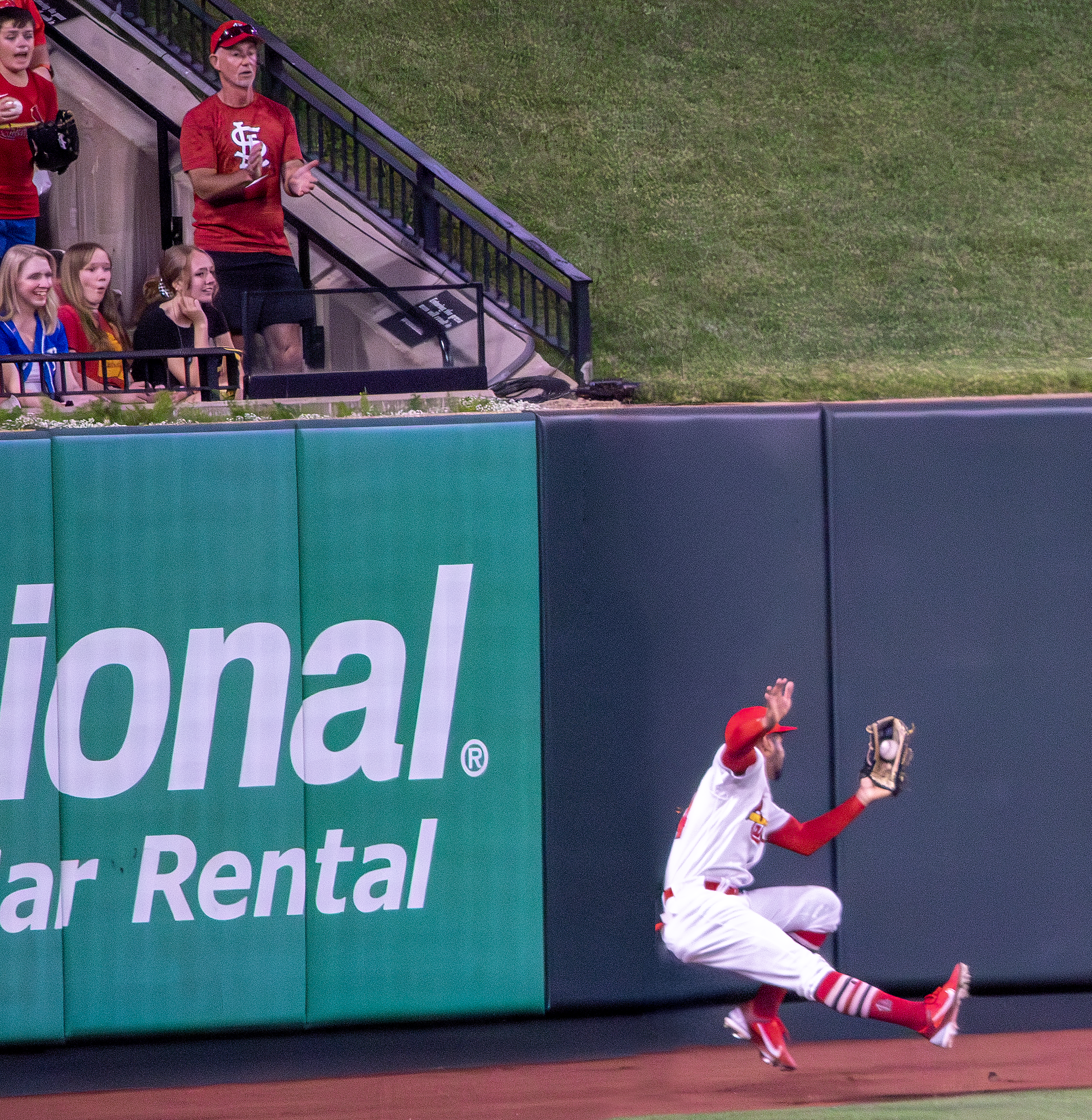
Óscar Mercado in St.Louis 2023.

Mercado signed a minor league contract to return to the St. Louis Cardinals organization on November 18, 2022. He began the 2023 season with the Triple-A Memphis Redbirds, playing in 34 games and hitting .278/.361/.421 with two home runs, 12 RBIs, and 15 stolen bases. On May 17, the Cardinals selected Mercado to the active roster. In 20 games for St. Louis, Mercado batted .290/.313/.387 with no home runs, five RBI, and two stolen bases. On July 3, Mercado was designated for assignment by the Cardinals. He cleared waivers and elected free agency in lieu of an outright assignment on July 5.

=== San Diego Padres ===
On July 7, 2023, Mercado signed a minor league contract with the San Diego Padres organization. In 31 games for the Triple–A El Paso Chihuahuas, he batted .339/.399/.669 with 10 home runs, 37 RBI, and 10 stolen bases. On August 22, Mercado opted out of his deal and became a free agent.

=== Los Angeles Dodgers ===
On August 26, 2023, Mercado signed a minor league contract with the Los Angeles Dodgers organization. In 15 games for the Oklahoma City Dodgers, he batted .259 with two homers and 35 RBI. Mercado elected free agency following the season on November 6.

=== San Diego Padres (second stint) ===
On December 28, 2023, Mercado signed a minor league contract with the San Diego Padres. In 78 games for the Triple–A El Paso Chihuahuas, he batted .226/.307/.425 with 11 home runs, 42 RBI, and 12 stolen bases. On August 1, 2024, Mercado opted out of his contract and became a free agent.

=== Detroit Tigers ===
On August 23, 2024, Mercado signed a minor league contract with the Detroit Tigers and was assigned to the Triple–A Toledo Mud Hens. In 15 games for Toledo, he batted .200/.315/.289 with one home run, eight RBI, and four stolen bases. Mercado elected free agency following the season on November 4.

=== Philadelphia Phillies (second stint) ===
On February 14, 2025, Mercado signed a minor league contract with the Philadelphia Phillies. In 92 appearances for the Triple-A Lehigh Valley IronPigs, he batted .252/.373/.385 with nine home runs, 54 RBI, and 35 stolen bases. On August 3, Mercado was released by the Phillies organization. Mercado re-signed with Philadelphia on a new minor league contract on August 13. He elected free agency following the season on November 6.

On February 14, 2026, Mercado signed a minor league contract with the Arizona Diamondbacks. He was released by the Diamondbacks on March 23. The following day, Mercado returned to the Phillies organization on a minor league contract. He made 24 appearances for Triple-A Lehigh Valley, slashing .141/.262/.183 with one home run, six RBI, and three stolen bases. On May 10, Mercado was released by Philadelphia.

=== Caliente de Durango ===
On May 25, 2026, Mercado signed with the Caliente de Durango of the Mexican League. In 15 appearances for Durango, Mercado batted .277/.469/.426 with two home runs and two RBI.

=== Sultanes de Monterrey ===
On June 13, 2026, Mercado was traded to the Sultanes de Monterrey of the Mexican League. In three appearances for the Sultanes, he went 0-for-11 at the plate with two strikeouts. On June 24, Mercado was waived by Monterrey.

=== El Águila de Veracruz ===
On July 1, 2026, Mercado signed with El Águila de Veracruz of the Mexican League. In four games, he went 1-for-9 at the plate with two walks and two strikeouts. On July 10, Mercado was released by Veracruz.

== International career ==
Mercado represents the Colombian national team in international competition. At the 2017 World Baseball Classic, the 22-year old Mercado went hitless in his sole at-bat, but nevertheless scored a run as a pinch runner in a 4-1 victory over Canada. At the 2023 World Baseball Classic, Mercado hit .308/.400/.385, with a double and two walks.

== Personal life ==
Mercado became an American citizen in 2018.
