= Mike Freeman (baseball) =

American baseball player (born 1987)

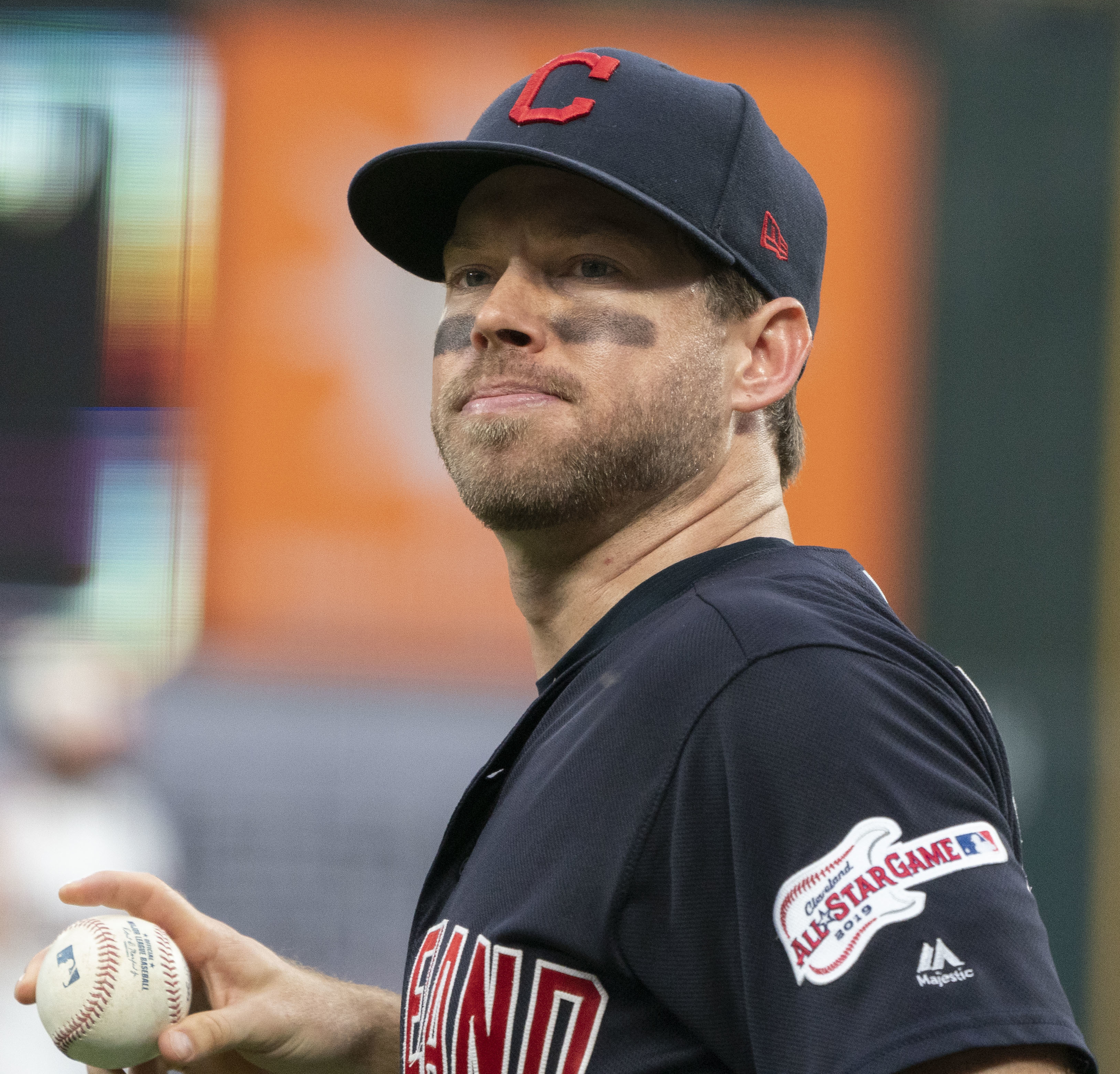
- Freeman with the Cleveland Indians in 2019
- Utility player
- Born: August 4, 1987 (age 38); Orlando, Florida, U.S.
- Batted: Left Threw: Right

MLB debut
- July 17, 2016, for the Arizona Diamondbacks

Last MLB appearance
- August 4, 2021, for the Cincinnati Reds

MLB statistics
- Batting average: .225
- Home runs: 5
- Runs batted in: 32
- Stats at Baseball Reference

Teams
- Arizona Diamondbacks (2016); Seattle Mariners (2016–2017); Los Angeles Dodgers (2017); Chicago Cubs (2017–2018); Cleveland Indians (2019–2020); Cincinnati Reds (2021)

Michael Barrett Freeman (born August 4, 1987) is an American former professional baseball utility player. He played in Major League Baseball (MLB) for the Arizona Diamondbacks, Seattle Mariners, Los Angeles Dodgers, Chicago Cubs, Cleveland Indians, and Cincinnati Reds.

== Playing career ==
=== Amateur ===
Freeman attended Edgewater High School in Orlando, Florida. Out of high school he was drafted by the San Diego Padres in the 41st round of the 2006 Major League Baseball draft. He did not sign and played college baseball at Clemson University. In 2008, he played collegiate summer baseball with the Brewster Whitecaps of the Cape Cod Baseball League.

=== Arizona Diamondbacks ===
After his junior year he was drafted by the Arizona Diamondbacks in the 36th round of the 2009 MLB draft but did not sign and returned to Clemson. He was then drafted by the Diamondbacks in the 11th round of the 2010 Major League Baseball draft and signed. Freeman made his professional debut with the Low-A Yakima Bears, hitting .333 with one home run and 23 RBI in 53 games. He made 70 appearances for the Single-A South Bend Silver Hawks in 2011, slashing .261/.330/.335 with 27 RBI and 16 stolen bases.

Freeman made 135 appearances for the High-A Visalia Rawhide during the 2012 season, batting .309/.377/.389 with three home runs, 59 RBI, and 30 stolen bases. In 2013, he played in 131 games for the Double-A Mobile BayBears, slashing .247/.345/.297 with one home run, 40 RBI, and 29 stolen bases.

Freeman split the 2014 campaign between Mobile and the Triple-A Reno Aces. In 123 appearances for the two affiliates, he hit a combined .263/.330/.399 with six home runs, 41 RBI, and 13 stolen bases bases. In 2015, Freeman played in 116 games for Reno and the Low-A Hillsboro Hops, batting a cumulative .314/.369/.419 with three home runs, 41 RBI, and 10 stolen bases.

Freeman began the 2016 season with Triple-A Reno. On July 17, 2016, Freeman was selected to the 40-man roster and promoted to the major leagues for the first time. He made eight appearances for the Diamondbacks, but recorded no hits and two walks across 11 plate appearances. On July 30, Freeman was designated for assignment by Arizona.

=== Seattle Mariners ===
Freeman was claimed off waivers by the Seattle Mariners on August 1, 2016. He made 13 appearances down the stretch for Seattle, going 5-for-13 (.385) with one RBI. Freeman was designated for assignment by the Mariners on March 1, 2017.

=== Los Angeles Dodgers ===
On May 26, 2017, Freeman was claimed off waivers by the Los Angeles Dodgers. He made 41 appearances for the Triple-A Oklahoma City Dodgers, batting .306/.384/.372 with 16 RBI and five stolen bases. Freeman was designated for assignment by Los Angeles following the acquisition of Yu Darvish.

=== Chicago Cubs ===
On August 6, 2017, Freeman signed a minor league contract with the Chicago Cubs. On September 1, the Cubs selected Freeman's contract, adding him to their active roster. He made 15 appearances for Chicago, going 4-for-25 (.160) with two walks. Freeman ultimately was not included on the team's playoff roster following the season. On October 26, Freeman was designated for assignment by Chicago following the acquisition of Jacob Hannemann. He elected minor league free agency on November 6.

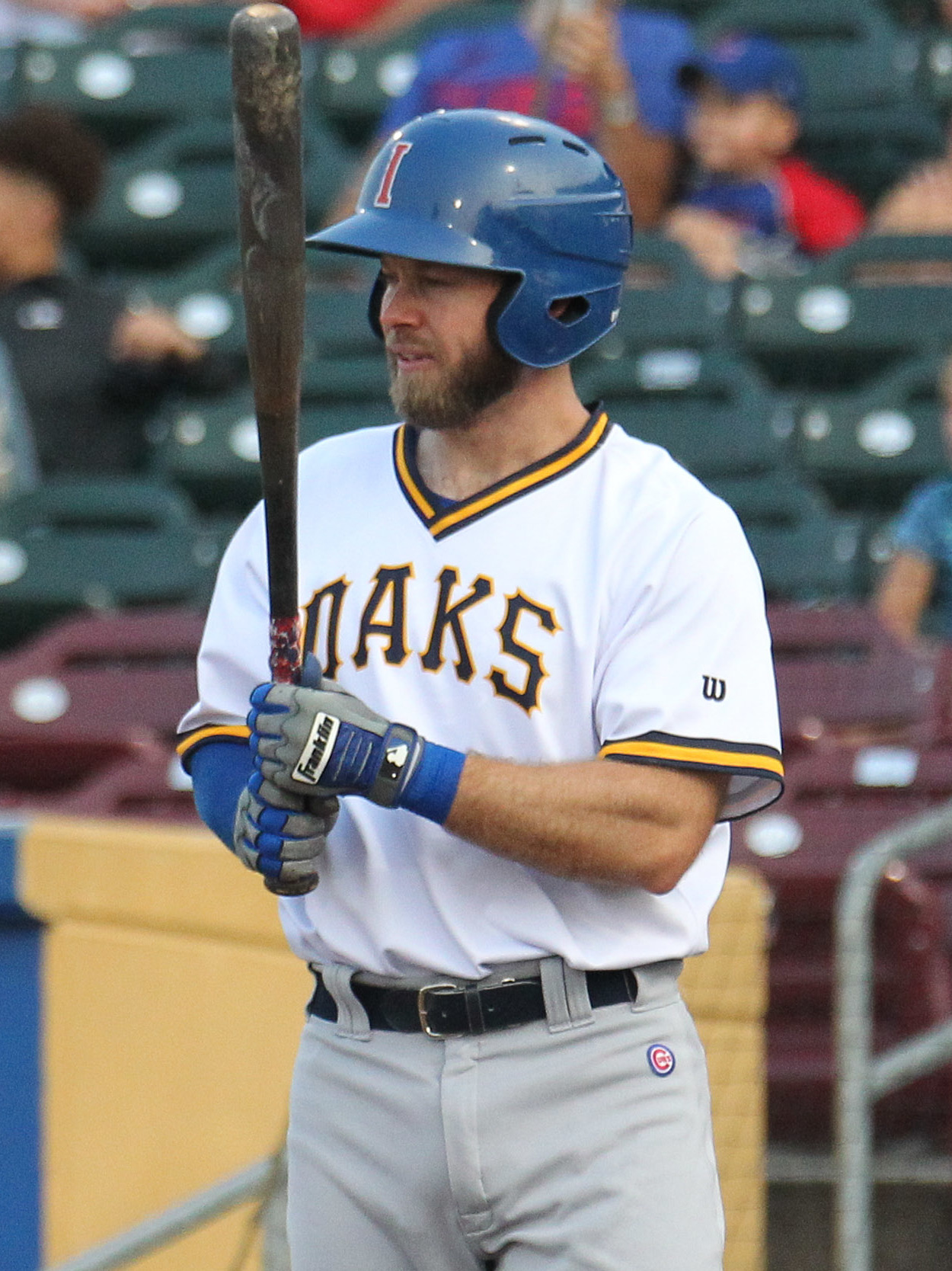
Freeman with the Iowa Cubs in 2018

On January 25, 2018, Freeman re-signed with the Cubs on a minor league contract and received an invitation to spring training. He spent the majority of the year with the Triple-A Iowa Cubs, slashing .274/.330/.396 with six home runs and 38 RBI, and six stolen bases across 78 games. On September 22, following Addison Russell's placement on administrative leave, Freeman was selected to Chicago’s active roster. He made only one appearance for the team, going 0-for-1 in a 7–6 victory over the Pittsburgh Pirates on September 26. On November 2, Freeman was removed from 40-man roster and sent outright to Iowa. He elected minor league free agency four days later.

=== Cleveland Indians ===
On November 20, 2018, Freeman signed a minor league contract with the Cleveland Indians that included an invitation to spring training. On April 16, 2019, the Indians selected Freeman's contract, adding him to their active roster. He made 75 appearances for Cleveland, batting .277/.362/.390 with four home runs, 24 RBI, and one stolen base. Freeman was designated for assignment by the Indians on December 15, following the acquisition of Emmanuel Clase. He cleared waivers and was sent outright to the Triple-A Columbus Clippers on December 19.

On July 22, 2020, it was announced that Freeman had made Cleveland's Opening Day roster. He made 24 appearances for the Indians, hitting .237/.302/.316 with three RBI and three walks. On October 30, Freeman was outrighted off of the Indians' 40-man roster; he subsequently elected free agency.

On February 4, 2021, Freeman re-signed with the Indians organization on a minor league contract.

=== Cincinnati Reds ===
On March 12, 2021, Freeman was traded to the Cincinnati Reds in exchange for cash. However, he did not make Cincinnati's Opening Day roster. On June 1, the Reds selected Freeman's contract, adding him to their active roster. He made 37 appearances for Cincinnati, slashing .186/.262/.186 with three RBI and one stolen base. On August 15, Freeman was designated for assignment by the Reds. On August 17, Freeman was sent outright to the Triple-A Louisville Bats after clearing waivers. Freeman elected free agency on October 12.

== Coaching career ==
On January 25, 2023, Freeman was hired by the Seattle Mariners organization to serve as the manager for the Arkansas Travelers, Seattle's Double-A affiliate.
