= Adam Cimber =

American baseball player (born 1990)

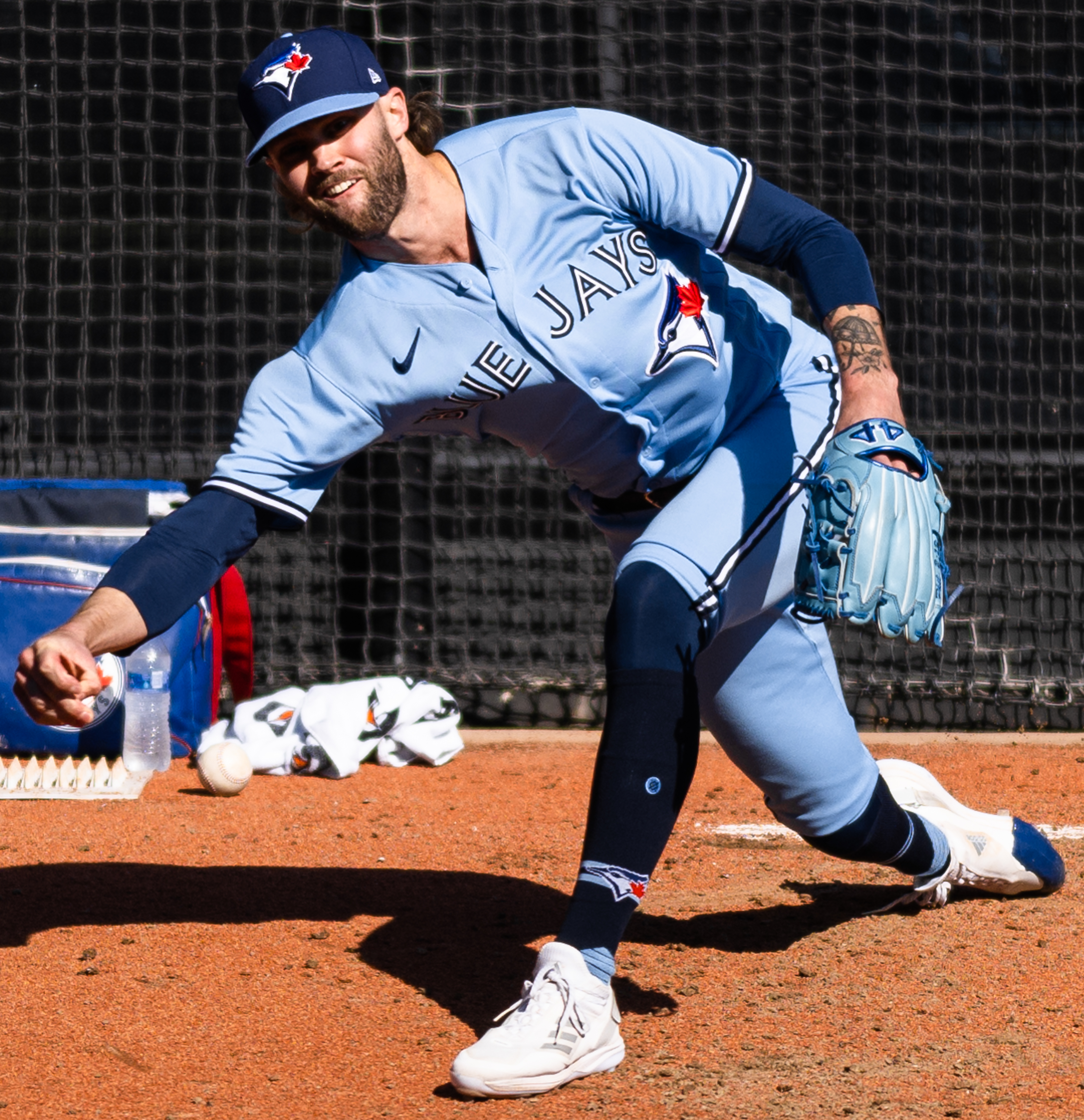
- Cimber with the Toronto Blue Jays in 2022
- Pitcher
- Born: August 15, 1990 (age 35); Portland, Oregon, U.S.
- Batted: Right Threw: Right

MLB debut
- March 29, 2018, for the San Diego Padres

Last MLB appearance
- June 14, 2024, for the Los Angeles Angels

MLB statistics
- Win–loss record: 25–24
- Earned run average: 3.75
- Strikeouts: 244
- Stats at Baseball Reference

Teams
- San Diego Padres (2018); Cleveland Indians (2018–2020); Miami Marlins (2021); Toronto Blue Jays (2021–2023); Los Angeles Angels (2024)

Adam Christian Cimber (born August 15, 1990) is an American former professional baseball pitcher. He played in Major League Baseball (MLB) for the San Diego Padres, Cleveland Indians, Miami Marlins, Toronto Blue Jays, and Los Angeles Angels. During his time in the major leagues, Cimber was one of only a few pitchers with a submarine delivery.

== Amateur career ==
Cimber attended Puyallup High School in Puyallup, Washington. In high school, Cimber said he was very "small and skinny." His father suggested that to make the team, he would have to do something differently. He was intrigued by the submarine delivery of Brad Ziegler of the Oakland A's and began experimenting in his backyard.

After high school, he enrolled at the University of Washington where he played college baseball from 2010 to 2012, compiling a 9–8 win–loss record and 4.15 earned run average (ERA) in 73 appearances. He then transferred to the University of San Francisco where he spent the 2013 season, posting a 6–3 record and 3.74 ERA in 57 innings pitched.

== Professional career ==
=== San Diego Padres ===
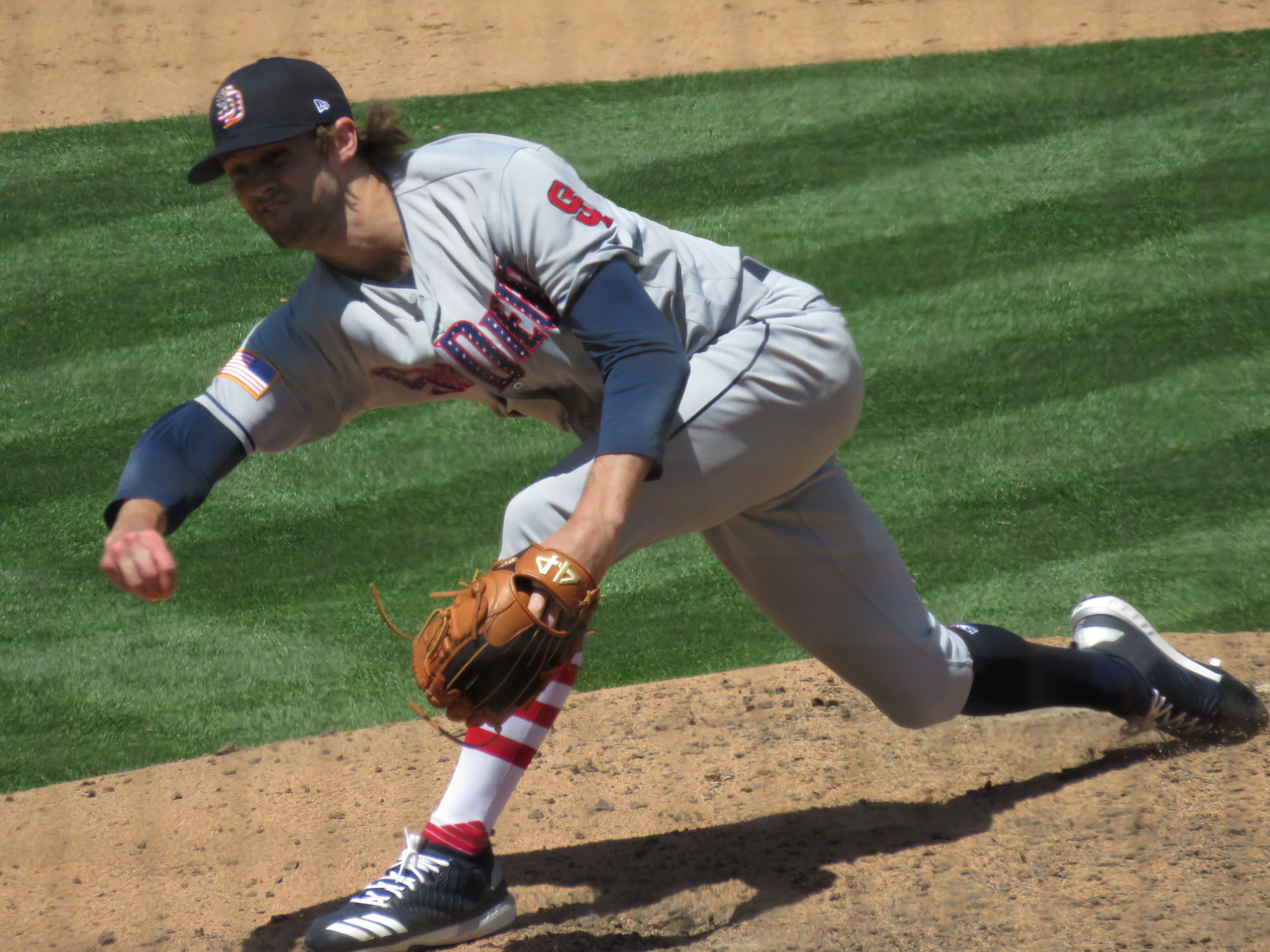
Cimber with the Padres on July 4, 2018

The San Diego Padres selected Cimber in the ninth round of the 2013 Major League Baseball draft. He signed and spent 2013 with the Eugene Emeralds where he was 3–1 with a 2.56 ERA in 28 relief appearances. In 2014, he played for the Lake Elsinore Storm where he pitched to a 5–3 record, 2.90 ERA, and 1.15 walks plus hits per inning pitched (WHIP) in 52 games, and in 2015, he pitched for both the San Antonio Missions and El Paso Chihuahuas where he posted a combined 4–2 record and 3.05 ERA in 46 total games between both teams. Cimber spent 2016 with both San Antonio and El Paso where he was 3–3 with a 3.77 ERA in 46 games and 2017 with the same two teams, going 5–2 with a 2.90 ERA with an 0.90 WHIP in 80 2/3 innings pitched.

Cimber made the San Diego's Opening Day roster in 2018. He made his major league debut on March 29.

=== Cleveland Indians ===
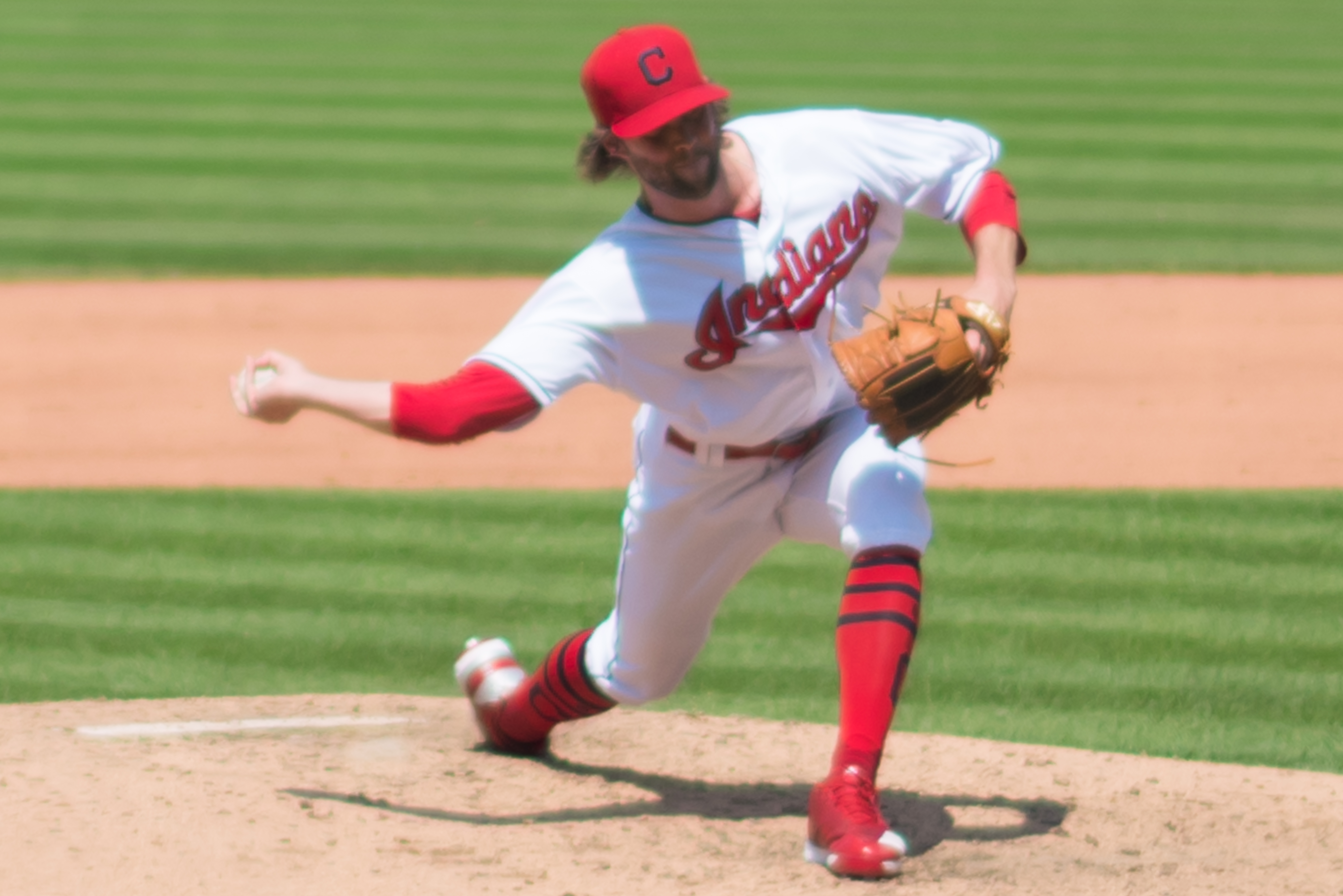
Cimber with the Indians on August 5, 2018

On July 19, 2018, the Padres traded Cimber and Brad Hand to the Cleveland Indians for Francisco Mejía. He finished his 2018 season with a 3–8 record and a 3.42 ERA in seventy relief appearances, and shared the major league lead in intentional walks, with nine, while he had a total of only 17 walks.

With the 2020 Cleveland Indians, Cimber appeared in 14 games, compiling a 0–1 record with 3.97 ERA and five strikeouts in 11 1/3 innings pitched. Cimber was designated for assignment on November 25, 2020.

=== Miami Marlins ===
On November 30, 2020, the Indians traded Cimber to the Miami Marlins in exchange for cash considerations. In 33 appearances with Miami in 2021, Cimber pitched to a 2.88 ERA with 21 strikeouts in 34 1/3 innings of work.

=== Toronto Blue Jays ===
On June 29, 2021, Cimber was traded to the Toronto Blue Jays alongside Corey Dickerson in exchange for Joe Panik and minor league pitcher Andrew McInvale. Cimber made 39 appearances in 2021 for the Blue Jays, going 2–2 with a 1.69 ERA and 30 strikeouts.

On March 22, 2022, Cimber signed a $1.575 million contract with the Blue Jays, avoiding salary arbitration. On the year, he made a league-leading 77 appearances, and posted a 10–6 record and 2.80 ERA with 58 strikeouts and 4 saves in 70 2/3 innings of work.

In 2023, Cimber began the year out of Toronto's bullpen, but uncharacteristically struggled to a 7.40 ERA in 20 2/3 innings across 22 games. On June 24, 2023, he was placed on the injured list with a right shoulder impingement. He was transferred to the 60-day injured list on July 19. He was non-tendered and became a free agent on November 17.

=== Los Angeles Angels ===
On December 13, 2023, Cimber signed a one-year, $1.65 million contract with the Los Angeles Angels. He made 28 appearances for the Angels in 2024, struggling to a 7.03 ERA with 19 strikeouts across 24 1/3 innings pitched. Cimber was designated for assignment by the Angels on July 22, 2024. He was released by the organization the next day. On August 4, Cimber re-signed with the Angels organization on a minor league contract. In 11 appearances for the Triple-A Salt Lake Bees, he struggled to an 0–1 record and 7.04 ERA with 20 strikeouts across 15 1/3 innings pitched. Cimber elected free agency following the season on November 4.

== Personal life ==
Cimber grew up a Seattle Mariners fan.

Cimber and his wife, Lauren, married in November 2018.
