= Adam Plutko =

American baseball player (born 1991)

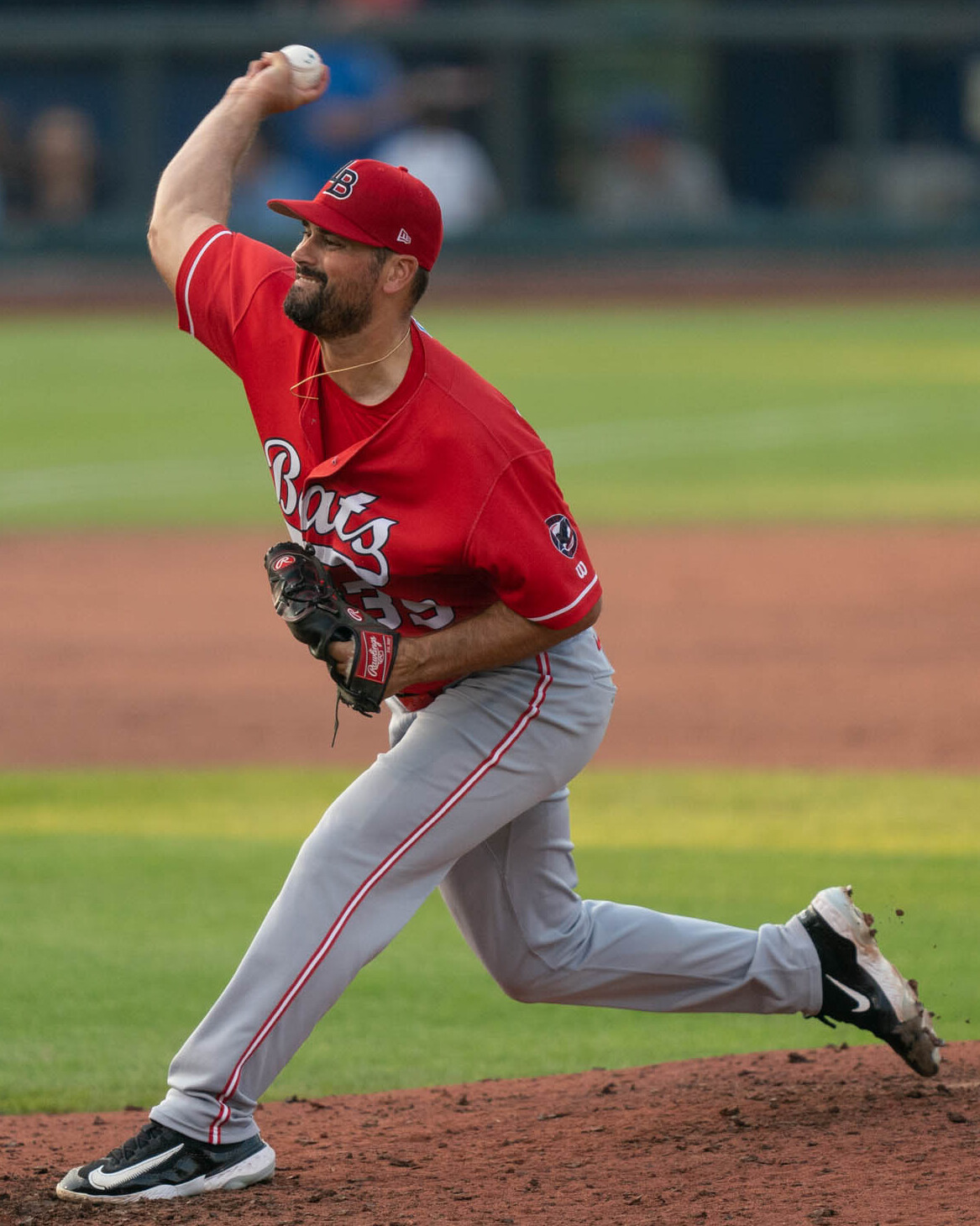
- Plutko with the Louisville Bats in 2025
- Pitcher
- Born: October 3, 1991 (age 35); Upland, California, U.S.
- Batted: Right Threw: Right

Professional debut
- MLB: September 24, 2016, for the Cleveland Indians
- KBO: April 2, 2022, for the LG Twins

Last appearance
- MLB: August 14, 2021, for the Baltimore Orioles
- KBO: August 26, 2023, for the LG Twins

MLB statistics
- Win–loss record: 14–14
- Earned run average: 5.39
- Strikeouts: 200

KBO statistics
- Win–loss record: 26-8
- Earned run average: 2.40
- Strikeouts: 250
- Stats at Baseball Reference

Teams
- Cleveland Indians (2016, 2018–2020); Baltimore Orioles (2021); LG Twins (2022–2023)

Career highlights and awards
- KBO: Korean Series champion (2023)
Medals
Men's baseball
Representing the United States
Haarlem Baseball Week
Bronze medal – third place	2012	Team

Adam Gregory Plutko (/ˈplʌtkoʊ/ PLUHT-koh; born October 3, 1991) is an American former professional baseball pitcher. He played in Major League Baseball (MLB) for the Cleveland Indians and Baltimore Orioles, and in the KBO League for the LG Twins. He played college baseball for the UCLA Bruins.

== Amateur career ==
Plutko attended Glendora High School in Glendora, California, and then enrolled at the University of California, Los Angeles (UCLA). Though he was selected by the Houston Astros in the sixth round of the 2010 Major League Baseball draft, he opted not to sign with the Astros.

At UCLA, Plutko was a member of the Bruins baseball team. He was teammates with future MLB All-Stars Gerrit Cole and Trevor Bauer. In 2013, Plutko led the Bruins to their first NCAA baseball championship, beating Mississippi State in the 2013 College World Series. During the World Series, he recorded wins over LSU in the opening round of the World Series and over against Mississippi State in Game 1 of the Championship Series. He was named the College World Series Most Outstanding Player.

== Professional career ==
=== Cleveland Indians ===
The Cleveland Indians selected Plutko in the 11th round of the 2013 Major League Baseball draft. He signed with the Indians but did not pitch for their Minor League Baseball affiliates that year due to a stress fracture in his shoulder. Plutko made his professional debut in 2014 with the Lake County Captains of the Class A Midwest League. In May, the Indians promoted Plutko to the Carolina Mudcats of the Class A-Advanced Carolina League. In 28 games started between the two teams he compiled a 7–10 record and 4.03 ERA. He began the 2015 season with the Lynchburg Hillcats of the Carolina League, and was promoted to the Akron RubberDucks of the Class AA Eastern League in May. Plutko posted a 13–7 record, a 2.39 ERA, and a 0.93 WHIP in 27 starts between the two clubs.

The Indians invited Plutko to spring training in 2016. He began the 2016 season with Akron and was promoted to the Columbus Clippers of the Triple-A International League on June 16.

On September 20, 2016, the Indians purchased Plutko's contract from the Clippers and added him to their active roster. In 28 starts for Akron and Columbus prior to his call up, he pitched to a 9–8 record and 3.73 ERA. He made his major league debut on September 24 as a relief pitcher.

Plutko spent all of 2017 with Columbus, going 7–12 with a 5.90 ERA in 24 games (22 starts). He began 2018 with Columbus, and was recalled on May 3 for one game. He was optioned back to Columbus the day after. He was recalled once again on May 23 to take over as the fifth starter for Cleveland after Josh Tomlin was moved to the bullpen. He was sent back to Columbus, and threw a no-hitter on June 2. He finished with a record of 4–5 in 17 games (12 starts). The following season, Plutko was 7–5 in 109 1/3 innings.

Before the 2020 season, Plutko was moved to the bullpen. He got a spot start in the second game of a doubleheader against the White Sox, where he went six innings and struck out four while allowing two runs.

With the 2020 Cleveland Indians, Plutko appeared in 10 games, compiling a 2–2 record with 4.88 ERA and 15 strikeouts in 27 2/3 innings pitched.

=== Baltimore Orioles ===
On March 27, 2021, Plutko was traded to the Baltimore Orioles for cash. In 38 games for Baltimore, Plutko posted a 6.71 ERA with 44 strikeouts. On August 15, Plutko was designated for assignment by the Orioles. On August 19, Plutko cleared waivers and was assigned outright to the Triple-A Norfolk Tides. On October 4, Plutko elected free agency.

=== LG Twins ===
On December 9, 2021, Plutko signed a one-year contract worth $500,000 with an additional $300,000 in incentives with the LG Twins of the KBO League. He had a 15–5 record and a 2.39 ERA for the Twins. On December 2, 2022, Plutko re-signed with the Twins on a one-year contract for the 2023 season worth $1.4 million. In 21 starts for the team, he logged an 11–3 record and 2.41 ERA with 101 strikeouts across 123 1/3 innings pitched. On October 27, 2023, Plutko left South Korea following a left hip injury. He became a free agent following the season and announced he was hoping to return to Major League Baseball.

=== Minnesota Twins ===
On May 3, 2024, Plutko signed a minor league contract with the Minnesota Twins. In 14 appearances split between the rookie-level Florida Complex League Twins and Triple-A St. Paul Saints, he posted a cumulative 6–2 record and 4.28 ERA with 50 strikeouts over 61 innings of work. Plutko elected free agency following the season on November 4.

=== Cincinnati Reds ===
On April 9, 2025, Plutko signed a minor league contract with the Cincinnati Reds. He began the season with the Triple-A Louisville Bats; in 21 appearances (20 starts) for the team, he logged an 8-7 record and 4.74 ERA with 61 strikeouts across 98 2/3 innings pitched. Plutko elected free agency following the season on November 6.

On May 5, 2026, Plutko announced his retirement from professional baseball.
