= Cam Hill =

American baseball player (born 1994)

Free agent
- Pitcher
- Born: May 24, 1994 (age 32); Oklahoma City, Oklahoma, U.S.
- Bats: Right Throws: Right

MLB debut
- July 26, 2020, for the Cleveland Indians

MLB statistics (through 2020 season)
- Win–loss record: 2–0
- Earned run average: 4.91
- Strikeouts: 16
- Stats at Baseball Reference

Teams
- Cleveland Indians (2020)

Cameron Price Hill (born May 24, 1994) is an American professional baseball pitcher who is a free agent. He played in Major League Baseball (MLB) for the Cleveland Indians.

== Playing career ==
=== Cleveland Indians ===
Hill attended El Reno High School in El Reno, Oklahoma and played college baseball at Redlands Community College. He was drafted by the Cleveland Indians in the 17th round of the 2014 Major League Baseball draft. Hill made his professional debut with the Low-A Mahoning Valley Scrappers, posting a 1.76 ERA in 14 games.

In 2015, Hill played for the Single-A Lake County Captains, and pitched to a 5-4 record and 1.53 ERA in 42 appearances. He split the 2016 season between the High-A Lynchburg Hillcats, Double-A Akron RubberDucks, and Triple-A Columbus Clippers, accumulating a 2.34 ERA in 42 appearances between the three teams. In 2017, Hill split the year between Columbus and Akron, posting a 3.08 ERA with 50 strikeouts in 43 games. The following season, Hill returned to Columbus, where he spent the season, recording a 6.59 ERA in 16 games. For the 2019 season, Hill spent the majority of the year in Columbus, also playing in 7 games for Lake County and Mahoning Valley, and registered a cumulative 4-2 record and 3.58 ERA with 48 strikeouts in 32.2 innings of work.

Hill made the Indians' Opening Day roster in 2020, with the Indians selecting his contract on July 23, 2020. He made his major league debut on July 26, 2020. With the 2020 Cleveland Indians, Hill appeared in 18 games, compiling a 2-0 record with 4.91 ERA and 16 strikeouts in 18.1 innings pitched.

On November 30, 2020, Hill was involved in a car crash and suffered a wrist injury that required surgery. On March 27, 2021, Hill was placed on the 60-day injured list. Hill was activated off of the injured list on July 25 and optioned to the Triple-A Columbus Clippers.

Hill was outrighted off the Indians' 40-man roster on November 5, 2021, and subsequently elected free agency.

=== Chicago White Sox ===
On November 28, 2021, Hill signed a minor league contract with the Chicago White Sox. Hill was released by the White Sox organization on March 8, 2022.

=== Kansas City Monarchs ===
On July 15, 2022, Hill signed with the Kansas City Monarchs of the American Association of Professional Baseball. Hill made three appearances for the Monarchs, logging a 6.00 ERA with one win and four strikeouts in three innings pitched. He was released by the club on July 27.

=== Staten Island FerryHawks ===
On June 12, 2024, Hill came out of retirement to sign with the Staten Island FerryHawks of the Atlantic League of Professional Baseball. In 6 starts for Staten Island, he compiled an 0–3 record and 6.91 ERA with 19 strikeouts across 27 1/3 innings pitched. Hill retired once more on July 15.

=== Tampa Bay Rays ===
On January 8, 2026, Hill came out of retirement a second time and signed a minor league contract with the Tampa Bay Rays. In 45 games with Triple-A Durham Bulls he threw 57.2 innings going 4-2 with a 3.75 ERA with 46 strikeouts and 6 saves. He elected free agency on November 2.

== Coaching career ==
On March 26, 2024, Hill was hired to serve as the pitching coach for the University of Illinois Urbana-Champaign.

On January 30, 2025, the Cleveland Guardians hired Hill to serve as the pitching coach for their rookie-level affiliate, the Arizona Complex League Guardians.
