= 2021 Cleveland Indians season =

Major League Baseball team season; final one with the "indians" name

2021 Cleveland Indians
- League: American League
- Division: Central
- Ballpark: Progressive Field
- City: Cleveland, Ohio
- Record: 80–82 (.494)
- Divisional place: 2nd
- Owners: Larry Dolan
- President of baseball operations: Chris Antonetti
- General managers: Mike Chernoff
- Managers: Terry Francona
- Television: Bally Sports Great Lakes · WKYC (Matt Underwood, Rick Manning)
- Radio: WTAM · WMMS; Cleveland Indians Radio Network (Tom Hamilton, Jim Rosenhaus, Rick Manning)

The 2021 Cleveland Indians season was the 121st season for the franchise. It was the ninth season under the leadership of manager Terry Francona and sixth under general manager Mike Chernoff. The Indians played their home games at Progressive Field in Cleveland, Ohio.

This was the team's final season under the name Indians. Following the season, the team became known as the Cleveland Guardians after decades of controversy surrounding the "Indians" name.

The Indians made MLB history by becoming the first team to be no-hit three times in a single season. Those three no-hitters came off of Carlos Rodón of the Chicago White Sox on April 14, Wade Miley of the Cincinnati Reds on May 7, and Corbin Burnes and Josh Hader of the Milwaukee Brewers on September 11. By coincidence, Zach Plesac was their starting pitcher in all three no-hitters. In addition, they were held hitless in a seven-inning doubleheader game against the Tampa Bay Rays.

== Season standings ==
=== American League Central ===
AL Central
Team	W	L	Pct.	GB	Home	Road
Chicago White Sox	93	69	.574	—	53‍–‍28	40‍–‍41
Cleveland Indians	80	82	.494	13	40‍–‍41	40‍–‍41
Detroit Tigers	77	85	.475	16	42‍–‍39	35‍–‍46
Kansas City Royals	74	88	.457	19	39‍–‍42	35‍–‍46
Minnesota Twins	73	89	.451	20	38‍–‍43	35‍–‍46

=== American League Wild Card ===
Division leaders
Team	W	L	Pct.
Tampa Bay Rays	100	62	.617
Houston Astros	95	67	.586
Chicago White Sox	93	69	.574

Wild Card teams (Top 2 teams qualify for postseason)
Team	W	L	Pct.	GB
Boston Red Sox	92	70	.568	—
New York Yankees	92	70	.568	—
Toronto Blue Jays	91	71	.562	1
Seattle Mariners	90	72	.556	2
Oakland Athletics	86	76	.531	6
Cleveland Indians	80	82	.494	12
Los Angeles Angels	77	85	.475	15
Detroit Tigers	77	85	.475	15
Kansas City Royals	74	88	.457	18
Minnesota Twins	73	89	.451	19
Texas Rangers	60	102	.370	32
Baltimore Orioles	52	110	.321	40

=== Record against opponents ===
2021 American League record Source: MLB Standings Grid – 2021
Team	BAL	BOS	CWS	CLE	DET	HOU	KC	LAA	MIN	NYY	OAK	SEA	TB	TEX	TOR	NL
Baltimore	—	6–13	0–7	2–5	2–5	3–3	4–3	2–4	2–4	8–11	3–3	3–4	1–18	4–3	5–14	7–13
Boston	13–6	—	3–4	4–2	3–3	2–5	5–2	3–3	5–2	10–9	3–3	4–3	8–11	3–4	10–9	16–4
Chicago	7–0	4–3	—	10–9	12–7	2–5	9–10	2–5	13–6	1–5	4–3	3–3	3–3	5–1	4–3	14–6
Cleveland	5–2	2–4	9–10	—	12–7	1–6	14–5	5–1	8–11	3–4	2–4	3–4	1–6	4–2	2–5	9–11
Detroit	5–2	3–3	7–12	7–12	—	5–2	8–11	1–6	8–11	3–3	1–6	5–1	4–3	6–1	3–3	11–9
Houston	3–3	5–2	5–2	6–1	2–5	—	3–4	13–6	3–4	2–4	11–8	11–8	4–2	14–5	4–2	9–11
Kansas City	3–4	2–5	10–9	5–14	11–8	4–3	—	2–4	10–9	2–4	2–5	4–3	2–4	2–4	3–4	12–8
Los Angeles	4–2	3–3	5–2	1–5	6–1	6–13	4–2	—	5–2	4–3	4–15	8–11	1–6	11–8	4–3	11–9
Minnesota	4–2	2–5	6–13	11–8	11–8	4–3	9–10	2–5	—	1–6	1–5	2–4	3–3	4–3	3–4	10–10
New York	11–8	9–10	5–1	4–3	3–3	4–2	4–2	3–4	6–1	—	4–3	5–2	8–11	6–1	8–11	12–8
Oakland	3–3	3–3	3–4	4–2	6–1	8–11	5–2	15–4	5–1	3–4	—	4–15	4–3	10–9	2–5	11–9
Seattle	4–3	3–4	3–3	4–3	1–5	8–11	3–4	11–8	4–2	2–5	15–4	—	6–1	13–6	4–2	9–11
Tampa Bay	18–1	11–8	3–3	6–1	3–4	2–4	4–2	6–1	3–3	11–8	3–4	1–6	—	3–4	11–8	15–5
Texas	3–4	4–3	1–5	2–4	1–6	5–14	4–2	8–11	3–4	1–6	9–10	6–13	4–3	—	2–4	7–13
Toronto	14–5	9–10	3–4	5–2	3–3	2–4	4–3	3–4	4–3	11–8	5–2	2–4	8–11	4–2	—	14–6

Updated with the results of all games through October 3, 2021.

== Game log ==
2021 Game Log: 80–82 (Home: 40–41; Away: 40–41)
April: 12–12 (Home: 7–6; Away: 5–6)

#	Date	Opponent	Score	Win	Loss	Save	Attendance	Record	StreakUse background:#fbb for loss, #bfb for win, #bbb for cancelled/postponed -->
1	April 1	@ Tigers	2–3	Boyd (1–0)	**Bieber** (0–1)	Soto (1)	8,000	0–1	L1
2	April 3	@ Tigers	2–5	Teherán (1–0)	**Plesac** (0–1)	Garcia (1)	8,000	0–2	L2
3	April 4	@ Tigers	9–3	**Civale** (1–0)	Norris (0–1)		8,000	1–2	W1
4	April 5	Royals	0–3	Duffy (1–0)	**Allen** (0–1)	Hahn (1)	8,914	1–3	L1
5	April 7	Royals	4–2	**Clase** (1–0)	Holland (0–1)	**Wittgren** (1)	5,908	2–3	W1
6	April 9	Tigers	4–1	**Plesac** (1–1)	Holland (0–1)	**Clase** (1)	7,775	3–3	W2
7	April 10	Tigers	11–3	**Civale** (2–0)	Skubal (0–1)		7,570	4–3	W3
8	April 11	Tigers	5–2	**Allen** (1–1)	Urena (0–2)	**Clase** (2)	6,859	5–3	W4
9	April 12	@ White Sox	3–4	Heuer (1–0)	**Clase** (1–1)		7,393	5–4	L1
10	April 13	@ White Sox	2–0 (10)	**Bieber** (1–1)	Crochet (0–2)	**Karinchak** (1)	7,102	6–4	W1
11	April 14	@ White Sox	0–8	Rodón (2–0)	**Plesac** (1–2)		7,148	6–5	L1
12	April 15	@ White Sox	4–2	**Civale** (3–0)	Lynn (1–1)	**Clase** (3)	7,049	7–5	W1
13	April 16	@ Reds	3–10	Hoffman (2–1)	**Allen** (1–2)		12,497	7–6	L1
14	April 17	@ Reds	2–3 (10)	Doolittle (2–0)	**Pérez** (0–1)		12,598	7–7	L2
15	April 18	@ Reds	6–3	**Bieber** (2–1)	Miley (2–1)	**Clase** (4)	12,551	8–7	W1
16	April 20	White Sox	5–8	Rodón (3–0)	**Plesac** (1–3)		4,176	8–8	L1
—	April 21	White Sox	Postponed (rain) make-up date May 31						
17	April 22	Yankees	3–6	Germán (1–2)	**Wittgren** (0–1)	Chapman (3)	6,380	8–9	L2
18	April 23	Yankees	3–5	Luetge (1–0)	**Allen** (1–3)	Chapman (4)	8,662	8–10	L3
19	April 24	Yankees	1–2	Cole (3–1)	**Bieber** (2–2)	Loáisiga (1)	8,817	8–11	L4
20	April 25	Yankees	7–3	**Hentges** (1–0)	Taillon (0–2)		8,766	9–11	W1
21	April 26	Twins	5–3 (10)	**Clase** (2–1)	Colomé (1–3)		4,555	10–11	W2
22	April 27	Twins	7–4	**Civale** (4–0)	Maeda (1–2)	**Karinchak** (2)	6,303	11–11	W3
23	April 28	Twins	2–10	Happ (2–0)	**Allen** (1–4)		5,903	11–12	L1
24	April 30	@ White Sox	5–3	**Bieber** (3–2)	Keuchel (1–1)	**Clase** (5)	9,405	12–12	W1

May: 17–12 (Home: 6–6; Away: 11–6)

#	Date	Opponent	Score	Win	Loss	Save	Attendance	Record	StreakUse background:#fbb for loss, #bfb for win, #bbb for cancelled/postponed -->
25	May 1	@ White Sox	3–7	Lynn (2–1)	**McKenzie** (0–1)		9,451	12–13	L1
26	May 2	@ White Sox	5–0	**Plesac** (2–3)	Giolito (1–3)		9,471	13–13	W1
27	May 3	@ Royals	8–6	**Shaw** (1–0)	Junis (1–2)	**Clase** (6)	6,919	14–13	W2
28	May 4	@ Royals	7–3	**Wittgren** (1–1)	Staumont (0–1)		5,997	15–13	W3
29	May 5	@ Royals	5–4	**Wittgren** (2–1)	Davis (0–1)	**Karinchak** (3)	9,640	16–13	W4
30	May 6	@ Royals	4–0	**McKenzie** (1–1)	Duffy (4–2)		9,259	17–13	W5
31	May 7	Reds	0–3	Miley (4–2)	**Clase** (2–2)		7,803	17–14	L1
32	May 8	Reds	9–2	**Civale** (5–0)	Castillo (1–4)		9,968	18–14	W1
—	May 9	Reds	Postponed (rain) make-up date August 9						
33	May 11	Cubs	3–2	**Bieber** (4–2)	Alzolay (1–3)	**Clase** (7)	8,024	19–14	W2
34	May 12	Cubs	2–1 (10)	**Karinchak** (1–0)	Thompson (1–1)	—	8,589	20–14	W3
35	May 13	@ Mariners	4–2	**Plesac** (3–3)	Gilbert (0–1)	**Shaw** (1)	9,880	21–14	W4
36	May 14	@ Mariners	3–7	Flexen (4–1)	**Civale** (5–1)	Montero (5)	10,014	21–15	L1
37	May 15	@ Mariners	3–7	Sheffield (3–3)	**McKenzie** (1–2)		10,311	21–16	L2
38	May 16	@ Mariners	2–3	Sewald (1–0)	**Bieber** (4–3)	Graveman (5)	10,287	21–17	L3
39	May 17	@ Angels	4–7	Watson (2–1)	**Hentges** (1–1)	Iglesias (7)	9,527	21–18	L4
40	May 18	@ Angels	6–5	**Plesac** (4–3)	Claudio (0–1)	**Karinchak** (4)	9,491	22–18	W1
41	May 19	@ Angels	3–2	**Civale** (6–1)	Watson (2–2)	**Karinchak** (5)	10,378	23–18	W2
42	May 21	Twins	0–10	Dobnak (1–3)	**McKenzie** (1–3)	—	11,675	23–19	L1
43	May 22	Twins	5–3 (10)	**Karinchak** (2–0)	Colomé (2–4)	—	11,505	24–19	W1
44	May 23	Twins	5–8 (10)	Robles (1–1)	**Karinchak** (2–1)	Duffey (1)	9,805	24–20	L1
45	May 24	@ Tigers	6–5	**Mejía** (1–0)	Garcia (0–1)	**Clase** (8)	7,832	25–20	W1
46	May 25	@ Tigers	4–0	**Civale** (7–1)	Skubal (1–7)	**Karinchak** (6)	8,000	26–20	W2
47	May 26	@ Tigers	0–1	Fulmer (4–3)	**Quantrill** (0–1)	Soto (5)	7,525	26–21	L1
48	May 27	@ Tigers	5–2	**Bieber** (5–3)	Boyd (2–6)	—	8,000	27–21	W1
49	May 28	Blue Jays	2–11 (7)	Ryu (5–2)	**Morgan** (0–1)	—	9,198	27–22	L1
—	May 29	Blue Jays	Postponed (high winds) make-up date May 30						
50	May 30 (G1)	Blue Jays	1–4 (7)	Stripling (1–3)	**Civale** (7–2)	Romano (3)	—	27–23	L2
51	May 30 (G2)	Blue Jays	6–5 (7)	**Clase** (3–2)	Chatwood (0–2)	—	11,690	28–23	W1
52	May 31 (G1)	White Sox	6–8 (8)	Heuer (4–1)	**Karinchak** (2–2)	Bummer (1)	—	28–24	L1
53	May 31 (G2)	White Sox	3–1 (7)	**Maton** (1–0)	Lambert (0–1)	**Clase** (9)	10,726	29–24	W1

June: 13–11 (Home: 8–3; Away: 5–8)

#	Date	Opponent	Score	Win	Loss	Save	Attendance	Record	StreakUse background:#fbb for loss, #bfb for win, #bbb for cancelled/postponed -->
54	June 1	White Sox	6–5	**Bieber** (6–3)	Cease (3–2)	**Karinchak** (7)	7,132	30–24	W2
—	June 2	White Sox	Postponed (rain) make-up date September 23						
55	June 4	@ Orioles	1–3	Sulser (2–0)	**Shaw** (1–1)	Fry (2)	12,009	30–25	L1
56	June 5	@ Orioles	10–4	**Civale** (8–2)	Means (4–2)		9,969	31–25	W1
57	June 6	@ Orioles	5–18	López (2–6)	**Quantrill** (0–2)		9,423	31–26	L1
58	June 8	@ Cardinals	10–1	**Bieber** (7–3)	Martínez (3–6)		16,178	32–26	W1
59	June 9	@ Cardinals	2–8	Wainwright (4–5)	**Mejía** (0–1)		16,331	32–27	L1
60	June 11	Mariners	7–0	**Civale** (9–2)	Dunn (1–3)		22,970	33–27	W1
61	June 12	Mariners	5–4 (10)	**Karinchak** (3–2)	Sewald (2–2)		20,116	34–27	W2
62	June 13	Mariners	2–6	Gilbert (2–2)	**Bieber** (7–4)		17,371	34–28	L1
63	June 14	Orioles	4–3	**Sandlin** (1–0)	Kremer (3–6)	**Clase** (10)	11,181	35–28	W1
64	June 15	Orioles	7–2	**Karinchak** (4–2)	Harvey (3–8)		12,025	36–28	W2
65	June 16	Orioles	8–7	**Civale** (10–2)	Akin (0–2)	**Clase** (11)	12,825	37–28	W3
66	June 17	Orioles	10–3	**Stephan** (1–0)	López (2–8)	—	15,121	38–28	W4
67	June 18	@ Pirates	10–11	Kuhl (1–4)	**Mejía** (1–2)	Rodriguez (8)	16,965	38–29	L1
68	June 19	@ Pirates	3–6	Stratton (2–0)	**Shaw** (1–2)	—	16,830	38–30	L2
69	June 20	@ Pirates	2–1	**Maton** (2–0)	Brubaker (4–6)	**Karinchak** (8)	16,582	39–30	W1
70	June 21	@ Cubs	4–0	**Shaw** (2–2)	Alzolay (4–6)		32,934	40–30	W2
71	June 22	@ Cubs	1–7	Hendricks (10–4)	**Morgan** (0–2)		35,493	40–31	L1
72	June 24	@ Twins	4–1	**Parker** (1–0)	Alcalá (1–2)	**Karinchak** (9)	18,812	41–31	W1
73	June 25	@ Twins	7–8	Jax (1–0)	**Wittgren** (2–2)	Robles (7)	16,892	41–32	L1
—	June 26	@ Twins	Postponed (rain) make-up date September 14						
74	June 27	@ Twins	2–8	Happ (4–3)	**Hentges** (1–2)		20,215	41–33	L2
75	June 28	Tigers	13–5	**Morgan** (1–2)	Manning (1–2)		13,128	42–33	W1
—	June 29	Tigers	Postponed (rain) make-up date June 30						
76	June 30	Tigers	4–9 (7)	Funkhouser (2–0)	**Shaw** (2–3)		—	42–34	L1
77	June 30	Tigers	1–7 (7)	Peralta (1–1)	**Allen** (1–5)		11,627	42–35	L2

July: 9–15 (Home: 5–8; Away: 4–7)

#	Date	Opponent	Score	Win	Loss	Save	Attendance	Record	StreakUse background:#fbb for loss, #bfb for win, #bbb for cancelled/postponed -->
78	July 1	Astros	2–7	Valdez (5–1)	**Mejía** (1–3)		13,772	42–36	L3
79	July 2	Astros	3–6	McCullers Jr. (6–1)	**Hentges** (1–3)	Pressly (13)	24,337	42–37	L4
80	July 3	Astros	2–3	Odorizzi (3–3)	**Morgan** (1–3)	Pressly (14)	24,961	42–38	L5
81	July 4	Astros	3–4 (10)	Taylor (1–2)	**Clase** (3–3)	Raley (2)	17,412	42–39	L6
82	July 5	@ Rays	8–9	Fairbanks (2–3)	**Clase** (3–4)		8,832	42–40	L7
—	July 6	@ Rays	Postponed (Tropical Storm Elsa) make-up date July 7						
83	July 7	@ Rays	1–8	Wacha (2–2)	**Mejía** (1–4)		—	42–41	L8
84	July 7	@ Rays	0–4	Fleming (7–4)	**Hentges** (1–4)		10,905	42–42	L9
85	July 8	Royals	7–4	**Karinchak** (5–2)	Holland (2–4)		13,272	43–42	W1
86	July 9	Royals	2–1	**Karinchak** (6–2)	Brentz (2–2)		21,395	44–42	W2
87	July 10	Royals	14–6	**Quantrill** (1–2)	Minor (6–8)		24,077	45–42	W3
—	July 11	Royals	Postponed (rain) make-up date September 20						
**91st All-Star Game: Denver, CO**
88	July 16	@ Athletics	4–5	Romo (1–0)	**Clase** (3–5)		12,361	45–43	L1
89	July 17	@ Athletics	3–2	**Quantrill** (2–2)	Montas (8–8)	**Karinchak** (10)	11,374	46–43	W1
90	July 18	@ Athletics	4–2	**Plesac** (5–3)	Bassitt (10–3)	**Shaw** (2)	8,572	47–43	W2
91	July 19	@ Astros	3–4	Greinke (9–3)	**Mejía** (1–5)	Pressly (17)	21,963	47–44	L1
92	July 20	@ Astros	3–9	García (7–5)	**McKenzie** (1–4)		26,586	47–45	L2
93	July 21	@ Astros	5–4	**Shaw** (3–3)	Pruitt (0–1)	**Karinchak** (11)	21,712	48–45	W1
94	July 22	Rays	4–5 (10)	Fairbanks (3–3)	**Shaw** (3–4)	Castillo (14)	19,338	48–46	L1
95	July 23	Rays	5–10	Wisler (3–3)	**Wittgren** (2–3)		23,180	48–47	L2
96	July 24	Rays	2–8	Head (1–0)	**Mejía** (1–6)		23,194	48–48	L3
97	July 25	Rays	3–2	**Karinchak** (7–2)	Wisler (3–4)	**Clase** (12)	18,614	49–48	W1
98	July 27	Cardinals	2–4	Wainwright (8–6)	**Shaw** (3–5)	Reyes (24)	19,480	49–49	L1
99	July 28	Cardinals	7–2	**Plesac** (6–3)	Kim (6–6)		19,927	50–49	W1
100	July 30	@ White Sox	4–6	Ruiz (1–1)	**Karinchak** (7–3)	Hendriks (26)	36,123	50–50	L1
101	July 31	@ White Sox	12–11	**Garza** (1–0)	Kopech (3–1)	**Clase** (13)	35,866	51–50	W1

August: 14–14 (Home: 9–7; Away: 5–7)

#	Date	Opponent	Score	Win	Loss	Save	Attendance	Record	StreakUse background:#fbb for loss, #bfb for win, #bbb for cancelled/postponed -->
102	August 1	@ White Sox	1–2	Hendriks (5–2)	**Wittgren** (2–4)		34,344	51–51	L1
103	August 2	@ Blue Jays	5–2 (10)	**Shaw** (4–5)	Hand (5–6)	**Clase** (14)	14,653	52–51	W1
104	August 3	@ Blue Jays	2–7	Ryu (11–5)	**Plesac** (6–4)		14,270	52–52	L1
105	August 4	@ Blue Jays	6–8	Matz (9–6)	**Mejía** (1–7)		14,410	52–53	L2
106	August 5	@ Blue Jays	0–3	Stripling (5–6)	**McKenzie** (1–5)	Cimber (1)	14,289	52–54	L3
107	August 6	Tigers	6–1	**Quantrill** (3–2)	Manning (2–5)	**Clase** (15)	24,485	53–54	W1
108	August 7	Tigers	1–2	Alexander (2–1)	**Morgan** (1–4)	Soto (13)	24,560	53–55	L1
109	August 8	Tigers	7–5	**Shaw** (5–5)	Ramírez (1–1)	**Clase** (16)	19,899	54–55	W1
110	August 9	Reds	9–3	**Garza** (2–0)	Castillo (6–11)		10,708	55–55	W2
111	August 10	Athletics	3–4 (10)	Trivino (5–4)	**Wittgren** (2–5)	Chafin (1)	13,041	55–56	L1
112	August 11	Athletics	3–6	Diekman (3–2)	**Sandlin** (1–1)	Trivino (19)	13,560	55–57	L2
113	August 12	Athletics	0–17	Bassitt (12–3)	**Morgan** (1–5)		16,559	55–58	L3
114	August 13	@ Tigers	7–4	**Plesac** (7–4)	Alexander (2–2)		22,107	56–58	W1
115	August 14	@ Tigers	4–6	Fulmer (5–4)	**Shaw** (5–6)	Soto (15)	32,845	56–59	L1
116	August 15	@ Tigers	11–0	**McKenzie** (2–5)	Hutchinson (0–1)		25,684	57–59	W1
117	August 16	@ Twins	4–5 (10)	Thielbar (5–0)	**Wittgren** (2–6)		15,622	57–60	L1
118	August 17	@ Twins	3–1	**Morgan** (2–5)	Ober (1–2)	**Clase** (17)	19,605	58–60	W1
119	August 18	@ Twins	7–8 (11)	Coulombe (3–1)	**Garza** (2–1)		19,949	58–61	L1
120	August 20	Angels	9–1	**Stephan** (2–0)	Barría (2–2)		22,755	59–61	W1
121	August 21	Angels	5–1	**McKenzie** (3–5)	Detmers (1–3)		31,406	60–61	W2
122	August 22	Angels	3–0	**Quantrill** (4–2)	Suarez (5–7)	**Clase** (18)	1,832	61–61	W3
123	August 24	Rangers	3–7	Hearn (3–4)	**Morgan** (2–6)		11,369	61–62	L1
124	August 25	Rangers	7–2	**Plesac** (8–4)	Latz (0–1)		11,398	62–62	W1
125	August 26	Rangers	10–6	**Stephan** (3–0)	Lyles (6–11)	—	10,827	63–62	W2
126	August 27	Red Sox	3–4	Rodriguez (10–7)	**Karinchak** (7–4)	Ottavino (9)	20,881	63–63	L1
127	August 28	Red Sox	3–5 (10)	Whitlock (6–2)	**Wittgren** (2–7)	Ottavino (10)	26,221	63–64	L2
128	August 29	Red Sox	7–5	**Shaw** (6–6)	Davis (0–2)	**Clase** (19)	22,883	64–64	W1
129	August 31	@ Royals	7–2	**Plesac** (9–4)	Junis (2–4)	—	11,542	65–64	W2

September/October: 15–18 (Home: 5–11; Away: 10–7)

#	Date	Opponent	Score	Win	Loss	Save	Attendance	Record	StreakUse background:#fbb for loss, #bfb for win, #bbb for cancelled/postponed -->
130	September 1	@ Royals	5–3 (11)	**Parker** (2–0)	Santana (1–2)	**Stephan** (1)	10,516	66–64	W3
131	September 2	@ Royals	4–2	**McKenzie** (4–5)	Minor (8–12)	**Clase** (20)	10,042	67–64	W4
132	September 3	@ Red Sox	5–8	Ottavino (4–3)	**Quantrill** (4–3)	Whitlock (2)	31,127	67–65	L1
133	September 4	@ Red Sox	3–4	Ottavino (5–3)	**Shaw** (6–7)		33,081	67–66	L2
134	September 5	@ Red Sox	11–5	**Plesac** (10–4)	Crawford (0–1)	**Clase** (21)	27,578	68–66	W1
135	September 6	Twins	2–5	Pineda (5–8)	**Allen** (1–6)	Colomé (12)	12,675	68–67	L1
136	September 7	Twins	0–3	Gant (5–9)	**Civale** (10–3)	Colomé (13)	10,448	68–68	L2
137	September 8	Twins	0–3	Ryan (1–1)	**McKenzie** (4–6)	Duffey (3)	11,037	68–69	L3
138	September 9	Twins	4–1	**Quantrill** (5–3)	Albers (1–2)	**Clase** (22)	11,846	69–69	W1
139	September 10	Brewers	3–10	Houser (9–6)	**Morgan** (2–7)		17,667	69–70	L1
140	September 11	Brewers	0–3	Burnes (10–4)	**Plesac** (10–5)	Hader (31)	20,100	69–71	L2
141	September 12	Brewers	1–11	Lauer (6–5)	**Civale** (10–4)	Ashby (1)	16,332	69–72	L3
142	September 14 (G1)	@ Twins	3–1 (7)	**McKenzie** (5–6)	Coulombe (3–2)	**Clase** (23)	15,319	70–72	W1
143	September 14 (G2)	@ Twins	3–6 (7)	Barraclough (1–0)	**Allen** (1–7)	Colomé (14)	18,905	70–73	L1
144	September 15	@ Twins	12–3	**Quantrill** (6–3)	Jax (3–4)		14,222	71–73	W1
145	September 17	@ Yankees	0–8	Kluber (5–3)	**Plesac** (10–6)		31,403	71–74	L1
146	September 18	@ Yankees	11–3	**Civale** (11–4)	Gil (1–1)		39,088	72–74	W1
147	September 19	@ Yankees	11–1	**Morgan** (3–7)	Cole (15–8)		34,110	73–74	W2
148	September 20 (G1)	Royals	2–7 (7)	Singer (5–10)	**McKenzie** (5–7)		—	73–75	L1
149	September 20 (G2)	Royals	2–4 (7)	Tapia (3–0)	**Wittgren** (2–8)	Barlow (14)	11,459	73–76	L2
150	September 21	Royals	4–1	**Quantrill** (7–3)	Lynch (4–6)	**Clase** (24)	23,341	74–76	W1
—	September 22	Royals	Postponed (rain) make-up date September 27						
151	September 23 (G1)	White Sox	2–7 (7)	Bummer (4–5)	**Civale** (11–5)	—	11,851	74–77	L1
152	September 23 (G2)	White Sox	5–3 (7)	**Clase** (4–5)	Ruiz (1–3)		11,336	75–77	W1
153	September 24	White Sox	0–1	Cease (13–7)	**Stephan** (3–1)	Hendriks (35)	18,576	75–78	L1
154	September 25	White Sox	6–0	**Morgan** (4–7)	Lynn (10–6)		24,082	76–78	W1
155	September 26	White Sox	2–5	Giolito (11–9)	**McKenzie** (5–8)	Hendriks (36)	21,957	76–79	L1
156	September 27	Royals	8–3	**Quantrill** (8–3)	Kowar (0–5)		13,121	77–79	W1
157	September 28	@ Royals	4–6	Staumont (4–3)	**Parker** (2–1)		11,670	77–80	L1
158	September 29	@ Royals	5–10	Holland (3–5)	**Wittgren** (2–9)		10,373	77–81	L2
159	September 30	@ Royals	6–1	**Allen** (2–7)	Zerpa (0–1)		11,288	78–81	W1
160	October 1	@ Rangers	9–6	**Morgan** (5–7)	Howard (0–5)		22,700	79–81	W2
161	October 2	@ Rangers	2–7	Lyles (10–13)	**McKenzie** (5–9)		27,362	79–82	L1
162	October 3	@ Rangers	6–0	**Civale** (12–5)	Dunning (5–10)		28,396	80–82	W1

Legend: = Win = Loss = Postponement
Bold = Indians team member

== Player stats ==
=== Batting ===
Note: G = Games played; AB = At bats; R = Runs; H = Hits; 2B = Doubles; 3B = Triples; HR = Home runs; RBI = Runs batted in; AVG = Batting average; SB = Stolen bases

Player	G	AB	R	H	2B	3B	HR	RBI	AVG	SB
Logan Allen	1	1	0	0	0	0	0	0	.000	0
Jake Bauers	43	100	7	19	3	0	2	6	.190	0
Shane Bieber	2	6	0	0	0	0	0	0	.000	0
Bobby Bradley	74	245	36	51	10	0	16	41	.208	0
Yu Chang	89	237	32	54	14	3	9	39	.228	1
Aaron Civale	1	1	0	0	0	0	0	0	.000	0
Emmanuel Clase	5	0	0	0	0	0	0	0	—	0
Ernie Clement	40	121	16	28	4	0	3	9	.231	0
Ben Gamel	11	14	1	1	1	0	0	0	.071	0
Andrés Giménez	68	188	23	41	10	0	5	16	.218	11
Austin Hedges	88	286	32	51	7	0	10	31	.178	1
Sam Hentges	1	1	0	0	0	0	0	0	.000	0
Cesar Hernandez	96	376	60	87	17	2	18	47	.231	0
Daniel Johnson	30	77	9	17	0	0	4	5	.221	1
James Karinchak	6	0	0	0	0	0	0	0	—	0
Ryan Lavarnway	9	28	2	7	3	0	0	0	.250	0
Jordan Luplow	36	98	12	17	5	0	7	20	.173	0
Phil Maton	4	1	0	0	0	0	0	0	.000	0
Triston McKenzie	1	2	0	1	0	0	0	0	.500	0
Jean Carlos Mejía	2	1	0	0	0	0	0	0	.000	0
Oscar Mercado	72	214	27	48	11	1	6	19	.224	7
Owen Miller	60	191	17	39	8	0	4	18	.204	2
Eli Morgan	1	2	0	0	0	0	0	0	.000	0
Josh Naylor	69	233	28	59	13	0	7	21	.253	1
Kyle Nelson	2	0	0	0	0	0	0	0	—	0
Blake Parker	4	0	0	0	0	0	0	0	—	0
Oliver Perez	2	0	0	0	0	0	0	0	—	0
Roberto Perez	44	141	13	21	3	0	7	17	.149	1
Cal Quantrill	3	2	0	1	0	0	0	0	.500	0
Harold Ramírez	99	339	33	91	21	1	7	42	.268	3
José Ramírez	152	552	111	147	32	5	36	103	.266	27
Wilson Ramos	9	31	3	7	0	0	2	7	.226	0
Franmil Reyes	115	418	57	106	18	2	30	85	.254	4
Rene Rivera	21	55	6	13	3	0	2	9	.236	0
Amed Rosario	141	550	77	155	25	6	11	57	.282	13
Eddie Rosario	78	283	29	72	15	1	7	46	.254	9
Nick Sandlin	3	0	0	0	0	0	0	0	—	0
Bryan Shaw	4	0	0	0	0	0	0	0	—	0
Trevor Stephan	4	0	0	0	0	0	0	0	—	0
Myles Straw	60	239	42	68	16	0	2	14	.285	13
Nick Wittgren	3	0	0	0	0	0	0	0	—	0
Bradley Zimmer	99	299	44	68	9	1	8	35	.227	15
Team totals	162	5332	717	1269	248	22	203	686	.238	109

=== Pitching ===
Note: W = Wins; L = Losses; ERA = Earned run average; G = Games pitched; GS = Games started; SV = Saves; IP = Innings pitched; H = Hits allowed; R = Total runs allowed; ER = Earned runs allowed; BB = Walks allowed; K = Strikeouts

Player	W	L	ERA	G	GS	SV	IP	H	R	ER	BB	K
Logan Allen	2	7	6.26	14	11	0	50.1	58	39	35	17	37
Shane Bieber	7	4	3.17	16	16	0	96.2	84	36	34	33	134
Aaron Civale	12	5	3.84	21	21	0	124.1	108	56	53	31	99
Emmanuel Clase	4	5	1.29	71	0	24	69.2	51	18	10	16	74
Justin Garza	2	1	4.71	21	0	0	28.2	27	16	15	18	29
Anthony Gose	0	0	1.35	6	0	0	6.2	2	1	1	2	9
Sam Hentges	1	4	6.68	30	12	0	68.2	90	54	51	32	68
D. J. Johnson	0	0	5.40	1	0	0	1.2	2	1	1	0	3
James Karinchak	7	4	4.07	60	0	11	55.1	35	27	25	32	78
Phil Maton	2	0	4.57	38	1	0	41.1	36	21	21	20	61
Triston McKenzie	5	9	4.95	25	24	0	120.0	84	66	66	58	136
Jean Carlos Mejía	1	7	8.25	17	11	0	52.1	60	48	48	24	47
Eli Morgan	5	7	5.34	18	18	0	89.1	90	54	53	22	81
Kyle Nelson	0	0	9.31	10	0	0	9.2	10	10	10	8	8
Blake Parker	2	1	3.09	47	0	0	43.2	43	15	15	14	37
Francisco Pérez	0	0	4.05	4	0	0	6.2	6	3	3	3	5
Oliver Perez	0	1	0.00	5	0	0	3.2	5	1	0	1	4
Zach Plesac	10	6	4.67	25	25	0	142.2	137	79	74	34	100
Cal Quantrill	8	3	2.89	40	22	0	149.2	129	55	48	47	121
Nick Sandlin	1	1	2.94	34	0	0	33.2	21	15	11	17	48
Bryan Shaw	6	7	3.49	81	0	2	77.1	69	33	30	38	71
Trevor Stephan	3	1	4.41	43	0	1	63.1	58	32	31	31	75
Nick Wittgren	2	9	5.05	60	1	1	62.1	61	38	35	17	61
Alex Young	0	0	7.84	10	0	0	10.1	15	9	9	7	5
Team totals	80	82	4.34	162	162	39	1408.0	1281	727	679	522	1391

== Roster ==
2021 Cleveland Indians
Roster
Pitchers: 54 Logan Allen; 57 Shane Bieber; 43 Aaron Civale; 48 Emmanuel Clase; 63 Justin Garza; 26 Anthony Gose; 31 Sam Hentges; 56 DJ Johnson; 99 James Karinchak; 88 Phil Maton; 24 Triston McKenzie; 36 J. C. Mejía; 49 Eli Morgan; 30 Kyle Nelson; 53 Blake Parker; 65 Francisco Pérez; 39 Óliver Pérez; 34 Zach Plesac; 47 Cal Quantrill; 52 Nick Sandlin; 27 Bryan Shaw; 37 Trevor Stephan; 62 Nick Wittgren; 46 Alex Young	Catchers: 17 Austin Hedges; 50 Ryan Lavarnway; 55 Roberto Pérez; 40 Wilson Ramos; 46 René Rivera; Infielders: 10 Jake Bauers; 44 Bobby Bradley; 2 Yu Chang; 28 Ernie Clement; 0 Andrés Giménez; 7 César Hernández; 6 Owen Miller; 11 José Ramírez; 1 Amed Rosario	Outfielders: 28 Ben Gamel; 23 Daniel Johnson; 8 Jordan Luplow; 35 Oscar Mercado; 22 Josh Naylor; 40 Harold Ramírez; 32 Franmil Reyes; 9 Eddie Rosario; 7 Myles Straw; 4 Bradley Zimmer	Manager: 77 Terry Francona; 33 DeMarlo Hale; Coaches: 15 Sandy Alomar Jr. (first base/catchers); 87 Mike Barnett (assistant coach/replays); 64 Armando Camacaro (bullpen catcher/staff assistant); 33 DeMarlo Hale (bench); 97 Kyle Hudson (third base); 58 Ruben Niebla (assistant pitching); 82 Ricky Pacione (bullpen catcher/staff assistant); 60 Vic Rodriguez (assistant hitting); 16 Mike Sarbaugh (bench); 85 Brian Sweeney (bullpen); 96 Justin Toole (hitting analyst); 29 Ty Van Burkleo (hitting); 51 Carl Willis (pitching)

== Farm system ==
Level	Team	League	Manager
AAA	Columbus Clippers	Triple-A East	Andy Tracy
AA	Akron RubberDucks	Double-A Northeast	Rouglas Odor
High-A	Lake County Captains	High-A Central	Greg DiCenzo
A	Lynchburg Hillcats	Low-A East	Dennis Malave
Rookie	ACL Indians	Arizona Complex League	Jerry Owens
Rookie	DSL Indians	Dominican Summer League	Jesus Tavares
