= 2021 Chicago White Sox season =

2021 Chicago White Sox
- American League Central champions
- League: American League
- Division: Central
- Ballpark: Guaranteed Rate Field
- City: Chicago
- Record: 93–69 (.574)
- Divisional place: 1st
- Owners: Jerry Reinsdorf
- General managers: Rick Hahn
- Managers: Tony La Russa
- Television: NBC Sports Chicago; NBC Sports Chicago+ (Jason Benetti, Steve Stone, Len Kasper, Mike Monaco (fill-in), Gordon Beckham)
- Radio: ESPN Chicago; Chicago White Sox Radio Network (Len Kasper, Darrin Jackson, Connor McKnight); WRTO-AM (Spanish) (Hector Molina, Billy Russo)
- Stats: ESPN.com; Baseball Reference

The 2021 Chicago White Sox season was the club's 122nd season in Chicago and 121st season in the American League, and their 1st season under manager Tony La Russa since 1986. The White Sox played their home games at Guaranteed Rate Field. On September 23, after a win against the Cleveland Indians, the White Sox clinched the American League Central for the first time since the 2008 season and became the first Major League team of the 2021 season to clinch their division. They finished the regular season with a 93–69 record, good enough for third in the American League and their most wins as a franchise since the 2005 season. By winning the American League Central, it secured the team their first back-to-back postseason appearance in franchise history after having clinched a wild card berth in the previous season. They lost to the Houston Astros in the 2021 American League Division Series. Until the 2026 MLB Season, this was the last season the White Sox qualified for the MLB postseason.

== Offseason ==
=== Manager ===
On October 12, 2020, the White Sox fired manager Rick Renteria. He had managed the team for 4 seasons, leading them to a playoff appearance in 2020. On October 29, 2020, the White Sox announced that they would hire Tony La Russa, who managed the team from 1979 to 1986. La Russa, age 76, became the oldest person to manage an MLB team. La Russa had not managed a team since the 2011 St. Louis Cardinals who won the World Series that year.

=== Transactions ===
- December 2, 2020: White Sox sign a one-year, $862,500 contract with pitcher Jace Fry. White Sox also non-tender outfielder Nomar Mazara and pitcher Carlos Rodón.
- December 7, 2020: White Sox trade pitchers Dane Dunning and Avery Weems to the Texas Rangers for pitcher Lance Lynn.
- December 10, 2020: Outfielder Adam Eaton signed a one-year, $7 million contract.
- December 30, 2020: White Sox sign a one-year, $1.375 million contract with outfielder Adam Engel.
- December 31, 2020: White Sox sign a one-year $2 million contract with pitcher Evan Marshall.
- January 15, 2021: White Sox sign contracts to three players – Liam Hendriks (four-year, $54 million), Lucas Giolito (one-year, $4.15 million), and Reynaldo López (one-year, $2.1 million). The White Sox also signed international players Yoelkis Céspedes and Norge Vera to both one-year, $2.05/1.5 million contracts respectively.
- February 1, 2021: Pitcher Carlos Rodón signed a one-year, $3 million contract. Pitcher Emilio Vargas designated for assignment in a corresponding move.

== Regular season ==
=== City Connect jerseys ===
On May 28, the White Sox unveiled the City Connect jerseys. They wore the jerseys for the first time on June 5 against the Detroit Tigers. The jerseys are black with white stripes and the hat logo has a "CHI" instead of the "SOX" logo. The jerseys pay homage to the South Side of Chicago.

=== American League Central ===
AL Central
Team	W	L	Pct.	GB	Home	Road
Chicago White Sox	93	69	.574	—	53‍–‍28	40‍–‍41
Cleveland Indians	80	82	.494	13	40‍–‍41	40‍–‍41
Detroit Tigers	77	85	.475	16	42‍–‍39	35‍–‍46
Kansas City Royals	74	88	.457	19	39‍–‍42	35‍–‍46
Minnesota Twins	73	89	.451	20	38‍–‍43	35‍–‍46

=== American League Wild Card ===
Division leaders
Team	W	L	Pct.
Tampa Bay Rays	100	62	.617
Houston Astros	95	67	.586
Chicago White Sox	93	69	.574

Wild Card teams (Top 2 teams qualify for postseason)
Team	W	L	Pct.	GB
Boston Red Sox	92	70	.568	—
New York Yankees	92	70	.568	—
Toronto Blue Jays	91	71	.562	1
Seattle Mariners	90	72	.556	2
Oakland Athletics	86	76	.531	6
Cleveland Indians	80	82	.494	12
Los Angeles Angels	77	85	.475	15
Detroit Tigers	77	85	.475	15
Kansas City Royals	74	88	.457	18
Minnesota Twins	73	89	.451	19
Texas Rangers	60	102	.370	32
Baltimore Orioles	52	110	.321	40

=== White Sox team leaders ===
Batting
Batting average†	Tim Anderson	.309
Runs scored	Tim Anderson	94
Stolen bases	Tim Anderson	18
RBIs	José Abreu	117
Home runs	José Abreu	30
Pitching
Wins	Dylan Cease/Carlos Rodón	13
ERA‡	Lucas Giolito	3.53
IP	Lucas Giolito	178.2
WHIP‡	Lucas Giolito	1.10
Strikeouts	Dylan Cease	226
Saves	Liam Hendriks	38

† Minimum 3.1 plate appearances per team games played
AVG qualified batters: Abreu, Anderson, Moncada, Vaughn
‡ Minimum 1 inning pitched per team games played
ERA & WHIP qualified pitchers: Cease, Giolito, Keuchel

=== Record against opponents ===
2021 American League record Source: MLB Standings Grid – 2021
Team	BAL	BOS	CWS	CLE	DET	HOU	KC	LAA	MIN	NYY	OAK	SEA	TB	TEX	TOR	NL
Baltimore	—	6–13	0–7	2–5	2–5	3–3	4–3	2–4	2–4	8–11	3–3	3–4	1–18	4–3	5–14	7–13
Boston	13–6	—	3–4	4–2	3–3	2–5	5–2	3–3	5–2	10–9	3–3	4–3	8–11	3–4	10–9	16–4
Chicago	7–0	4–3	—	10–9	12–7	2–5	9–10	2–5	13–6	1–5	4–3	3–3	3–3	5–1	4–3	14–6
Cleveland	5–2	2–4	9–10	—	12–7	1–6	14–5	5–1	8–11	3–4	2–4	3–4	1–6	4–2	2–5	9–11
Detroit	5–2	3–3	7–12	7–12	—	5–2	8–11	1–6	8–11	3–3	1–6	5–1	4–3	6–1	3–3	11–9
Houston	3–3	5–2	5–2	6–1	2–5	—	3–4	13–6	3–4	2–4	11–8	11–8	4–2	14–5	4–2	9–11
Kansas City	3–4	2–5	10–9	5–14	11–8	4–3	—	2–4	10–9	2–4	2–5	4–3	2–4	2–4	3–4	12–8
Los Angeles	4–2	3–3	5–2	1–5	6–1	6–13	4–2	—	5–2	4–3	4–15	8–11	1–6	11–8	4–3	11–9
Minnesota	4–2	2–5	6–13	11–8	11–8	4–3	9–10	2–5	—	1–6	1–5	2–4	3–3	4–3	3–4	10–10
New York	11–8	9–10	5–1	4–3	3–3	4–2	4–2	3–4	6–1	—	4–3	5–2	8–11	6–1	8–11	12–8
Oakland	3–3	3–3	3–4	4–2	6–1	8–11	5–2	15–4	5–1	3–4	—	4–15	4–3	10–9	2–5	11–9
Seattle	4–3	3–4	3–3	4–3	1–5	8–11	3–4	11–8	4–2	2–5	15–4	—	6–1	13–6	4–2	9–11
Tampa Bay	18–1	11–8	3–3	6–1	3–4	2–4	4–2	6–1	3–3	11–8	3–4	1–6	—	3–4	11–8	15–5
Texas	3–4	4–3	1–5	2–4	1–6	5–14	4–2	8–11	3–4	1–6	9–10	6–13	4–3	—	2–4	7–13
Toronto	14–5	9–10	3–4	5–2	3–3	2–4	4–3	3–4	4–3	11–8	5–2	2–4	8–11	4–2	—	14–6

Updated with the results of all games through October 3, 2021.

=== Transactions ===
- May 4, 2021: Outfielder Brian Goodwin signed a minor league contract. He eventually was called up to the active roster and made his season debut June 12 against the Detroit Tigers.
- July 7, 2021: White Sox designated outfielder Adam Eaton for assignment.
- July 29, 2021: White Sox trade pitcher Konnor Pilkington to the Cleveland Indians for second baseman César Hernández.
- July 29, 2021: White Sox trade pitcher Bailey Horn to the Chicago Cubs for pitcher Ryan Tepera.
- July 30, 2021: White Sox trade second baseman Nick Madrigal and pitcher Codi Heuer to the Chicago Cubs for pitcher Craig Kimbrel.

=== Achievements ===
- Yermín Mercedes became the first MLB player of the modern era to start a season 8-for-8. He picked up five hits on April 2 against the Los Angeles Angels becoming the first player in White Sox history to record five hits in their first start and the following day he picked up three hits in his first three at bats.
- On April 14, Carlos Rodón pitched the twentieth no hitter in White Sox history against the Cleveland Indians. Rodón pitched eight perfect innings and retired the first batter he faced in the ninth inning before hitting Cleveland catcher Roberto Pérez in the foot. Pérez was the only base runner Rodón allowed. Rodón struck out 7 batters and threw 75 of 114 pitches for strikes.
- Tony La Russa surpassed John McGraw for second all-time in career wins as a manager. This milestone in La Russa's career occurred as a result of the team's 3–0 victory over the Detroit Tigers on June 6.
- The White Sox had four players selected to play for the American League in the 2021 MLB All-Star Game: Tim Anderson, Liam Hendriks, Lance Lynn, and Carlos Rodón. During the game, Lynn pitched one shutout inning, where he gave up no hits, one walk, and struck out catcher J. T. Realmuto of the National League. Hendriks pitched to close out the game for the American League and recorded the save, becoming the first Australian-born baseball player to do so. Anderson was substituted into the game as a defensive replacement, but was not able to record an at-bat.
- On July 31, Seby Zavala became the first player in MLB history to hit his first three career home runs in the same game. His first two were hit off of the Cleveland Indians starter Triston McKenzie (with one of them being a grand slam) and his third came off of reliever Bryan Shaw.
- On August 8 and 9, Eloy Jiménez became the first player in White Sox history to hit 2 Home Runs and 5 RBI's in back-to-back games. His two home runs on August 8 came off of Chicago Cubs pitchers Zach Davies and Michael Rucker and his two homers on August 9 came off of Minnesota Twins pitcher Beau Burrows. It was the first time a Major League player had at least two home runs and five RBIs in back-to-back games since Bryce Harper in 2015.
- José Abreu surpassed Harold Baines for the third most home runs in White Sox history. His 222nd career home run with the club came as a game-tying hit in the ninth inning against the New York Yankees off of Chad Green on August 14.
- On August 16, Craig Kimbrel recorded his 1000th career strikeout. He became the fastest pitcher in Major League history to reach that career milestone, doing it in just over 613 innings pitched. The strikeout was recorded against Matt Chapman of the Oakland Athletics.
- The White Sox pitching staff lead the American League in Complete Games (4), Hits allowed (1,205), Runs allowed (636), Earned Runs allowed (581), and Strikeouts (1588).
- The White Sox finished with the best home record in the American League, going 53-28 (a .650 win percentage) at Guaranteed Rate Field.
- Closer Liam Hendriks completed the season with the most saves in the American League (38). This was the first time that a White Sox pitcher accomplished such a feat since Bobby Thigpen in 1990. Hendriks also led Major League relievers in strikeouts (113) becoming the first White Sox pitcher to have 100 or more strikeouts in relief.
- Dylan Cease led the American League in K/9 with 12.3.
- The White Sox had 6 pitchers with 100 or more strikeouts. Dylan Cease (226), Lucas Giolito (201), Carlos Rodón (185), Lance Lynn (176), Liam Hendriks (113), and Michael Kopech (103). It is the most pitchers to have 100 or more strikeouts in one season in franchise history.
- The White Sox had 4 pitchers finish in the top 11 of the Cy Young Award voting with Lucas Giolito (T-11th), Liam Hendriks (8th), Carlos Rodón (5th), and Lance Lynn (3rd).

== Game log ==
On November 23, MLB announced that the White Sox would face the New York Yankees in the first MLB at Field of Dreams game in Dyersville, Iowa, on August 12. This game was originally scheduled for August 13, 2020. The White Sox won the game 9–8 on a walk-off two run home run by Tim Anderson.

2021 regular season game log: 93–69 (Home: 53–28; Away: 40–41)
April: 14–11 (Home: 8–5; Away: 6–6)

#	Date	Opponent	Time (CT)	Score	Win	Loss	Save	Attendance	Record	Streak
1	April 1	@ Angels	9:05 pm	3–4	Mayers (1–0)	**Bummer** (0–1)	Iglesias (1)	13,207	0–1	L1
2	April 2	@ Angels	8:38 pm	12–8	**Kopech** (1–0)	Heaney (0–1)	**Hendriks** (1)	12,763	1–1	W1
3	April 3	@ Angels	8:07 pm	3–5	Guerra (1–0)	**Marshall** (0–1)	—	12,043	1–2	L1
4	April 4	@ Angels	7:37 pm	4–7	Iglesias (1–0)	**Ruiz** (0–1)	—	12,396	1–3	L2
5	April 5	@ Mariners	9:10 pm	6–0	**Rodón** (1–0)	Sheffield (0–1)	—	6,436	2–3	W1
6	April 6	@ Mariners	9:10 pm	10–4	**Giolito** (1–0)	Margevicius (0–1)	—	7,980	3–3	W2
7	April 7	@ Mariners	3:10 pm	4–8	Vest (1–0)	**Foster** (0–1)	—	7,429	3–4	L1
8	April 8	Royals	3:10 pm	6–0	**Lynn** (1–0)	Keller (0–1)	—	8,207	4–4	W1
–	April 10	Royals	1:10 pm	Postponed (Rain, Makeup May 14)						
9	April 11	Royals	1:10 pm	3–4 (10)	Holland (1–1)	**Crochet** (0–1)	Zimmer (1)	7,695	4–5	L1
10	April 12	Indians	7:10 pm	4–3	**Heuer** (1–0)	Clase (1–1)	—	7,393	5–5	W1
11	April 13	Indians	7:10 pm	0–2 (10)	Bieber (1–1)	**Crochet** (0–2)	Karinchak (1)	7,102	5–6	L1
12	April 14	Indians	7:10 pm	8–0	**Rodón** (2–0)	Plesac (1–2)	—	7,148	6–6	W1
13	April 15	Indians	1:10 pm	2–4	Civale (3–0)	**Lynn** (1–1)	Clase (3)	7,049	6–7	L1
—	April 16	@ Red Sox	6:10 pm	Postponed (Snow, Makeup April 18)						
14	April 17	@ Red Sox	3:05 pm	4–7	Ottavino (2–1)	**Heuer** (1–1)	—	4,668	6–8	L2
15	April 18 (1)	@ Red Sox	12:10 pm	3–2 (7)	**Keuchel** (1–0)	Houck (0–2)	**Hendriks** (2)	4,679	7–8	W1
16	April 18 (2)	@ Red Sox	4:10 pm	5–1 (7)	**Foster** (1–1)	Pérez (0–1)	—	4,601	8–8	W2
17	April 19	@ Red Sox	10:10 am	4–11	Eovaldi (3–1)	**Giolito** (1–1)	—	4,738	8–9	L1
18	April 20	@ Indians	5:10 pm	8–5	**Rodón** (3–0)	Plesac (1–3)	**Hendriks** (3)	4,176	9–9	W1
—	April 21	@ Indians	5:10 pm	Postponed (Rain, Makeup May 31)						
19	April 23	Rangers	7:10 pm	9–7	**Heuer** (2–1)	Cody (0–2)	**Hendriks** (4)	8,969	10–9	W2
20	April 24	Rangers	6:10 pm	2–1	**Hendriks** (1–0)	King (2–1)	—	8,556	11–9	W3
21	April 25	Rangers	1:10 pm	8–4	**Kopech** (2–0)	Arihara (2–2)	—	9,285	12–9	W4
22	April 27	Tigers	7:10 pm	2–5	Ureña (1–3)	**Giolito** (1–2)	Soto (3)	9,445	12–10	L1
—	April 28	Tigers	7:10 pm	Postponed (Rain, Makeup April 29)						
23	April 29 (1)	Tigers	4:10 pm	3–1 (7)	**Rodón** (4–0)	Mize (1–3)	**Hendriks** (5)	N/A	13–10	W1
24	April 29 (2)	Tigers	8:15 pm	11–0 (7)	**Cease** (1–0)	Boyd (2–3)	—	7,628	14–10	W2
25	April 30	Indians	7:10 pm	3–5	Bieber (3–2)	**Keuchel** (1–1)	Clase (5)	9,405	14–11	L1

May: 19–10 (Home: 12–4; Away: 7–6)

#	Date	Opponent	Time (CT)	Score	Win	Loss	Save	Attendance	Record	Streak
26	May 1	Indians	3:05 pm	7–3	**Lynn** (2–1)	McKenzie (0–1)	—	9,451	15–11	W1
27	May 2	Indians	1:10 pm	0–5	Plesac (2–3)	**Giolito** (1–3)	—	9,471	15–12	L1
28	May 4	@ Reds	5:40 pm	9–0	**Cease** (2–0)	Hoffman (2–2)	—	10,209	16–12	W1
29	May 5	@ Reds	11:40 am	0–1 (10)	Sims (1–1)	**Hendriks** (1–1)	—	10,247	16–13	L1
30	May 7	@ Royals	7:10 pm	3–0	**Rodón** (5–0)	Keller (2–4)	**Hendriks** (6)	16,011	17–13	W1
31	May 8	@ Royals	6:10 pm	9–1	**Lynn** (3–1)	Lynch (0–1)	—	15,895	18–13	W2
32	May 9	@ Royals	1:10 pm	9–3	**Giolito** (2–3)	Minor (2–2)	—	12,102	19–13	W3
33	May 11	Twins	7:10 pm	9–3	**Crochet** (1–2)	Alcalá (0–1)	—	7,962	20–13	W4
34	May 12	Twins	7:10 pm	13–8	**Keuchel** (2–1)	Happ (2–1)	—	8,393	21–13	W5
35	May 13	Twins	1:10 pm	4–2	**Lynn** (4–1)	Pineda (2–2)	**Hendriks** (7)	8,188	22–13	W6
36	May 14 (1)	Royals	1:10 pm	2–6 (7)	Keller (3–4)	**Giolito** (2–4)	—	8,574	22–14	L1
37	May 14 (2)	Royals	7:10 pm	3–1 (7)	**Heuer** (3–1)	Junis (1–3)	**Hendriks** (8)	9,823	23–14	W1
38	May 15	Royals	6:10 pm	1–5	Minor (3–2)	**Rodón** (5–1)	—	9,886	23–15	L1
39	May 16	Royals	1:10 pm	4–3	**Foster** (2–1)	Davis (0–2)	—	9,928	24–15	W1
40	May 17	@ Twins	6:40 pm	16–4	**Keuchel** (3–1)	Happ (2–2)	—	8,431	25–15	W2
41	May 18	@ Twins	6:40 pm	4–5	Rogers (1–2)	**Bummer** (0–2)	—	9,504	25–16	L1
42	May 19	@ Twins	12:10 pm	2–1	**Giolito** (3–4)	Shoemaker (2–5)	**Hendriks** (9)	8,608	26–16	W1
43	May 21	@ Yankees	6:05 pm	1–2	Chapman (3–0)	**Marshall** (0–2)	—	14,011	26–17	L1
44	May 22	@ Yankees	12:05 pm	0–7	Cole (6–2)	**Cease** (2–1)	—	14,665	26–18	L2
45	May 23	@ Yankees	12:05 pm	4–5	Chapman (4–0)	**Bummer** (0–3)	—	14,007	26–19	L3
46	May 24	Cardinals	7:10 pm	5–1	**Lynn** (5–1)	Kim (1–2)	—	14,629	27–19	W1
47	May 25	Cardinals	7:10 pm	8–3	**Giolito** (4–4)	Flaherty (8–1)	**Hendriks** (10)	16,380	28–19	W2
48	May 26	Cardinals	1:10 pm	0–4	Gant (4–3)	**Rodón** (5–2)	—	14,791	28–20	L1
49	May 27	Orioles	7:10 pm	5–1	**Cease** (3–1)	Tate (0–2)	—	9,671	29–20	W1
—	May 28	Orioles	7:10 pm	Postponed (Rain, Makeup May 29)						
50	May 29 (1)	Orioles	1:10 pm	7–4 (7)	**Keuchel** (4–1)	Harvey (3–6)	**Hendriks** (11)	N/A	30–20	W2
51	May 29 (2)	Orioles	4:35 pm	3–1 (7)	**Lynn** (6–1)	Means (4–1)	**Hendriks** (12)	20,029	31–20	W3
52	May 30	Orioles	1:10 pm	3–1	**Giolito** (5–4)	Tate (0–3)	**Hendriks** (13)	21,067	32–20	W4
53	May 31 (1)	@ Indians	2:10 pm	8–6 (8)	**Heuer** (4–1)	Karinchak (2–2)	**Bummer** (1)	N/A	33–20	W5
54	May 31 (2)	@ Indians	5:35 pm	1–3 (7)	Maton (1–0)	**Lambert** (0–1)	Clase (9)	10,726	33–21	L1

June: 14–11 (Home: 10–5; Away: 4–6)

#	Date	Opponent	Time (CT)	Score	Win	Loss	Save	Attendance	Record	Streak
55	June 1	@ Indians	5:10 pm	5–6	Bieber (6–3)	**Cease** (3–2)	Karinchak (7)	7,132	33–22	L2
—	June 2	@ Indians	12:10 pm	Postponed (Rain, Makeup September 23)						
56	June 3	Tigers	7:10 pm	4–1	**Lynn** (7–1)	Mize (3–4)	**Hendriks** (14)	12,845	34–22	W1
57	June 4	Tigers	7:10 pm	9–8	**Hendriks** (2–1)	Cisnero (0–3)	—	21,637	35–22	W2
58	June 5	Tigers	1:10 pm	3–4	Skubal (3–7)	**Giolito** (5–5)	Cisnero (1)	21,719	35–23	L1
59	June 6	Tigers	1:10 pm	3–0	**Cease** (4–2)	Ureña (2–5)	**Hendriks** (15)	20,068	36–23	W1
60	June 8	Blue Jays	7:10 pm	6–1	**Crochet** (2–2)	Thornton (1–2)	—	12,761	37–23	W2
61	June 9	Blue Jays	7:10 pm	2–6	Chatwood (1–2)	**Bummer** (0–4)	—	14,438	37–24	L1
62	June 10	Blue Jays	7:10 pm	5–2	**Keuchel** (5–1)	Ryu (5–4)	**Hendriks** (16)	16,903	38–24	W1
63	June 11	@ Tigers	6:10 pm	5–4 (10)	**Hendriks** (3–1)	Cisnero (0–4)	**Bummer** (2)	14,163	39–24	W2
64	June 12	@ Tigers	3:10 pm	15–2	**Cease** (5–2)	Ureña (2–6)	—	15,913	40–24	W3
65	June 13	@ Tigers	12:10 pm	4–1	**Rodón** (6–2)	Alexander (0–1)	**Hendriks** (17)	14,093	41–24	W4
66	June 14	Rays	7:10 pm	2–5	Feyereisen (3–2)	**Lynn** (7–2)	Fairbanks (3)	18,024	41–25	L1
67	June 15	Rays	7:10 pm	3–0	**Keuchel** (6–1)	McClanahan (2–2)	**Hendriks** (18)	19,259	42–25	W1
68	June 16	Rays	1:10 pm	8–7 (10)	**Burr** (1–0)	Fairbanks (1–1)	—	20,098	43–25	W2
69	June 17	@ Astros	7:10 pm	2–10	Urquidy (5–3)	**Cease** (5–3)	—	21,795	43–26	L1
70	June 18	@ Astros	7:10 pm	1–2	Pressly (4–1)	**Crochet** (2–3)	—	30,898	43–27	L2
71	June 19	@ Astros	6:15 pm	3–7	Valdez (4–0)	**Lynn** (7–3)	—	35,210	43–28	L3
72	June 20	@ Astros	1:10 pm	2–8	McCullers Jr. (4–1)	**Keuchel** (6–2)	—	39,821	43–29	L4
73	June 22	@ Pirates	6:05 pm	3–6	Bednar (1–1)	**Crochet** (2–4)	Rodríguez (9)	9,847	43–30	L5
74	June 23	@ Pirates	11:35 am	4–3	**Cease** (6–3)	De Jong (0–2)	**Hendriks** (19)	10,406	44–30	W1
75	June 25	Mariners	7:10 pm	3–9	Kikuchi (5–3)	**Rodón** (6–3)	—	32,189	44–31	L1
—	June 26	Mariners	1:10 pm	Suspended (Rain, makeup: June 27)						
76	June 27 (1)	Mariners	1:10 pm	2–3	Sewald (5–2)	**Hendriks** (3–2)	Graveman (7)	30,017	44–32	L2
77	June 27 (2)	Mariners	4:15 pm	7–5 (7)	**Bummer** (1–4)	Dugger (0–2)	**Hendriks** (20)	30,017	45–32	W1
—	June 28	Twins	7:10 pm	Postponed (Rain, Makeup July 19)						
78	June 29	Twins	7:10 pm	7–6	**Giolito** (6–5)	Maeda (3–3)	**Hendriks** (21)	17,382	46–32	W2
79	June 30	Twins	7:10 pm	13–3	**Cease** (7–3)	Ober (0–1)	—	16,803	47–32	W3

July: 14–12 (Home: 6–4; Away: 8–8)

#	Date	Opponent	Time (CT)	Score	Win	Loss	Save	Attendance	Record	Streak
80	July 1	Twins	1:10 pm	8–5	**Kopech** (3–0)	Alcalá (1–3)	—	24,944	48–32	W4
81	July 2	@ Tigers	6:10 pm	8–2	**Lynn** (8–3)	Mize (5–5)	—	18,185	49–32	W5
82	July 3	@ Tigers	3:10 pm	5–11	Skubal (5–7)	**Keuchel** (6–3)	—	17,230	49–33	L1
83	July 4	@ Tigers	12:10 pm	5–6	Alexander (1–1)	**Giolito** (6–6)	Cisnero (4)	15,342	49–34	L2
84	July 5	@ Twins	6:10 pm	5–8	Ober (1–1)	**Cease** (7–4)	Robles (8)	20,321	49–35	L3
85	July 6	@ Twins	7:10 pm	4–1	**Rodón** (7–3)	Berríos (7–3)	**Hendriks** (22)	18,437	50–35	W1
86	July 7	@ Twins	12:10 pm	6–1	**Lynn** (9–3)	Pineda (3–5)	—	19,664	51–35	W2
87	July 9	@ Orioles	6:05 pm	12–1	**Keuchel** (7–3)	López (2–12)	—	12,077	52–35	W3
88	July 10	@ Orioles	3:05 pm	8–3	**Giolito** (7–6)	Eshelman (0–2)	**Hendriks** (23)	26,391	53–35	W4
89	July 11	@ Orioles	12:05 pm	7–5 (10)	**Hendriks** (4–2)	Wells (2–1)	**Foster** (1)	11,600	54–35	W5
—	July 13	**91st All-Star Game in Denver, CO**								
90	July 16	Astros	7:10 pm	1–7	McCullers Jr. (7–2)	**Cease** (7–5)	—	34,516	54–36	L1
91	July 17	Astros	6:15 pm	10–1	**Giolito** (8–6)	Odorizzi (3–5)	—	34,304	55–36	W1
92	July 18	Astros	1:10 pm	4–0	**Rodón** (8–3)	Valdez (5–2)	—	34,148	56–36	W2
93	July 19 (1)	Twins	4:10 pm	2–3 (8)	Duffey (2–2)	**Crochet** (2–5)	Robles (10)	N/A	56–37	L1
94	July 19 (2)	Twins	7:35 pm	5–3 (7)	**Bummer** (2–4)	Berríos (7–4)	—	18,272	57–37	W1
95	July 20	Twins	7:10 pm	9–5	**Burr** (2–0)	Alcalá (2–4)	—	17,703	58–37	W2
96	July 21	Twins	7:10 pm	2–7	Pineda (4–5)	**Cease** (7–6)	—	25,600	58–38	L1
97	July 23	@ Brewers	7:10 pm	1–7	Houser (6–5)	**Giolito** (8–7)	—	32,714	58–39	L2
98	July 24	@ Brewers	6:10 pm	1–6	Burnes (6–4)	**Rodón** (8–4)	—	41,686	58–40	L3
99	July 25	@ Brewers	6:08 pm	3–1	**Lynn** (10–3)	Woodruff (7–5)	**Hendriks** (24)	36,887	59–40	W1
100	July 26	@ Royals	7:10 pm	3–4	Minor (8–8)	**Keuchel** (7–4)	Barlow (6)	12,384	59–41	L1
101	July 27	@ Royals	7:10 pm	5–3	**López** (1–0)	Zimmer (4–1)	**Hendriks** (25)	14,298	60–41	W1
102	July 28	@ Royals	7:10 pm	2–3 (10)	Barlow (3–3)	**Burr** (2–1)	—	13,626	60–42	L1
103	July 29	@ Royals	1:10 pm	0–5	Hernández (2–1)	**Rodón** (8–5)	—	11,210	60–43	L2
104	July 30	Indians	7:10 pm	6–4	**Ruiz** (1–1)	Karinchak (7–3)	**Hendriks** (26)	36,123	61–43	W1
105	July 31	Indians	6:10 pm	11–12	Garza (1–0)	**Kopech** (3–1)	Clase (13)	35,866	61–44	L1

August: 16–12 (Home: 9–6; Away: 7–6)

#	Date	Opponent	Time (CT)	Score	Win	Loss	Save	Attendance	Record	Streak
106	August 1	Indians	1:10 pm	2–1	**Hendriks** (5–2)	Wittgren (2–4)	—	34,344	62–44	W1
107	August 3	Royals	7:10 pm	7–1	**Cease** (8–6)	Bubic (3–5)	—	19,369	63–44	W2
108	August 4	Royals	7:10 pm	1–9	Hernández (3–1)	**Giolito** (8–8)	—	22,793	63–45	L1
109	August 5	Royals	7:10 pm	2–3	Lynch (2–3)	**Keuchel** (7–5)	Brentz (1)	23,589	63–46	L2
110	August 6	@ Cubs	1:20 pm	8–6 (10)	**Hendriks** (6–2)	Rodríguez (0–2)	—	39,539	64–46	W1
111	August 7	@ Cubs	1:20 pm	4–0	**Rodón** (9–5)	Alzolay (4–12)	—	40,077	65–46	W2
112	August 8	@ Cubs	6:09 pm	9–3	**Cease** (9–6)	Davies (6–9)	—	39,412	66–46	W3
113	August 9	@ Twins	7:10 pm	11–1	**Giolito** (9–8)	Burrows (0–1)	—	17,858	67–46	W4
114	August 10	@ Twins	7:10 pm	3–4	Jax (3–1)	**Keuchel** (7–6)	Colomé (6)	18,302	67–47	L1
115	August 11	@ Twins	12:10 pm	0–1	Thielbar (4–0)	**Ruiz** (1–2)	Colomé (7)	22,370	67–48	L2
116	August 12†	Yankees (Field of Dreams game)	6:00 pm	9–8	**Hendriks** (7–2)	Britton (0–1)	—	7,832	68–48	W1
117	August 14	Yankees	6:10 pm	5–7 (10)	Green (7–5)	**Hendriks** (7–3)	Abreu (1)	38,477	68–49	L1
118	August 15	Yankees	1:10 pm	3–5	Cortés Jr. (1–1)	**Giolito** (9–9)	Peralta (4)	37,696	68–50	L2
119	August 16	Athletics	7:10 pm	5–2	**Keuchel** (8–6)	Montas (9–9)	**Hendriks** (27)	19,410	69–50	W1
120	August 17	Athletics	7:10 pm	9–0	**López** (2–0)	Bassitt (12–4)	—	21,025	70–50	W2
121	August 18	Athletics	7:10 pm	3–2	**Crochet** (3–5)	Blackburn (0–1)	**Hendriks** (28)	22,780	71–50	W3
122	August 19	Athletics	1:10 pm	4–5	Irvin (9–11)	**Kopech** (3–2)	Trivino (20)	23,853	71–51	L1
123	August 20	@ Rays	6:10 pm	7–5 (11)	**Hendriks** (8–3)	Kittredge (8–2)	**Tepera** (2)	13,178	72–51	W1
124	August 21	@ Rays	12:10 pm	4–8	Patiño (3–3)	**Keuchel** (8–7)	McHugh (1)	22,275	72–52	L1
125	August 22	@ Rays	12:10 pm	0–9	Armstrong (1–0)	**López** (2–1)	Fleming (1)	16,696	72–53	L2
126	August 23	@ Blue Jays	6:07 pm	1–2	Mayza (3–1)	**Kimbrel** (2–4)	Romano (12)	14,640	72–54	L3
127	August 24	@ Blue Jays	6:07 pm	5–2	**Cease** (10–6)	Berríos (8–7)	**Hendriks** (29)	14,553	73–54	W1
128	August 25	@ Blue Jays	6:07 pm	1–3	Mayza (4–1)	**Bummer** (2–5)	Romano (13)	14,276	73–55	L1
129	August 26	@ Blue Jays	2:07 pm	10–7	**Rodón** (10–5)	Ryu (12–7)	**Kimbrel** (24)	14,958	74–55	W1
130	August 27	Cubs	7:10 pm	17–13	**López** (3–1)	Sampson (0–1)	—	37,892	75–55	W2
131	August 28	Cubs	6:10 pm	0–7	Mills (6–6)	**Lynn** (10–4)	—	38,668	75–56	L1
132	August 29	Cubs	1:10 pm	13–1	**Cease** (11–6)	Hendricks (14–6)	—	38,565	76–56	W1
133	August 31	Pirates	7:10 pm	4–2	**Kopech** (4–2)	Wilson (2–6)	**Hendriks** (30)	19,221	77–56	W2
†The White Sox were the home team against the Yankees at the Field of Dreams movie site in the inaugural MLB at Field of Dreams game.

September/October: 16–13 (Home: 8–4; Away: 8–9)

#	Date	Opponent	Time (CT)	Score	Win	Loss	Save	Attendance	Record	Streak
134	September 1	Pirates	7:10 pm	6–3	**Rodón** (11–5)	Kranick (1–3)	**Hendriks** (31)	19,231	78–56	W3
135	September 3	@ Royals	7:10 pm	2–7	Hernández (5–1)	**Keuchel** (8–8)	—	14,210	78–57	L1
136	September 4	@ Royals	6:10 pm	10–7	**Kimbrel** (3–4)	Lynch (4–4)	**Hendriks** (32)	18,800	79–57	W1
137	September 5	@ Royals	1:10 pm	0–6	Singer (4–9)	**Cease** (11–7)	—	19,696	79–58	L1
138	September 7	@ Athletics	8:40 pm	6–3	**Lambert** (1–1)	Puk (0–3)	**Hendriks** (33)	4,556	80–58	W1
139	September 8	@ Athletics	8:40 pm	1–5	Montas (12–9)	**Keuchel** (8–9)	—	8,147	80–59	L1
140	September 9	@ Athletics	2:37 pm	1–3	Manaea (9–9)	**López** (3–2)	Chafin (3)	5,078	80–60	L2
141	September 10	Red Sox	7:10 pm	4–3	**Rodón** (12–5)	Houck (0–4)	**Hendriks** (34)	34,365	81–60	W1
142	September 11	Red Sox	6:10 pm	8–9 (10)	Whitlock (8–3)	**Wright** (0–1)	Taylor (1)	37,854	81–61	L1
143	September 12	Red Sox	1:10 pm	2–1	**Kimbrel** (4–4)	Whitlock (8–4)	—	36,178	82–61	W1
144	September 14	Angels	7:10 pm	9–3	**Bummer** (3–5)	Naughton (0–2)	—	21,848	83–61	W2
145	September 15	Angels	7:10 pm	2–3	Mayers (5–5)	**Kopech** (3–4)	Iglesias (32)	26,505	83–62	L1
146	September 16	Angels	1:10 pm	3–9	Cobb (8–3)	**López** (3–3)	—	27,098	83–63	L2
147	September 17	@ Rangers	7:05 pm	8–0	**Cease** (12–7)	Hearn (6–5)	—	28,288	84–63	W1
148	September 18	@ Rangers	6:05 pm	1–2	Anderson (1–2)	**Lynn** (10–5)	Barlow (7)	31,121	84–64	L1
149	September 19	@ Rangers	1:35 pm	7–2	**Giolito** (10–9)	Lyles (9–12)	—	24,918	85–64	W1
150	September 20	@ Tigers	5:40 pm	3–4	Hutchison (2–1)	**Kimbrel** (4–5)	Lange (1)	12,884	85–65	L1
151	September 21	@ Tigers	12:10 pm	3–5	Garcia (3–2)	**Fry** (0–1)	Fulmer (11)	10,585	85–66	L2
—	September 22	@ Tigers	12:10 pm	Postponed (Rain, Makeup September 27)						
152	September 23 (1)	@ Indians	12:10 pm	7–2 (7)	**Bummer** (4–5)	Civale (11–5)	—	11,851	86–66	W1
153	September 23 (2)	@ Indians	5:10 pm	3–5 (7)	Clase (4–5)	**Ruiz** (1–3)	—	11,336	86–67	L1
154	September 24	@ Indians	6:10 pm	1–0	**Cease** (13–7)	Stephan (3–1)	**Hendriks** (35)	18,756	87–67	W1
155	September 25	@ Indians	6:15 pm	0–6	Morgan (4–7)	**Lynn** (10–6)	—	24,082	87–68	L1
156	September 26	@ Indians	12:10 pm	5–2	**Giolito** (11–9)	McKenzie (5–8)	**Hendriks** (36)	21,957	88–68	W1
157	September 27	@ Tigers	12:10 pm	8–7	**Keuchel** (9–9)	Manning (4–7)	**Hendriks** (37)	11,044	89–68	W2
158	September 28	Reds	7:10 pm	7–1	**López** (4–3)	O'Brien (0–1)	—	25,242	90–68	W3
159	September 29	Reds	7:10 pm	6–1	**Rodón** (13–5)	Gray (7–9)	—	23,018	91–68	W4
160	October 1	Tigers	7:10 pm	8–1	**Lynn** (11–6)	Peralta (4–5)	—	30,729	92–68	W5
161	October 2	Tigers	6:10 pm	5–4	**Bummer** (5–5)	Funkhouser (7–4)	**Hendriks** (38)	36,320	93–68	W6
162	October 3	Tigers	2:10 pm	2–5	Jiménez (6–1)	**López** (4–4)	—	30,722	93–69	L1

Legend: = Win = Loss = Postponement
Bold = White Sox team member

=== Detailed records ===
**American League**
Opponent	Total	Home	Away	RS	RA
**American League Central**
**Chicago White Sox**	–	–	–	–	–
Cleveland Indians	10–9	5–5	5–4	81	74
Detroit Tigers	12–7	7–3	5–4	106	71
Kansas City Royals	9–10	4–5	5–5	72	71
Minnesota Twins	13–6	8–2	5–4	123	71
Total	44–32	24–15	20–17	382	287
**American League East**
Opponent	Total	Home	Away	RS	RA
Baltimore Orioles	7–0	4–0	3–0	45	16
Boston Red Sox	4–3	2–1	2–2	30	34
New York Yankees	1–5	1–2	0–3	22	34
Tampa Bay Rays	3–3	2–1	1–2	24	34
Toronto Blue Jays	4–3	2–1	2–2	30	23
Total	19–14	11–5	8–9	151	141
**American League West**
Opponent	Total	Home	Away	RS	RA
Houston Astros	2–5	2–1	0–4	23	35
Los Angeles Angels	2–5	1–2	1–3	36	39
Oakland Athletics	4–3	3–1	1–2	29	20
Seattle Mariners	3–3	1–2	2–1	32	29
Texas Rangers	5–1	3–0	2–1	35	16
Total	16–17	10–6	6–11	155	139

**National League Central**
Opponent	Total	Home	Away	RS	RA
Chicago Cubs	5–1	2–1	3–0	51	30
Cincinnati Reds	3–1	2–0	1–1	22	3
Milwaukee Brewers	1–2	–	1–2	5	14
Pittsburgh Pirates	3–1	2–0	1–1	17	14
St. Louis Cardinals	2–1	2–1	–	13	8
Total	14–6	8–2	6–4	108	69

== Postseason ==
=== Game log ===
2021 White Sox postseason game log
American League Division Series (1–3) (best of 5)

#	Date	Opponent	Score	Win	Loss	Save	Time (CT)	Record	Attendance	Box
1	October 7	@ Astros	1–6	McCullers Jr. (1–0)	Lynn (0–1)	—	3:07 pm	0–1	40,497	L1
2	October 8	@ Astros	4–9	Stanek (1–0)	Bummer (0–1)	—	1:07 pm	0–2	41,315	L2
3	October 10	Astros	12–6	Kopech (1–0)	García (0–1)	—	7:07 pm	1–2	40,288	W1
—	October 11	Astros	Postponed (rain, makeup October 12)							
4	October 12	Astros	1–10	García (1–1)	Rodón (0–1)	—	1:07 pm	1–3	40,170	L1

=== Postseason rosters ===
Playoff rosters
American League Division Series

- Pitchers: 27 Lucas Giolito 31 Liam Hendriks 33 Lance Lynn 34 Michael Kopech 39 Aaron Bummer 40 Reynaldo López 45 Garrett Crochet 46 Craig Kimbrel 51 Ryan Tepera 55 Carlos Rodón 66 José Ruiz 84 Dylan Cease
- Catchers: 21 Zack Collins 24 Yasmani Grandal
- Infielders: 7 Tim Anderson 10 Yoán Moncada 12 César Hernández 20 Danny Mendick 28 Leury García 32 Gavin Sheets 79 José Abreu
- Outfielders: 0 Billy Hamilton 15 Adam Engel 25 Andrew Vaughn 74 Eloy Jiménez 88 Luis Robert

== Roster ==
2021 Chicago White Sox
Roster
Pitchers: 39 Aaron Bummer; 62 Zack Burdi; 61 Ryan Burr; 84 Dylan Cease; 45 Garrett Crochet; 63 Matt Foster; 57 Jace Fry; 27 Lucas Giolito; 31 Liam Hendriks; 65 Codi Heuer; 60 Dallas Keuchel; 46 Craig Kimbrel; 34 Michael Kopech; 58 Jimmy Lambert; 40 Reynaldo López; 33 Lance Lynn; 43 Evan Marshall; 64 Alex McRae; 55 Carlos Rodón; 66 José Ruiz; 53 Jonathan Stiever; 51 Ryan Tepera; 48 Mike Wright	Catchers: 21 Zack Collins; 24 Yasmani Grandal; 73 Yermín Mercedes; 44 Seby Zavala; Infielders: 79 José Abreu; 7 Tim Anderson; 30 Jake Burger; 5 Romy González; 12 César Hernández; 1 Nick Madrigal; 20 Danny Mendick; 10 Yoán Moncada	Outfielders: 12 Adam Eaton; 15 Adam Engel; 28 Leury García; 17 Luis González; 18 Brian Goodwin; 0 Billy Hamilton; 74 Eloy Jiménez; 23 Jake Lamb; 88 Luis Robert; 32 Gavin Sheets; 25 Andrew Vaughn; 5 Nick Williams	Manager: 22 Tony La Russa; Coaches: 8 Daryl Boston (first base); 41 Miguel Cairo (bench); 37 Howie Clark (assistant hitting); 49 Shelley Duncan (analytics coordinator); 98 Miguel González (bullpen catcher); 29 Curt Hasler (bullpen); 52 Ethan Katz (pitching); 47 Joe McEwing (third base); 26 Frank Menechino (hitting); 38 Jerry Narron (major league instructor); 96 Luis Sierra (bullpen catcher)

== Player stats ==
=== Batting ===
Note: G = Games played; AB = At bats; R = Runs scored; H = Hits; 2B = Doubles; 3B = Triples; HR = Home runs; RBI = Runs batted in; AVG = Batting average; OBP = On-base percentage; SB = Stolen bases

Player	G	AB	R	H	2B	3B	HR	RBI	AVG	OBP	SB
Jose Abreu	152	659	86	148	30	2	30	117	.261	.351	1
Tim Anderson	123	551	94	163	29	2	17	61	.309	.338	18
Jake Burger	15	38	5	10	3	1	1	3	.263	.333	0
Dylan Cease	3	8	1	3	1	0	0	0	.375	.375	0
Zack Collins	78	195	25	41	13	0	4	26	.210	.330	1
Adam Eaton	58	189	33	38	8	2	5	28	.201	.298	2
Adam Engel	39	123	21	31	9	0	7	18	.252	.336	7
Leury Garcia	126	415	60	111	22	4	5	54	.267	.335	6
Lucas Giolito	2	4	0	1	0	0	0	0	.250	.250	0
Luis Gonzalez	6	8	2	2	2	0	0	0	.250	.455	0
Romy Gonzalez	10	32	4	8	3	0	0	2	.250	.273	0
Brian Goodwin	72	235	33	52	10	1	8	29	.221	.319	1
Yasmani Grandal	93	279	60	67	9	0	23	62	.240	.420	0
Billy Hamilton	71	127	23	28	8	3	2	11	.220	.242	9
Cesar Hernandez	53	194	24	45	4	0	3	15	.232	.309	1
Eloy Jimenez	55	213	23	53	10	0	10	37	.249	.303	0
Dallas Keuchel	1	2	0	0	0	0	0	0	.000	.000	0
Michael Kopech	4	1	0	0	0	0	0	0	.000	.000	0
Jake Lamb	43	113	20	24	2	0	6	13	.212	.321	0
Lance Lynn	2	5	0	1	0	0	0	2	.200	.200	0
Nick Madrigal	54	200	30	61	10	4	2	21	.305	.349	1
Danny Mendick	71	164	14	36	5	0	2	20	.220	.303	0
Yermin Mercedes	68	240	26	65	9	1	7	37	.271	.328	0
Yoan Moncada	144	520	74	137	33	1	14	61	.263	.375	3
Luis Robert	68	275	42	93	22	1	13	43	.338	.378	6
Carlos Rodon	2	3	0	0	0	0	0	0	.000	.000	0
José Ruiz	4	1	0	0	0	0	0	0	.000	.000	0
Gavin Sheets	54	160	23	40	8	0	11	34	.250	.324	0
Andrew Vaughn	127	417	56	98	22	0	15	48	.235	.309	1
Nick Williams	4	10	2	0	0	0	0	0	.000	.231	0
Seby Zavala	37	93	15	17	3	0	5	15	.183	.240	0
Team totals	162	5357	796	1373	275	22	190	757	.256	.336	57

=== Pitching ===
Note: W = Wins; L = Losses; ERA = Earned run average; WHIP = Walks and hits per inning pitched; G = Games pitched; GS = Games started; SV = Saves; IP = Innings pitched; R = Total runs allowed; ER = Earned runs allowed; BB = Walks allowed; K = Strikeouts

Player	W	L	ERA	WHIP	G	GS	SV	IP	R	ER	BB	K
Aaron Bummer	5	5	3.51	1.26	62	0	2	56.1	28	22	29	75
Zack Burdi	0	0	6.00	1.89	6	0	0	9.0	7	6	4	6
Ryan Burr	2	1	2.45	1.33	34	1	0	36.2	11	10	21	33
Dylan Cease	13	7	3.95	1.24	32	32	0	165.2	77	72	68	226
Garrett Crochet	3	5	2.82	1.27	54	0	0	54.1	22	17	27	65
Matt Foster	2	1	6.00	1.43	37	0	1	39.0	27	26	13	40
Jace Fry	0	1	10.80	2.40	6	0	0	6.2	8	8	6	3
Lucas Giolito	11	9	3.53	1.10	31	31	0	178.2	74	70	52	201
Romy Gonzalez	0	0	0.00	0.00	1	0	0	0.1	0	0	0	1
Liam Hendriks	8	3	2.54	0.73	69	0	38	71.0	23	20	7	113
Codi Heuer	4	1	5.12	1.42	40	0	0	38.2	22	22	10	39
Dallas Keuchel	9	9	5.28	1.53	32	30	0	162.0	105	95	59	95
Craig Kimbrel	2	2	5.09	1.21	24	0	1	23.0	13	13	10	36
Michael Kopech	4	3	3.50	1.12	44	4	0	69.1	27	27	22	103
Jimmy Lambert	1	1	6.23	1.70	4	3	0	13.0	9	9	6	10
Reynaldo Lopez	4	4	3.43	0.95	20	9	0	57.2	27	22	13	55
Lance Lynn	11	6	2.69	1.07	28	28	0	157.0	52	47	45	176
Evan Marshall	0	2	5.60	1.35	27	0	0	27.1	17	17	9	26
Alex McRae	0	0	4.50	2.00	2	0	0	2.0	1	1	1	1
Danny Mendick	0	0	0.00	1.00	1	0	0	1.0	0	0	0	1
Yermin Mercedes	0	0	9.00	5.00	1	0	0	1.0	1	1	2	0
Carlos Rodon	13	5	2.37	0.95	24	24	0	132.2	39	35	36	185
José Ruiz	1	3	3.05	1.16	59	0	0	65.0	26	22	25	63
Jonathan Stiever	0	0	inf	inf	1	0	0	0.0	3	3	0	0
Ryan Tepera	0	0	2.50	1.11	22	0	1	18.0	5	5	7	24
Mike Wright	0	1	5.50	1.55	13	0	0	18.0	12	11	11	11
Team totals	93	69	3.73	1.20	162	162	43	1403.1	636	581	474	1588

== Awards and honors ==
Yermín Mercedes was named the AL Player of the Week on April 5 after going 9-for-14 with a .643 batting average, a 1.643 OPS, 1 home run, and 6 RBIs. Mercedes was then named the Rookie of the Month in the month of April for the number of games played.

Liam Hendriks was named the AL Reliever of the Month in the month of May after not allowing an earned run in 11 2/3 innings pitched for the White Sox while striking out 19 batters and recording eight saves in eight opportunities. Hendriks later earned AL Reliever of the Month honors again for September/October after going 8-for-8 in save opportunities while only allowing six hits, no walks, and striking out 21 batters in 13 2/3 innings. For his efforts, Hendriks won the Mariano Rivera AL Reliever of the Year Award for the second year in a row while becoming the second White Sox player to win reliever of the year and the first since Bobby Thigpen in 1990.

José Abreu was named the AL Player of the Month in August. Abreu batted .330/.382/.661 hitting 10 Home Runs and 25 RBI's with an OPS of 1.043.

Despite not having a great season stat-wise, Dallas Keuchel won his 5th Fielding Bible Award for the pitcher position and passed former White Sox pitcher Mark Buehrle for most Fielding Bible Awards won by a pitcher since the Award was first handed out in 2006. Keuchel also won his 5th Gold Glove Award. Keuchel had a career-high 12 defensive runs saved, most by a pitcher since Buehrle had 12 in 2012.

== Farm system ==
Level	Team	League	Manager
AAA	Charlotte Knights	Triple-A East	Wes Helms
AA	Birmingham Barons	Double-A South	Justin Jirschele
High-A	Winston-Salem Dash	High-A East	Ryan Newman
A	Kannapolis Cannon Ballers	Low-A East	Guillermo Quiróz
Rookie	ACL White Sox	Arizona Complex League	Mike Gellinger
Rookie	DSL White Sox	Dominican Summer League	
