= Cal Quantrill =

Canadian baseball player (born 1995)

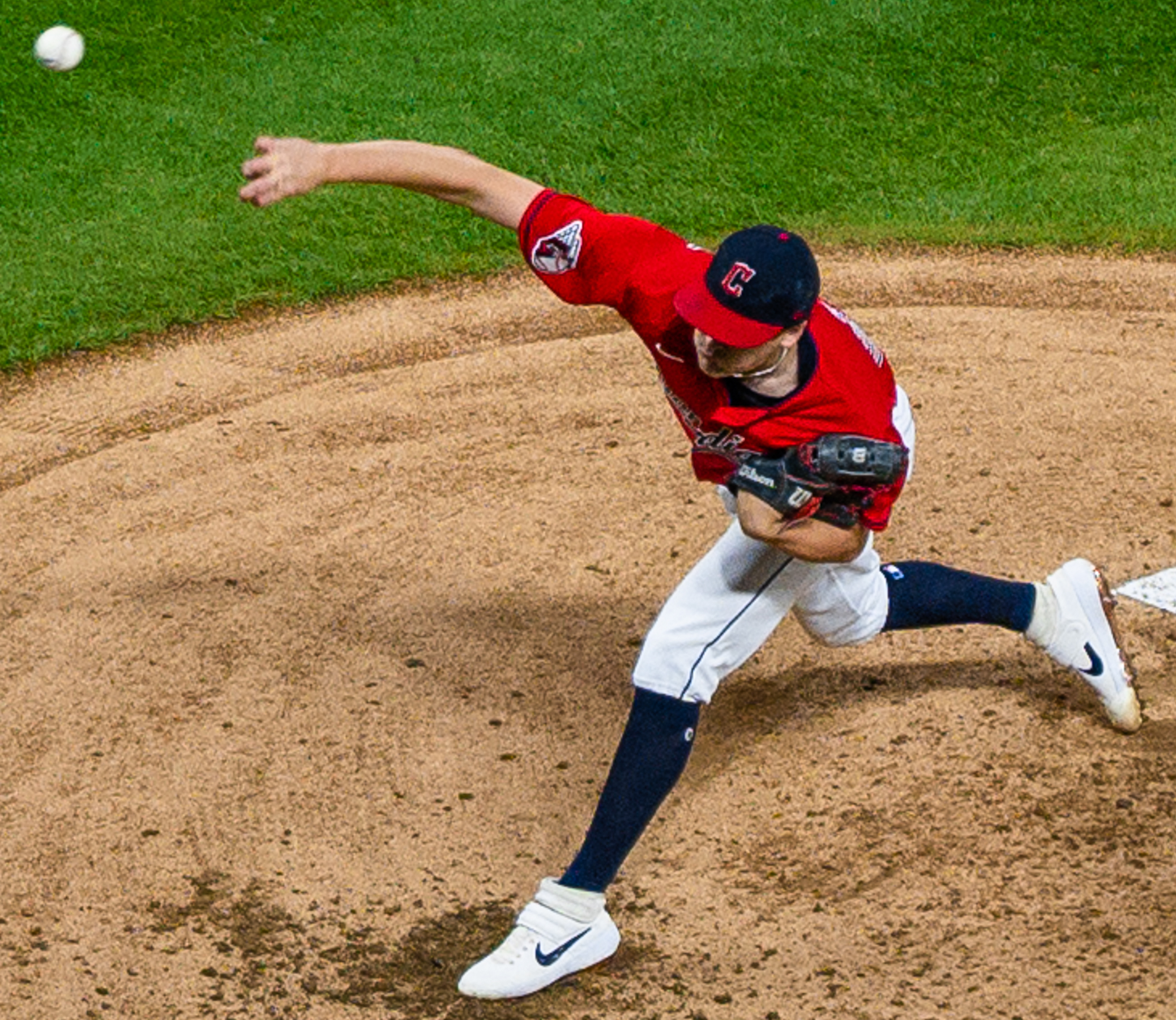
- Quantrill with the Cleveland Guardians in 2022

Free agent
- Pitcher
- Born: February 10, 1995 (age 31); Port Hope, Ontario, Canada
- Bats: Left Throws: Right

MLB debut
- May 1, 2019, for the San Diego Padres

MLB statistics (through 2026 season)
- Win–loss record: 56–51
- Earned run average: 4.17
- Strikeouts: 703
- Stats at Baseball Reference

Teams
- San Diego Padres (2019–2020); Cleveland Indians / Guardians (2020–2023); Colorado Rockies (2024); Miami Marlins (2025); Atlanta Braves (2025); Texas Rangers (2026)

Career highlights and awards
- Pitched an immaculate inning on May 18, 2025
Medals
Men's baseball
Representing Canada
18U Baseball World Championship
Silver medal – second place	2012 Seoul	Team

Cal Paul Quantrill (born February 10, 1995) is a Canadian professional baseball pitcher who is a free agent. He has played in Major League Baseball (MLB) for the San Diego Padres, Cleveland Indians / Guardians, Colorado Rockies, Miami Marlins, Atlanta Braves, and Texas Rangers. Quantrill played college baseball for the Stanford Cardinal. He was selected in the first round of the 2016 MLB draft by the Padres, and made his MLB debut with them in 2019.

== Amateur career ==
Quantrill attended Trinity College School in Port Hope, Ontario. He was a four-time varsity letterman in baseball, and also lettered in hockey and volleyball. He was drafted by the New York Yankees in the 26th round of the 2013 Major League Baseball draft, but did not sign.

Quantrill chose to attend Stanford University to play college baseball for the Stanford Cardinal. In his freshman season, he made 17 starts for Stanford, including their game on opening day, becoming the first freshman to start opening day for Stanford since Mike Mussina in 1988. Quantrill pitched to a 7–5 win–loss record, 2.68 earned run average (ERA), and 98 strikeouts in 110 2/3 innings pitched. In his sophomore year, Quantrill posted a 2–0 record and 1.93 ERA in 18 2/3 innings pitched before his season was cut short by an arm injury. He underwent Tommy John surgery and missed the remainder of the season and the entire 2016 season recovering.

== Professional career ==
=== San Diego Padres (2019–2020) ===
Heading into the 2016 Major League Baseball draft, Quantrill was ranked as one of the top available players by MLB. He was selected by the San Diego Padres with the eighth overall selection. The Padres signed Quantrill, and assigned him to the Arizona Padres. They promoted him to the Tri-City Dust Devils in August, and then to the Fort Wayne TinCaps later in the month. He finished the 2016 season with a combined 0–5 record and a 5.11 ERA in 12 starts between the three teams. After the season, Quantrill pitched in the San Diego Padres Futures Game, where he pitched two innings, striking out four.

Quantrill spent 2017 with both the San Antonio Missions and the Lake Elsinore Storm where he posted a combined 7–10 record with a 3.80 ERA in 22 games started between both teams. He began 2018 with San Antonio. On August 6, Quantrill started with the El Paso Chihuahuas the Triple-A affiliate for the Padres. In 28 total starts between San Antonio and El Paso, he was 9–6 with a 4.80 ERA and a 1.47 WHIP. He began 2019 back with El Paso.

Quantrill made his major league debut with the Padres on May 1, 2019, allowing two runs over 5 2/3 innings pitched. He recorded his first major league win in Toronto on May 25. He was optioned to the El Paso Chihuahuas on May 26. On the 2020 season for the Padres, Quantrill was 2-0 in 10 appearances.

=== Cleveland Indians / Guardians (2020–2023) ===
On August 31, 2020, the Padres traded Quantrill, along with Austin Hedges, Josh Naylor, and minor league players Gabriel Arias, Owen Miller, and Joey Cantillo to the Cleveland Indians for Mike Clevinger, Greg Allen, and Matt Waldron. With the 2020 Cleveland Indians, Quantrill appeared in eight games, compiling a 0–0 record with 1.84 ERA and 13 strikeouts in 14 2/3 innings pitched.

In 2021, his first season as a full-time starter, Quantrill went 8-2 with a 2.89 ERA in 149 2/3 innings, with a 1.176 WHIP. In 2022, Quantrill went 15-5 with a 3.38 ERA in 186 1/3 innings, with a 1.208 WHIP. During the season, fans began dubbing the days that Quantrill started "Cal Quantrill Day," following the phenomenon that he could always rely on run support from his offense, and even carried a perfect record at home through the regular season.

On January 13, 2023, Quantrill agreed to a one-year, $5.55 million contract with the Guardians, avoiding salary arbitration. On May 7, Quantrill pitched 6 2/3 no-hit innings against the Minnesota Twins before giving up a single to Alex Kirilloff.

The Guardians designated Quantrill for assignment on November 14, 2023.

=== Colorado Rockies (2024) ===
On November 17, 2023, the Guardians traded Quantrill to the Colorado Rockies in exchange for minor league catcher Kody Huff. In 29 starts for Colorado in 2024, he compiled an 8–11 record and 4.98 ERA with 110 strikeouts across 148 1/3 innings pitched. On November 22, 2024, the Rockies non-tendered Quantrill, making him a free agent.

=== Miami Marlins (2025) ===
On February 12, 2025, Quantrill signed a one-year, $3.5 million contract with the Miami Marlins. On May 18, he pitched an immaculate inning against the Tampa Bay Rays, becoming the second pitcher in Marlins history to do so after Jesús Sánchez in 1998. His three batters were Jonathan Aranda, Christopher Morel, and Kameron Misner. In 24 starts for Miami, Quantrill posted a 4–10 record and 5.50 ERA with 82 strikeouts across 109 2/3 innings pitched.

=== Atlanta Braves (2025) ===
On August 21, 2025, Quantrill was claimed off waivers by the Atlanta Braves. In two starts for the Braves, he struggled to a 13.50 ERA with three strikeouts across eight innings pitched. On September 4, Quantrill was released by Atlanta.

=== Texas Rangers (2025–2026) ===
On September 9, 2025, Quantrill signed a minor league contract with the Texas Rangers. He made two starts for the Triple-A Round Rock Express, logging a 1-0 record and 1.64 ERA with 14 strikeouts over 11 innings of work. Quantrill elected free agency following the season on November 6.

On January 29, 2026, Quantrill re-signed with the Rangers organization on a minor league contract. On April 15, the Rangers selected Quantrill's contract, adding him to their active roster. He made 32 appearances (including 15 starts) for Texas, compiling a 9–5 record and 2.86 ERA with 81 strikeouts across 110 innings pitched. On September 22, Quantrill was placed on the 60–day injured list due to a lat strain, ending his season.

== Personal life ==
Quantrill's father, Paul, played 14 seasons in Major League Baseball.
