= J. C. Mejía =

Dominican baseball player (born 1996)

Diablos Rojos del México – No. 54
- Pitcher
- Born: August 26, 1996 (age 30); Gaspar Hernández, Dominican Republic
- Bats: Right Throws: Right

MLB debut
- May 21, 2021, for the Cleveland Indians

MLB statistics (through 2023 season)
- Win–loss record: 2–7
- Earned run average: 8.32
- Strikeouts: 61
- Stats at Baseball Reference

Teams
- Cleveland Indians (2021); Milwaukee Brewers (2022–2023)

Jean Carlos Mejía (born August 26, 1996) is a Dominican professional baseball pitcher for the Diablos Rojos del México of the Mexican League. He has previously played in Major League Baseball (MLB) for the Cleveland Indians and Milwaukee Brewers.

== Career ==
=== Cleveland Indians ===
Mejía signed with the Cleveland Indians as an international free agent in 2013. He made his professional debut in 2014 with the Dominican Summer League Indians, going 3–0 with a 2.70 ERA in 33 1/3 innings. He returned to the Dominican Summer League in both 2015 and 2016, pitching to a 4–3 record and 1.37 ERA in 39 1/3 relief innings in 2015, and going 2–4 with a 3.48 ERA in 33 2/3 innings in 2016. In 2017, he pitched for both the Arizona League Indians and the Mahoning Valley Scrappers where he compiled a 2–0 record with a 1.22 ERA in 21 relief appearances, and in 2018, he played for the Lake County Captains and the Lynchburg Hillcats, going 4–9 with a 3.31 ERA in 18 games (16 starts).

The Indians added him to their 40-man roster after the 2018 season. Mejía returned to Lynchburg to begin 2019. In 2019, he pitched to a 3–1 record and 4.09 ERA with 36 strikeouts in 33.0 innings of work. Mejía did not play in a game in 2020 due to the cancellation of the minor league season because of the COVID-19 pandemic.

Mejía began the 2021 season with the Triple-A Columbus Clippers. On May 18, 2021, Mejía was promoted to the major leagues for the first time. He made his major league debut on May 21, 2021, against the Minnesota Twins, striking out 5 batters in 2 1/3 innings of relief. Mejía made 17 appearances in 2021, posting an 8.25 ERA and 47 strikeouts. Mejía was designated for assignment by the newly named Cleveland Guardians on November 19, 2021.

=== Milwaukee Brewers ===
On November 22, 2021, Mejía was traded to the Milwaukee Brewers in exchange for a player to be named later (catcher David Fry).

In 2 appearances for Milwaukee, he allowed 6 runs on 5 hits and 5 walks in 2 1/3 innings pitched. On May 17, 2022, Mejía was suspended by Major League Baseball for 80 games after testing positive for stanozolol. On August 18, Mejía was reinstated from his suspension and optioned to the Triple–A Nashville Sounds. On August 24, Mejía was removed from the 40-man roster and sent outright to Triple-A Nashville.

On October 27, 2022, Mejía re–signed with the Brewers on a minor league contract. He was assigned to Nashville to begin the 2023 season, where he made 23 appearances and logged a 3.86 ERA with 32 strikeouts in 30 1/3 innings of work. On July 5, 2023, the Brewers selected Mejía's contract, adding him to the active roster. After posting a 5.56 ERA across 9 appearances, Mejía was placed on the injured list with shoulder inflammation on August 15. He was transferred to the 60–day injured list on September 11, ending his season. On September 20, he was suspended 162 games after testing positive for stanozolol, the second time he tested positive for the substance in his career. He was non-tendered and became a free agent on November 17.

=== Diablos Rojos del México ===
On December 6, 2023, Mejia signed with the Diablos Rojos del México of the Mexican League. However he did not make the team and became a free agent before the season.

On January 31, 2025, Mejía re-signed with the Diablos. He made 34 relief appearances for México, compiling a 2–1 record and 3.74 ERA with 31 strikeouts and three saves across 33 2/3 innings pitched. With the team, Mejía won the Serie del Rey.

He also pitches for the Tigres Del Licey in the Dominican Professional Baseball League

== See also ==
- List of Major League Baseball players suspended for performance-enhancing drugs
