= James Karinchak =

American baseball player (born 1995)

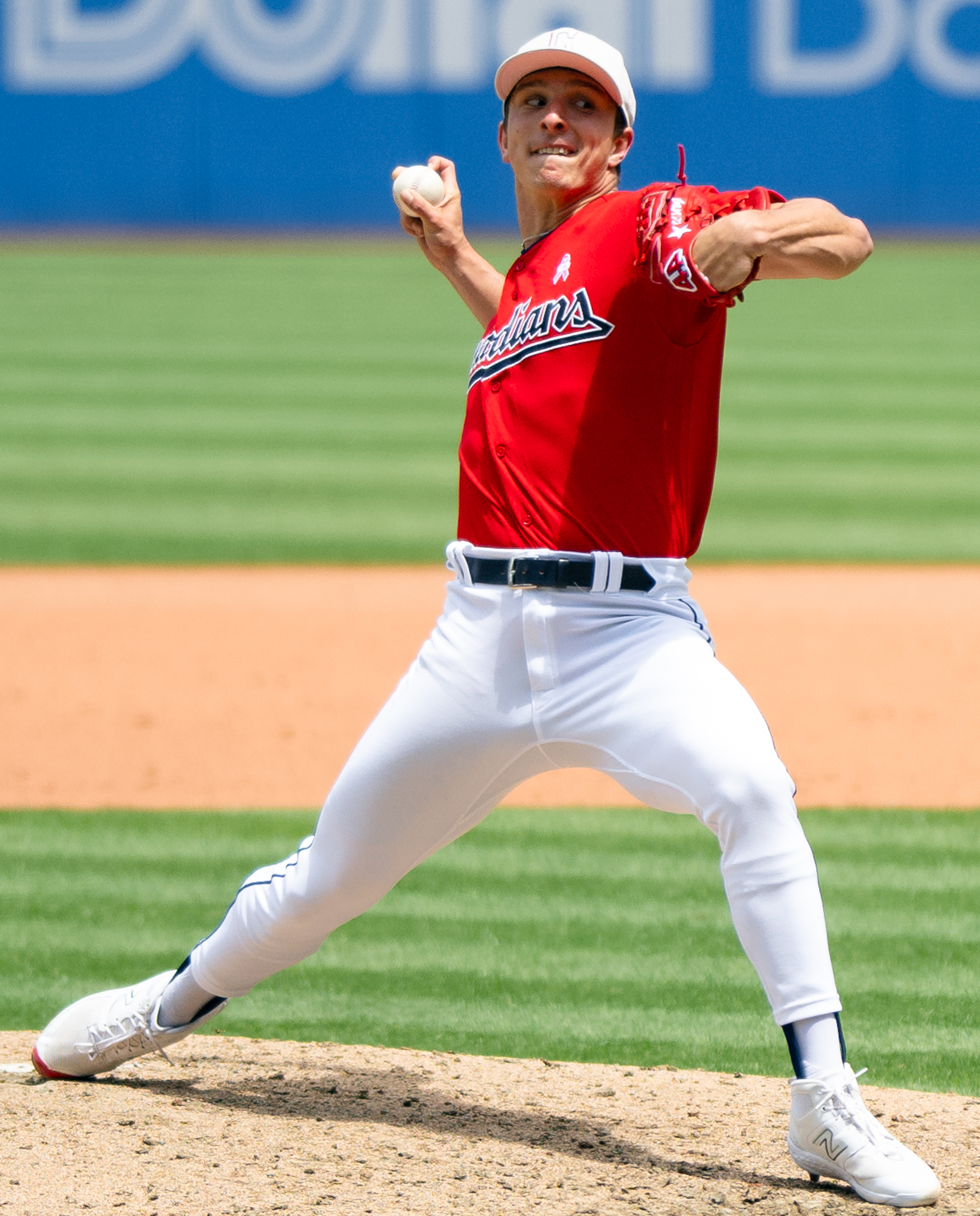
- Karinchak with the Cleveland Guardians in 2023

Free agent
- Pitcher
- Born: September 22, 1995 (age 31); Newburgh, New York, U.S.
- Bats: Right Throws: Right

MLB debut
- September 14, 2019, for the Cleveland Indians

MLB statistics (through 2026 season)
- Win–loss record: 12–11
- Earned run average: 3.03
- Strikeouts: 261
- Stats at Baseball Reference

Teams
- Cleveland Indians / Guardians (2019–2023); Atlanta Braves (2026)

James Stephen Karinchak (born September 22, 1995) is an American professional baseball pitcher who is a free agent. He has previously played in Major League Baseball (MLB) for the Cleveland Indians / Guardians and Atlanta Braves. He played college baseball at Bryant University and was selected by the Cleveland Indians in the ninth round of the 2017 MLB draft. He made his MLB debut in 2019.

== Amateur career ==
Karinchak attended Valley Central High School in Montgomery, New York. Undrafted out of high school, he attended Bryant University, where he played college baseball for the Bulldogs. In 2016, he played collegiate summer baseball with the Chatham Anglers of the Cape Cod Baseball League. Karinchak was drafted by the Cleveland Indians in the ninth round of the 2017 MLB draft.

== Professional career ==
=== Cleveland Indians / Guardians ===
==== Minor leagues ====
Karinchak made his professional debut in 2017 with the Mahoning Valley Scrappers, going 2-2 with a 5.79 ERA over 23 innings. He split 2018 season between the Lake County Captains, Lynchburg Hillcats and Akron RubberDucks, combining to go 4-2 with a 1.29 ERA over 48 2/3 innings. He opened the 2019 season with Akron and was promoted to the Triple-A Columbus Clippers early in May.

==== Major leagues ====
On September 13, 2019, the Indians selected Karinchak's contract and promoted him to the major leagues. He made his major league debut on September 14 against the Minnesota Twins, pitching 1 1/3 scoreless innings and recording three strikeouts.

In 2020, Karinchak pitched in 27 games, compiling a 1–2 record with 2.67 ERA and 53 strikeouts in 27 innings. In his postseason debut, he gave up a grand slam to Gio Urshela then walked two batters before being removed in a loss to the New York Yankees.

In 2021, he pitched to a 7–4 record and a 4.07 ERA with 78 strikeouts and 32 walks in 55 1/3 innings.

In 2022, with the Cleveland Guardians, Karinchak accumulated a 2–0 record and a 2.08 ERA with 62 strikeouts in 39 innings pitched. Karinchak missed the first few months of the season with shoulder injury, making rehab appearances with the Columbus Clippers before returning to the major leagues on July 4. Karinchak's 2.08 ERA was the 9th lowest among AL relievers. He also pitched in four postseason games, going scoreless in five innings while collecting six strikeouts and issuing four base on balls as Cleveland advanced to the AL Division Series.

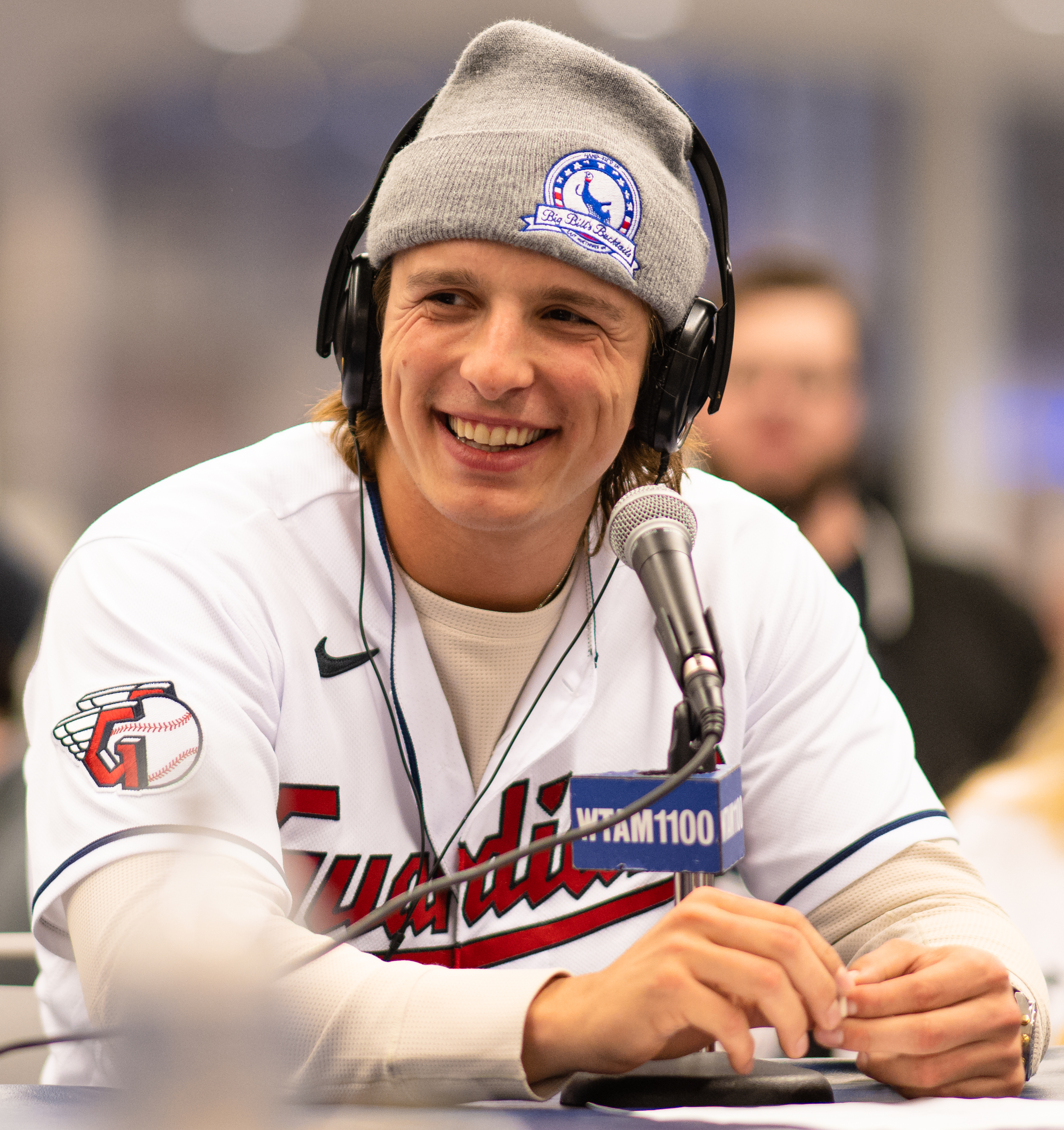
Karinchak in 2023

In 2023, Karinchak appeared in 44 games as a relief pitcher for the Guardians, accumulating a 3.23 ERA with 52 strikeouts across 39 innings pitched.

On January 12, 2024, Karinchak agreed to a $1.9 million contract to avoid arbitration, but he also avoided pitching in the majors for the year. Karinchak was placed on the 60–day injured list with right shoulder inflammation before the 2024 season began. He was sent to Columbus for a rehab assignment in September, pitching in seven games but remaining on the injured list for the entirety of the regular season. Karinchak was outrighted off the Guardians' 40–man roster to Triple–A Columbus on November 4. He subsequently rejected the assignment, electing free agency instead.

=== Chicago White Sox ===
On January 25, 2025, Karinchak signed a minor league contract with the Chicago White Sox. In 24 appearances for the Triple-A Charlotte Knights, he posted a 3-1 record and 2.45 ERA with 34 strikeouts and two saves across 29 1/3 innings pitched. Karinchak was released by the White Sox organization on June 15.

=== Atlanta Braves ===
On December 9, 2025, Karinchak signed a minor league contract with the Atlanta Braves. He began the 2026 season with the Triple-A Gwinnett Stripers, recording a 2.45 ERA with 38 strikeouts and five saves across his first 21 games. On June 10, 2026, the Braves selected Karinchak's contract, adding him to their active roster. On November 20, he was non-tendered by the Braves and became a free agent.

== Personal life ==
Karinchak grew up a New York Yankees fan.

Karinchak faced criticism in 2021 after making a post on Instagram expressing his views on the COVID-19 vaccine mandates. The post included a quote incorrectly attributed to Nazi Party leader Hermann Göring. Karinchak's post was condemned by the Anti-Defamation League of Cleveland. In 2022, Karinchak was unable to travel to Toronto for a series against the Blue Jays and placed on the restricted list as he was not vaccinated against COVID-19.
