= Justin Garza =

American baseball player (born 1994)

Free agent
- Pitcher
- Born: March 20, 1994 (age 32); Glendora, California, U.S.
- Bats: Right Throws: Right

MLB debut
- June 27, 2021, for the Cleveland Indians

MLB statistics (through 2025 season)
- Win–loss record: 2–3
- Earned run average: 5.70
- Strikeouts: 49
- Stats at Baseball Reference

Teams
- Cleveland Indians (2021); Boston Red Sox (2023); New York Mets (2025)

Justin Charles Garza (born March 20, 1994) is an American professional baseball pitcher who is a free agent. He has previously played in Major League Baseball (MLB) for the Cleveland Indians, Boston Red Sox, and New York Mets. He made his MLB debut in 2021.

== Early life and amateur career ==
Garza grew up in Ontario, California, and attended Bonita High School. He was named a high school All-American as a senior by Baseball America after posting a 12–1 record on the mound with a 0.72 earned run average (ERA) and 101 strikeouts over 88 innings pitched. Garza was selected in the 26th round of the 2012 MLB draft by the Cleveland Indians, but opted not to sign.

Garza played college baseball for the Cal State Fullerton Titans for three seasons. As a freshman, he went 12–0 with a 2.03 ERA and a team-leading 95 strikeouts and was named the Big West Conference pitcher of the year. Garza's junior season was cut short after he suffered a partially torn UCL that required Tommy John surgery. He finished his collegiate career with 21–7 career record with a 2.64 ERA and 208 strikeouts in 252 2/3 innings pitched.

== Professional career ==
=== Cleveland Indians / Guardians ===
Garza was drafted by the Cleveland Indians for a second time in the eighth round of the 2015 MLB draft. After signing with the team, Garza spent rest of the 2015 and much of the 2016 rehabbing from his surgery before being assigned to the Arizona League Indians towards the end of the season. In 2017, Garza pitched for the Single-A Lake County Captains, posting a 4–6 record and 5.83 ERA in 26 appearances. In 2018, Garza split the season between the Low-A Mahoning Valley Scrappers and the High-A Lynchburg Hillcats of the Carolina League, accumulating a 5–6 record and 3.36 ERA in 18 games between the two teams. In 2019, Garza returned to Lynchburg, and pitched to a 6–9 record and 4.99 ERA with 109 strikeouts in 119 innings of work.

Garza did not play in a game in 2020 due to the cancellation of the minor league season because of the COVID-19 pandemic. To begin the 2021 season, he was assigned to the Akron RubberDucks of the Double-A Northeast before being promoted to the Triple-A Columbus Clippers after one appearance. In 12 games with Columbus, Garza notched a stellar 0.44 ERA with 28 strikeouts. The Indians selected Garza's contract and promoted him to the major leagues for the first time on June 24, 2021. Garza made his major league debut on June 27, and pitched 2 2/3 innings of one-run relief with three strikeouts against the Minnesota Twins in an 8–2 loss. Garza earned his first career win on July 31, after pitching two innings of scoreless relief in a 12–11 victory over the Chicago White Sox.

Garza was designated for assignment by the newly named Guardians on November 19, 2021. After clearing waivers, he was outrighted to Triple-A Columbus on November 24. In 37 relief outings for Columbus, Garza recorded a 4.64 ERA with 50 strikeouts and 7 saves across 42 2/3 innings pitched. He elected minor league free agency after the season on November 10, 2022.

=== Los Angeles Angels ===
On December 12, 2022, Garza signed a one-year, major league deal with the Los Angeles Angels. He was optioned to the Triple-A Salt Lake Bees to start the 2023 season. He made six appearances for Salt Lake, posting a 4.32 ERA with 5 strikeouts in 8 1/3 innings pitched before he was designated for assignment on April 21, 2023.

=== Boston Red Sox ===
On April 28, 2023, Garza was claimed off waivers by the Boston Red Sox and was optioned to the Triple-A Worcester Red Sox. He was added to Boston's active roster on May 16, and optioned back to Worcester on July 8. Later in July, he was briefly called up for two days. In 17 games for Boston, he struggled to a 7.36 ERA with 17 strikeouts across 18 1/3 innings of work. Following the season on November 2, Garza was removed from the 40-man roster and sent outright to Triple–A Worcester. He rejected the assignment and elected free agency on November 6.

=== San Francisco Giants ===
On March 7, 2024, Garza signed a minor league contract with the San Francisco Giants. In 39 appearances for the Single–A San Jose Giants and Triple–A Sacramento River Cats, he compiled a 5–2 record and 3.60 ERA with 63 strikeouts and 4 saves across 55 innings pitched.

On November 24, 2024, Garza re-signed with the Giants on a minor league contract. Garza began 2025 with the Triple-A Sacramento River Cats, posting a 1–2 record and 6.11 ERA with 20 strikeouts and six saves across 17 2/3 innings pitched.

=== New York Mets ===
On June 7, 2025, Garza was traded to the New York Mets in exchange for cash considerations. On June 9, the Mets selected Garza's contract, adding him to their active roster. In five appearances for the Mets, he recorded a 5.40 ERA with three strikeouts across 6 2/3 innings pitched. On September 7, Garza was designated for assignment by the Mets. He elected free agency after clearing waivers on September 9.
