= Zach Plesac =

American baseball player (born 1995)

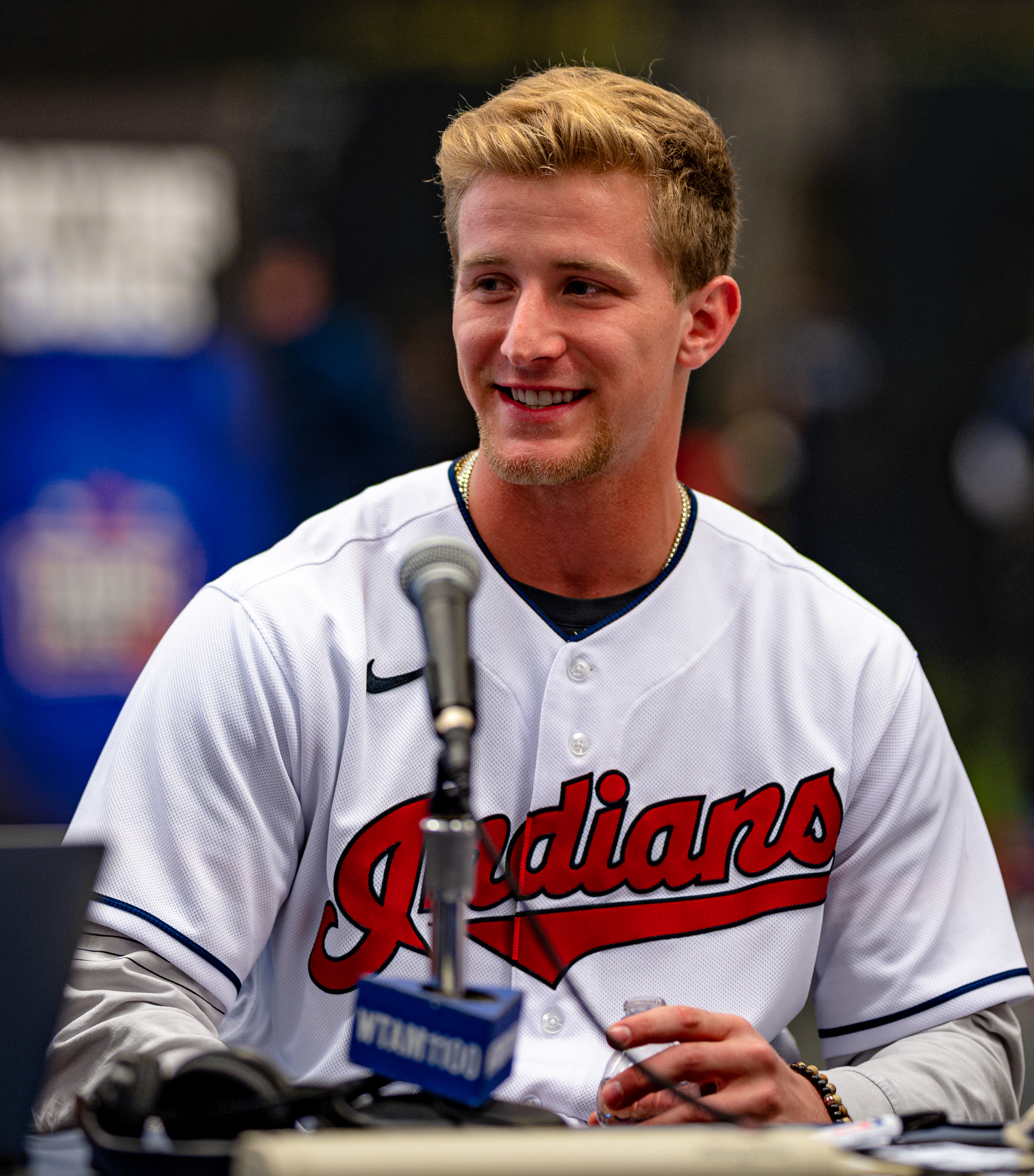
- Plesac with the Cleveland Indians in 2020

Gary SouthShore RailCats – No. 50
- Pitcher
- Born: January 21, 1995 (age 31); Crown Point, Indiana, U.S.
- Bats: Right Throws: Right

MLB debut
- May 28, 2019, for the Cleveland Indians

MLB statistics (through 2024 season)
- Win–loss record: 27–28
- Earned run average: 4.31
- Strikeouts: 364
- Stats at Baseball Reference

Teams
- Cleveland Indians / Guardians (2019–2023); Los Angeles Angels (2024)

Career highlights and awards
- Pitched an immaculate inning on September 18, 2020

Zach Robert Plesac (born January 21, 1995) is an American professional baseball pitcher for the Gary SouthShore RailCats of the American Association of Professional Baseball. He has previously played in Major League Baseball (MLB) for the Cleveland Indians/Guardians and Los Angeles Angels.

Plesac played college baseball at Ball State University. The Indians selected him in the 12th round of the 2016 MLB draft and he made his MLB debut for them in 2019.

== Amateur career ==
Plesac was born in Crown Point, Indiana, and attended Crown Point High School, where he earned many accolades. Plesac starred in football, basketball, and baseball in high school.

Plesac enrolled at Ball State University in 2014 and played college baseball for the Ball State Cardinals. In his freshman year, he had a 12–2 win–loss record with a 2.11 earned run average (ERA) and six saves in 25 games played, with six games started, to earn Collegiate Baseball Newspaper Freshman Pitcher of the Year honors. He was also named to the American Baseball Coaches Association/Rawlings All-Midwest Region Team, a National Collegiate Baseball Writers Association Freshman All-American, a Louisville Slugger Third Team All-American, the Mid-American Conference (MAC) Freshman Pitcher of the Year and a Collegiate Baseball Freshman All-American. In 2015, he was 5–5 with a 3.27 ERA in 16 starts to earn All-MAC Second Team honors. He also played for the Wareham Gatemen of the Cape Cod League that year, and was 0–2 with an 11.88 ERA.

== Professional career ==
=== Cleveland Indians / Guardians ===
==== Minor leagues ====
The Cleveland Indians selected Plesac in the 12th round, with the 362nd overall pick, of the 2016 Major League Baseball draft. He signed on June 29, 2016, for a $100,000 signing bonus. He began his professional career in 2017 with the Low-A Mahoning Valley Scrappers, and after posting a 1.38 ERA in eight games (seven starts), was promoted to the Single-A Lake County Captains where he finished the season, posting a 1–1 record with a 3.60 ERA in six starts.

In 2018, Plesac played for both the High-A Lynchburg Hillcats and the Double-A Akron RubberDucks, pitching to a combined 11–6 record with a 3.79 ERA in 26 total starts between both teams. He returned to Akron to begin 2019, and was promoted to the Triple-A Columbus Clippers in early May.

==== Major leagues ====
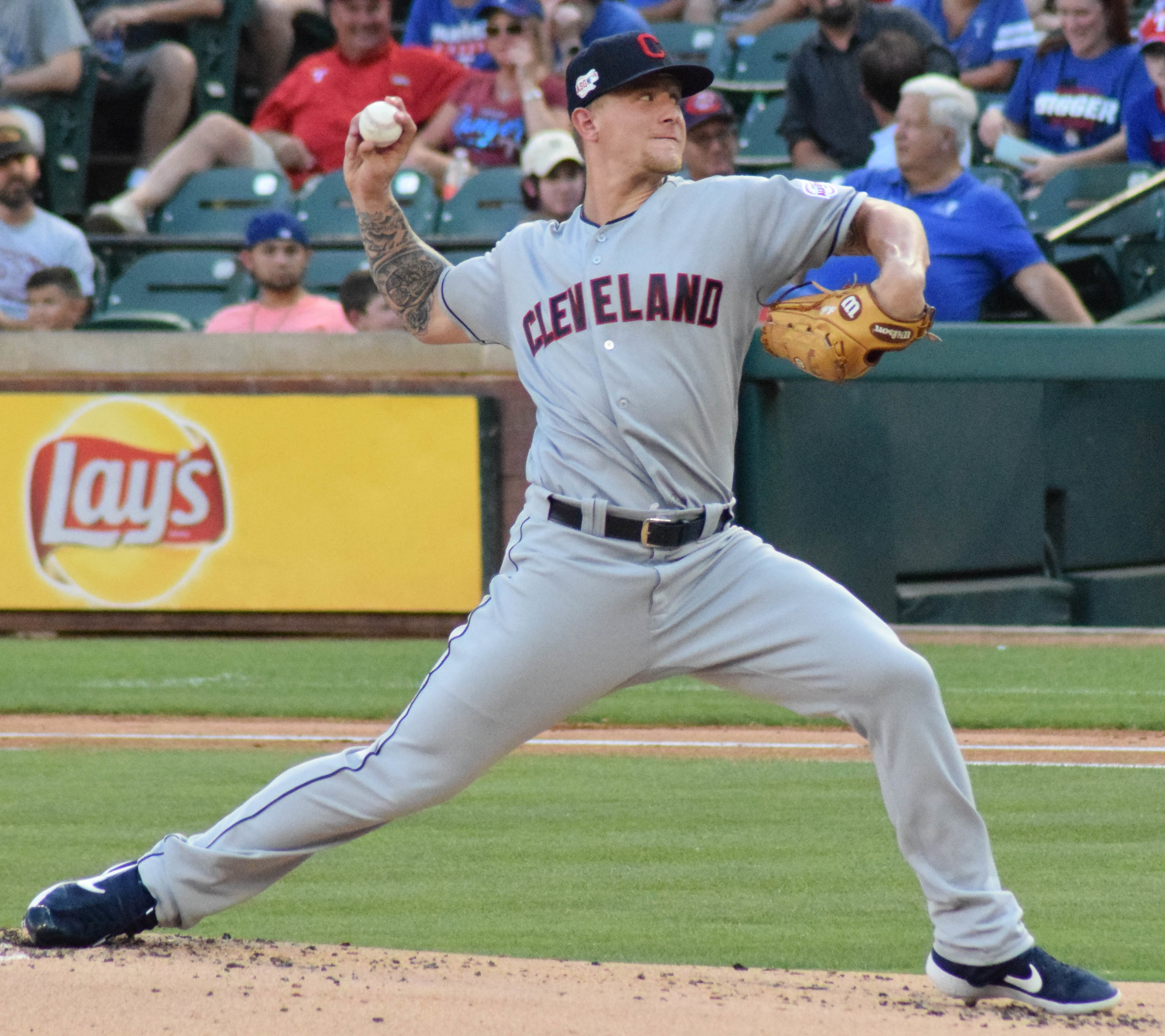
Plesac with the Indians in 2019

The Indians selected Plesac's contract from the Clippers on May 28, 2019. He made his MLB debut that day at Fenway Park against the Boston Red Sox, allowing one run on four hits in 5 1/3 innings and receiving a no decision. On September 10, Plesac pitched a four-hit shutout against the Los Angeles Angels. It was both Plesac's first complete game and first shutout of his career. For the season, Plesac ended with an 8–6 record in 21 starts. He struck out 88 in 115 2/3 innings.

In his first start of the 2020 season, Plesac had one of the best outings of his career against the Chicago White Sox, going eight innings, striking out 11, and allowing no earned runs. On August 9, Plesac was sent home by the Indians after violating team and Major League Baseball COVID-19 protocols after going out with friends in Chicago following a game against the White Sox. Plesac later issued a statement apologizing.

On September 18, 2020, against the Detroit Tigers, Plesac threw the 97th immaculate inning in MLB history. Plesac would strikeout Jorge Bonifacio, Niko Goodrum, and Austin Romine with just 9 pitches thrown in the 2nd inning. He would become just the third Cleveland Indians pitcher to throw an immaculate inning, and the first since Carlos Carrasco on July 7, 2017, who also accomplished the feat against the Detroit Tigers.

With the 2020 Cleveland Indians, Plesac appeared in eight games, compiling a 4–2 record with 2.28 ERA and 57 strikeouts in 55 1/3 innings pitched. In 2021, Plesac had a 10–6 record, a 4.67 ERA, and 100 strikeouts. Plesac was the starting pitcher on the opposite end of three no-hitters, an MLB record; the Indians were the first team to be no-hit in three games in one season. In 2022, Plesac was 3–12 with a 4.31 ERA in 131 2/3 innings, with a 1.322 WHIP.

On January 13, 2023, Plesac agreed to a one-year, $2.95 million contract with the Guardians, avoiding salary arbitration. After struggling to a 7.59 ERA across five starts to begin the year in 2023, Plesac was optioned to Columbus on May 4. On June 4, Plesac was designated for assignment by the Guardians. Upon clearing waivers, Plesac accepted an outright assignment to Columbus on June 11. Plesac elected free agency following the season on October 13.

=== Los Angeles Angels ===
On January 6, 2024, the Los Angeles Angels signed Plesac to a one-year contract worth $1 million. He was optioned to the Triple–A Salt Lake Bees to begin the 2024 season. On April 8, the Angels designated Plesac for assignment. He cleared waivers and was sent outright to Salt Lake two days later. In 13 starts for Salt Lake, he compiled a 3–7 record and 5.42 ERA with 51 strikeouts across 74 2/3 innings. On June 17, the Angels selected Plesac's contract, adding him to their active roster. In 3 starts for the Angels, he struggled to an 8.25 ERA with 5 strikeouts across 12 innings. Plesac was released by the Angels on August 12.

=== Long Island Ducks ===
On April 9, 2025, Plesac signed with the Long Island Ducks of the Atlantic League of Professional Baseball. In seven starts for the Ducks, Plesac logged a 4–1 record and 2.84 ERA with 33 strikeouts over 38 innings of work.

=== St. Louis Cardinals ===
On June 5, 2025, Plesac's contract was purchased by the St. Louis Cardinals organization. He made 15 appearances (14 starts) for the Triple-A Memphis Redbirds, but struggled to a 1–8 record and 7.67 ERA with 47 strikeouts across 58 2/3 innings pitched. Plesac elected free agency following the season on November 6.

=== Charros de Jalisco ===
On March 9, 2026, Plesac signed with the Charros de Jalisco of the Mexican League. In 13 appearances (12 starts) for the Charros, he posted a 3–6 record with a 6.79 ERA and 46 strikeouts in 62 1/3 innings. On July 17, Plesac was released by Jalisco.

=== Gary SouthShore RailCats ===
On August 1, 2026, Plesac signed with the Gary SouthShore RailCats of the American Association of Professional Baseball.

== Personal life ==
Zach is the son of Ron and Jeannine Plesac, and he has two brothers. His uncle, Dan Plesac, played in the major leagues from 1986 to 2003. Another uncle, Joe Plesac, played in the minor leagues from 1982 to 1987. Zach is the cousin of shortstop Blaze Alexander, who debuted for the Diamondbacks in 2024.
