= Triston McKenzie =

American baseball player (born 1997)

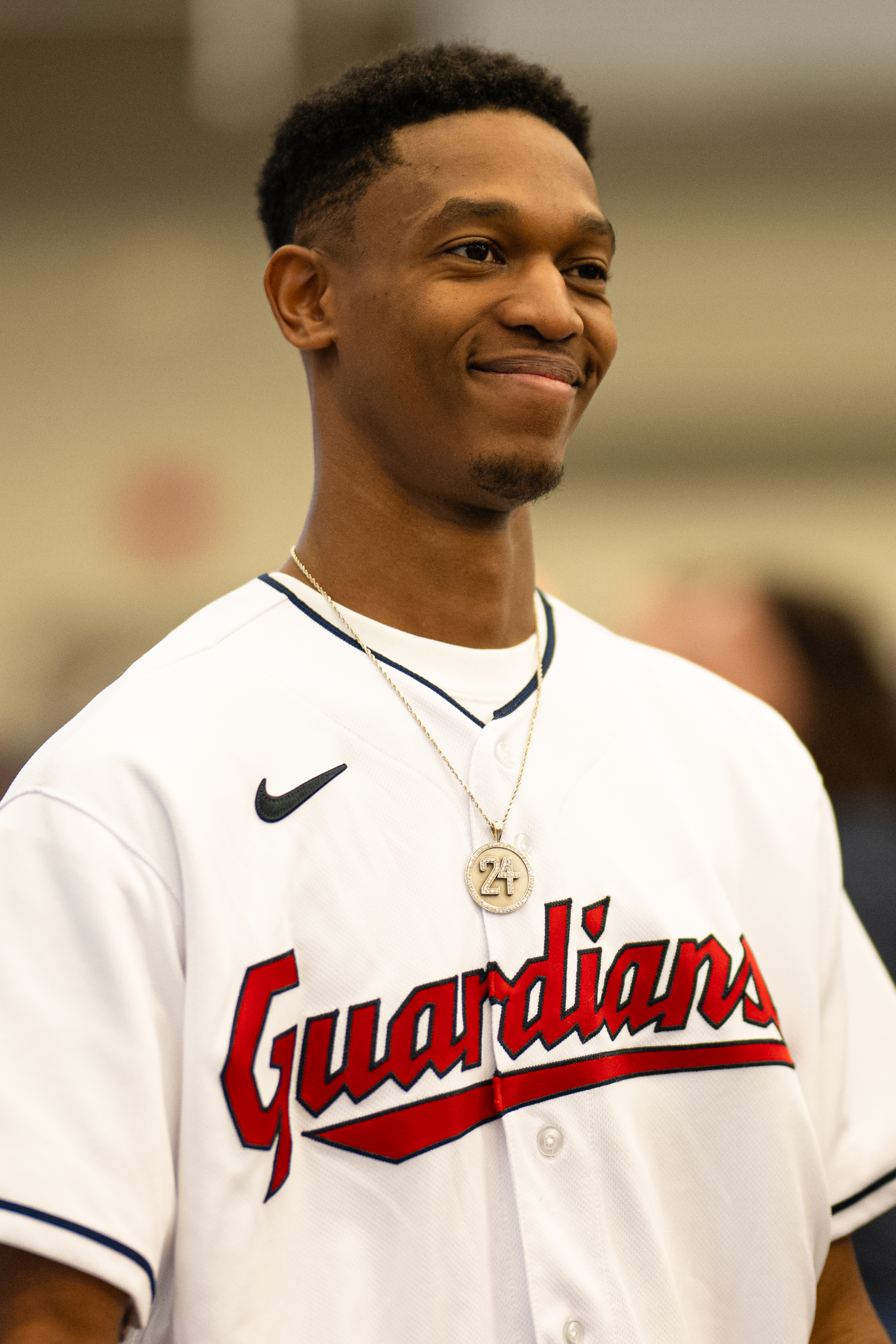
- McKenzie with the Cleveland Guardians in 2024

Free agent
- Pitcher
- Born: August 2, 1997 (age 29); Brooklyn, New York City, U.S.
- Bats: Right Throws: Right

MLB debut
- August 22, 2020, for the Cleveland Indians

MLB statistics (through 2025 season)
- Win–loss record: 21–29
- Earned run average: 4.07
- Strikeouts: 462
- Stats at Baseball Reference

Teams
- Cleveland Indians / Guardians (2020–2025)

Triston Andrew McKenzie (born August 2, 1997) is an American professional baseball pitcher who is a free agent. He has previously played in Major League Baseball (MLB) for the Cleveland Guardians. He was drafted by Cleveland with the 42nd overall selection of the 2015 MLB draft. He made his MLB debut in 2020.

== Amateur career ==
McKenzie attended Royal Palm Beach High School in Royal Palm Beach, Florida. In his senior season of 2015, he was coached by former major-league pitcher Kason Gabbard, and posted a 9–5 win–loss record with a 0.79 earned run average (ERA).

== Professional career ==
=== Cleveland Indians / Guardians ===
McKenzie was drafted by the Cleveland Indians with the 42nd overall selection of the 2015 Major League Baseball draft. He signed for $2.3 million, forgoing his commitment to play college baseball at Vanderbilt University. McKenzie spent his first professional season with the Arizona League Indians where he posted a 0.75 ERA in 12 innings pitched.

In 2016, McKenzie began the season with the Mahoning Valley Scrappers (rookie summer league) before being promoted to the Lake County Captains (High-A league); he posted a combined 1.62 ERA with 104 strikeouts in 83 1/3 innings pitched between the two teams. In 2017, McKenzie played for the Single-A Lynchburg Hillcats where he posted a 12–6 record with a 3.46 ERA in 25 games started. That same year, he pitched in the All-Star Futures Game. In 2018, he spent the season with the Akron RubberDucks (Double-A), going 7–4 with a 2.68 ERA over 90 2/3 innings. MLB Pipeline ranked McKenzie as Cleveland's first ranked prospect entering into the 2019 season. In 2019, he missed the season due to lat and pectoral muscle strains. Following the season, McKenzie was added to the Indians 40-man roster.

On August 22, 2020, McKenzie made his major league debut against the Detroit Tigers, striking out ten batters in six innings; McKenzie's 10 strikeouts in his debut performance is the second most by an Indians pitcher in their first major league start. With the 2020 Cleveland Indians, McKenzie appeared in 8 games, compiling a 2–1 record with 3.24 ERA and 42 strikeouts in 33 1/3 innings pitched. He pitched in relief in Game Two of the AL Wild Card Series against the New York Yankees, giving up two earned runs in 1 2/3 innings pitched. The Indians were defeated, 10-9, in the longest nine-inning MLB game ever played; the defeat ended their season.

McKenzie began the 2021 season as a member of Cleveland's starting rotation. On May 22, 2021, McKenzie was optioned to the Triple-A Columbus Clippers after compiling a 1–3 record, a 6.89 ERA, and 30 walks over 31 1/3 innings. McKenzie was recalled on May 26, and on May 31 against the Chicago White Sox, he set the Indians franchise record for most consecutive strikeouts, punching out 8 White Sox hitters in a row. McKenzie was demoted again after a poor outing on June 12, due in great part to his high rate of walking batters. He was recalled for a spot start on July 9, in which he pitched seven shutout innings, giving up just one hit and one walk, while striking out nine Kansas City Royals batters. McKenzie also threw 7+ innings against the Los Angeles Angels on August 21, allowing only two hits and striking out Shohei Ohtani three times.

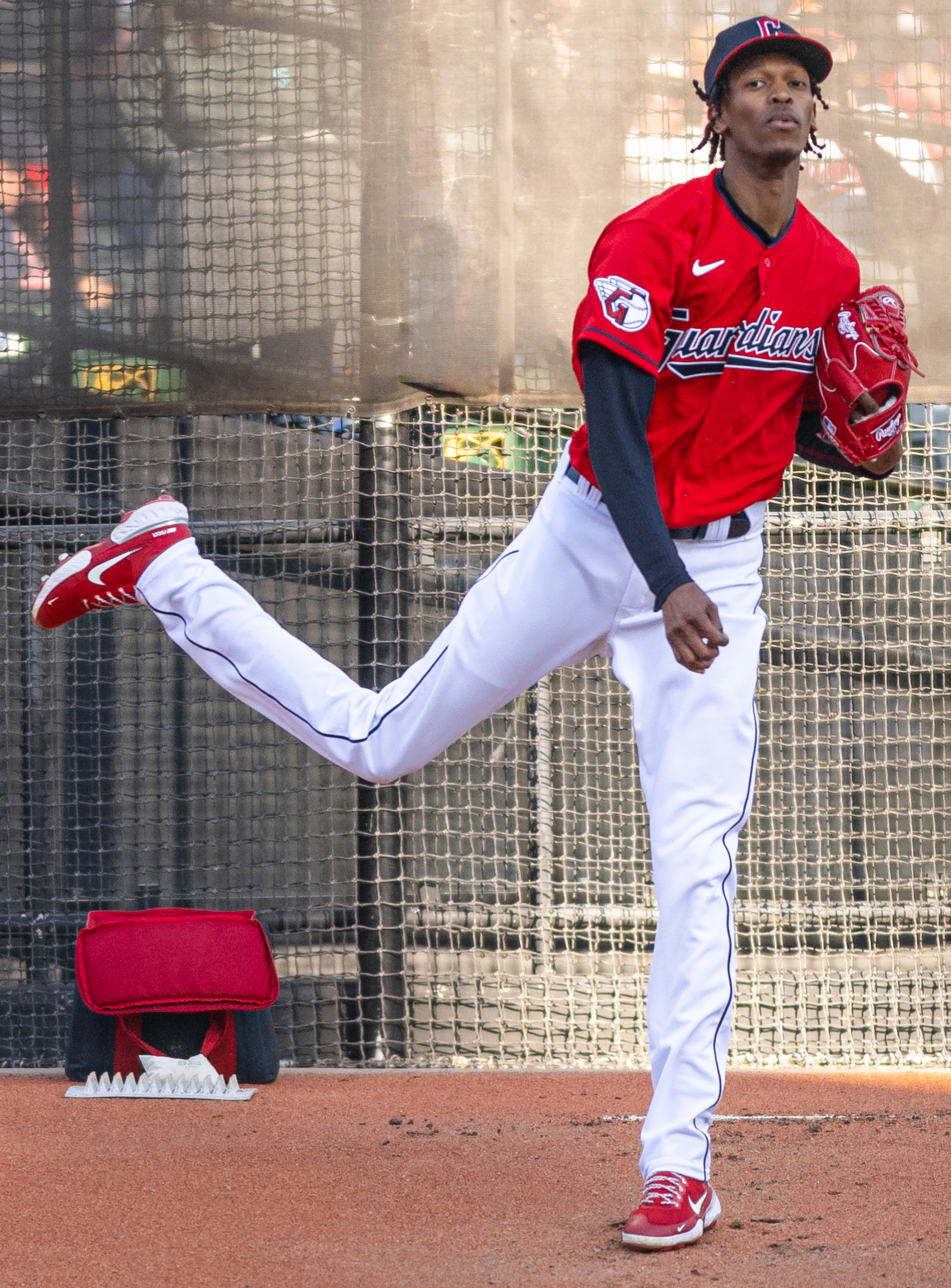
McKenzie at Progressive Field in 2022

Prior to the 2022 season, Marcus Stroman publicly promised on Twitter that he would buy McKenzie a Rolex watch if he pitched more than 160 innings that season and finished with an ERA below 3.70. He finished the year with an 11–11 record and 2.96 ERA in 191.1 innings. It was described in The Athletic as a "breakout season." McKenzie called it "refreshing." In September 2022, McKenzie was named as the Guardians' nominee for the Roberto Clemente Award, which honors an MLB player who represents the game of baseball well and demonstrates character and community service. In the AL Wild Card Series, McKenzie pitched six shutout innings in the Guardians' 1-0 victory over the Tampa Bay Rays; with the victory, the Guardians advanced to the AL Division Series. In the AL Division Series, McKenzie gave up four runs in five innings in the Guardians' 6-5 victory over the Yankees in Game Three. The Guardians went on to lose the series to the Yankees by a margin of three games to two. After the season, Marcus Stroman followed through on his promise and purchased McKenzie a Rolex.

McKenzie's next three seasons were significantly affected by injuries. He began the 2023 season on the 60-day injured list with a right teres major muscle strain. He was activated to make his season debut on June 4, 2023. After just two starts, McKenzie was scratched from a scheduled June 16 start against the Arizona Diamondbacks due to right elbow discomfort. The next day, he was placed on the injured list after an MRI revealed a sprain in his ulnar collateral ligament (UCL). While UCL injuries generally require Tommy John surgery, McKenzie opted against it and took a conservative approach to his injury. He was transferred to the 60-day injured list on July 6. McKenzie was activated from the injured list on September 24. He started for the Guardians that day against the Baltimore Orioles and took the loss, pitching 1 2/3 innings and walking six batters in a 5-1 defeat. He finished the season with an 0-3 record and a 5.06 ERA.

In April 2024, citing McKenzie's "shaky results on the mound", Zack Meisel and Jason Lloyd of The New York Times questioned whether McKenzie's decision to forego Tommy John surgery the previous year had been the correct one. McKenzie made 16 MLB starts for Cleveland during the 2024 campaign, posting a 3-5 record and 5.11 ERA with 74 strikeouts across 75 2/3 innings pitched. He was optioned to Cleveland's minor league affiliate on June 30, 2024, having led the American League in walks and in home runs allowed at that point in the season.

McKenzie began the 2025 season as a member of the Guardians' bullpen. He made four relief appearances for the Guardians in 2025, struggling to an 11.12 ERA with four strikeouts across 5 2/3 innings pitched. On April 21, 2025, McKenzie was designated for assignment by Cleveland. He cleared waivers and was sent outright to Columbus on April 28. McKenzie elected free agency on September 29.

=== San Diego Padres ===
On December 18, 2025, McKenzie signed a minor league contract with the San Diego Padres. He made 14 appearances (including three starts) for the Triple–A El Paso Chihuahuas, but struggled to a 15.98 ERA with 22 strikeouts and 40 walks across 16 1/3 innings pitched. McKenzie was released by the Padres on July 4, 2026.

=== Player profile ===
McKenzie is known for his very slim frame. Baseball Reference lists his height as 6'5" and his weight as 165 pounds.

== Personal life ==
Born in the United States, McKenzie is of Jamaican descent through his father. His younger brother, T.J., was drafted by the St. Louis Cardinals in the 39th round of the 2019 Major League Baseball draft but enrolled at Vanderbilt University to play college baseball.
