= 2021 Kansas City Royals season =

2021 Kansas City Royals
- League: American League
- Division: Central
- Ballpark: Kauffman Stadium
- City: Kansas City, Missouri
- Record: 74–88 (.457)
- Divisional place: 4th
- Owners: John Sherman
- General managers: Dayton Moore
- Managers: Mike Matheny
- Television: Bally Sports Kansas City (Ryan Lefebvre, Jeff Montgomery, Rex Hudler, Steve Physioc)
- Radio: KCSP 610 AM (Denny Matthews, Steve Stewart, Rex Hudler, Ryan Lefebvre, Steve Physioc, Jeff Montgomery)

The 2021 Kansas City Royals season was the 53rd season of the franchise, and their 49th season at Kauffman Stadium. The team finished with a 74–88 win–loss record, landing them in fourth place in the American League Central ahead of the Minnesota Twins by one game. They won their 4,000th game in franchise history on September 29.

== Regular season ==
The Royals won 14–10 against the Texas Rangers to open the season. The 14 runs set a Royals franchise record for Opening Day.

=== American League Central ===
AL Central
Team	W	L	Pct.	GB	Home	Road
Chicago White Sox	93	69	.574	—	53‍–‍28	40‍–‍41
Cleveland Indians	80	82	.494	13	40‍–‍41	40‍–‍41
Detroit Tigers	77	85	.475	16	42‍–‍39	35‍–‍46
Kansas City Royals	74	88	.457	19	39‍–‍42	35‍–‍46
Minnesota Twins	73	89	.451	20	38‍–‍43	35‍–‍46

=== American League Wild Card ===
Division leaders
Team	W	L	Pct.
Tampa Bay Rays	100	62	.617
Houston Astros	95	67	.586
Chicago White Sox	93	69	.574

Wild Card teams (Top 2 teams qualify for postseason)
Team	W	L	Pct.	GB
Boston Red Sox	92	70	.568	—
New York Yankees	92	70	.568	—
Toronto Blue Jays	91	71	.562	1
Seattle Mariners	90	72	.556	2
Oakland Athletics	86	76	.531	6
Cleveland Indians	80	82	.494	12
Los Angeles Angels	77	85	.475	15
Detroit Tigers	77	85	.475	15
Kansas City Royals	74	88	.457	18
Minnesota Twins	73	89	.451	19
Texas Rangers	60	102	.370	32
Baltimore Orioles	52	110	.321	40

=== Record against opponents ===
2021 American League record Source: MLB Standings Grid – 2021
Team	BAL	BOS	CWS	CLE	DET	HOU	KC	LAA	MIN	NYY	OAK	SEA	TB	TEX	TOR	NL
Baltimore	—	6–13	0–7	2–5	2–5	3–3	4–3	2–4	2–4	8–11	3–3	3–4	1–18	4–3	5–14	7–13
Boston	13–6	—	3–4	4–2	3–3	2–5	5–2	3–3	5–2	10–9	3–3	4–3	8–11	3–4	10–9	16–4
Chicago	7–0	4–3	—	10–9	12–7	2–5	9–10	2–5	13–6	1–5	4–3	3–3	3–3	5–1	4–3	14–6
Cleveland	5–2	2–4	9–10	—	12–7	1–6	14–5	5–1	8–11	3–4	2–4	3–4	1–6	4–2	2–5	9–11
Detroit	5–2	3–3	7–12	7–12	—	5–2	8–11	1–6	8–11	3–3	1–6	5–1	4–3	6–1	3–3	11–9
Houston	3–3	5–2	5–2	6–1	2–5	—	3–4	13–6	3–4	2–4	11–8	11–8	4–2	14–5	4–2	9–11
Kansas City	3–4	2–5	10–9	5–14	11–8	4–3	—	2–4	10–9	2–4	2–5	4–3	2–4	2–4	3–4	12–8
Los Angeles	4–2	3–3	5–2	1–5	6–1	6–13	4–2	—	5–2	4–3	4–15	8–11	1–6	11–8	4–3	11–9
Minnesota	4–2	2–5	6–13	11–8	11–8	4–3	9–10	2–5	—	1–6	1–5	2–4	3–3	4–3	3–4	10–10
New York	11–8	9–10	5–1	4–3	3–3	4–2	4–2	3–4	6–1	—	4–3	5–2	8–11	6–1	8–11	12–8
Oakland	3–3	3–3	3–4	4–2	6–1	8–11	5–2	15–4	5–1	3–4	—	4–15	4–3	10–9	2–5	11–9
Seattle	4–3	3–4	3–3	4–3	1–5	8–11	3–4	11–8	4–2	2–5	15–4	—	6–1	13–6	4–2	9–11
Tampa Bay	18–1	11–8	3–3	6–1	3–4	2–4	4–2	6–1	3–3	11–8	3–4	1–6	—	3–4	11–8	15–5
Texas	3–4	4–3	1–5	2–4	1–6	5–14	4–2	8–11	3–4	1–6	9–10	6–13	4–3	—	2–4	7–13
Toronto	14–5	9–10	3–4	5–2	3–3	2–4	4–3	3–4	4–3	11–8	5–2	2–4	8–11	4–2	—	14–6

Updated with the results of all games through October 3, 2021.

== Game log ==
2021 Game Log: 74–88 (Home: 39–42; Away: 35–46)
April: 15–9 (Home: 8–5; Away: 7–4)

#	Date	Opponent	Score	Win	Loss	Save	Attendance	Record	Streak
1	April 1	Rangers	14–10	**Hernández** (1–0)	Cody (0–1)	**Davis** (1)	9,155	1–0	W1
2	April 3	Rangers	11–4	**Minor** (1–0)	Sborz (0–1)	—	8,889	2–0	W2
3	April 4	Rangers	3–7	Lyles (1–0)	**Singer** (0–1)	—	8,869	2–1	L1
4	April 5	@ Indians	3–0	**Duffy** (1–0)	Allen (0–1)	**Hahn** (1)	8,914	3–1	W1
5	April 7	@ Indians	2–4	Clase (1–0)	**Holland** (0–1)	Wittgren (1)	5,908	3–2	L1
6	April 8	@ White Sox	0–6	Lynn (1–0)	**Keller** (0–1)	—	8,207	3–3	L2
–	April 10	@ White Sox	Postponed (Rain, Makeup May 14)						
7	April 11	@ White Sox	4–3 (10)	**Holland** (1–1)	Crochet (0–1)	**Zimmer** (1)	7,695	4–3	W1
8	April 12	Angels	3–10	Cobb (1–0)	**Singer** (0–2)	—	6,962	4–4	L1
9	April 13	Angels	3–2	**Duffy** (2–0)	Bundy (0–1)	**Holland** (1)	6,404	5–4	W1
10	April 14	Angels	6–1	**Keller** (1–1)	Canning (0–1)	—	6,814	6–4	W2
11	April 15	Blue Jays	7–5	**Junis** (1–0)	Kay (0–1)	**Barlow** (1)	6,266	7–4	W3
—	April 16	Blue Jays	Postponed (Rain, Makeup: April 17)						
12	April 17 (1)	Blue Jays	1–5 (7)	Matz (3–0)	**Minor** (1–1)	—	N/A	7–5	L1
13	April 17 (2)	Blue Jays	3–2 (7)	**Holland** (2–1)	Payamps (0–1)	—	8,950	8–5	W1
14	April 18	Blue Jays	2–0	**Zimmer** (1–0)	Zeuch (0–2)	**Holland** (2)	9,042	9–5	W2
15	April 19	Rays	1–4	Fleming (1–1)	**Duffy** (2–1)	—	5,589	9–6	L1
16	April 20	Rays	7–14	Kittredge (3–0)	**Keller** (1–2)	Richards (1)	4,481	9–7	L2
17	April 21	Rays	9–8	**Barlow** (1–0)	Castillo (0–1)	—	5,053	10–7	W1
18	April 23	@ Tigers	6–2	**Minor** (2–1)	Mize (1–2)	—	8,000	11–7	W2
19	April 24	@ Tigers	2–1	**Singer** (1–2)	Boyd (2–2)	**Staumont** (1)	8,000	12–7	W3
20	April 25	@ Tigers	4–0	**Duffy** (3–1)	Skubal (0–3)	—	8,000	13–7	W4
21	April 26	@ Tigers	3–2	**Keller** (2–2)	Turnbull (1–1)	**Staumont** (2)	7,288	14–7	W5
22	April 27	@ Pirates	1–2	Underwood Jr. (1–0)	**Junis** (1–1)	Rodríguez (4)	5,510	14–8	L1
23	April 28	@ Pirates	9–6	**Zimmer** (2–0)	Keller (1–3)	**Staumont** (3)	4,226	15–8	W1
24	April 30	@ Twins	1–9	Pineda (2–1)	**Singer** (1–3)	—	9,982	15–9	L1

May: 11–17 (Home: 5–8; Away: 6–9)

#	Date	Opponent	Score	Win	Loss	Save	Attendance	Record	Streak
25	May 1	@ Twins	11–3	**Duffy** (4–1)	Shoemaker (1–3)	—	9,993	16–9	W1
26	May 2	@ Twins	4–13	Berríos (3–2)	**Keller** (2–3)	—	9,997	16–10	L1
27	May 3	Indians	6–8	Shaw (1–0)	**Junis** (1–2)	Clase (6)	6,919	16–11	L2
28	May 4	Indians	3–7	Wittgren (1–1)	**Staumont** (0–1)	—	5,997	16–12	L3
29	May 5	Indians	4–5	Wittgren (2–1)	**Davis** (0–1)	Karinchak (3)	9,640	16–13	L4
30	May 6	Indians	0–4	McKenzie (1–1)	**Duffy** (4–2)	—	9,259	16–14	L5
31	May 7	White Sox	0–3	Rodón (5–0)	**Keller** (2–4)	Hendriks (6)	16,011	16–15	L6
32	May 8	White Sox	1–9	Lynn (3–1)	**Lynch** (0–1)	—	15,895	16–16	L7
33	May 9	White Sox	3–9	Giolito (2–3)	**Minor** (2–2)	—	12,102	16–17	L8
34	May 11	@ Tigers	7–8	Soto (3–1)	**Barlow** (1–1)	—	7,312	16–18	L9
35	May 12	@ Tigers	2–4	Mize (2–3)	**Duffy** (4–3)	Soto (4)	7,133	16–19	L10
36	May 13	@ Tigers	3–4	Turnbull (2–2)	**Lynch** (0–2)	Fulmer (2)	7,369	16–20	L11
37	May 14 (1)	@ White Sox	6–2 (7)	**Keller** (3–4)	Giolito (2–4)	—	8,574	17–20	W1
38	May 14 (2)	@ White Sox	1–3 (7)	Heuer (3–1)	**Junis** (1–3)	Hendriks (8)	9,823	17–21	L1
39	May 15	@ White Sox	5–1	**Minor** (3–2)	Rodón (5–1)	—	9,886	18–21	W1
40	May 16	@ White Sox	3–4	Foster (2–1)	**Davis** (0–2)	—	9,928	18–22	L1
41	May 18	Brewers	2–0	**Brentz** (1–0)	Woodruff (2–2)	**Staumont** (4)	9,298	19–22	W1
42	May 19	Brewers	6–4	**Barlow** (2–1)	Feyereisen (0–2)	**Staumont** (5)	8,950	20–22	W2
43	May 21	Tigers	5–7	Ureña (2–4)	**Zuber** (0–1)	Fulmer (4)	17,080	20–23	L1
44	May 22	Tigers	7–5	**Singer** (2–3)	Boyd (2–5)	—	14,226	21–23	W1
45	May 23	Tigers	3–2	**Zimmer** (3–0)	Fulmer (3–3)	—	15,540	22–23	W2
46	May 25	@ Rays	2–1	**Keller** (4–4)	Hill (3–2)	**Zimmer** (2)	4,946	23–23	W3
47	May 26	@ Rays	1–2 (10)	Feyereisen (1–2)	**Zuber** (0–2)	—	4,973	23–24	L1
48	May 27	@ Rays	2–7	McClanahan (2–0)	**Singer** (2–4)	—	5,519	23–25	L2
49	May 28	@ Twins	8–3	**Bubic** (1–0)	Dobnak (1–4)	—	14,260	24–25	W1
50	May 29	@ Twins	5–6	Happ (3–2)	**Santana** (0–1)	Rogers (4)	18,444	24–26	L1
51	May 30	@ Twins	6–3	**Keller** (5–4)	Shoemaker (2–6)	**Holland** (3)	17,923	25–26	W1
52	May 31	Pirates	7–3	**Minor** (4–2)	Kuhl (0–2)	—	12,604	26–26	W2

June: 7–20 (Home: 5–6; Away: 2–14)

#	Date	Opponent	Score	Win	Loss	Save	Attendance	Record	Streak
53	June 1	Pirates	10–5	**Singer** (3–4)	Crowe (0–4)	—	10,333	27–26	W3
54	June 3	Twins	6–5	**Junis** (2–3)	Robles (1–2)	**Barlow** (2)	11,072	28–26	W4
55	June 4	Twins	14–5	**Keller** (6–4)	Shoemaker (2–7)	—	22,612	29–26	W5
56	June 5	Twins	4–5	Berríos (6–2)	**Minor** (4–3)	Robles (5)	21,574	29–27	L1
57	June 6	Twins	1–2	Farrell (1–0)	**Singer** (3–5)	Rogers (5)	14,046	29–28	L2
58	June 7	@ Angels	3–8	Bundy (1–6)	**Kowar** (0–1)	—	9,481	29–29	L3
59	June 8	@ Angels	1–8	Heaney (4–3)	**Bubic** (1–1)	—	9,387	29–30	L4
60	June 9	@ Angels	1–6	Canning (5–4)	**Keller** (6–5)	—	10,474	29–31	L5
61	June 10	@ Athletics	6–1	**Minor** (5–3)	Montas (6–6)	—	3,211	30–31	W1
62	June 11	@ Athletics	3–4	Trivino (3–2)	**Barlow** (2–2)	—	6,964	30–32	L1
63	June 12	@ Athletics	2–11	Kaprielian (3–1)	**Kowar** (0–1)	—	7,678	30–33	L2
64	June 13	@ Athletics	3–6	Bassitt (7–2)	**Bubic** (1–2)	Trivino (10)	7,060	30–34	L3
65	June 14	Tigers	3–10	Jiménez (2–0)	**Keller** (6–6)	—	11,910	30–35	L4
66	June 15	Tigers	3–4	Mize (4–4)	**Minor** (5–4)	Soto (6)	15,947	30–36	L5
67	June 16	Tigers	5–6	Skubal (4–7)	**Holland** (2–2)	Fulmer (5)	11,327	30–37	L6
68	June 18	Red Sox	5–3	**Bubic** (2–2)	Pivetta (6–3)	**Holland** (4)	29,870	31–37	W1
69	June 19	Red Sox	1–7	Pérez (5–4)	**Keller** (6–7)	—	24,568	31–38	L1
70	June 20	Red Sox	7–3	**Minor** (6–4)	Eovaldi (7–4)	—	20,726	32–38	W1
71	June 22	@ Yankees	6–5	**Brentz** (2–0)	Loáisiga (7–3)	**Holland** (5)	21,130	33–38	W2
72	June 23	@ Yankees	5–6	Chapman (5–2)	**Holland** (2–3)	—	25,032	33–39	L1
73	June 24	@ Yankees	1–8	Taillon (2–4)	**Keller** (6–8)	—	21,350	33–40	L2
74	June 25	@ Rangers	4–9	Dunning (3–6)	**Minor** (6–5)	—	30,389	33–41	L3
75	June 26	@ Rangers	0–8	Gibson (6–0)	**Bubic** (2–3)	—	31,612	33–42	L4
76	June 27	@ Rangers	1–4	Lyles (3–5)	**Singer** (3–6)	Kennedy (13)	29,046	33–43	L5
77	June 28	@ Red Sox	5–6	Sawamura (4–0)	**Staumont** (0–2)	Barnes (17)	22,766	33–44	L6
78	June 29	@ Red Sox	6–7	Ríos (2–0)	**Brentz** (2–1)	Barnes (18)	25,180	33–45	L7
79	June 30	@ Red Sox	2–6	Pérez (6–4)	**Minor** (6–6)	—	24,616	33–46	L8

July: 12–12 (Home: 10–6; Away: 2–6)

#	Date	Opponent	Score	Win	Loss	Save	Attendance	Record	Streak
80	July 1	@ Red Sox	1–15	Eovaldi (9–4)	**Bubic** (2–4)	—	27,913	33–47	L9
81	July 2	Twins	7–4	**Lovelady** (1–0)	Happ (4–4)	**Barlow** (3)	31,824	34–47	W1
82	July 3	Twins	6–3	**Zimmer** (4–0)	Jax (1–1)	**Barlow** (4)	16,133	35–47	W2
83	July 4	Twins	2–6	Maeda (4–3)	**Keller** (6–9)	—	15,350	35–48	L1
84	July 5	Reds	2–6	Gutiérrez (4–3)	**Minor** (6–7)	—	14,709	35–49	L2
85	July 6	Reds	7–6	**Lovelady** (2–0)	Hembree (2–4)	—	14,491	36–49	W1
86	July 7	Reds	2–5	Gray (2–4)	**Barlow** (2–3)	Hembree (4)	11,457	36–50	L1
87	July 8	@ Indians	4–7	Karinchak (5–2)	**Holland** (2–4)	—	13,272	36–51	L2
88	July 9	@ Indians	1–2	Karinchak (6–2)	**Brentz** (2–2)	—	21,395	36–52	L3
89	July 10	@ Indians	6–14	Quantrill (1–2)	**Minor** (6–8)	—	24,077	36–53	L4
—	July 11	@ Indians	Postponed (Rain, Makeup September 20)						
**91st All-Star Game in Denver, Colorado**
90	July 16	Orioles	9–2	**Staumont** (1–2)	Akin (0–5)	—	23,763	37–53	W1
91	July 17	Orioles	4–8	Fry (3–3)	**Singer** (3–7)	—	27,292	37–54	L1
92	July 18	Orioles	0–5	Harvey (4–10)	**Hernández** (1–1)	—	13,706	37–55	L2
93	July 20	@ Brewers	5–2	**Minor** (7–8)	Strickland (0–1)	**Holland** (6)	20,140	38–55	W1
94	July 21	@ Brewers	6–3	**Keller** (7–9)	Suter (9–5)	**Barlow** (5)	30,063	39–55	W2
95	July 23	Tigers	5–3	**Bubic** (3–4)	Peralta (3–2)	**Holland** (7)	24,912	40–55	W3
96	July 24	Tigers	9–8	**Brentz** (3–2)	Funkhouser (4–1)	**Davis** (2)	24,616	41–55	W4
97	July 25	Tigers	6–1	**Lynch** (1–2)	Skubal (6–9)	—	12,703	42–55	W5
98	July 26	White Sox	4–3	**Minor** (8–8)	Keuchel (7–4)	**Barlow** (6)	12,384	43–55	W6
99	July 27	White Sox	3–5	López (1–0)	**Zimmer** (4–1)	Hendriks (25)	14,298	43–56	L1
100	July 28	White Sox	3–2 (10)	**Barlow** (3–3)	Burr (2–1)	—	13,626	44–56	W1
101	July 29	White Sox	5–0	**Hernández** (2–1)	Rodón (8–5)	—	11,210	45–56	W2
102	July 30	@ Blue Jays	4–6	Stripling (4–6)	**Lynch** (1–3)	Romano (9)	13,446	45–57	L1
103	July 31	@ Blue Jays	0–4	Manoah (3–1)	**Minor** (8–9)	—	13,953	45–58	L2

August: 14–14 (Home: 4–7; Away: 10–7)

#	Date	Opponent	Score	Win	Loss	Save	Attendance	Record	Streak
104	August 1	@ Blue Jays	1–5	Berríos (8–5)	**Keller** (7–10)	—	14,427	45–59	L3
105	August 3	@ White Sox	1–7	Cease (8–6)	**Bubic** (3–5)	—	19,369	45–60	L4
106	August 4	@ White Sox	9–1	**Hernández** (3–1)	Giolito (8–8)	—	22,793	46–60	W1
107	August 5	@ White Sox	3–2	**Lynch** (2–3)	Keuchel (7–5)	**Brentz** (1)	23,589	47–60	W2
108	August 6	@ Cardinals	2–4	Wainwright (10–6)	**Minor** (8–10)	Reyes (25)	29,090	47–61	L1
109	August 7	@ Cardinals	2–5	García (1–0)	**Keller** (7–11)	Gallegos (2)	36,615	47–62	L2
110	August 8	@ Cardinals	6–5	**Barlow** (4–3)	Reyes (5–5)	**Lovelady** (1)	31,943	48–62	W1
111	August 9	Yankees	6–8 (11)	Holmes (4–2)	**Holland** (2–5)	Peralta (3)	18,477	48–63	L1
112	August 10	Yankees	8–4	**Staumont** (2–2)	Cortés Jr. (0–1)	—	18,218	49–63	W1
113	August 11	Yankees	2–5	Green (6–5)	**Singer** (3–8)	Britton (1)	13,748	49–64	L1
114	August 13	Cardinals	0–6	Flaherty (9–1)	**Minor** (8–11)	—	30,620	49–65	L2
115	August 14	Cardinals	4–9	Lester (4–6)	**Keller** (7–12)	—	35,784	49–66	L3
116	August 15	Cardinals	2–7	Happ (7–6)	**Bubic** (3–6)	—	18,317	49–67	L4
117	August 16	Astros	7–6	**Barlow** (5–3)	García (3–8)	—	10,228	50–67	W1
118	August 17	Astros	3–1	**Lynch** (3–3)	Valdez (8–4)	**Brentz** (2)	9,748	51–67	W2
119	August 18	Astros	3–2	**Tapia** (1–0)	Taylor (2–4)	**Barlow** (7)	12,278	52–67	W3
120	August 19	Astros	3–6 (10)	Pressly (5–1)	**Davis** (0–3)	Javier (2)	9,884	52–68	L1
121	August 20	@ Cubs	6–2	**Keller** (8–12)	Davies (6–10)	—	31,835	53–68	W1
122	August 21	@ Cubs	4–2	**Bubic** (4–6)	Thompson (3–3)	**Barlow** (8)	34,005	54–68	W2
123	August 22	@ Cubs	9–1	**Hernández** (4–1)	Mills (5–6)	—	29,640	55–68	W3
124	August 23	@ Astros	7–1	**Lynch** (4–3)	Greinke (11–4)	—	18,742	56–68	W4
125	August 24	@ Astros	0–4	García (10–6)	**Singer** (3–9)	—	22,964	56–69	L1
126	August 25	@ Astros	5–6 (10)	Graveman (5–0)	**Payamps** (0–3)	—	21,052	56–70	L2
127	August 26	@ Mariners	6–4	**Santana** (1–1)	Smith (2–2)	**Barlow** (9)	16,882	57–70	W1
128	August 27	@ Mariners	8–7 (12)	**Staumont** (3–2)	Ramírez (0–2)	—	22,953	58–70	W2
129	August 28	@ Mariners	4–2	**Payamps** (1–3)	Anderson (6–9)	**Barlow** (10)	24,575	59–70	W3
130	August 29	@ Mariners	3–4	Gonzales (6–5)	**Zuber** (0–3)	Steckenrider (7)	20,044	59–71	L1
131	August 31	Indians	2–7	Plesac (9–4)	**Junis** (2–4)	—	11,542	59–72	L2

September: 14–14 (Home: 6–8; Away: 8–6)

#	Date	Opponent	Score	Win	Loss	Save	Attendance	Record	Streak
132	September 1	Indians	3–5 (11)	Parker (2–0)	**Santana** (1–2)	Stephan (1)	10,516	59–73	L3
133	September 2	Indians	2–4	McKenzie (4–5)	**Minor** (8–12)	Clase (20)	10,042	59–74	L4
134	September 3	White Sox	7–2	**Hernández** (5–1)	Keuchel (8–8)	—	14,210	60–74	W1
135	September 4	White Sox	7–10	Kimbrel (3–4)	**Lynch** (4–4)	Hendriks (32)	18,800	60–75	L1
136	September 5	White Sox	6–0	**Singer** (4–9)	Cease (11–7)	—	19,696	61–75	W1
137	September 6	@ Orioles	3–2	**Tapia** (2–0)	Sulser (4–4)	**Barlow** (11)	11,973	62–75	W2
138	September 7	@ Orioles	3–7	Baumann (1–0)	**Kowar** (0–3)	—	4,981	62–76	L1
139	September 8	@ Orioles	8–9	Barreda (1–0)	**Staumont** (3–3)	Wells (2)	4,965	62–77	L2
140	September 9	@ Orioles	6–0	**Hernández** (6–1)	Means (5–7)	—	5,087	63–77	W1
141	September 10	@ Twins	6–4 (11)	**Santana** (2–2)	Minaya (2–1)	**Holland** (8)	20,803	64–77	W2
142	September 11	@ Twins	2–9	Pineda (6–8)	**Singer** (4–10)	—	19,532	64–78	L1
143	September 12	@ Twins	5–3	**Brentz** (4–2)	Alcalá (3–6)	**Barlow** (12)	19,496	65–78	W1
144	September 14	Athletics	10–7	**Brentz** (5–2)	Petit (8–2)	**Barlow** (13)	10,254	66–78	W2
145	September 15	Athletics	10–12	Manaea (10–9)	**Hernández** (6–2)	Chafin (4)	11,056	66–79	L1
146	September 16	Athletics	2–7	Blackburn (1–2)	**Lynch** (4–5)	—	11,729	66–80	L2
147	September 17	Mariners	2–6	Flexen (12–6)	**Heasley** (0–1)	—	14,904	66–81	L3
148	September 18	Mariners	8–1	**Bubic** (5–6)	Kikuchi (7–9)	—	20,085	67–81	W1
149	September 19	Mariners	1–7	Gilbert (6–5)	**Kowar** (0–4)	—	16,872	67–82	L1
150	September 20 (1)	@ Indians	7–2 (7)	**Singer** (5–10)	McKenzie (5–7)	—	N/A	68–82	W1
151	September 20 (2)	@ Indians	4–2 (7)	**Tapia** (3–0)	Wittgren (2–8)	**Barlow** (14)	11,459	69–82	W2
152	September 21	@ Indians	1–4	Quantrill (7–3)	**Lynch** (4–6)	Clase (24)	23,341	69–83	L1
—	September 22	@ Indians	Postponed (rain, makeup September 27)						
153	September 24	@ Tigers	3–1	**Tapia** (4–0)	Lange (0–3)	**Barlow** (15)	24,877	70–83	W1
154	September 25	@ Tigers	1–5	Hutchison (3–1)	**Tapia** (4–1)	Fulmer (12)	16,424	70–84	L1
155	September 26	@ Tigers	2–1	**Bubic** (6–6)	Peralta (4–4)	**Barlow** (16)	23,788	71–84	W1
156	September 27	@ Indians	3–8	Quantrill (8–3)	**Kowar** (0–5)	—	13,121	71–85	L1
157	September 28	Indians	6–4	**Staumont** (4–3)	Parker (2–1)	—	11,670	72–85	W1
158	September 29	Indians	10–5	**Holland** (3–5)	Wittgren (2–9)	—	10,373	73–85	W2
159	September 30	Indians	1–6	Allen (2–7)	**Zerpa** (0–1)	—	11,288	73–86	L1

October: 1–2 (Home: 1–2; Away: 0–0)

#	Date	Opponent	Score	Win	Loss	Save	Attendance	Record	Streak
160	October 1	Twins	11–6	**Heasley** (1–1)	Gant (5–11)	—	14,293	74–86	W1
161	October 2	Twins	0–4	Jax (4–5)	**Bubic** (6–7)	—	22,321	74–87	L1
162	October 3	Twins	3–7	Vincent (1–0)	**Kowar** (0–6)	Alcalá (1)	17,158	74–88	L2

Legend: = Win = Loss = Postponement
Bold = Royals team member

== Roster ==
2021 Kansas City Royals
Roster
Pitchers: 58 Scott Barlow; 64 Scott Blewett; 57 Ronald Bolaños; 59 Jake Brentz; 50 Kris Bubic; 65 Dylan Coleman; 71 Wade Davis; 30 Danny Duffy; 32 Jesse Hahn; 85 Jon Heasley; 43 Carlos Hernández; 35 Greg Holland; 24 Jake Junis; 56 Brad Keller; 37 Jackson Kowar; 55 Richard Lovelady; 52 Daniel Lynch; 23 Mike Minor; 68 Jake Newberry; 38 Joel Payamps; 54 Ervin Santana; 51 Brady Singer; 67 Gabe Speier; 63 Josh Staumont; 38 Anthony Swarzak; 31 Domingo Tapia; 61 Ángel Zerpa; 45 Kyle Zimmer; 53 Tyler Zuber	Catchers: 36 Cam Gallagher; 13 Salvador Pérez; 48 Sebastian Rivero; Infielders: 49 Hanser Alberto; 19 Kelvin Gutiérrez; 8 Nicky Lopez; 15 Whit Merrifield; 27 Adalberto Mondesí; 26 Emmanuel Rivera; 41 Carlos Santana	Outfielders: 16 Andrew Benintendi; 17 Hunter Dozier; 1 Jarrod Dyson; 28 Kyle Isbel; 66 Ryan O'Hearn; 14 Edward Olivares; 12 Jorge Soler; 2 Michael A. Taylor; Other batters: 9 Ryan McBroom	Manager: 22 Mike Matheny; Coaches: 44 Terry Bradshaw (hitting); 34 Larry Carter (bullpen); -- Bill Duplissea (Replay Coordinator); 80 Ryan Eigsti (bullpen catcher); 21 Cal Eldred (pitching); 6 Pedro Grifol (bench); 18 Rusty Kuntz (first base); 47 John Mabry (coach); 70 Parker Morin (bullpen catcher); 39 Tony Peña Jr. (infield); 25 Vance Wilson (third base)

== Player stats ==
=== Batting ===
Note: G = Games played; AB = At bats; R = Runs; H = Hits; 2B = Doubles; 3B = Triples; HR = Home runs; RBI = Runs batted in; SB = Stolen bases; BB = Walks; AVG = Batting average; SLG = Slugging average

Player	G	AB	R	H	2B	3B	HR	RBI	SB	BB	AVG	SLG
Whit Merrifield	162	664	97	184	42	3	10	74	40	40	.277	.395
Salvador Pérez	161	620	88	169	24	0	48	121	1	28	.273	.544
Carlos Santana	158	565	66	121	15	0	19	69	2	86	.214	.342
Nicky Lopez	151	497	78	149	21	6	2	43	22	49	.300	.378
Andrew Benintendi	134	493	63	136	27	2	17	73	8	36	.276	.442
Hunter Dozier	144	487	55	105	27	6	16	54	5	43	.216	.394
Michael A. Taylor	142	483	58	118	16	1	12	54	14	33	.244	.356
Jorge Soler	94	308	38	59	16	0	13	37	0	38	.192	.370
Hanser Alberto	103	241	25	65	20	3	2	24	3	4	.270	.402
Ryan O'Hearn	84	236	23	53	5	1	9	29	0	13	.225	.369
Kelvin Gutiérrez	38	135	9	29	4	2	1	8	0	6	.215	.296
Adalberto Mondesí	35	126	19	29	8	1	6	17	15	6	.230	.452
Jarrod Dyson	77	122	13	27	7	2	0	10	8	6	.221	.311
Cam Gallagher	48	112	9	28	6	0	1	7	0	8	.250	.330
Edward Olivares	39	101	14	24	2	0	5	12	2	5	.238	.406
Emmanuel Rivera	29	90	13	23	4	0	1	5	2	8	.256	.333
Kyle Isbel	28	76	16	21	5	2	1	7	2	7	.276	.434
Sebastian Rivero	17	40	1	7	2	0	0	3	0	3	.175	.225
Ryan McBroom	7	8	1	2	0	0	0	0	0	1	.250	.250
Pitcher totals	162	23	0	0	0	0	0	0	0	1	.000	.000
Team totals	162	5427	686	1349	251	29	163	647	124	421	.249	.396

Source:2021 Kansas City Royals Batting Statistics

=== Pitching ===
Note: W = Wins; L = Losses; ERA = Earned run average; G = Games pitched; GS = Games starting; SV = Saves; IP = Innings pitched; H = Hits allowed; R = Runs allowed; ER = Earned runs allowed; BB = Walks allowed; SO = Strikeouts

Player	W	L	ERA	G	GS	SV	IP	H	R	ER	BB	SO
Mike Minor	8	12	5.05	28	28	0	158.2	156	92	89	41	149
Brad Keller	8	12	5.39	26	26	0	133.2	158	89	80	64	120
Kris Bubic	6	7	4.43	29	20	0	130.0	121	67	64	59	114
Brady Singer	5	10	4.91	27	27	0	128.1	146	81	70	53	131
Carlos Hernández	6	2	3.68	24	11	0	85.2	69	36	35	41	74
Scott Barlow	5	3	2.42	71	0	16	74.1	61	20	20	28	91
Daniel Lynch	4	6	5.69	15	15	0	68.0	80	46	43	31	55
Josh Staumont	4	3	2.88	64	0	5	65.2	43	24	21	27	72
Ervin Santana	2	2	4.68	38	2	0	65.1	65	35	34	22	52
Jake Brentz	5	2	3.66	72	0	2	64.0	45	32	26	37	76
Danny Duffy	4	3	2.51	13	12	0	61.0	52	19	17	22	65
Greg Holland	3	5	4.85	57	0	8	55.2	49	32	30	26	53
Kyle Zimmer	4	1	4.83	52	2	2	54.0	46	32	29	30	46
Wade Davis	0	3	6.75	40	0	2	42.2	44	33	32	19	38
Jakob Junis	2	4	5.26	16	6	0	39.1	43	24	23	12	41
Domingo Tapia	4	1	2.84	32	0	0	31.2	21	10	10	14	25
Jackson Kowar	0	6	11.27	9	8	0	30.1	43	38	38	20	29
Tyler Zuber	0	3	6.26	31	0	0	27.1	26	20	19	17	25
Richard Lovelady	2	0	3.48	20	0	1	20.2	16	9	8	6	23
Joel Payamps	1	1	4.43	15	1	0	20.1	23	12	10	3	16
Jonathan Heasley	1	1	4.91	3	3	0	14.2	15	8	8	3	6
Anthony Swarzak	0	0	9.39	7	0	0	7.2	13	8	8	0	5
Gabe Speier	0	0	1.17	7	0	0	7.2	10	3	1	0	5
Dylan Coleman	0	0	1.42	5	0	0	6.1	5	1	1	1	7
Ronald Bolaños	0	0	1.42	3	0	0	6.1	4	1	1	2	10
Ángel Zerpa	0	1	0.00	1	1	0	5.0	3	2	0	1	4
Scott Blewett	0	0	1.80	3	0	0	5.0	3	1	1	5	4
Jake Newberry	0	0	16.62	4	0	0	4.1	10	8	8	3	5
Jesse Hahn	0	0	13.50	5	0	1	3.1	5	5	5	4	3
Hanser Alberto	0	0	0.00	1	0	0	0.1	0	0	0	0	0
Team totals	74	88	4.64	162	162	37	1417.1	1375	788	731	591	1344

Source:2021 Kansas City Royals Pitching Statistics

== Farm system ==
Level	Team	League	Manager
Triple-A	Omaha Storm Chasers	Triple-A East	Brian Poldberg
Double-A	Northwest Arkansas Naturals	Double-A Central	Scott Thorman
High-A	Quad Cities River Bandits	High-A Central	Chris Widger
Low-A	Columbia Fireflies	Low-A East	Brooks Conrad
Rookie	ACL Royals Blue	Arizona Complex League	Omar Ramirez
Rookie	ACL Royals Gold	Arizona Complex League	Andre David
Rookie	DSL Royals Blue	Dominican Summer League	Ramon Martinez
