= La Jolla High School =

Public school in San Diego, California, United States

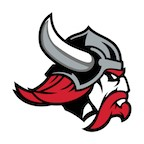

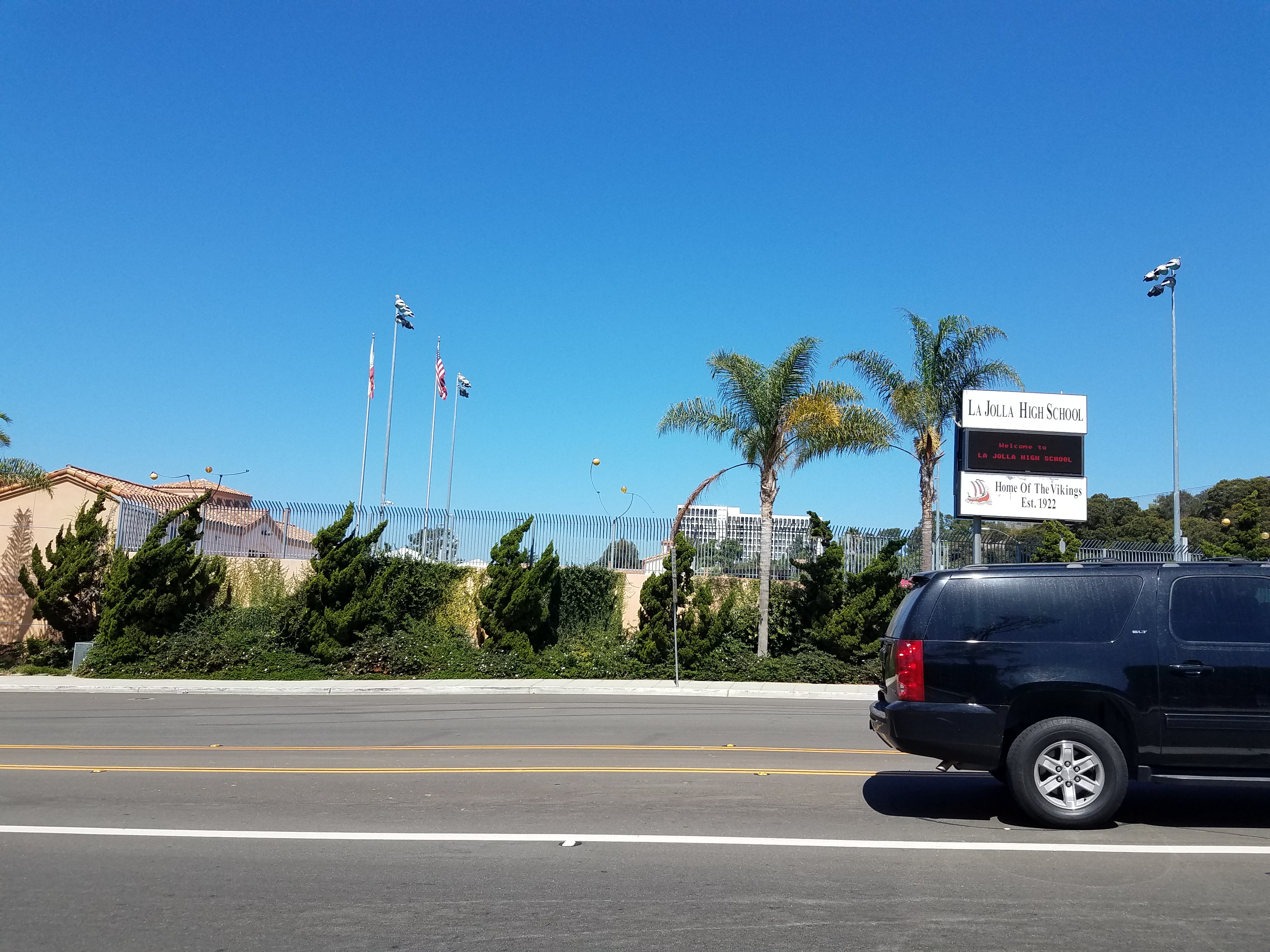

Location
- 799 Westbourne St; La Jolla, California 92037; 32.833°N 117.273°W

Information
- Type: Public school
- Established: 1922
- Principal: Chuck Podhorsky
- Staff: 47.91 (FTE)
- Enrollment: 1,213 (2023-2024)
- Student to teacher ratio: 25.32
- Colors: Black and red
- Mascot: Viking
- Website: www.sandiegounified.org/schools/la-jolla

La Jolla High School (LJHS) is a public high school in La Jolla, a district of the city of San Diego, California. Opened in 1922, LJHS is the second-oldest campus in San Diego Unified School District. It is accredited by the Western Association of Schools and Colleges (WASC).

LJHS was named a California Distinguished School in 2003. It is recognized as an Advancement Via Individual Determination (AVID) School of Distinction. LJHS was the first public high school west of the Mississippi to earn a chapter in the Cum Laude Society.

== Institution ==
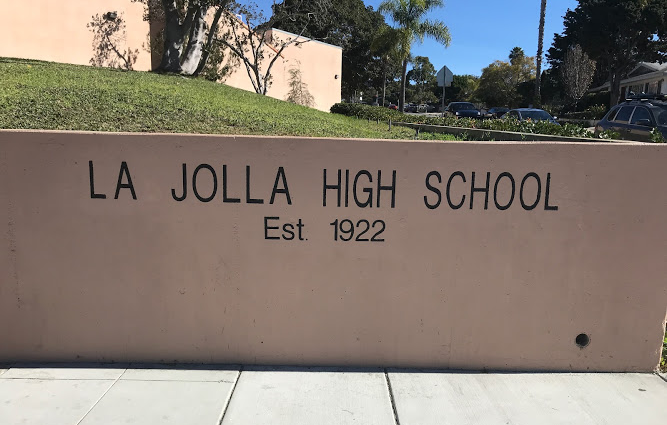

=== PTSA ===
In 1997, former principal Dana Shelburne discontinued LJHS's controversial PTSA (then "PTA") Volunteer Hours program. The program, which was reportedly not put in writing until 1996, allowed PTA parents who volunteered over 75 hours to exercise specific control over their students' schedule and teachers. A PTA brochure said the program allowed parents to create a "dream schedule" for their child. The program was terminated following heavy criticism from parents whose students were enrolled in SDUSD's Voluntary Enrollment Exchange Program, a voluntary school busing program. Shelburne said that the program was shut down due to "the bookkeeping burden on the PTA and lack of benefit."

=== The Foundation ===
The Foundation is the fundraising organization for LJHS. Funds raised by the Foundation have been used to fund full-time faculty positions, security cameras, robotics class equipment, technology, textbooks and fiction books, teachers' professional development conference registration, academic league and team competition fees, athletic facility improvements, athletic trainer, and coaching fees among others. The LJHS Foundation fulfills a complementary, but distinct, role from the PTSA by raising funds for high-priority programs that are not fully funded by the SDUSD, as determined by the administration, site governance, and academic department chairs.

=== Site governance ===
The Site Governance team meets on the first Monday of each month. It consists of the following nineteen members: the principal; eight certificated staff representatives; one San Diego Education Association site representative; one classified representative; five parent representatives; one community representative; and two student representatives. Agenda items, which can be submitted by anyone, are turned in to the elected chair prior to the meeting. The role of the Governance Committee is to provide a forum for examination of issues relating to LJHS. The development, implementation, and evaluation of programs and policies of LJHS fall within the purview of the Governance Committee. The School Site Counsel meets after Site Governance, and some members are in both groups.

== Data ==
=== Demographics ===
In 2015, LJHS had about 1,500 students in grades 9-12, supported by 109 staff members (a principal, 2 vice principals, 67 credentialed teachers, 2 visiting community college professors, 4 counselors, a nurse, a psychologist, a librarian, a media tech, 6 custodial staff, a landscaper, and other support staff).

LJHS has two NBCTs (National Board Certified Teachers) in its English Department, and numerous AP (Advanced Placement) instructors in English, Computer Science, Social Science, and Science Departments who serve as Readers or Table Leaders for the annual AP Exams, which are designed by the College Board to measure student achievement in college-level classes and administered by the Educational Testing Service (ETS). All LJHS teachers have a valid credential for the subjects they teach, and SDUSD has certified the site as 100 percent No Child Left Behind (NCLB) compliant.

Caucasian students make up a little more than half of the student population, and Hispanic students comprise the largest minority population.

LJHS is made up of 61% residential students and 39% nonresidential. Of the approximately 1,500 students currently enrolled at LJHS, 24% are eligible for free or reduced lunch. Various students are enrolled in Voluntary Ethnic Enrollment Plan (VEEP), CHOICE, Program Improvement School Choice (PISC), NCLB, and special education programs. LJHS does not receive any Title I funds.

=== Discipline, dropout and graduation rates ===
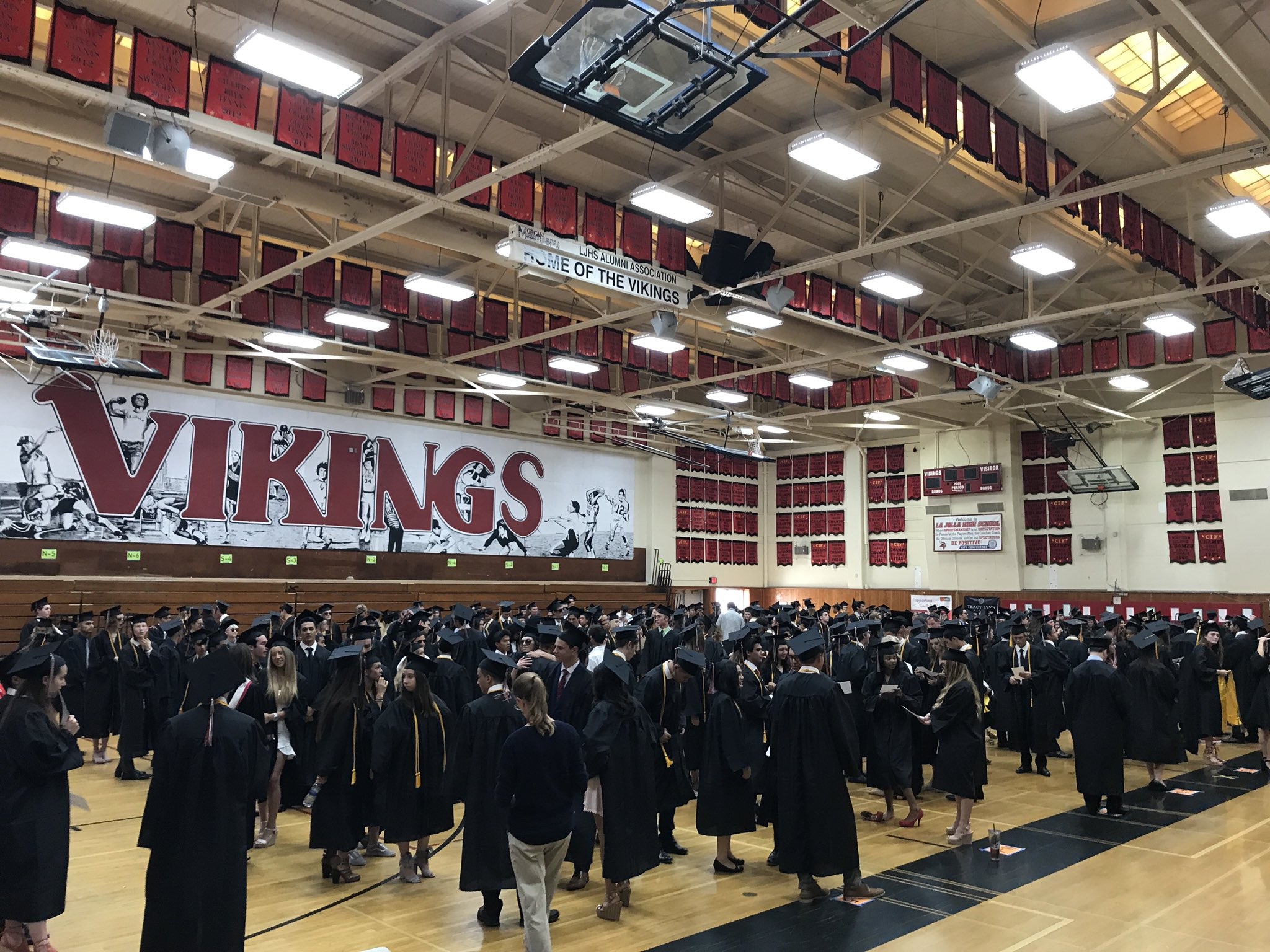
LJHS seniors line up for 2018 graduation in Big Gym

LJHS's suspension rate is low, at about 3% for the 2021-2022 school year. The main reasons (about 50%) are due to minor disruptions in the classroom. The other 50% of suspensions include reasons such as fighting, alcohol/drug/tobacco possession and/or use, and stolen property. The dropout rate is 1%.

Students graduating with UC "a-g" credits increased from 70.7% to 79.4% in 2013–2014, the most recent year recorded by SDUSD. Class of 2016 students will be required to pass the "a-g" requirements for graduation.

=== Assessment and testing ===
The most recent testing data is available on the California Department of Education website. The CST Standards Assessment and Reporting system was phased out in the 2014–15 school year and replaced with the new California Assessment of Student Performance and Progress (CAASP). The CAASPs are summative assessments for all 11th graders in English Language Arts and Mathematics to measure their achievement in the Common Core State Standards (CCSS). On La Jolla's 2018 performance on the CA School Dashboard, LJHS 11th graders scored 78.6 above the standard for Math and English Language arts, a 21.8 point increase from 2017.

A more comprehensive breakdown of testing statistics related to English Language Learners, students receiving SpED services, socioeconomically disadvantaged students, and other subgroups can be found on the Mid-Cycle Review WASC document published on the LJHS website.

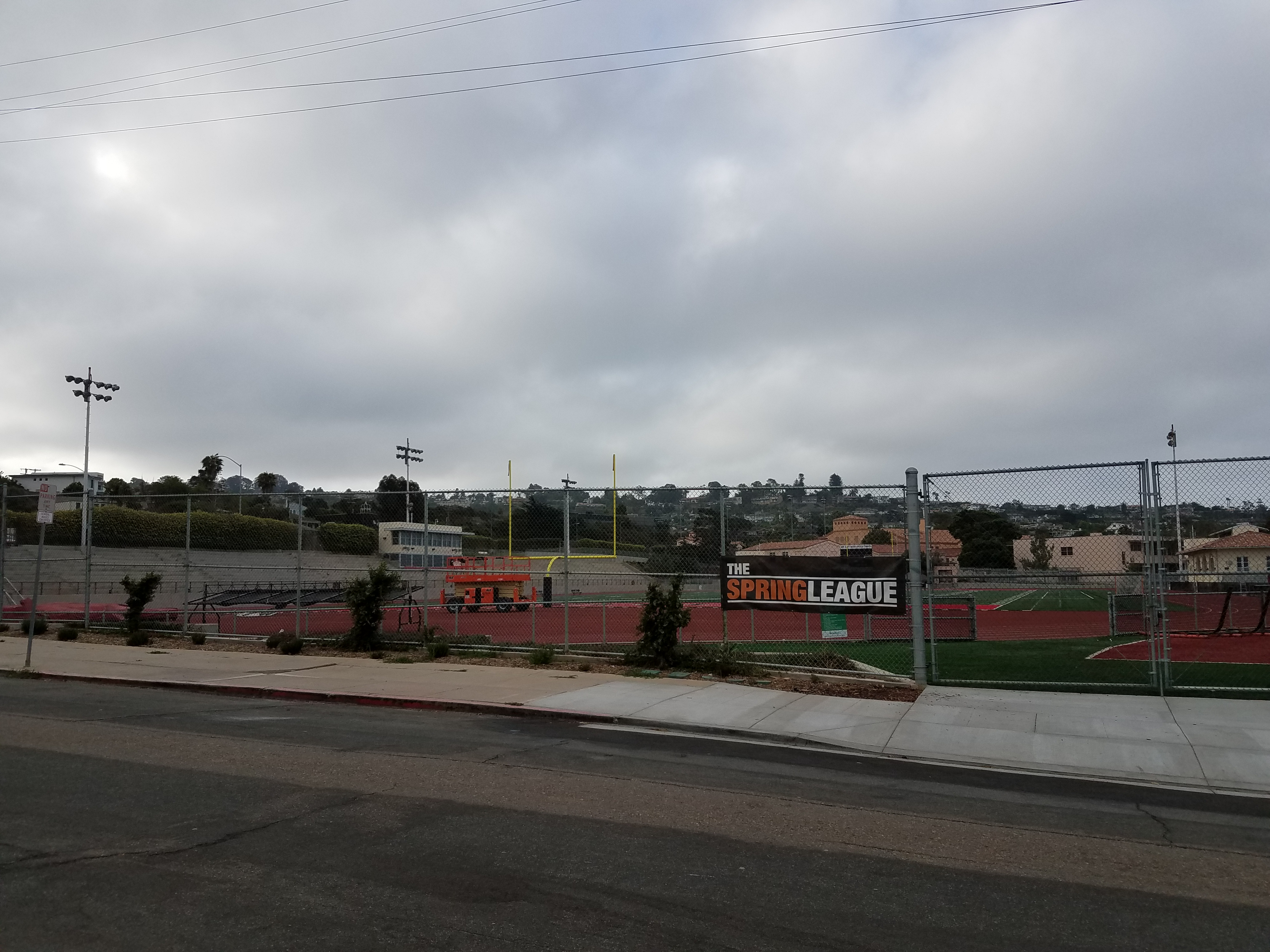
La Jolla High School Stadium

== Academics ==
All LJHS classes have a hard cap of 36 students per class. However, certain AP courses and other classes are filled above capacity.

In 2015, the number of seminar-identified students in grades 9-12 was 234. The number of students enrolled in a seminar-identified class was 152. There are no seminar classes for 12th grade, as seniors are expected to take AP's or college-level classes such Political Science (offered through Mesa Community College) on the LJHS campus.

Each year, approximately 72% of LJHS students attend four-year universities, with a significant number of students attending Ivy League schools, out-of-state institutions, and the University of California and California State University systems, an additional 20% of students attend 2 year community colleges for a total of 92% seeking higher education right after graduation.

Beginning with the 2019–20 school year, LJHS, along with Muirlands Middle School and the San Diego School of Creative and Performing Arts, is piloting a new late start program for the San Diego Unified School District, with first period at 8:35 am (rather than the previous 7:25 am), with the stated purpose of increasing attendance, test scores, and graduation rates. Muirlands Middle Principal Geof Martin has also stated that "In addition, healthy start times lead to decreased rates of emotional and behavioral problems, including anxiety and depression, along with corresponding increases in social, academic and athletic performance".

In 2013–2014, La Jolla High School did not meet the Adequate Yearly Progress criteria mandated under the federal Elementary and Secondary Education Act (ESEA), with an insufficient percentage of students proficient in Mathematics. LJHS did meet each of the other four criteria.

== Incidents ==
=== 2012 ACLU settlement ===
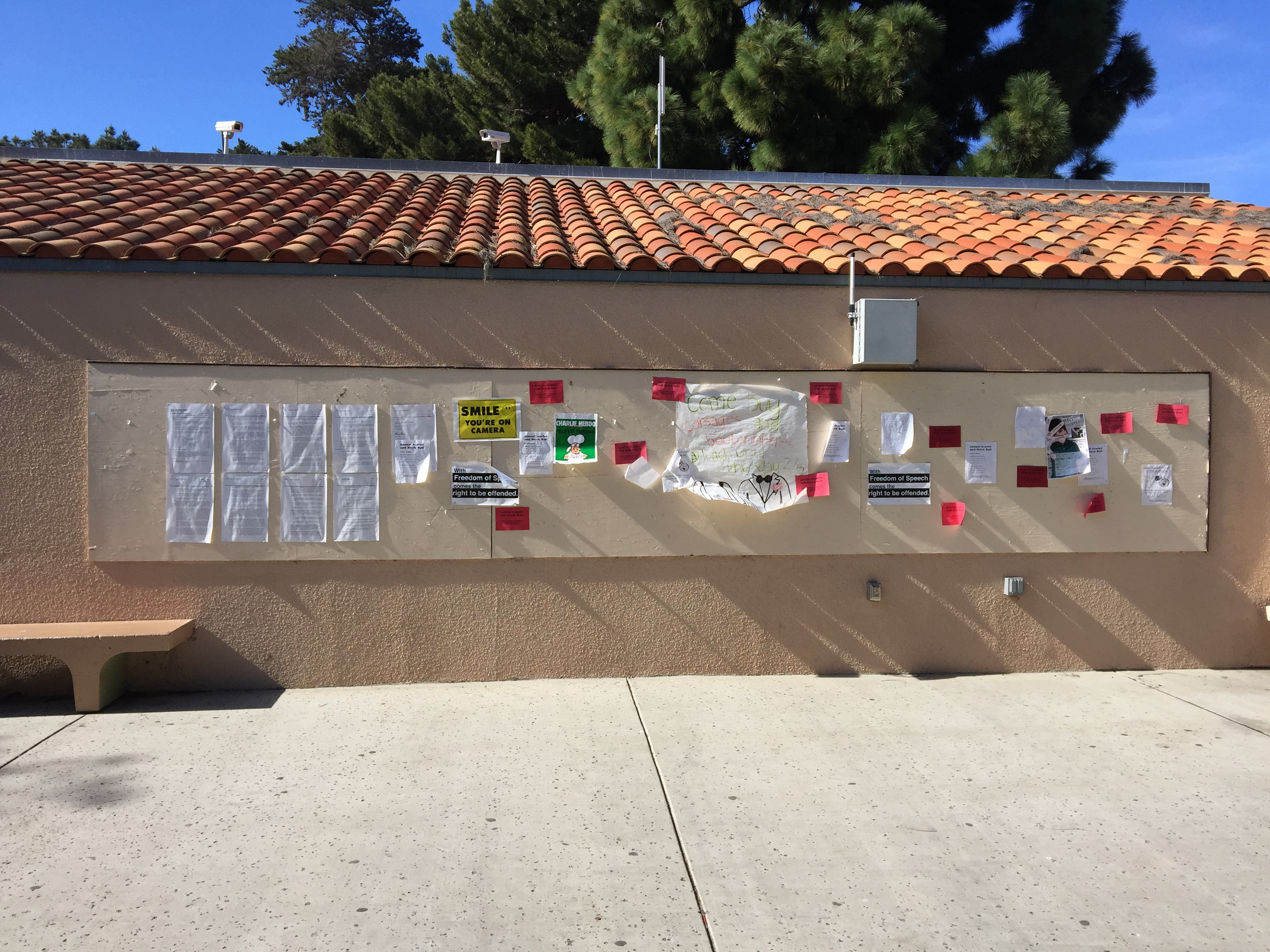
La Jolla High School Free Speech Board as of February 2, 2015.

On February 17, 2012, a former LJHS student represented by the ACLU of San Diego & Imperial Counties agreed to a settlement with the San Diego Unified School District that required the district and LJHS to adopt stronger free speech protections for students. The settlement was precipitated by the whitewashing of student political messages from LJHS's so-called "senior benches" by former principal Dana Shelburne.

According to the ACLU chapter, the settlement includes an updated and constitutionally-sound free speech policy for all students in the San Diego Unified School District.

=== 2014 football concussion and lawsuit ===
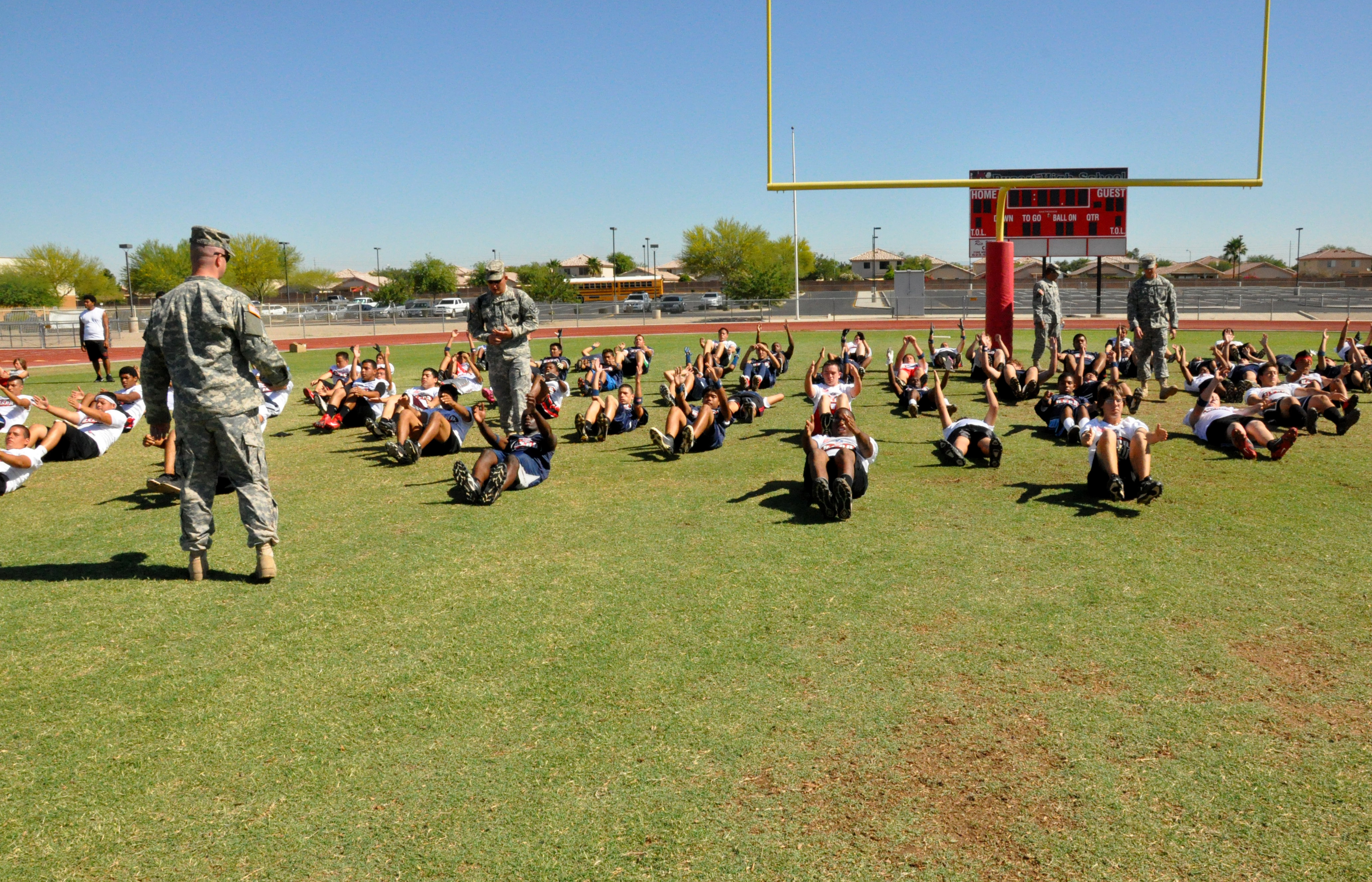
La Jolla High School athletes conduct Physical Readiness Training in a four-day program hosted by the National Guard and National Football League in 2012.

In October 2014, La Jolla High School student Trey Enloe suffered a concussion in a Junior Varsity football game against Point Loma High School. Assistant coach Steven Wachs was suspended for the rest of the season following the incident, however, he said he was unaware of the player's concussion during the game. Former NFL player and LJHS Football Head Coach Jason Carter denied any knowledge of the incident. Carter told the Voice of San Diego (VOSD) that he "was present at the junior varsity game on Oct. 16, but didn’t see [the student] get injured." However, video footage obtained by VOSD through a Public Records Act request show Carter watching as the injured student was assessed.

VOSD reporter Mario Koran wrote that "Principal Chuck Podhorsky wouldn’t confirm whether the incident took place. The district said my inquiry was the first it had heard of the details of the incident." An internal email obtained by the VOSD revealed that Vice Principal Anne McCarty had notified all other administrators, including Principal Podhorsky, of the incident via email.

According to his father, the student "now experiences a constant state of fogginess. He can’t read more than three lines at a time before a searing headache sets in ...[he] hasn’t formally withdrawn from school, his dad said, but his grades for the semester won’t count."

In October 2015, the Enloe family filed suit against the San Diego Unified School District.

=== 2015 campus vandalism ===
Between Friday, February 20, 2015, and Saturday, February 21, 2015, LJHS was subject to campus-wide vandalism in the form of graffiti. In addition to graffiti that was graphic and sexual in nature, the San Diego Union Tribune reported that it was being pursued as a hate crime, in part because the words "White America" and a swastika were a part of the graffiti. The graffiti was found in various areas of the campus, including on the Free Speech Bulletin Board.

News footage from San Diego CBS8 shows SDUSD employees removing student posters from the Free Speech Board indicated in the 2012 ACLU settlement in order to scrub explicit graffiti.

=== 2018 racial stereotyping ===
The school's newspaper, Hi-Tide, faced scrutiny in 2018 after running cartoons of various racial stereotypes. This was later described as "an error in judgment" by the school's principal and SDUSD. This led to calls for the principal's dismissal, which were ultimately denied.

=== 2020 Martin Teachworth sexual abuse lawsuit ===
On February 27, 2020, four female graduates of LJHS filed a lawsuit against SDUSD and former high school physics teacher Martin Teachworth. The plaintiffs alleged that Teachworth had groped them and sexually harassed them while they were minors enrolled in his classes, that LJHS and SDUSD knew about complaints filed against Teachworth, and that LJHS administrators and SDUSD officials had engaged in a cover-up as to Teachworth's conduct.

== Notable alumni ==
=== Business and politics ===
- Roger Guy English, businessman and Guinness World Record holder
- Trip Hawkins, video game pioneer and research within game theory, founder of EA
- Terra Lawson-Remer, San Diego county supervisor
- Doug Manchester, real estate developer, publisher of San Diego Union Tribune
- Evan Murphy, civil rights activist

=== Entertainment and media ===
- Michael Andrews, film and television composer, cover version of "Mad World"
- Sean Casey, filmmaker, actor
- Robbin Crosby, guitarist with heavy metal band, Ratt
- Warren DeMartini, lead guitarist with heavy metal band, Ratt
- Crystal Hefner, Playboy Playmate and third wife of Hugh Hefner
- John Michael Higgins, actor and comedian
- Jeffrey Jacquet, former child actor and attorney
- Samin Nosrat, celebrity chef and author
- Pierre de Reeder, bassist of band Rilo Kiley
- Cliff Robertson, Academy Award-winning actor
- Alan Russell, bestselling mystery and crime novelist
- Gore Verbinski, Academy Award-winner and director Pirates of the Caribbean movies
- Blake Sennett, actor and lead guitarist of band Rilo Kiley
- Raquel Welch, Golden Globe Award-winning actress
- Robin Wright, Golden Globe Award-winning actress

=== Science ===
- James H. Newman, astronaut

=== Sports ===
- Bill Andrews, surfer, documentary photographer, archivist
- Rolf Benirschke, professional football player, kicker for San Diego Chargers
- Eric Hedlin, Olympic swimmer for Canada
- Wally Henry, Olympic curling coach
- Terry Holladay, professional tennis player
- Gene Littler, professional golfer, 1961 U.S. Open champion
- Debbie McCormick, Olympic curler
- John Michels, NFL offensive tackle, Super Bowl Champion for Green Bay Packers
- Raúl Ramírez, professional tennis player
- Bruce Robinson, professional baseball player, catcher for Oakland A's & New York Yankees; singer/songwriter
- Dave Robinson, professional baseball player, outfielder for San Diego Padres
- Phil Rodgers, professional golfer, 1963 British Open runner-up
- Dave Schramm, offensive coordinator of University of Utah football team
- John Shuster, Olympic curler
- Bob Skinner, professional baseball player and manager, 2-time World Series champion
- Karin Smith, Olympic javelin thrower
- Craig Stadler, professional golfer, 1982 Masters champion
- Butch Van Artsdalen, legendary surfer
- Bradley Zimmer, professional baseball player, outfielder for Cleveland Indians
- Kyle Zimmer, professional baseball player, pitcher for Kansas City Royals
