= Bradley Zimmer =

American baseball player (born 1992)

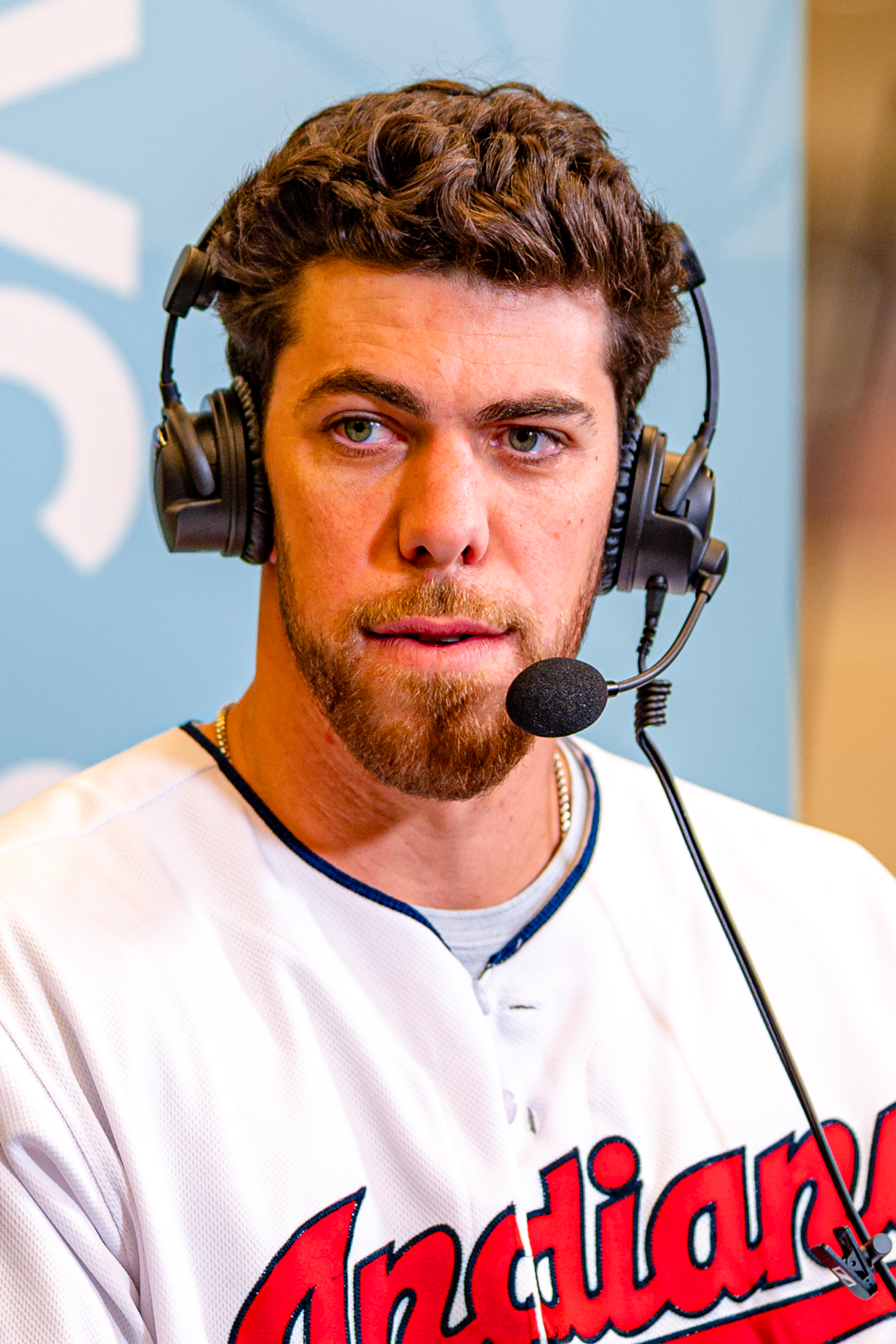
- Zimmer with the Cleveland Indians in 2020
- Center fielder
- Born: November 27, 1992 (age 33); San Diego, California, U.S.
- Batted: Left Threw: Right

MLB debut
- May 16, 2017, for the Cleveland Indians

Last MLB appearance
- October 5, 2022, for the Toronto Blue Jays

MLB statistics
- Batting average: .213
- Home runs: 21
- Runs batted in: 91
- Stats at Baseball Reference

Teams
- Cleveland Indians (2017–2021); Toronto Blue Jays (2022); Philadelphia Phillies (2022); Toronto Blue Jays (2022)

Bradley Clarke Zimmer (born November 27, 1992) is an American former professional baseball center fielder. He attended the University of San Francisco, and played college baseball for the San Francisco Dons baseball team. He was drafted by the Cleveland Indians in the first round of the 2014 MLB draft and made his Major League Baseball (MLB) debut with them in 2017. He also played in Major League Baseball (MLB) for the Philadelphia Phillies and Toronto Blue Jays.

== Amateur career ==
Zimmer attended La Jolla High School in San Diego, California, where he played for the school's baseball team. The Chicago Cubs selected Zimmer in the 23rd round, with the 699th overall selection, of the 2011 Major League Baseball (MLB) Draft, but Zimmer did not sign with the Cubs.

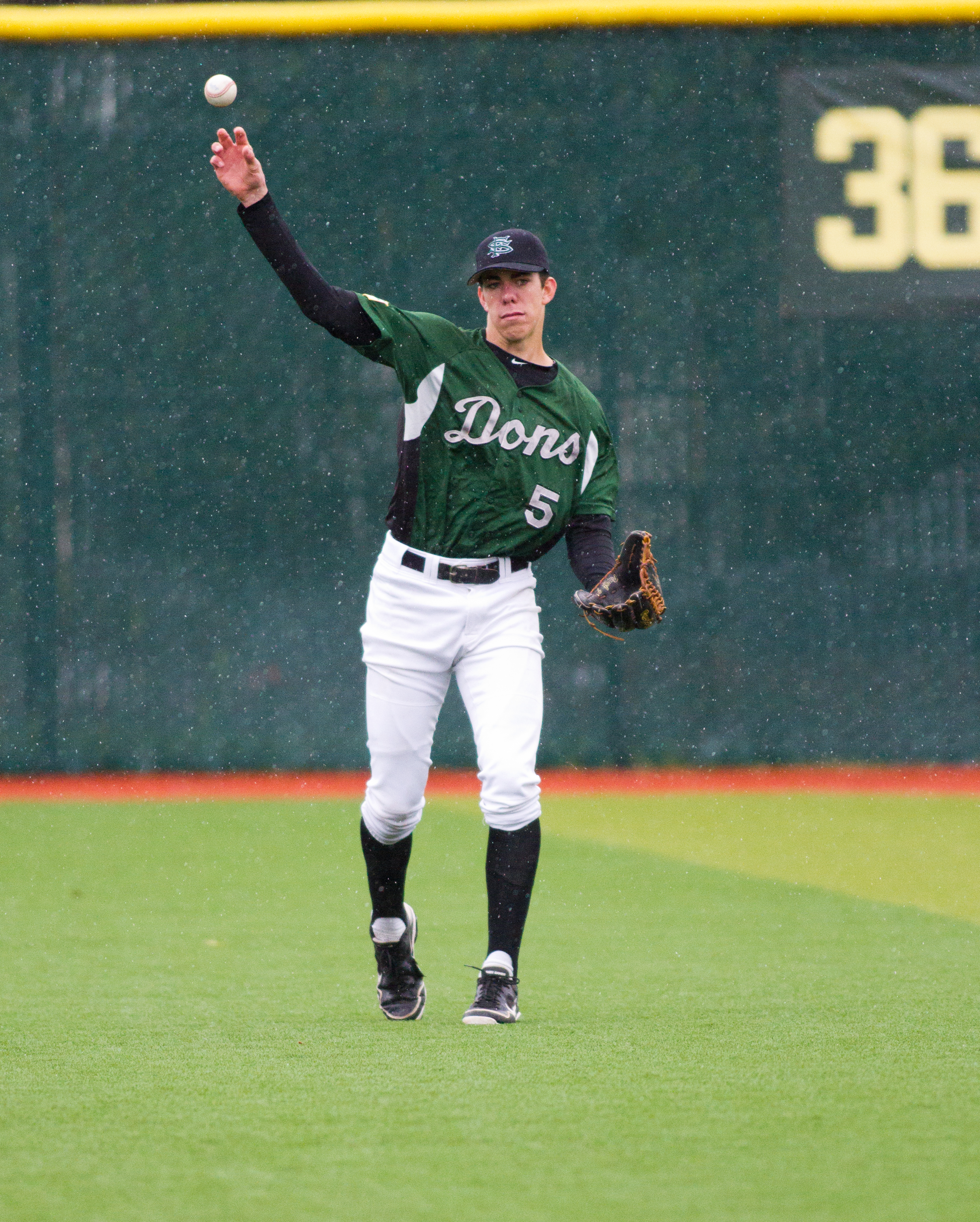
Zimmer with the San Francisco Dons

Zimmer enrolled at the University of San Francisco (USF) to play college baseball for the San Francisco Dons baseball team. In 2013, he played collegiate summer baseball with the Cotuit Kettleers of the Cape Cod Baseball League, where he was named playoff MVP of Cotuit's league championship club. In 2014, his junior year, he was named a preseason All-American and to the Golden Spikes Award's midseason watch list. He was considered to be among the best available prospects in the 2014 MLB draft. He finished his junior year at USF with a .368 batting average, seven home runs, 31 runs batted in (RBIs), and 21 stolen bases.

== Professional career ==
=== Cleveland Indians (2014–2021) ===
The Cleveland Indians selected Zimmer in the first round, 21st overall, of the 2014 Major League Baseball draft. He signed for a $1.9 million bonus on June 17, 2014. Zimmer then joined the Mahoning Valley Scrappers of the Low-A New York–Penn League. He finished the season with the Lake County Captains of the Single-A Midwest League. In 2015, the Indians assigned Zimmer to the Lynchburg Hillcats of the High-A Carolina League, where he batted .305 with ten home runs and 32 stolen bases in 37 attempts in 77 games. Zimmer was selected to represent the Indians at the 2015 All-Star Futures Game. Following the Futures Game, the Indians promoted Zimmer to the Akron RubberDucks of the Double-A Eastern League. Zimmer batted .219 with Akron. The Indians assigned Zimmer to the Scottsdale Scorpions of the Arizona Fall League (AFL), but he was diagnosed with a hairline fracture in his right foot and considered unlikely to play in the AFL.

Zimmer began the 2016 season with Akron, and was promoted to the Columbus Clippers of the Triple-A International League on July 25. Zimmer ended 2016 with a .250 batting average, 15 home runs and 62 RBIs, along with 38 stolen bases. After the season, the Indians assigned Zimmer to the Mesa Solar Sox of the Arizona Fall League. He returned to Columbus to start the 2017 season.

The Indians promoted Zimmer to the major leagues on May 16, 2017. He made his MLB debut that day. In his second MLB game, on May 17, Zimmer recorded his first MLB hit and home run. On July 25, Zimmer hit his first grand slam against the Los Angeles Angels of Anaheim, where the Indians won the game 11–7. Zimmer batted .241 with eight home runs and 39 RBIs in 299 at bats for Cleveland.

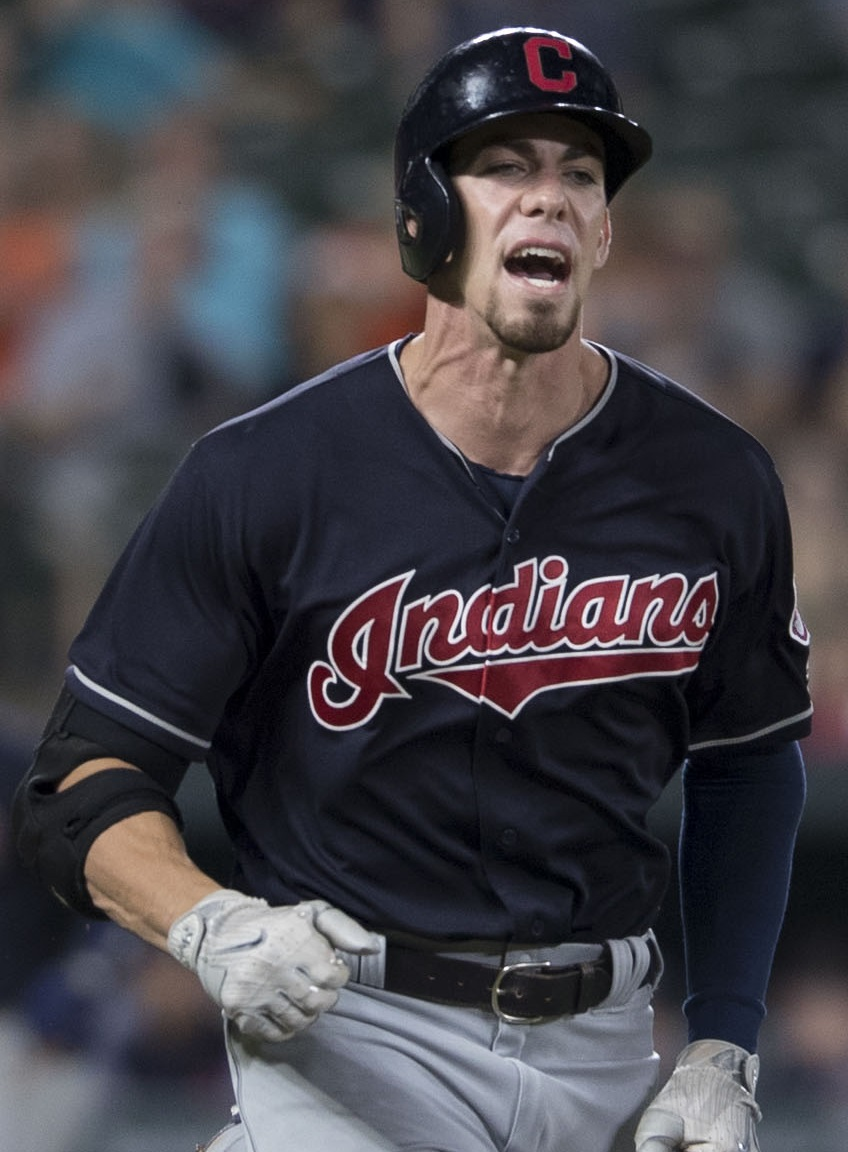
Zimmer with the Indians in 2017

Zimmer began 2018 as Cleveland's starting center fielder. However, after batting .226 with a 42% strikeout rate in early June, he was optioned to Triple-A Columbus. After playing in eight games for Columbus, Zimmer injured his right shoulder. He had an anti-inflammatory shot and was shut down for four-to-six weeks in late June. On July 21, 2018, Zimmer underwent right shoulder surgery to repair a torn labrum, and was out for the rest of the year. Recovery time required 8–12 months. In 2019, Zimmer appeared in only 13 at bats.

Overall with the 2020 Cleveland Indians, Zimmer batted .162 with one home run and 3 RBIs in 20 games. He started the 2021 season with Columbus, and was promoted to the major leagues on May 27. In 2021, batted .227 with eight home runs in 299 at bats. On September 27, 2021, Zimmer hit a solo home run off his older brother Kyle Zimmer in an 8-3 win over Kansas City. There have only been three previous occasions in MLB history since 1900 where a brother homered off another brother, according to the Elias Sports Bureau.

=== Toronto Blue Jays (2022) ===
Cleveland traded Zimmer to the Toronto Blue Jays for Anthony Castro on April 7, 2022. He was activated on April 10. Zimmer batted .105 in 87 plate appearances across 77 games. On August 15, Zimmer was designated for assignment.

=== Philadelphia Phillies (2022) ===
On August 18, 2022, the Philadelphia Phillies claimed Zimmer off waivers to fill in for Brandon Marsh, who went on the injured list. He posted a .250 average in nine games before being designated for assignment following Marsh's activation from the injured list on August 27.

=== Second stint with Blue Jays (2022) ===
On August 29, 2022, the Blue Jays reclaimed Zimmer off waivers. Zimmer ended the season with a .124 average, 13 hits, two home runs and five RBI. He did not make the Blue Jays postseason roster. On November 15, Zimmer was designated for assignment. He was non-tendered and became a free agent on November 18.

=== Los Angeles Dodgers (2023) ===
On December 17, 2022, the Los Angeles Dodgers signed Zimmer to a minor-league contract for the 2023 season. He began the season with the Triple-A Oklahoma City Dodgers, where he played in 31 games, hitting .219/.323/.343 with 3 home runs, 14 RBI, and 8 stolen bases. On May 18, 2023, Zimmer was released by the Dodgers organization.

=== Boston Red Sox (2023) ===
On May 19, 2023, Zimmer signed a minor-league contract with the Boston Red Sox organization. In 47 games for the Triple–A Worcester Red Sox, he batted .199/.321/.340 with 5 home runs, 17 RBI, and 11 stolen bases. Zimmer elected free agency following the season on November 6.

=== Colorado Rockies ===
On February 6, 2024, Zimmer signed a minor league contract with the Colorado Rockies. He was released on March 24 when he failed to make the major league roster.

== Personal life ==
Zimmer's father, Eric, played college baseball at the University of California, San Diego. He is an anesthesiologist. His mother, Cathy, ran track at San Diego State University, and works as a counselor at La Jolla High. His older brother, Kyle, is also a baseball player. His wife, Madeline is a physical therapist.
