= Josh Staumont =

American baseball player (born 1993)

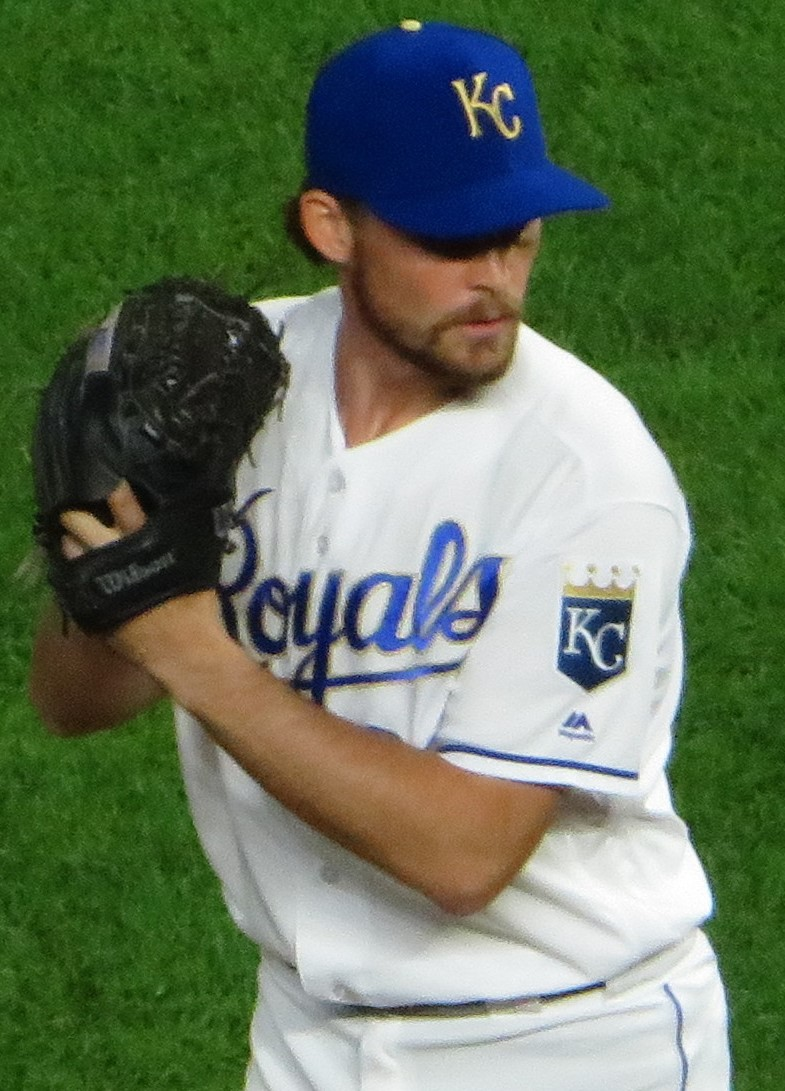
- Staumont with the Kansas City Royals in 2019

Free agent
- Pitcher
- Born: December 21, 1993 (age 32); La Habra, California, U.S.
- Bats: Right Throws: Right

MLB debut
- July 25, 2019, for the Kansas City Royals

MLB statistics (through 2024 season)
- Win–loss record: 10–7
- Earned run average: 3.59
- Strikeouts: 206
- Stats at Baseball Reference

Teams
- Kansas City Royals (2019–2023); Minnesota Twins (2024)

Joshua Tyler Staumont (born December 21, 1993) is an American professional baseball pitcher who is a free agent. He has previously played in Major League Baseball (MLB) for the Kansas City Royals and Minnesota Twins. He made his MLB debut in 2019.

== Amateur career ==
Staumont attended La Habra High School in La Habra, California, and played college baseball at Biola University and Azusa Pacific University. In 2014, he played collegiate summer baseball in the Cape Cod Baseball League, winning a league title with the Yarmouth-Dennis Red Sox. He was drafted by the Kansas City Royals in the second round of the 2015 Major League Baseball draft and became one of the highest selected players from Azusa Pacific.

== Professional career ==
=== Kansas City Royals ===
==== Minor leagues ====
Staumont made his professional debut in 2015 with the Arizona League Royals and was later promoted to the Idaho Falls Chukars; in 18 combined games between both teams, he went 3–1 with a 2.48 ERA. In 2016, Staumont pitched for both the Wilmington Blue Rocks and Northwest Arkansas Naturals, pitching to a combined 4–11 record and 4.23 ERA in 29 total games (26 total starts) between both teams. After the season, he played in the Arizona Fall League.

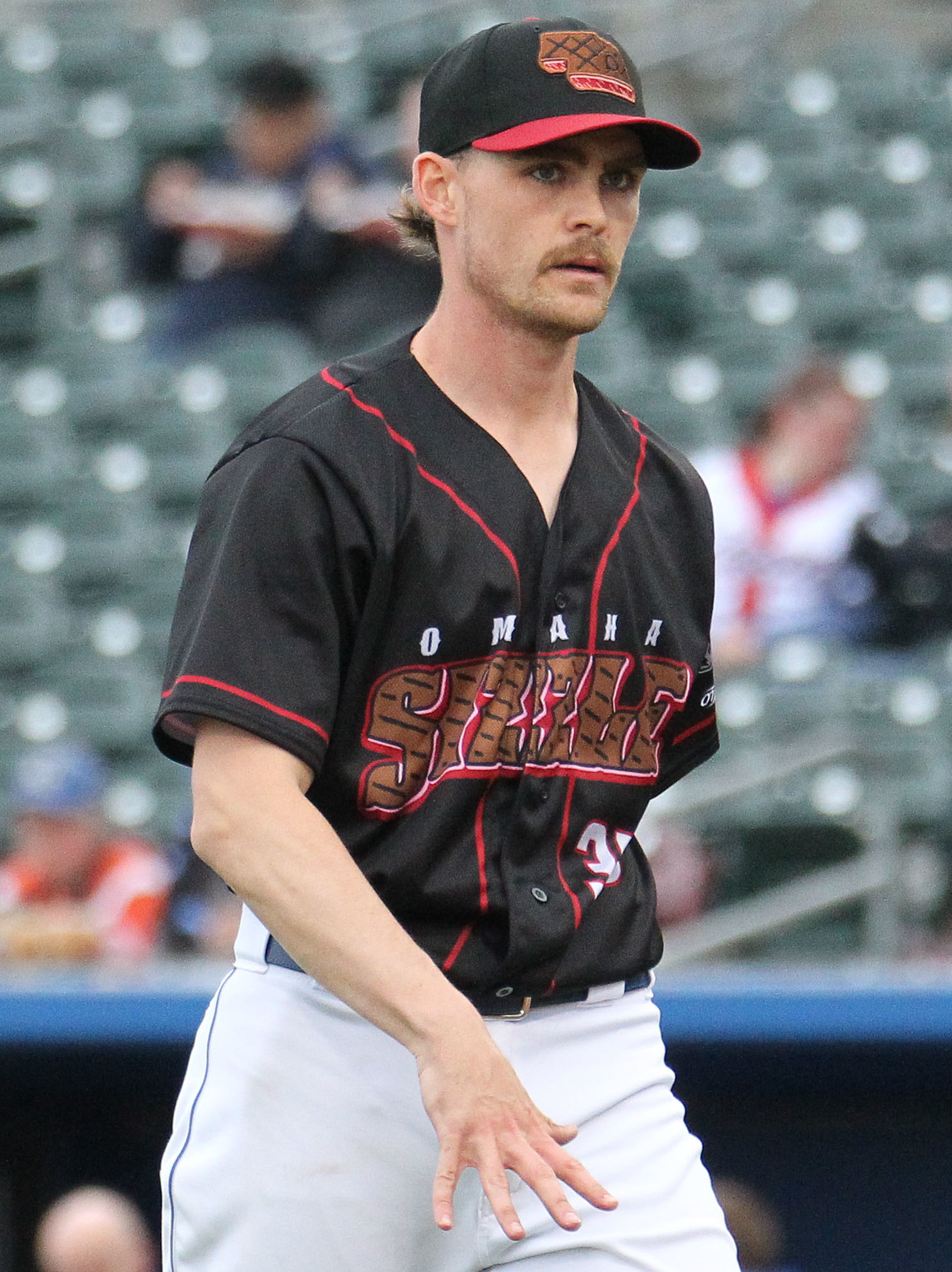
Staumont with the Omaha Storm Chasers in 2019

Staumont spent 2017 with both Northwest Arkansas and the Omaha Storm Chasers where he went 6–12 with a 5.56 ERA with 138 strikeouts in 124.2 total innings pitched between the two clubs. In 2018, he pitched for Omaha, going 2–5 with a 3.51 ERA in 74.1 innings pitched, mainly in relief. The Royals added Staumont to their 40-man roster after the 2018 season. He returned to Omaha to begin 2019.

==== Major leagues ====
On July 20, 2019, the Royals promoted Staumont to the major leagues. He made his major league debut on July 25, pitching two scoreless innings in relief. In 16 games during his rookie campaign, Staumont pitched to a 3.72 ERA with 15 strikeouts. In 2020, he was 2–1 with a 2.45 ERA. Balls hit off of him had the highest average exit velocity of those hit off of any major league pitcher, at 94.4 mph.

In 2021, Staumont was 4–3 with a 2.88 ERA and 72 strikeouts and 5 saves in 65 2/3 innings. Staumont made 42 appearances for Kansas City in 2022, but struggled to a 3–3 record and 6.45 ERA with 43 strikeouts and 3 saves in 37 2/3 innings pitched.

Staumont was optioned to Triple-A Omaha to begin the 2023 season. After being recalled in mid–April, Staumont logged a 5.40 ERA in 21 appearances before he was placed on the injured list with a neck strain on June 7. After suffering a setback in his recovery, Staumont was transferred to the 60-day injured list on July 14. Shortly thereafter, it was announced that Staumont would undergo season-ending thoracic outlet syndrome surgery. On November 14, Staumont was designated for assignment after multiple prospects were added to the roster. He was non-tendered and became a free agent on November 17.

=== Minnesota Twins ===
On December 27, 2023, Staumont signed a one-year contract with the Minnesota Twins. In 25 appearances for Minnesota in 2024, he compiled a 3.70 ERA with 18 strikeouts across 24 1/3 innings of work. Staumont was designated for assignment following the promotion of Randy Dobnak on July 30, 2024. He was released by the Twins organization on August 2.

=== Chicago Cubs ===
On August 9, 2024, Staumont signed a minor league contract with the Chicago Cubs organization. In two appearances for the Triple–A Iowa Cubs, he allowed two runs on one hit and five walks with one strikeout over one inning pitched. Staumont was released by the Cubs organization on August 22.

=== Cincinnati Reds ===
On February 11, 2025, Staumont signed a minor league contract with the Cincinnati Reds. On March 28, Staumont was placed on the full-season injured list, ending his season without making an appearance. Staumont elected free agency following the season on November 6.

On December 30, 2025, Staumont re-signed with the Reds organization on a minor league contract. He made eight total appearances split between the rookie-level Arizona Complex League Reds and High-A Dayton Dragons, recording a cumulative 1.29 ERA with 11 strikeouts across seven innings pitched. Staumont was released by the Reds on June 2, 2026.

== Personal life ==
Staumont and his wife, Angelina, married in January 2019.
