= Kyle Zimmer =

American baseball player (born 1991)

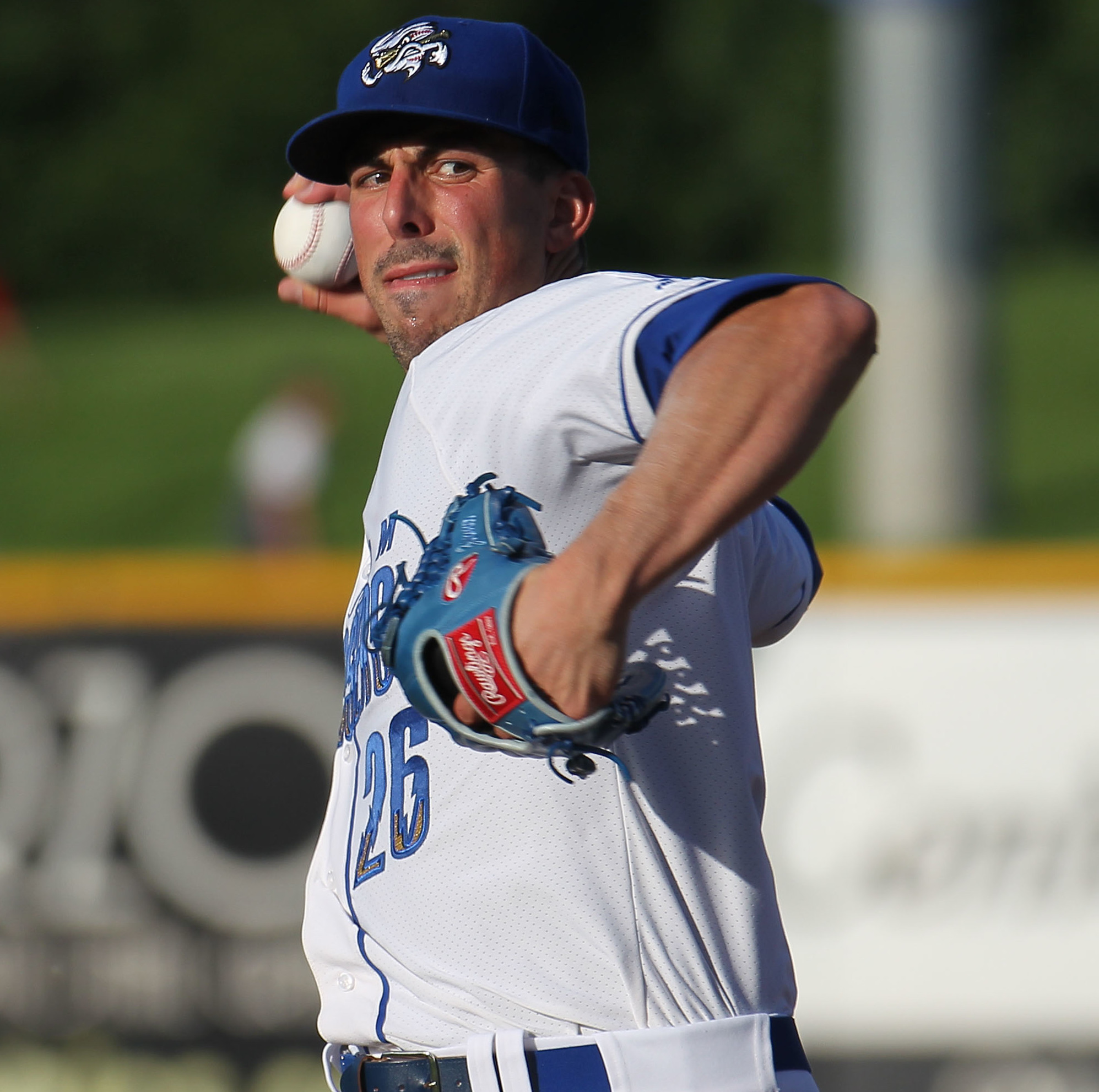
- Zimmer playing for the Omaha Storm Chasers in 2019
- Pitcher
- Born: September 13, 1991 (age 34); San Francisco, California, U.S.
- Batted: Right Threw: Right

MLB debut
- March 31, 2019, for the Kansas City Royals

Last MLB appearance
- October 2, 2021, for the Kansas City Royals

MLB statistics
- Win–loss record: 5–2
- Earned run average: 5.29
- Strikeouts: 90
- Stats at Baseball Reference

Teams
- Kansas City Royals (2019–2021)

Kyle Joseph Zimmer (born September 13, 1991) is an American former professional baseball pitcher. He played in Major League Baseball (MLB) for the Kansas City Royals from 2019 to 2021. The Royals selected Zimmer in the first round of the 2012 MLB draft.

== Amateur career ==
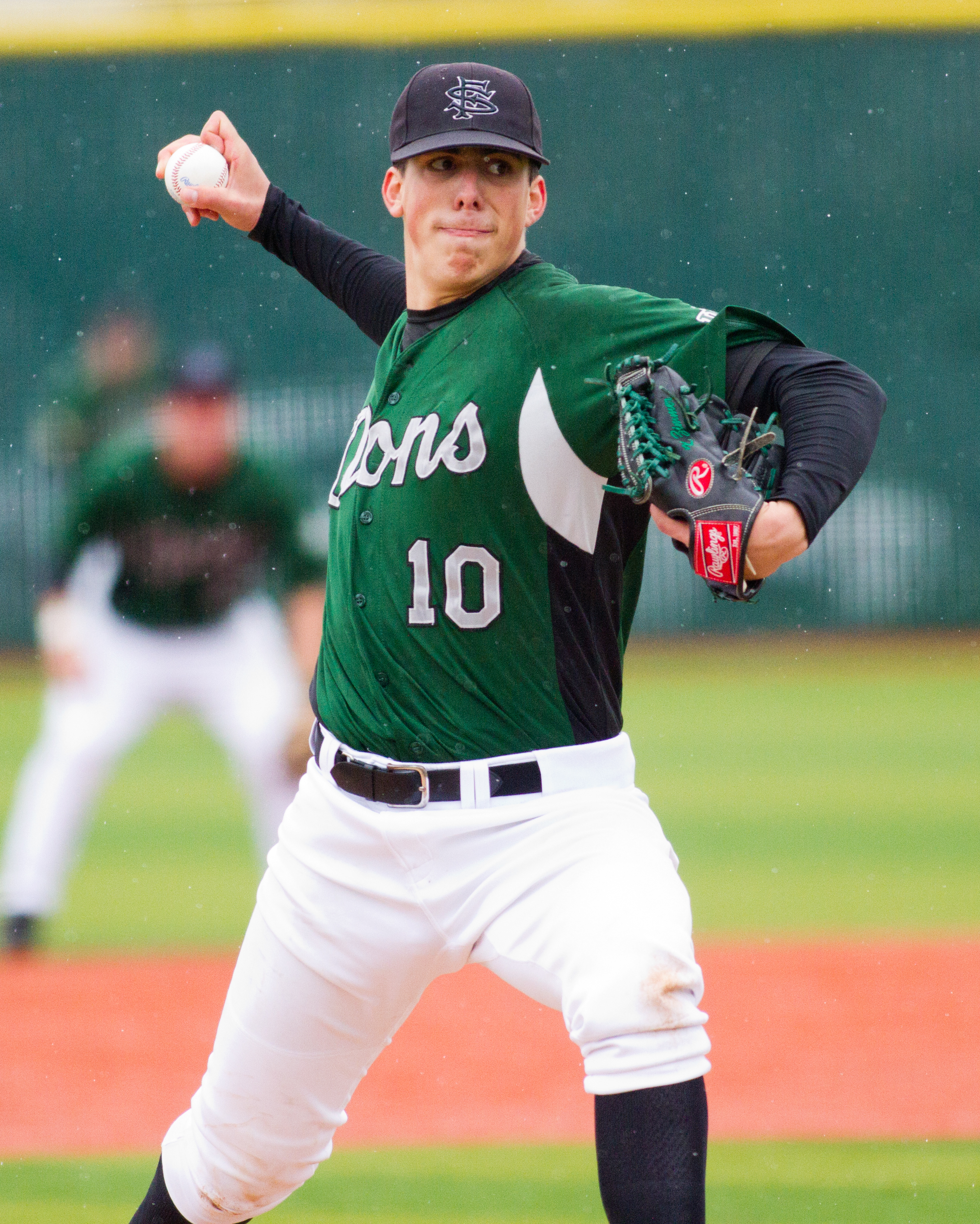
Zimmer pitching for the University of San Francisco in 2012

Zimmer was born in San Francisco, California and grew up in San Diego and attended La Jolla High School. He played first base, third base, and pitched 22.1 innings during his senior year and was named team MVP after batting .410 with a .492 on-base percentage and a .701 slugging percentage with four home runs and 23 RBI. On the mound, he had a record of 3–3 with a 4.39 ERA. Zimmer was also named to the San Diego All-Academic team with a 4.20 GPA and graduated as a member of the Cum Laude Society.

Zimmer played college baseball at University of San Francisco and committed with the intention of playing third base for the Dons. The Dons moved him to pitcher due to having an all-conference player, Stephen Yarrow, starting at third base. As a freshman in 2010, Zimmer pitched 5.1 innings in five appearances. After his freshman year, he played collegiate summer baseball for the Alexandria Aces of the Cal Ripken Collegiate Baseball League. In 2011, he was named first team All-West Coast Conference (WCC) after posting a 6–4 record with 89 strikeouts. Following the season, he played for the Cotuit Kettleers of the Cape Cod Baseball League and went 2–5 with a 3.38 ERA in 48 innings pitched. In 2012, Zimmer went 5–3 with a 2.85 ERA and a WCC-leading 104 strikeouts and was again named first team all-conference. Zimmer was inducted into USF's athletic hall of fame in 2020.

== Professional career ==
=== Minor leagues ===
The Kansas City Royals selected Zimmer with the fifth overall pick of the 2012 MLB draft, and he signed with the Royals three days after being drafted. He was assigned to the AZL Royals, and after posting a 0.90 ERA in ten innings, was promoted to the Kane County Cougars, where he pitched to a 2–3 record and 2.43 ERA in six games started. He pitched for the Wilmington Blue Rocks of the Class A-Advanced Carolina League and the Northwest Arkansas Naturals of the Class AA Texas League in 2013, posting a combined 6–9 record with a 4.32 ERA in 22 games between both teams. His season ended prematurely due to tendinitis in his biceps. In 2014, he pitched for the Idaho Falls Chukars, going 0–0 with a 1.93 ERA in 4.2 innings. Zimmer had shoulder surgery in October 2014. Zimmer began 2015 with the Lexington Legends and was later promoted to the Northwest Arkansas Naturals, pitching to a combined 3–5 record, 2.39 ERA, and a 1.14 WHIP in 64 innings.

The Royals added Zimmer to their 40-man roster after the 2015 season. In 2016, he pitched only three games due to shoulder fatigue and he underwent surgery, thus ending his 2016 season. Zimmer returned to action in 2017 and pitched for both Northwest Arkansas and the Omaha Storm Chasers, posting a combined 5.40 ERA with 40 strikeouts in 36.2 innings pitched between both teams.

Prior to the start of the 2018 season, Zimmer was designated for assignment on March 28. He was released on April 4, 2018, then re-signed to a minor league contract two days later. He spent the 2018 rehabilitating. He elected free agency on November 3, 2018.

On January 4, 2019, Zimmer re-signed with Kansas City on a major league contract.

=== Kansas City Royals ===
Zimmer made the Royals' 2019 Opening Day roster. He made his major league debut on March 31, 2019, versus the Chicago White Sox, recording one scoreless inning, with two strikeouts. He was optioned to Omaha on April 8. Zimmer bounced between the Royals and AAA Omaha for most of the year, appearing in 15 games with a 10.80 earned run average at the major league level.

With the 2020 Kansas City Royals, Zimmer appeared in 16 games, compiling a 1–0 record with a 1.57 ERA and 26 strikeouts in 23 innings pitched. In 2021, he went 4–1 with a 4.83 ERA and 46 strikeouts in 54 innings. Zimmer was designated for assignment on November 19 and was released by the Royals on November 24.

=== Cincinnati Reds ===
On March 19, 2022, Zimmer signed a minor league contract with the Cincinnati Reds. He was released on August 9, 2022.

== Personal ==
Zimmer's younger brother, Bradley, is also a professional baseball player. Zimmer and his wife, Haley, were married in 2021.
