= Domingo Tapia =

Dominican baseball player (born 1991)

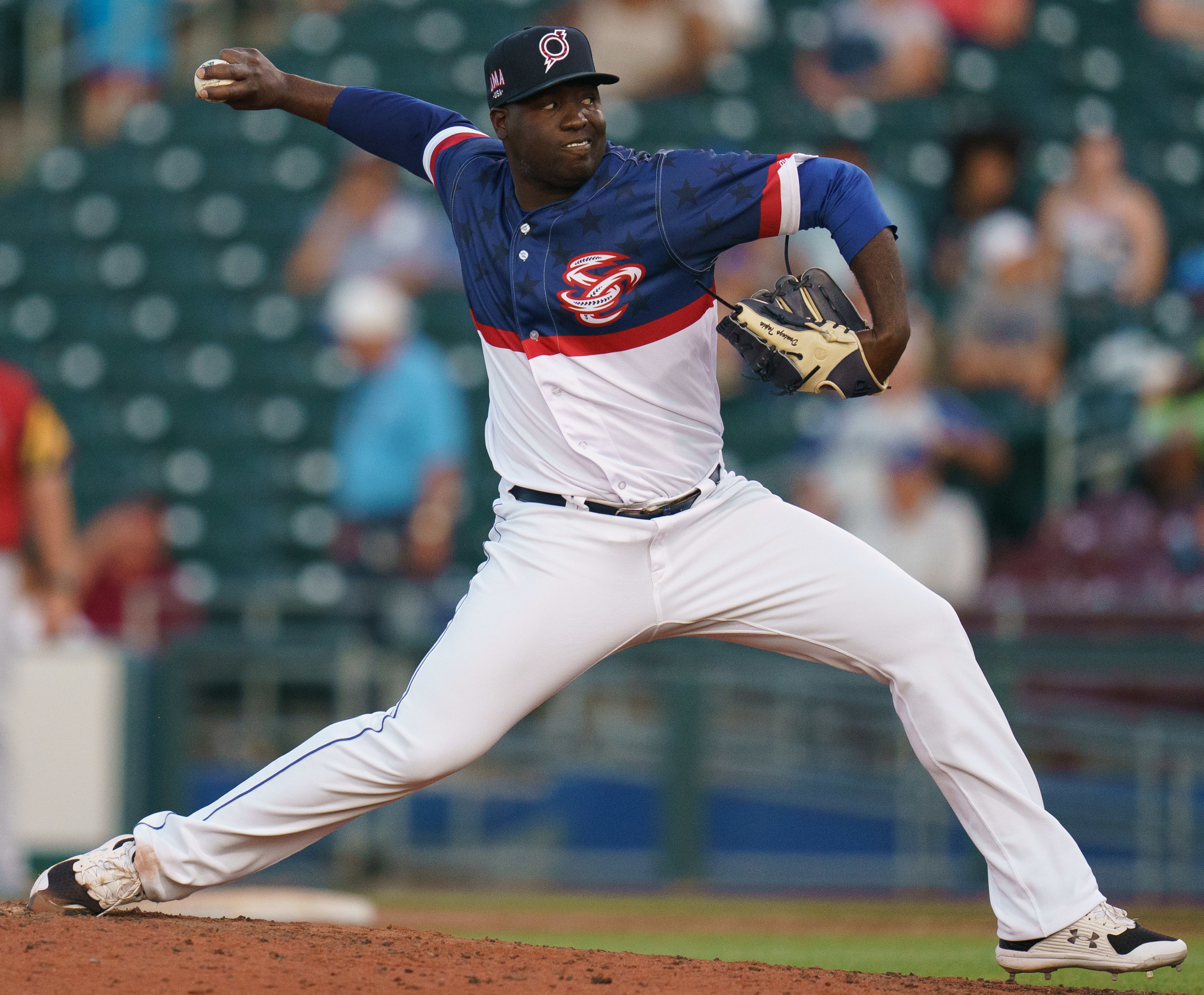
- Tapia with the Omaha Storm Chasers in 2021

Free agent
- Pitcher
- Born: August 4, 1991 (age 35); Santo Domingo, Dominican Republic
- Bats: Right Throws: Right

MLB debut
- September 11, 2020, for the Boston Red Sox

MLB statistics (through 2023 season)
- Win–loss record: 4–2
- Earned run average: 4.21
- Strikeouts: 56
- Stats at Baseball Reference

Teams
- Boston Red Sox (2020); Seattle Mariners (2021); Kansas City Royals (2021); Oakland Athletics (2022); San Diego Padres (2023)

Domingo Rafael Tapia (born August 4, 1991) is a Dominican professional baseball pitcher who is a free agent. Listed at 6 feet 3 inches (1.91 m) and 263 pounds (119 kg), he throws and bats right-handed. He has previously played in Major League Baseball (MLB) for the Boston Red Sox, Seattle Mariners, Kansas City Royals, Oakland Athletics, and San Diego Padres.

== Career ==
=== New York Mets ===
On May 28, 2010, Tapia signed with the New York Mets organization as an international free agent. Tapia began his professional baseball career in 2010, pitching in the Dominican Summer League and the Gulf Coast League. He split the 2011 season between the rookie ball Kingsport Mets and the Low-A Brooklyn Cyclones, recording a 6–5 record and 3.38 ERA in 12 games. In 2012, Tapia spent the year in Single-A with the Savannah Sand Gnats, posting a 6–5 record and 3.98 ERA in 20 appearances. In 2013, he spent the season with the High-A St. Lucie Mets, pitching to a 3–9 record and 4.62 ERA in 101.1 innings of work. He played in 21 games for St. Lucie the following year, posting a 6–8 record and 3.96 ERA.

Tapia began the 2015 season with the Double-A Binghamton Mets, but after giving up five hits, eight walks, two HBP, and nine runs in 1.2 innings, he underwent Tommy John surgery in May 2015. He appeared in 19 games with St. Lucie in 2016, also making 1 appearances for Binghamton, registering a 0–2 record and 3.56 ERA with 25 strikeouts. Tapia elected free agency following the season on November 7, 2016.

=== Cincinnati Reds ===
On November 28, 2016, Tapia signed a minor league contract with the Cincinnati Reds organization. In 2017, he split the season between the Triple-A Louisville Bats and the Double-A Pensacola Blue Wahoos, posting a 4–7 record and 4.08 ERA with 85 strikeouts between the two clubs. He elected free agency following the season on November 6, 2017.

After re–signing with the Reds on January 19, 2018, Tapia again split the ensuing season between Louisville and Pensacola, recording a 4–5 record and 3.60 ERA in 48 appearances. On November 2, he elected free agency.

=== Boston Red Sox ===
On November 16, 2018, Tapia signed a minor league deal with the Boston Red Sox organization. In 2019, he played for the Pawtucket Red Sox, Boston's Triple-A affiliate, posting a 5–4 win–loss record in 44 games (1 start) with two saves, a 5.18 earned run average (ERA), and 52 strikeouts in 66 innings pitched. Through 2019, including with Pawtucket, Tapia appeared in 242 games in 10 seasons of Minor League Baseball, accruing a 38–50 record with 4.14 ERA and four saves. He also played four seasons in the Dominican Winter League, with Gigantes del Cibao.

During the delayed-start 2020 major league season, Tapia was added to Boston's player pool at the end of June. On September 11, he was added to Boston's major league active roster. He made his MLB debut that day, against the Tampa Bay Rays; the first batter he faced, Nate Lowe, hit a home run. Tapia was placed on the injured list before Boston's final series of the season, due to a right biceps contusion. Overall with the 2020 Red Sox, Tapia appeared in five games, all in relief, recording a 2.08 ERA and four strikeouts in 4 1/3 innings pitched.

=== Seattle Mariners ===
On October 23, 2020, Tapia was claimed off waivers by the Seattle Mariners. Tapia threw two scoreless innings with Seattle before being designated for assignment on May 17, 2021.

=== Kansas City Royals ===
On May 22, 2021, Tapia was traded to the Kansas City Royals in exchange for cash considerations. Tapia made 32 appearances for Kansas City in 2021, posting a 4–1 record and 2.84 ERA with 25 strikeouts in 31 2/3 innings pitched.

He was assigned to the Triple-A Omaha Storm Chasers to begin the 2022 season. He logged a 3.60 ERA in 5 games for Omaha before he was designated for assignment by the Royals on April 24, 2022, following the acquisition of Matt Peacock.

=== Oakland Athletics ===
On April 30, 2022, Tapia was claimed off waivers by the Oakland Athletics. The Athletics recalled Tapia to their major league roster on May 29. In 11 appearances for the Athletics, he struggled to an 8.47 ERA with 12 strikeouts in 17.0 innings pitched. On September 11, Tapia was designated for assignment by Oakland. He cleared waivers and was sent outright to the Triple–A Las Vegas Aviators on September 14. He elected free agency following the season on November 10.

=== San Diego Padres ===
On January 15, 2023, Tapia signed a minor league deal with the San Diego Padres. He had his contract selected on March 30. Tapia spent time up and down between the Padres and the Triple–A El Paso Chihuahuas; in 15 games for the Padres, he recorded a 3.57 ERA with 14 strikeouts across 17 2/3 innings of work. On July 22, Tapia was designated for assignment following the promotion of Jackson Wolf. He cleared waivers and was sent outright to Triple–A El Paso on July 28. Tapia elected free agency on October 15.

=== Diablos Rojos del México ===
On April 15, 2025, Tapia signed with the Diablos Rojos del México of the Mexican League. In 21 appearances for the team, he logged a 2–0 record and 8.05 ERA with 17 strikeouts over 19 innings of work. On July 6, Tapia was released by the Diablos.
