= Jake Brentz =

American baseball player (born 1994)

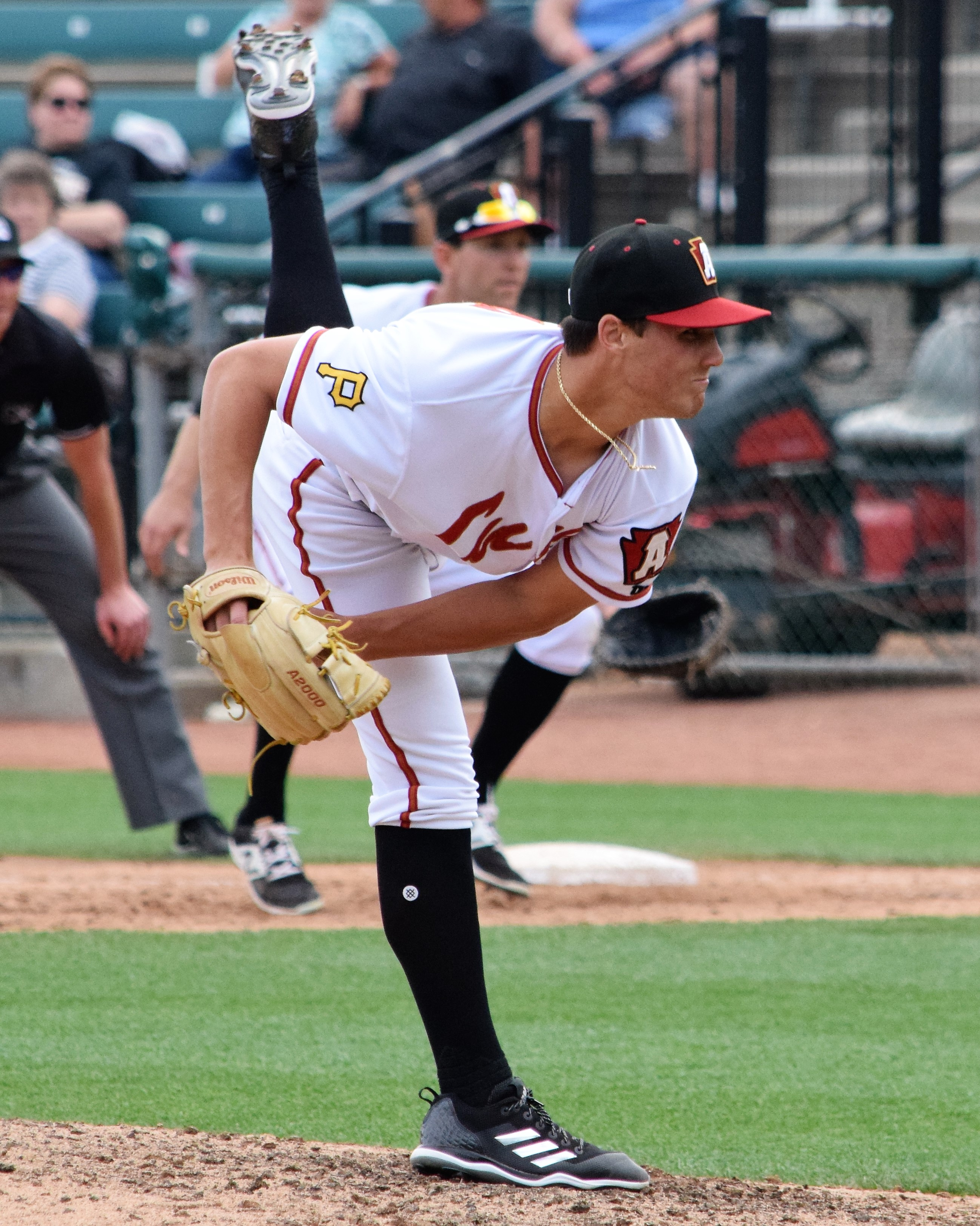
- Brentz with the Altoona Curve in 2018

Kansas City Monarchs – No. 27
- Pitcher
- Born: September 14, 1994 (age 31); Ballwin, Missouri, U.S.
- Bats: Left Throws: Left

MLB debut
- April 3, 2021, for the Kansas City Royals

MLB statistics (through 2022 season)
- Win–loss record: 5–5
- Earned run average: 5.19
- Strikeouts: 85
- Stats at Baseball Reference

Teams
- Kansas City Royals (2021–2022)

Jacob Steven Brentz (born September 14, 1994) is an American professional baseball pitcher for the Kansas City Monarchs of the American Association of Professional Baseball. He was drafted in the 11th round of the 2013 MLB draft by the Toronto Blue Jays and made his Major League Baseball (MLB) debut in 2021 for the Kansas City Royals.

== Career ==
=== Toronto Blue Jays ===
Brentz attended Parkway South High School in Manchester, Missouri. The Toronto Blue Jays drafted him in the 11th round of the 2013 Major League Baseball draft. On July 12, 2013, Brentz signed with the Blue Jays. Brentz made his professional season with the rookie-level Gulf Coast League Blue Jays.

=== Seattle Mariners ===
On July 31, 2015, the Blue Jays traded Brentz, Rob Rasmussen, and Nick Wells to the Seattle Mariners in exchange for Mark Lowe. He finished the season with the Low-A Everett AquaSox. In 2016, Brentz split the season between Everett and the Single-A Clinton LumberKings, also appearing in two games for the Triple-A Tacoma Rainiers. In 20 appearances (7 starts) for the three affiliates, he posted a cumulative 4-2 record and 5.32 ERA with 50 strikeouts across 4 2/3 innings pitched.

=== Pittsburgh Pirates ===
On September 1, 2016, the Mariners traded Brentz and Pedro Vasquez to the Pittsburgh Pirates in exchange for Arquimedes Caminero. Brentz split the 2017 and 2018 season between the High-A Bradenton Marauders and Double-A Altoona Curve. Brentz started the 2019 season with Altoona before being promoted to the Triple-A Indianapolis Indians. On August 16, 2019, the Pirates released Brentz.

=== Kansas City Royals ===
On August 20, 2019, Brentz signed a minor league contract with the Kansas City Royals organization. He finished the 2019 season with the Double-A Northwest Arkansas Naturals, hurling 5 1/3 innings of 3.38 ERA ball with 8.4 K/9. On July 19, 2020, Brentz was added to the Royals 60-man player pool, a replacement for the minor leagues due to the cancellation of the Minor League Baseball season because of the COVID-19 pandemic. Brentz was invited to spring training for the Royals in 2021.

On April 1, 2021, Brentz had his contract selected to the 40-man roster, and it was announced that he had made the Royals Opening Day roster. On April 3, Brentz made his MLB debut in relief against the Texas Rangers, pitching a scoreless 2/3 inning and notching his first major league strikeout, striking out Rangers first baseman Nathaniel Lowe.

Brentz began the 2022 season with Kansas City, posting a 0–3 record and 23.63 ERA with nine strikeouts in eight appearances. On June 12, 2022, Brentz was placed on the 60-day injured list with a left flexor strain. He underwent Tommy John surgery on July 21, ending his season. On November 15, Brentz was designated for assignment by the Royals. On November 18, it was announced that the Royals would not tender Brentz a contract for the 2023 season, making him a free agent.

On March 16, 2023, Brentz signed a two-year contract with the Royals. On August 14, he began a rehab assignment with the rookie–level Arizona Complex League Royals. On August 22, his assignment was moved to Double–A, however he was removed three days later for an unspecified reason. The same day, Brentz was diagnosed with a left lat strain that would end his season prematurely.

Brentz began the 2024 season in the minor leagues, and struggled to a 12.71 ERA in 20 appearances split between Northwest Arkansas and the Triple–A Omaha Storm Chasers. He was designated for assignment by the Royals on June 24, 2024. Brentz cleared waivers and was sent outright to Omaha on June 28. He elected free agency on October 11.

=== Kansas City Monarchs ===
On December 7, 2024, Brentz signed a minor league contract with the Tampa Bay Rays. He was released prior to the start of the season on March 13, 2025.

On April 15, 2025, Brentz signed with the Kansas City Monarchs of the American Association of Professional Baseball. In 13 appearances for the Monarchs, Brentz logged a 1-1 record and 4.38 ERA with 17 strikeouts and one save across 12 1/3 innings pitched.

=== Chicago Cubs ===
On June 15, 2025, Brentz's contract was purchased by the Chicago Cubs organization. He made nine appearances split between the rookie-level Arizona Complex League Cubs and Double-A Knoxville Smokies, struggling to a combined 0-1 record and 14.63 ERA with eight strikeouts across eight innings of work. Brentz was released by the Cubs organization on July 28.

=== Kansas City Monarchs (second stint) ===
On August 16, 2025, Brentz signed with the Kansas City Monarchs of the American Association of Professional Baseball. In total between his two stints with the Monarchs he appeared in 18 games 18 innings of relief going 1-2 with a 5.00 ERA with 21 strikeouts and one save.
