= Carlos Hernández (pitcher, born 1997) =

Venezuelan baseball player (born 1997)

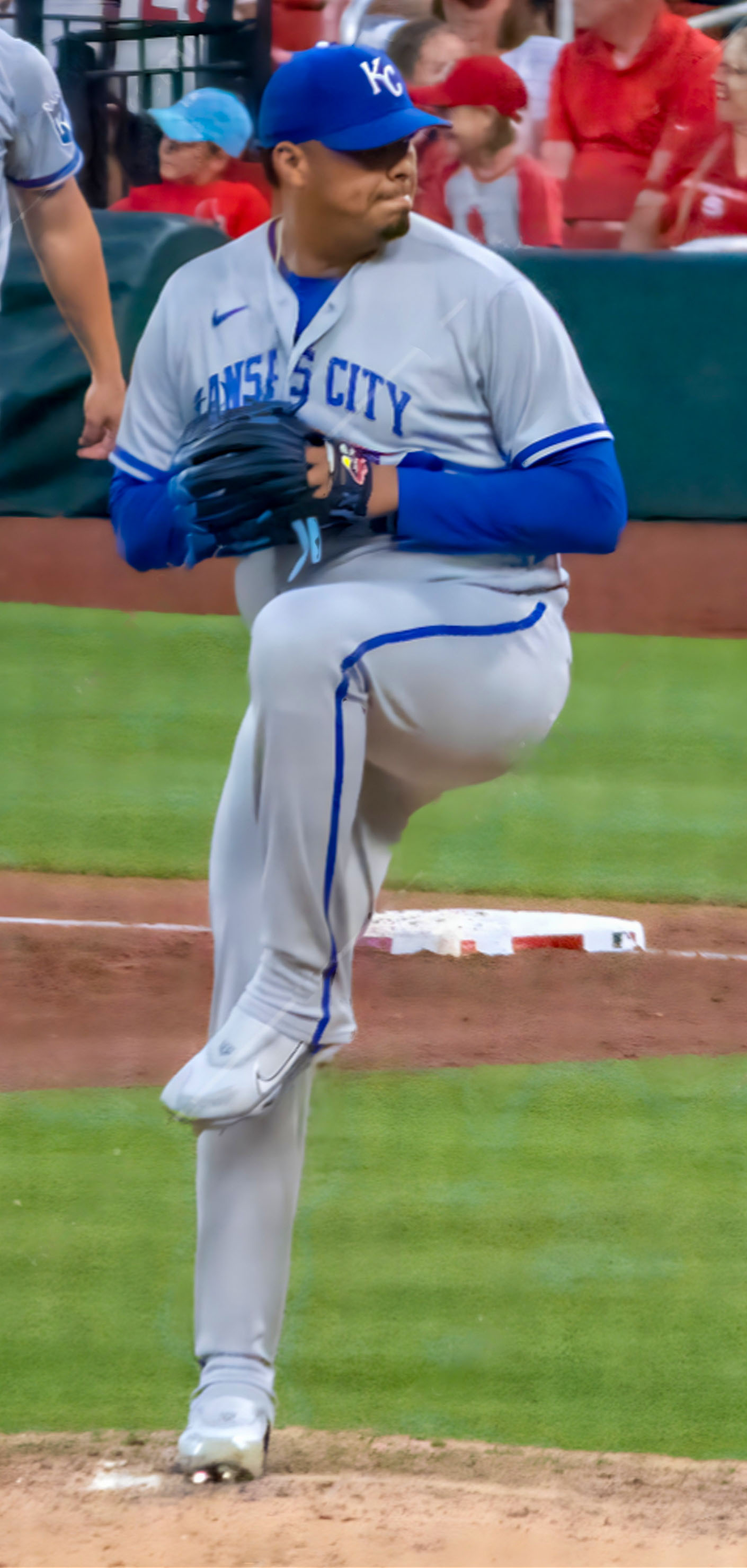
- Hernández with the Royals in 2023

Free agent
- Pitcher
- Born: March 11, 1997 (age 29); Guayana, Venezuela
- Bats: Right Throws: Right

MLB debut
- September 1, 2020, for the Kansas City Royals

MLB statistics (through 2026 season)
- Win–loss record: 8–19
- Earned run average: 5.14
- Strikeouts: 269
- Stats at Baseball Reference

Teams
- Kansas City Royals (2020–2024); Philadelphia Phillies (2025); Detroit Tigers (2025); Cleveland Guardians (2025–2026)

Carlos Eduardo Hernández (born March 11, 1997) is a Venezuelan professional baseball pitcher who is a free agent. He has previously played in Major League Baseball (MLB) for the Kansas City Royals, Philadelphia Phillies, Detroit Tigers, and Cleveland Guardians. He made his MLB debut in 2020.

== Career ==
=== Kansas City Royals ===
Hernández signed with the Kansas City Royals as an international free agent on July 19, 2016, for a $15,000 signing bonus. He spent his professional debut season of 2017 with the Burlington Royals, pitching to a 1–4 win–loss record with a 5.49 earned run average (ERA) and 62 strikeouts over 62 1/3 innings. He played for the Lexington Legends in 2018, going 6–5 with a 3.29 ERA and 82 strikeouts over 79 1/3 innings. Hernández suffered a stress fracture in his rib cage during spring training in 2019 and did not make his season debut until June 21. He split the 2019 season between the rookie-level Arizona League Royals, Burlington, and Lexington, going a combined 3–5 with a 5.31 ERA and 68 strikeouts over 57 2/3 innings.

On November 20, 2019, the Royals added Hernández to their 40-man roster to protect him from the Rule 5 draft. On September 1, 2020, Hernández was promoted to the major leagues for the first time and made his debut that day against the Cleveland Indians, pitching 3 2/3 scoreless innings. Hernández appeared in five games for the 2020 Royals, compiling an 0–1 record, 4.91 ERA, and 13 strikeouts in 14 2/3 innings pitched. In 2021, he had a 6–2 record, 3.68 ERA, and 74 strikeouts in 85 2/3 innings for Kansas City.

Hernández made 27 appearances (7 starts) for the Royals during the 2022 campaign, struggling to an 0-5 record and 7.39 ERA with 35 strikeouts over 56 innings of work. In 2023, he pitched in 67 contests for Kansas City, logging a 1-10 record and 5.27 ERA with 77 strikeouts and 4 saves across 70 innings.

Hernández made 27 appearances out of the bullpen for Kansas City during the 2024 season, compiling an 0-1 record and 3.30 ERA with 27 strikeouts across 30 innings pitched.

=== Philadelphia Phillies ===
On March 23, 2025, Hernández was claimed off of outright waivers by the Philadelphia Phillies. He made 25 appearances for Philadelphia, posting a 1–0 record and 5.26 ERA with 23 strikeouts across 25 2/3 innings pitched. Hernández was designated for assignment by the Phillies on June 11.

=== Detroit Tigers ===
On June 16, 2025, Hernández was claimed off waivers by the Detroit Tigers. In 11 appearances for Detroit, he struggled to a 10.13 ERA with 13 strikeouts across 10 2/3 innings pitched. Hernández was designated for assignment by the Tigers on July 24.

=== Cleveland Guardians ===
On July 31, 2025, Hernández was claimed off waivers by the Cleveland Guardians. In five appearances for the Guardians, he recorded a 3.86 ERA with three strikeouts across seven innings of work. On August 20, Hernández was designated for assignment by Cleveland following the promotion of Parker Messick. He cleared waivers and was sent outright to the Triple-A Columbus Clippers on August 22. Hernández elected free agency on October 10.

On November 7, 2025, Hernández re-signed with the Guardians on a minor league contract that included an invitation to spring training. In 12 appearances for the Triple–A Columbus Clippers, he logged an 0–1 record and 5.40 ERA with 20 strikeouts and two saves. Hernández had his contract selected to the major league roster on September 1, 2026. In two appearances for Cleveland, he recorded a 6.00 ERA with four strikeouts over three innings pitched. Hernández was designated for assignment by the Guardians on September 4; he cleared waivers and was sent outright to Triple–A Columbus two days later. On October 20, he elected to become a free agent.
