= 2021 Minnesota Twins season =

2021 Minnesota Twins
- League: American League
- Division: Central
- Ballpark: Target Field
- City: Minneapolis, Minnesota
- Record: 73–89 (.451)
- Divisional place: 5th
- Owners: Jim Pohlad
- President of baseball operations: Derek Falvey
- General manager: Thad Levine
- Managers: Rocco Baldelli
- Television: Bally Sports North (Dick Bremer, Justin Morneau) (Marney Gellner) (Audra Martin)
- Radio: WCCO (Cory Provus, Dan Gladden)
- Stats: ESPN.com; Baseball Reference

The 2021 Minnesota Twins season was the 61st season for the Minnesota Twins franchise in the Twin Cities of Minnesota, their 12th season at Target Field and the 121st overall in the American League. The Twins were favored to win the American League Central for the third straight season, and hopes were high that they would break their American sports-leading 18 straight postseason losses. However, due to injuries to players such as superstar center fielder Byron Buxton, the Twins had a poor season, falling from first place in the AL Central the previous two seasons to last in 2021 with a 73–89 record and missing the postseason for the first time since 2018.

== Regular season ==
=== Season standings ===
AL Central
Team	W	L	Pct.	GB	Home	Road
Chicago White Sox	93	69	.574	—	53‍–‍28	40‍–‍41
Cleveland Indians	80	82	.494	13	40‍–‍41	40‍–‍41
Detroit Tigers	77	85	.475	16	42‍–‍39	35‍–‍46
Kansas City Royals	74	88	.457	19	39‍–‍42	35‍–‍46
Minnesota Twins	73	89	.451	20	38‍–‍43	35‍–‍46

Division leaders
Team	W	L	Pct.
Tampa Bay Rays	100	62	.617
Houston Astros	95	67	.586
Chicago White Sox	93	69	.574

Wild Card teams (Top 2 teams qualify for postseason)
Team	W	L	Pct.	GB
Boston Red Sox	92	70	.568	—
New York Yankees	92	70	.568	—
Toronto Blue Jays	91	71	.562	1
Seattle Mariners	90	72	.556	2
Oakland Athletics	86	76	.531	6
Cleveland Indians	80	82	.494	12
Los Angeles Angels	77	85	.475	15
Detroit Tigers	77	85	.475	15
Kansas City Royals	74	88	.457	18
Minnesota Twins	73	89	.451	19
Texas Rangers	60	102	.370	32
Baltimore Orioles	52	110	.321	40

=== Records vs. AL opponents ===
2021 American League record Source: MLB Standings Grid – 2021
Team	BAL	BOS	CWS	CLE	DET	HOU	KC	LAA	MIN	NYY	OAK	SEA	TB	TEX	TOR	NL
Baltimore	—	6–13	0–7	2–5	2–5	3–3	4–3	2–4	2–4	8–11	3–3	3–4	1–18	4–3	5–14	7–13
Boston	13–6	—	3–4	4–2	3–3	2–5	5–2	3–3	5–2	10–9	3–3	4–3	8–11	3–4	10–9	16–4
Chicago	7–0	4–3	—	10–9	12–7	2–5	9–10	2–5	13–6	1–5	4–3	3–3	3–3	5–1	4–3	14–6
Cleveland	5–2	2–4	9–10	—	12–7	1–6	14–5	5–1	8–11	3–4	2–4	3–4	1–6	4–2	2–5	9–11
Detroit	5–2	3–3	7–12	7–12	—	5–2	8–11	1–6	8–11	3–3	1–6	5–1	4–3	6–1	3–3	11–9
Houston	3–3	5–2	5–2	6–1	2–5	—	3–4	13–6	3–4	2–4	11–8	11–8	4–2	14–5	4–2	9–11
Kansas City	3–4	2–5	10–9	5–14	11–8	4–3	—	2–4	10–9	2–4	2–5	4–3	2–4	2–4	3–4	12–8
Los Angeles	4–2	3–3	5–2	1–5	6–1	6–13	4–2	—	5–2	4–3	4–15	8–11	1–6	11–8	4–3	11–9
Minnesota	4–2	2–5	6–13	11–8	11–8	4–3	9–10	2–5	—	1–6	1–5	2–4	3–3	4–3	3–4	10–10
New York	11–8	9–10	5–1	4–3	3–3	4–2	4–2	3–4	6–1	—	4–3	5–2	8–11	6–1	8–11	12–8
Oakland	3–3	3–3	3–4	4–2	6–1	8–11	5–2	15–4	5–1	3–4	—	4–15	4–3	10–9	2–5	11–9
Seattle	4–3	3–4	3–3	4–3	1–5	8–11	3–4	11–8	4–2	2–5	15–4	—	6–1	13–6	4–2	9–11
Tampa Bay	18–1	11–8	3–3	6–1	3–4	2–4	4–2	6–1	3–3	11–8	3–4	1–6	—	3–4	11–8	15–5
Texas	3–4	4–3	1–5	2–4	1–6	5–14	4–2	8–11	3–4	1–6	9–10	6–13	4–3	—	2–4	7–13
Toronto	14–5	9–10	3–4	5–2	3–3	2–4	4–3	3–4	4–3	11–8	5–2	2–4	8–11	4–2	—	14–6

Updated with the results of all games through October 3, 2021.

== Game log ==
Legend
	Twins win
	Twins loss
	Postponement
**Bold**	Twins team member

2021 Game Log: 73−89 (Home: 38–43; Away: 35–46)
April: 9–15 (Home: 4–7; Away: 5–8)

#	Date	Opponent	Score	Win	Loss	Save	Attendance	Record	Streak
1	April 1	@ Brewers	5–6 (10)	Hader (1–0)	**Dobnak** (0–1)	—	11,740	0–1	L1
2	April 3	@ Brewers	2–0	**Berríos** (1–0)	Burnes (0–1)	**Colomé** (1)	11,383	1–1	W1
3	April 4	@ Brewers	8–2	**Pineda** (1–0)	Houser (0–1)	—	10,666	2–1	W2
4	April 5	@ Tigers	15–6	**Shoemaker** (1–0)	Ureña (0–1)	**Dobnak** (1)	7,232	3–1	W3
5	April 6	@ Tigers	3–4 (10)	Soto (1–0)	**Robles** (0–1)	—	7,306	3–2	L1
6	April 7	@ Tigers	3–2	**Maeda** (1–0)	Boyd (1–1)	**Colomé** (2)	7,568	4–2	W1
7	April 8	Mariners	10–2	**Berríos** (2–0)	Gonzales (0–1)	—	9,675	5–2	W2
8	April 10	Mariners	3–4 (10)	Graveman (1–0)	**Rogers** (0–1)	Middleton (1)	9,817	5–3	L1
9	April 11	Mariners	6–8	Steckenrider (1–1)	**Colomé** (0–1)	Montero (2)	9,792	5–4	L2
–	April 12	Red Sox	Postponed (Protests due to Daunte Wright shooting; Makeup: April 14)						
10	April 13	Red Sox	2–4	Ottavino (1–0)	**Dobnak** (0–2)	Barnes (1)	6,724	5–5	L3
11	April 14 (1)	Red Sox	2–3 (7)	Eovaldi (2–1)	**Maeda** (1–1)	Barnes (2)	7,074	5–6	L4
12	April 14 (2)	Red Sox	1–7 (7)	Rodríguez (2–0)	**Berríos** (2–1)	—	7,074	5–7	L5
13	April 15	Red Sox	4–3	**Colomé** (1–1)	Ottavino (1–1)	—	7,925	6–7	W1
14	April 16	@ Angels	3–10	Slegers (1–0)	**Dobnak** (0–3)	—	13,428	6–8	L1
—	April 17	@ Angels	Postponed (COVID-19; Makeup: May 20)						
—	April 18	@ Angels	Postponed (COVID-19; Makeup: May 20)						
—	April 19	@ Athletics	Postponed (COVID-19; Makeup: April 20)						
15	April 20 (1)	@ Athletics	0–7 (7)	Manaea (2–1)	**Shoemaker** (1–1)	—	3,322	6–9	L2
16	April 20 (2)	@ Athletics	0–1 (7)	Luzardo (1–1)	**Berríos** (2–2)	Diekman (1)	3,322	6–10	L3
17	April 21	@ Athletics	12–13 (10)	Guerra (1–0)	**Colomé** (1–2)	—	3,405	6–11	L4
18	April 23	Pirates	2–0	**Happ** (1–0)	Brubaker (2–1)	**Rogers** (1)	9,541	7–11	W1
19	April 24	Pirates	2–6	Cahill (1–2)	**Pineda** (1–1)	—	9,718	7–12	L1
20	April 25	Pirates	2–6	Holmes (1–0)	**Shoemaker** (1–2)	—	9,396	7–13	L2
21	April 26	@ Indians	3–5 (10)	Clase (2–1)	**Colomé** (1–3)	—	4,555	7–14	L3
22	April 27	@ Indians	4–7	Civale (4–0)	**Maeda** (1–2)	Karinchak (2)	6,303	7–15	L4
23	April 28	@ Indians	10–2	**Happ** (2–0)	Allen (1–4)	—	5,903	8–15	W1
24	April 30	Royals	9–1	**Pineda** (2–1)	Singer (1–3)	—	9,982	9–15	W2

May: 13–16 (Home: 8–10; Away: 5–6)

#	Date	Opponent	Score	Win	Loss	Save	Attendance	Record	Streak
25	May 1	Royals	3–11	Duffy (4–1)	**Shoemaker** (1–3)	—	9,993	9–16	L1
26	May 2	Royals	13–4	**Berríos** (3–2)	Keller (2–3)	—	9,997	10–16	W1
27	May 3	Rangers	6–5	**Maeda** (2–2)	Dunning (1–2)	**Rogers** (2)	8,071	11–16	W2
28	May 4	Rangers	3–6 (10)	Rodríguez (1–1)	**Waddell** (0–1)	Kennedy (8)	8,022	11–17	L1
29	May 5	Rangers	1–3	King (3–1)	**Thorpe** (0–1)	Kennedy (9)	7,853	11–18	L2
30	May 6	Rangers	3–4 (10)	Hearn (1–1)	**Duffey** (0–1)	Sborz (1)	8,760	11–19	L3
31	May 7	@ Tigers	7–3	**Shoemaker** (2–3)	Skubal (0–5)	—	7,377	12–19	W1
32	May 8	@ Tigers	3–7	Fulmer (2–2)	**Duffey** (0–2)	—	8,000	12–20	L1
—	May 9	@ Tigers	Postponed (rain, makeup July 16)						
33	May 11	@ White Sox	3–9	Crochet (1–2)	**Alcalá** (0–1)	—	7,962	12–21	L2
34	May 12	@ White Sox	8–13	Keuchel (2–1)	**Happ** (2–1)	—	8,393	12–22	L3
35	May 13	@ White Sox	2–4	Lynn (4–2)	**Pineda** (2–2)	Hendriks (7)	8,188	12–23	L4
36	May 14	Athletics	1–6	Montas (5–2)	**Shoemaker** (2–4)	—	9,778	12–24	L5
37	May 15	Athletics	5–4	**Colomé** (2–3)	Diekman (2–1)	**Robles** (1)	12,212	13–24	W1
38	May 16	Athletics	6–7	Trivino (2–1)	**Rogers** (0–2)	—	10,270	13–25	L1
39	May 17	White Sox	4–16	Keuchel (3–1)	**Happ** (2–2)	—	8,431	13–26	L2
40	May 18	White Sox	5–4	**Rogers** (1–2)	Bummer (0–2)	—	9,504	14–26	W1
41	May 19	White Sox	1–2	Giolito (3–4)	**Shoemaker** (2–5)	Hendriks (9)	8,608	14–27	L1
42	May 20 (1)	@ Angels	1–7 (7)	Cobb (2–2)	**Thorpe** (0–2)	—	9,920	14–28	L2
43	May 20 (2)	@ Angels	6–3 (7)	**Berríos** (4–2)	Canning (3–3)	**Robles** (2)	9,820	15–28	W1
44	May 21	@ Indians	10–0	**Dobnak** (1–3)	McKenzie (1–3)	—	11,675	16–28	W2
45	May 22	@ Indians	3–5 (10)	Karinchak (2–0)	**Colomé** (2–4)	—	11,505	16–29	L1
46	May 23	@ Indians	8–5 (10)	**Robles** (1–1)	Karinchak (2–1)	**Duffey** (1)	9,805	17–29	W1
47	May 24	Orioles	8–3	**Alcalá** (1–1)	Scott (2–3)	—	8,530	18–29	W2
48	May 25	Orioles	7–4	**Berríos** (5–2)	Kremer (0–5)	**Rogers** (3)	9,969	19–29	W3
49	May 26	Orioles	3–2	**Pineda** (3–2)	López (1–6)	**Robles** (3)	10,574	20–29	W4
50	May 28	Royals	3–8	Bubic (1–0)	**Dobnak** (1–4)	—	14,260	20–30	L1
51	May 29	Royals	6–5	**Happ** (3–2)	Santana (0–1)	**Rogers** (4)	18,444	21–30	W1
52	May 30	Royals	3–6	Keller (5–4)	**Shoemaker** (2–6)	Holland (3)	17,923	21–31	L1
53	May 31	@ Orioles	3–2 (10)	**Rogers** (3–3)	Plutko (1–2)	**Robles** (4)	11,010	22–31	W1

June: 11–14 (Home: 5–6; Away: 6–8)

#	Date	Opponent	Score	Win	Loss	Save	Attendance	Record	Streak
54	June 1	@ Orioles	4–7	Zimmermann (3–3)	**Pineda** (3–3)	Sulser (1)	5,337	22–32	L1
55	June 2	@ Orioles	3–6	Wells (1–0)	**Dobnak** (1–5)	—	5,945	22–33	L2
56	June 3	@ Royals	5–6	Junis (2–3)	**Robles** (1–2)	Barlow (2)	11,072	22–34	L3
57	June 4	@ Royals	5–14	Keller (6–4)	**Shoemaker** (2–7)	—	22,612	22–35	L4
58	June 5	@ Royals	5–4	**Berríos** (6–2)	Minor (4–3)	**Robles** (5)	21,574	23–35	W1
59	June 6	@ Royals	2–1	**Farrell** (1–0)	Singer (3–5)	**Rogers** (5)	14,046	24–35	W2
60	June 8	Yankees	4–8	Loáisiga (5–2)	**Rogers** (2–3)	—	17,949	24–36	L1
61	June 9	Yankees	6–9	Cole (7–3)	**Dobnak** (1–6)	—	17,078	24–37	L2
62	June 10	Yankees	7–5	**Robles** (2–2)	Chapman (4–1)	—	17,728	25–37	W1
63	June 11	Astros	4–6	Stanek (1–1)	**Shoemaker** (2–8)	Pressly (10)	17,223	25–38	L1
64	June 12	Astros	5–2	**Berríos** (6–2)	García (5–4)	**Rogers** (6)	18,767	26–38	W1
65	June 13	Astros	3–14	Valdez (3–0)	**Pineda** (3–4)	—	19,147	26–39	L1
66	June 14	@ Mariners	3–4	Sewald (3–2)	**Robles** (2–3)	Steckenrider (1)	9,185	26–40	L2
67	June 15	@ Mariners	0–10	Flexen (6–3)	**Happ** (3–3)	—	7,669	26–41	L3
68	June 16	@ Mariners	7–2	**Thielbar** (1–0)	Sheffield (5–6)	—	8,098	27–41	W1
69	June 18	@ Rangers	7–5 (10)	**Robles** (3–3)	Sborz (3–3)	**Duffey** (2)	30,304	28–41	W2
70	June 19	@ Rangers	3–2	**Thielbar** (2–0)	King (5–5)	**Rogers** (7)	34,044	29–41	W3
71	June 20	@ Rangers	4–2	**Maeda** (3–2)	Dunning (2–6)	**Robles** (6)	34,007	30–41	W4
72	June 21	Reds	7–5 (12)	**Shoemaker** (3–8)	Hembree (1–3)	—	17,530	31–41	W5
73	June 22	Reds	7–10	Antone (2–0)	**Robles** (3–4)	Garrett (4)	19,187	31–42	L1
74	June 24	Indians	1–4	Parker (1–0)	**Alcalá** (1–2)	Karinchak (9)	18,812	31–43	L2
75	June 25	Indians	8–7	**Jax** (1–0)	Wittgren (2–2)	**Robles** (7)	16,892	32–43	W1
—	June 26	Indians	Postponed (rain, makeup September 14)						
76	June 27	Indians	8–2	**Happ** (4–3)	Hentges (1–2)	—	20,215	33–43	W2
—	June 28	@ White Sox	Postponed (rain, makeup July 19)						
77	June 29	@ White Sox	6–7	Giolito (6–5)	**Maeda** (3–3)	Hendriks (21)	17,382	33–44	L1
78	June 30	@ White Sox	3–13	Cease (7–3)	**Ober** (0–1)	—	16,803	33–45	L2

July: 11–16 (Home: 7–7; Away: 4–9)

#	Date	Opponent	Score	Win	Loss	Save	Attendance	Record	Streak
79	July 1	@ White Sox	5–8	Kopech (3–0)	**Alcalá** (1–3)	—	29,944	33–46	L3
80	July 2	@ Royals	4–7	Lovelady (1–0)	**Happ** (4–4)	Barlow (3)	31,824	33–47	L4
81	July 3	@ Royals	3–6	Zimmer (4–0)	**Jax** (1–1)	Barlow (4)	16,133	33–48	L5
82	July 4	@ Royals	6–2	**Maeda** (4–3)	Keller (6–9)	—	15,350	34–48	W1
83	July 5	White Sox	8–5	**Ober** (1–1)	Cease (7–4)	**Robles** (8)	20,321	35–48	W2
84	July 6	White Sox	1–4	Rodón (7–3)	**Berríos** (7–3)	Hendriks (22)	18,437	35–49	L1
85	July 7	White Sox	1–6	Lynn (9–3)	**Pineda** (3–5)	—	19,664	35–50	L2
86	July 8	Tigers	5–3	**Happ** (5–4)	Skubal (5–8)	**Rogers** (8)	18,192	36–50	W1
87	July 9	Tigers	4–2	**Alcalá** (2–3)	Manning (1–3)	**Robles** (9)	21,725	37–50	W2
88	July 10	Tigers	9–4	**Coulombe** (1–0)	Jiménez (2–1)	—	21,030	38–50	W3
89	July 11	Tigers	12–9 (10)	**Duffey** (1–2)	Holland (1–2)	—	20,744	39–50	W4
-	July 13	**91st All-Star Game in Denver, CO**							
—	July 16 (1)	@ Tigers	Postponed (rain, makeup July 17)						
—	July 16 (2)	@ Tigers	Postponed (rain, makeup August 30)						
90	July 17 (1)	@ Tigers	0–1 (7)	Norris (1–3)	**Barnes** (0–1)	Soto (8)	13,747	39–51	L1
91	July 17 (2)	@ Tigers	4–5 (8)	Jiménez (3–1)	**Rogers** (2–4)	—	31,624	39–52	L2
92	July 18	@ Tigers	0–7	Peralta (3–1)	**Happ** (5–5)	—	15,854	39–53	L3
93	July 19 (1)	@ White Sox	3–2 (8)	**Duffey** (2–2)	Crochet (2–5)	**Robles** (10)	N/A	40–53	W1
94	July 19 (2)	@ White Sox	3–5 (7)	Bummer (2–4)	**Berríos** (7–4)	—	18,272	40–54	L1
95	July 20	@ White Sox	5–9	Burr (2–0)	**Alcalá** (2–4)	—	17,703	40–55	L2
96	July 21	@ White Sox	7–2	**Pineda** (4–5)	Cease (7–6)	—	25,600	41–55	W1
97	July 22	Angels	2–3	Heaney (6–7)	**Maeda** (4–4)	Iglesias (20)	23,337	41–56	L1
98	July 23	Angels	5–4	**Minaya** (1–0)	Iglesias (6–4)	**Rogers** (9)	21,384	42–56	W1
99	July 24	Angels	1–2	Sandoval (3–4)	**Berríos** (7–5)	Iglesias (21)	22,240	42–57	L1
100	July 25	Angels	2–6	Barría (1–0)	**Coulombe** (1–1)	—	23,158	42–58	L2
101	July 26	Tigers	6–5 (10)	**Thielbar** (3–0)	Soto (4–2)	—	17,713	43–58	W1
102	July 27	Tigers	5–6 (11)	Cisnero (2–4)	**Alcalá** (2–5)	Norris (1)	17,643	43–59	L1
103	July 28	Tigers	14–17	Holland (2–2)	**Happ** (5–6)	—	17,817	43–60	L2
104	July 30	@ Cardinals	1–5	Helsley (6–4)	**Duffey** (2–3)	—	34,036	43–61	L3
105	July 31	@ Cardinals	8–1	**Alcalá** (3–5)	Woodford (2–3)	—	33,432	44–61	W1

August: 14–13 (Home: 8–5; Away: 6–8)

#	Date	Opponent	Score	Win	Loss	Save	Attendance	Record	Streak
106	August 1	@ Cardinals	3–7	Wainwright (9–6)	**Pineda** (4–6)	—	28,975	44–62	L1
107	August 3	@ Reds	7–5	**Coulombe** (2–1)	Hembree (2–6)	**Colomé** (3)	18,396	45–62	W1
108	August 4	@ Reds	5–6	Castillo (6–10)	**Barnes** (0–2)	Lorenzen (1)	16,828	45–63	L1
109	August 5	@ Astros	5–3	**Jax** (2–1)	Valdez (7–3)	**Colomé** (4)	26,208	46–63	W1
110	August 6	@ Astros	5–4 (11)	**Minaya** (2–0)	Montero (5–4)	—	29,631	47–63	W2
111	August 7	@ Astros	0–4	García (8–6)	**Pineda** (4–7)	—	29,647	47–64	L1
112	August 8	@ Astros	7–5	**Maeda** (5–4)	McCullers Jr. (9–3)	**Colomé** (5)	26,825	48–64	W1
113	August 9	White Sox	1–11	Giolito (9–8)	**Burrows** (0–1)	—	17,858	48–65	L1
114	August 10	White Sox	4–3	**Jax** (3–1)	Keuchel (7–6)	**Colomé** (6)	18,302	49–65	W1
115	August 11	White Sox	1–0	**Thielbar** (4–0)	Ruiz (1–2)	**Colomé** (7)	22,370	50–65	W2
116	August 13	Rays	4–10	McClanahan (7–4)	**Pineda** (4–8)	Phillips (1)	23,125	50–66	L1
117	August 14	Rays	12–0	**Maeda** (6–4)	Wacha (2–4)	—	21,034	51–66	W1
118	August 15	Rays	5–4	**Colomé** (3–4)	Wisler (3–5)	—	22,467	52–66	W2
119	August 16	Indians	5–4 (10)	**Thielbar** (5–0)	Wittgren (2–6)	—	15,622	53–66	W3
120	August 17	Indians	1–3	Morgan (2–5)	**Ober** (1–2)	Clase (17)	19,605	53–67	L1
121	August 18	Indians	8–7 (11)	**Coulombe** (3–1)	Garza (2–1)	—	19,949	54–67	W1
122	August 19	@ Yankees	5–7	Taillon (8–4)	**Gant** (4–7)	Green (6)	30,019	54–68	L1
123	August 20	@ Yankees	2–10	Cortés Jr. (2–1)	**Barnes** (0–3)	—	39,124	54–69	L2
124	August 21	@ Yankees	1–7	Cole (12–6)	**Maeda** (6–5)	—	35,247	54–70	L3
—	August 22	@ Yankees	Postponed (rain, makeup September 13)						
125	August 24	@ Red Sox	9–11	Taylor (1–0)	**Jax** (3–2)	Robles (11)	27,986	54–71	L4
126	August 25	@ Red Sox	9–6 (10)	**Colomé** (4–4)	Robles (3–5)	—	28,923	55–71	W1
127	August 26	@ Red Sox	2–12	Sale (3–0)	**Gant** (4–8)	—	33,746	55–72	L1
128	August 27	Brewers	2–0	**Albers** (1–0)	Lauer (4–5)	**Colomé** (8)	20,280	56–72	W1
129	August 28	Brewers	6–4	**Thielbar** (6–0)	Houser (7–6)	**Colomé** (9)	29,342	57–72	W2
130	August 29	Brewers	2–6	Ashby (1–0)	**Jax** (3–3)	—	26,186	57–73	L1
131	August 30	@ Tigers	3–2	**Ober** (2–2)	Mize (7–7)	**Colomé** (10)	13,425	58–73	W1
132	August 31	Cubs	1–3	Rodríguez (3–2)	**Gant** (4–9)	Wick (1)	22,224	58–74	L1

September: 13–14 (Home: 6–8; Away: 7–6)

#	Date	Opponent	Score	Win	Loss	Save	Attendance	Record	Streak
133	September 1	Cubs	0–3	Steele (3–2)	**Ryan** (0–1)	Alzolay (1)	21,784	58–75	L2
134	September 3	@ Rays	3–5	Wacha (3–4)	**Dobnak** (1–7)	Kittredge (6)	8,864	58–76	L3
135	September 4	@ Rays	4–11	Archer (1–1)	**Albers** (1–1)	Enns (1)	13,861	58–77	L4
136	September 5	@ Rays	6–5	**Duffey** (3–3)	Kittredge (8–3)	**Colomé** (11)	14,165	59–77	W1
137	September 6	@ Indians	5–2	**Pineda** (5–8)	Allen (1–6)	**Colomé** (12)	12,675	60–77	W2
138	September 7	@ Indians	3–0	**Gant** (5–9)	Civale (10–3)	**Colomé** (13)	10,448	61–77	W3
139	September 8	@ Indians	3–0	**Ryan** (1–1)	McKenzie (4–6)	**Duffey** (3)	11,037	62–77	W4
140	September 9	@ Indians	1–4	Quantrill (5–3)	**Albers** (1–2)	Clase (22)	11,846	62–78	L1
141	September 10	Royals	4–6 (11)	Santana (2–2)	**Minaya** (2–1)	Holland (8)	20,803	62–79	L2
142	September 11	Royals	9–2	**Pineda** (6–8)	Singer (4–10)	—	19,532	63–79	W1
143	September 12	Royals	3–5	Brentz (4–2)	**Alcalá** (3–6)	Barlow (12)	19,496	63–80	L1
144	September 13	@ Yankees	5–6 (10)	Holmes (8−3)	**Garza Jr.** (1−3)	—	31,528	63–81	L2
145	September 14 (1)	Indians	1–3 (7)	McKenzie (5–6)	**Coulombe** (3–2)	Clase (23)	15,319	63–82	L3
146	September 14 (2)	Indians	6–3 (7)	**Barraclough** (1–0)	Allen (1–7)	**Colomé** (14)	18,905	64–82	W1
147	September 15	Indians	3–12	Quantrill (6–3)	**Jax** (3–4)	—	14,222	64–83	L1
148	September 17	@ Blue Jays	7–3	**Pineda** (7–8)	Ryu (13–9)	—	14,798	65–83	W1
149	September 18	@ Blue Jays	2–6	Matz (13–7)	**Ober** (2–3)	—	14,722	65–84	L1
150	September 19	@ Blue Jays	3–5	Berríos (12–8)	**Farrell** (1–1)	Romano (19)	14,601	65–85	L2
151	September 21	@ Cubs	9–5	**Barraclough** (2–0)	Mills (6–7)	—	25,594	66–85	W1
152	September 22	@ Cubs	5–4	**Ryan** (2–1)	Hendricks (14–7)	**Colomé** (15)	24,402	67–85	W2
153	September 23	Blue Jays	7–2	**Pineda** (8–8)	Hatch (0–1)	**Garza Jr.** (1)	15,509	68–85	W3
154	September 24	Blue Jays	3–1	**Ober** (3–3)	Berríos (12–9)	**Colomé** (16)	18,861	69–85	W4
155	September 25	Blue Jays	1–6	Ray (13–6)	**Gant** (5–10)	—	27,183	69–86	L1
156	September 26	Blue Jays	2–5	Manoah (8–2)	**Jax** (3–5)	Romano (21)	20,676	69–87	L2
157	September 28	Tigers	3–2	**Thielbar** (7–0)	Alexander (2–4)	**Colomé** (17)	16,329	70–87	W1
158	September 29	Tigers	5–2	**Pineda** (9–8)	Mize (7–9)	—	17,254	71–87	W2
159	September 30	Tigers	7–10	Lange (1–3)	**Garza Jr.** (1–4)	Fulmer (13)	21,186	71–88	L1

October: 2–1 (Home: 0–0; Away: 2–1)

#	Date	Opponent	Score	Win	Loss	Save	Attendance	Record	Streak
160	October 1	@ Royals	6–11	Heasley (1–1)	**Gant** (5–11)	—	14,293	71–89	L2
161	October 2	@ Royals	4–0	**Jax** (4–5)	Bubic (6–7)	—	22,321	72–89	W1
162	October 3	@ Royals	7–3	**Vincent** (1–0)	Kowar (0–6)	**Alcalá** (1)	17,158	73–89	W2

== Player stats ==
=== Batting ===
Note: G = Games played; AB = At bats; R = Runs scored; H = Hits; 2B = Doubles; 3B = Triples; HR = Home runs; RBI = Runs batted in; AVG = Batting average; SB = Stolen bases

Player	G	AB	R	H	2B	3B	HR	RBI	AVG	SB
Jorge Alcala	4	0	0	0	0	0	0	0	—	0
Luis Arráez	121	428	58	126	17	6	2	42	.294	2
Willians Astudillo	72	208	17	49	8	0	7	21	.236	0
Charlie Barnes	1	1	0	0	0	0	0	0	.000	0
Kyle Barraclough	1	0	0	0	0	0	0	0	—	0
Jose Berrios	1	2	0	0	0	0	0	0	.000	0
Travis Blankenhorn	1	0	1	0	0	0	0	0	—	0
Beau Burrows	2	0	0	0	0	0	0	0	—	0
Byron Buxton	61	235	50	72	23	0	19	32	.306	9
Jake Cave	76	164	14	31	6	1	3	13	.189	1
Gilberto Celestino	23	59	7	8	3	0	2	3	.136	0
Alex Colome	6	0	0	0	0	0	0	0	—	0
Danny Coulombe	5	1	0	0	0	0	0	0	.000	0
Nelson Cruz	85	296	44	87	13	1	19	50	.294	3
Randy Dobnak	1	0	0	0	0	0	0	0	—	0
Josh Donaldson	135	457	73	113	26	0	26	72	.247	0
Tyler Duffey	5	0	0	0	0	0	0	0	—	0
John Gant	2	0	0	0	0	0	0	0	—	0
Kyle Garlick	36	99	17	23	8	0	5	10	.232	1
Mitch Garver	68	207	29	53	15	0	13	34	.256	1
Nick Gordon	73	200	19	48	9	1	4	23	.240	10
Griffin Jax	2	3	0	0	0	0	0	0	.000	0
Ryan Jeffers	85	267	28	53	10	1	14	35	.199	0
Max Kepler	121	426	61	90	21	4	19	54	.211	10
Alex Kirilloff	59	215	23	54	11	1	8	34	.251	1
Trevor Larnach	79	260	29	58	12	0	7	28	.223	1
Tzu-Wei Lin	1	0	0	0	0	0	0	0	—	0
Kenta Maeda	4	3	2	1	0	0	0	0	.333	0
Juan Minaya	3	0	0	0	0	0	0	0	—	0
Bailey Ober	1	2	0	1	0	0	0	0	.500	0
Michael Pineda	2	3	0	0	0	0	0	0	.000	0
Jorge Polanco	152	588	97	158	35	2	33	98	.269	11
Rob Refsnyder	51	139	21	34	7	0	2	12	.245	1
JT Riddle	4	6	1	2	0	0	0	0	.333	0
Hansel Robles	2	0	0	0	0	0	0	0	—	0
Taylor Rogers	2	0	0	0	0	0	0	0	—	0
Brent Rooker	58	189	25	38	10	0	9	16	.201	0
Ben Rortvedt	39	89	8	15	1	0	3	7	.169	0
Joe Ryan	1	2	0	0	0	0	0	0	.000	0
Miguel Sano	135	470	68	105	24	0	30	75	.223	2
Andrelton Simmons	131	412	37	92	12	0	3	31	.223	1
Cody Stashak	2	0	0	0	0	0	0	0	—	0
Caleb Thielbar	4	0	0	0	0	0	0	0	—	0
Team totals	162	5431	729	1311	271	17	228	690	.241	54

=== Pitching ===
Note: W = Wins; L = Losses; ERA = Earned run average; G = Games pitched; GS = Games started; SV = Saves; IP = Innings pitched; R = Total runs allowed; ER = Earned runs allowed; BB = Walks allowed; K = Strikeouts

Player	W	L	ERA	G	GS	SV	IP	R	ER	BB	K
Andrew Albers	1	2	7.58	5	3	0	19.0	16	16	9	12
Jorge Alcala	3	6	3.92	59	0	1	59.2	29	26	13	61
Shaun Anderson	0	0	9.35	4	0	0	8.2	12	9	5	8
Willians Astudillo	0	0	2.25	4	0	0	4.0	1	1	2	0
Charlie Barnes	0	3	5.92	9	8	0	38.0	27	25	16	20
Kyle Barraclough	2	0	5.54	10	0	0	13.0	8	8	8	18
Jose Berrios	7	5	3.48	20	20	0	121.2	53	47	32	126
Beau Burrows	0	1	12.54	5	1	0	9.1	14	13	8	5
Alex Colome	4	4	4.15	67	0	17	65.0	41	30	23	58
Danny Coulombe	3	2	3.67	29	1	0	34.1	17	14	7	33
Randy Dobnak	1	7	7.64	14	6	0	50.2	44	43	12	27
Tyler Duffey	3	3	3.18	64	0	3	62.1	25	22	28	61
Luke Farrell	1	1	4.74	20	1	0	24.2	13	13	13	25
John Gant	1	5	5.61	14	7	0	33.2	24	21	15	36
Edgar Garcia	0	0	10.45	6	0	0	10.1	12	12	7	8
Ralph Garza Jr.	0	2	3.26	18	0	1	19.1	9	7	7	15
Ian Gibaut	0	0	2.70	3	0	0	6.2	2	2	2	4
J. A. Happ	5	6	6.77	19	19	0	98.1	76	74	31	77
Griffin Jax	4	5	6.37	18	14	0	82.0	62	58	29	65
Derek Law	0	0	4.20	9	0	0	15.0	7	7	8	14
Kenta Maeda	6	5	4.66	21	21	0	106.1	60	55	32	113
Juan Minaya	2	1	2.48	29	0	0	40.0	12	11	20	43
Jovani Moran	0	0	7.88	5	0	0	8.0	7	7	7	10
Bailey Ober	3	3	4.19	20	20	0	92.1	45	43	19	96
Michael Pineda	9	8	3.62	22	21	0	109.1	49	44	21	88
Hansel Robles	3	4	4.91	45	0	10	44.0	28	24	24	43
Taylor Rogers	2	4	3.35	40	0	9	40.1	18	15	8	59
Joe Ryan	2	1	4.05	5	5	0	26.2	12	12	5	30
Matt Shoemaker	3	8	8.06	16	11	0	60.1	56	54	27	40
Devin Smeltzer	0	0	0.00	1	0	0	4.2	1	0	1	3
Cody Stashak	0	0	6.89	15	0	0	15.2	12	12	10	26
Caleb Thielbar	7	0	3.23	59	0	0	64.0	24	23	20	77
Lewis Thorpe	0	2	4.70	5	4	0	15.1	11	8	7	6
Nick Vincent	1	0	0.71	7	0	0	12.2	1	1	5	9
Brandon Waddell	0	1	11.25	4	0	0	4.0	6	5	3	1
Team totals	73	89	4.83	162	162	42	1419.1	834	762	484	1317

== Roster ==
2021 Minnesota Twins
Roster
Pitchers: 77 Andrew Albers; 66 Jorge Alcalá; 41 Shaun Anderson; 85 Charlie Barnes; 45 Kyle Barraclough; 17 José Berríos; 41 Beau Burrows; 48 Álex Colomé; 53 Danny Coulombe; 68 Randy Dobnak; 21 Tyler Duffey; 51 Luke Farrell; 33 John Gant; 57 Édgar García; 32 Ralph Garza Jr.; 65 Ian Gibaut; 33 J. A. Happ; 83 Griffin Jax; 54 Derek Law; 18 Kenta Maeda; 49 Juan Minaya; 71 Jovani Morán; 82 Bailey Ober; 35 Michael Pineda; 57 Hansel Robles; 55 Taylor Rogers; 74 Joe Ryan; 32 Matt Shoemaker; 31 Devin Smeltzer; 61 Cody Stashak; 56 Caleb Thielbar; 43 Lewis Thorpe; 58 Nick Vincent; 58 Brandon Waddell	Catchers: 8 Mitch Garver; 27 Ryan Jeffers; 70 Ben Rortvedt; Infielders: 2 Luis Arráez; 64 Willians Astudillo; 13 Travis Blankenhorn; 20 Josh Donaldson; 11 Jorge Polanco; 15 J. T. Riddle; 22 Miguel Sanó; 9 Andrelton Simmons	Outfielders: 25 Byron Buxton; 60 Jake Cave; 79 Gilberto Celestino; 30 Kyle Garlick; 1 Nick Gordon; 26 Max Kepler; 19 Alex Kirilloff; 24 Trevor Larnach; 37 Tzu-Wei Lin; 38 Rob Refsnyder; 50 Brent Rooker; Other batters: 23 Nelson Cruz	Manager: 5 Rocco Baldelli; Coaches: 75 Nate Dammann (quality control); 46 Tony Diaz (third base); 67 Bill Evers (catching); 63 Rudy Hernandez (assistant hitting); 47 Wes Johnson (pitching); 97 Garrett Kennedy (bullpen catcher); 88 Pete Maki (bullpen); 12 Kevin Morgan (major league field coordinator); 98 Connor Olson (bullpen catcher); 84 Edgar Varela (hitting); 40 Tommy Watkins (first base)

== Farm system ==
Level	Team	League	Manager
AAA	St. Paul Saints	Triple-A East	Toby Gardenhire
AA	Wichita Wind Surge	Double-A Central	Ramon Borrego
A-Advanced	Cedar Rapids Kernels	High-A Central	Brian Dinkelman
A	Fort Myers Mighty Mussels	Low-A Southeast	Brian Meyer
Rookie	FCL Twins	Florida Complex League	Takashi Miyoshi
Rookie	DSL Twins	Dominican Summer League	
