= Danny Coulombe =

American baseball player (born 1989)

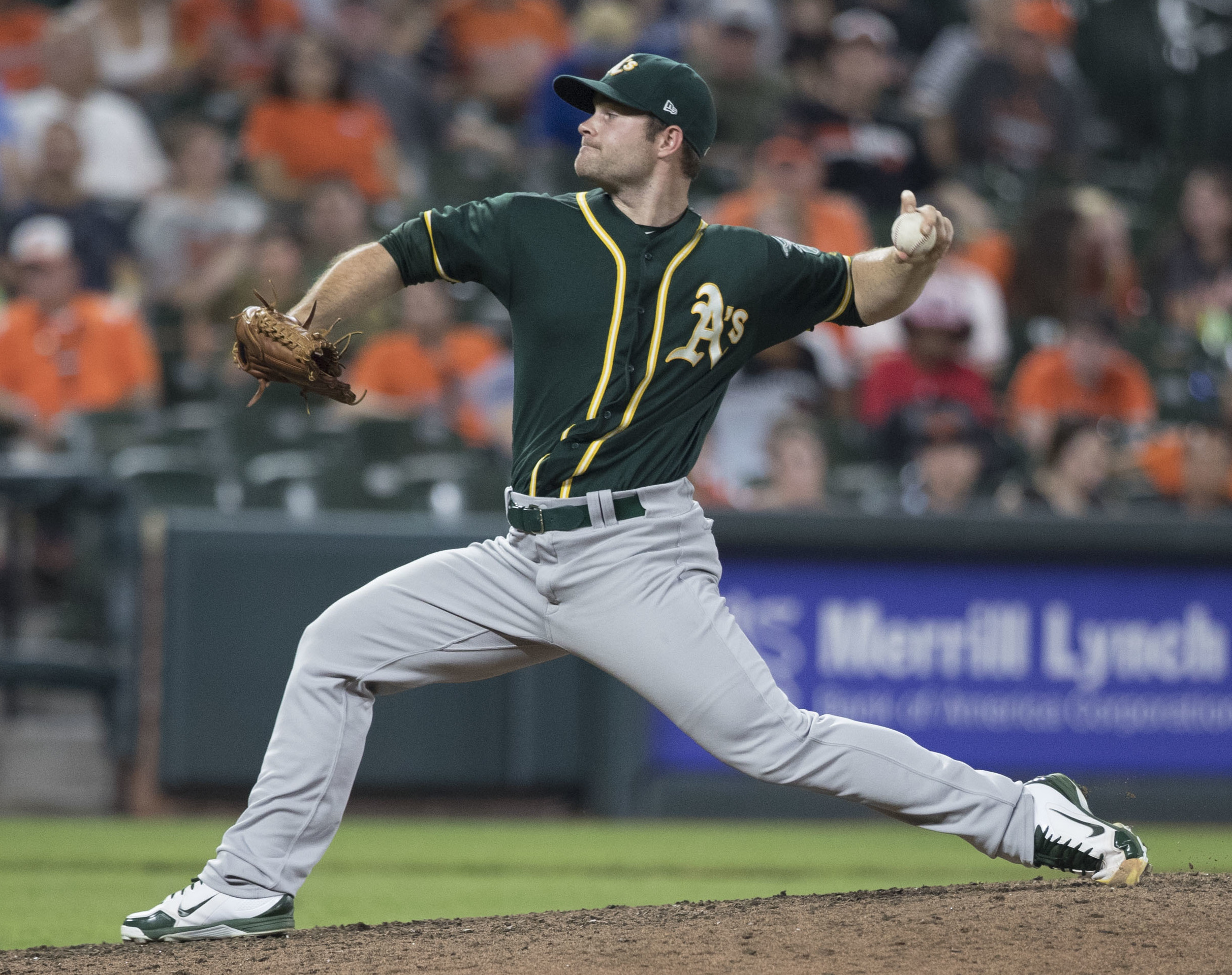
- Coulombe with the Oakland Athletics in 2017

Free agent
- Pitcher
- Born: October 26, 1989 (age 37); St. Louis, Missouri, U.S.
- Bats: Left Throws: Left

MLB debut
- September 16, 2014, for the Los Angeles Dodgers

MLB statistics (through July 11, 2026)
- Win–loss record: 17–12
- Earned run average: 3.43
- Strikeouts: 322
- Stats at Baseball Reference

Teams
- Los Angeles Dodgers (2014–2015); Oakland Athletics (2015–2018); Minnesota Twins (2020–2022); Baltimore Orioles (2023–2024); Minnesota Twins (2025); Texas Rangers (2025); Boston Red Sox (2026)

Daniel Paul Coulombe (born October 26, 1989) is an American professional baseball pitcher who is a free agent. He has previously played in Major League Baseball (MLB) for the Los Angeles Dodgers, Oakland Athletics, Baltimore Orioles, Minnesota Twins, Texas Rangers, and Boston Red Sox.

== Amateur career ==
Coulombe attended Chaparral High School in Scottsdale, Arizona. As a senior he was 9–0 with a 0.75 earned run average (ERA) and 138 strikeouts. He was named to the Rawlings All-America team, and was a Baseball America Third-team All-American and State Player of the Year. He set several school records including career strikeouts (288), single season strikeouts (138) and single game strikeouts (20). He was part of two state championship teams and the 2006 Connie Mack World Series champions.

The Los Angeles Dodgers selected Coulombe in the 17th round of the 2008 Major League Baseball draft, but he did not sign. He chose to attend the University of Southern California (USC) on an athletic scholarship to play college baseball for the USC Trojans. Coach Chad Kreuter said he expected Coulombe to be a "premier pitcher at USC." However, he only appeared in four games as a freshman (making one start) and was 0–1 with a 13.50 ERA. Coulombe claimed that he was not healthy that season and it was affecting his mechanics.

Coulombe left USC and enrolled at South Mountain Community College. In the first inning of his first start he felt a pop in the back of his shoulder and left the game. Unable to regain his mechanics after the injury, the coaches shut him down for the rest of the season. He briefly considered giving up baseball but chose to enroll at Texas Tech University for his junior season. He was the Red Raiders opening day starter in 2011 and combined with two relievers on a two-hitter. He suffered a torn ulnar collateral ligament in his pitching elbow on March 11, costing him the rest of the season. Coulombe underwent Tommy John surgery and returned to action the following season, allowing three hits and one run in 5 1/3 innings in his return. He appeared in 10 games (only two starts) and was 1–0 with a 2.53 ERA.

== Professional career ==
=== Los Angeles Dodgers ===
Coulombe was then drafted again by the Dodgers, in the 25th round of the 2012 Major League Baseball draft, and signed on June 15, 2012. He played with the rookie–level Ogden Raptors and Single–A Great Lakes Loons in 2012 and spent all of 2013 with the High–A Rancho Cucamonga Quakes of the California League, where he was 4–2 with a 4.05 earned run average (ERA) in 54 appearances. In 2014, he began the season with the Quakes, where he was 3–0 with a 3.05 ERA in 31 games before a late season promotion to the Double–A Chattanooga Lookouts, where he was in 18 games with a 2.57 ERA.

On September 16, 2014, the Dodgers selected Coulombe to the 40-man roster and promoted him to the major leagues for the first time. He pitched one scoreless inning of relief against the Colorado Rockies that same day. He was in five games for the Dodgers in September, allowing two earned runs in 4 1/3 innings, while being used as a lefty specialist.

Coulombe was assigned to the Triple–A Oklahoma City Dodgers to start the 2015 season. He spent the bulk of the season in Triple–A, appearing in 38 games with a 3.27 ERA. He did play in five games in Los Angeles, allowing seven runs in 8 1/3 innings. On September 6, he was designated for assignment following the promotion of Chris Heisey.

=== Oakland Athletics ===
On September 10, 2015, Coulombe was traded to the Oakland Athletics in exchange for cash considerations. He allowed three runs in seven and two thirds innings in nine games. On November 15, Coulombe was designated for assignment by Oakland. He cleared waivers and was sent outright to the Triple–A Nashville Sounds.

On May 10, 2016, the A's selected Coulombe's contract adding him to the major league roster. He had posted a 1.08 ERA in 20 games for Nashville prior to his promotion. In 35 appearances for the team, he logged a 4.53 ERA with 54 strikeouts in 47 2/3 innings pitched. In 2017, Coulombe made a team–high 72 appearances, registering a 3.48 ERA with 39 strikeouts in 51 2/3 innings of work.

Coulombe regressed in 2018, logging a 4.56 ERA with 26 strikeouts in 23 2/3 innings pitched across 27 contests. On September 3, 2018, he was designated for assignment following the acquisition of Aaron Brooks. He cleared waivers and was outrighted to Triple–A Nashville on September 5. Coulombe declared free agency following the regular season on October 2.

=== New York Yankees ===
On December 18, 2018, Coulombe signed a minor league contract with the New York Yankees. He received a non-roster invitation to spring training. In 16 appearances for the Triple–A Scranton/Wilkes-Barre RailRiders, Coulombe registered a 5.16 ERA with 42 strikeouts in 22 2/3 innings pitched. He was released by the Yankees organization on July 1, 2019.

=== Milwaukee Brewers ===
On July 19, 2019, Coulombe signed a minor league deal with the Milwaukee Brewers organization. He made 14 appearances for the Triple–A San Antonio Missions, logging a 4.15 ERA with 18 strikeouts in 13.0 innings of work. On August 29, Coulombe exercised the opt–out clause in his contract and was released by Milwaukee.

=== New York Yankees (second stint) ===
On August 31, 2019, Coulombe signed a minor league contract to return to the New York Yankees organization. He elected free agency following the season on November 4.

=== Minnesota Twins ===
On January 26, 2020, Coulombe signed a minor league contract with the Minnesota Twins organization. He was not assigned to a minor league affiliate after the minor league season was cancelled as a result of the COVID-19 pandemic. On August 22, the Twins selected Coulombe to their major league roster. That day, Coulombe threw two shutout innings of relief against the Kansas City Royals in his first major league appearance since 2018. Coulombe was designated for assignment on August 28 following the promotion of Juan Minaya. He elected free agency on October 13.

On November 17, 2020, Coulombe re-signed with the Twins on a minor league contract. He was assigned to the Triple–A St. Paul Saints to begin the 2021 season. On June 25, 2021, Coulombe was selected to the active roster. In 29 games for Minnesota, he recorded a 3.67 ERA with 33 strikeouts in 34 1/3 innings of work. On November 30, Coulombe was non-tendered by the Twins, making him a free agent. On December 2, Coulombe re-signed with the Twins on a minor league contract.

On April 4, 2022, Coulombe had his contract selected by the Twins after making the Opening Day roster for the first time in his career. Coulombe made 10 appearances for Minnesota, registering a 1.46 ERA with 9 strikeouts in 12 1/3 innings pitched. He was placed on the injured list on May 28 with a left hip impingement, and was transferred to the 60-day injured list on July 25, On July 27, he underwent left hip labrum surgery, which was deemed to be season-ending. On October 20, Coulombe was removed from the 40-man roster and sent outright to the Triple–A St. Paul Saints; he would subsequently elect free agency.

Coulombe re-signed with the Twins a minor league deal on December 30, 2022.

=== Baltimore Orioles ===
On March 27, 2023, Coulombe was traded to the Baltimore Orioles in exchange for cash considerations. He earned his first career save on July 16 against the Miami Marlins, surrendering a run on two hits in 2/3 of an inning to seal the 5–4 victory. Coulombe enjoyed the strongest season of his career in 2023. Appearing in 61 games out of the bullpen, he posted a 5–3 record and 2.81 ERA with 58 strikeouts and 2 saves in 51 1/3 innings pitched.

On June 19, 2024, it was announced that Coulombe had undergone surgery to remove bone chips from his left elbow. He was activated from the injured list on September 20. Coulombe made 33 total appearances for Baltimore, compiling a 2.12 ERA with 32 strikeouts across 29 2/3 innings pitched. On November 4, the Orioles declined his option for the 2025 season, making him a free agent.

=== Minnesota Twins (second stint) ===
On February 4, 2025, Coulombe signed a one-year, $3 million contract with the Minnesota Twins. Coulombe made 40 appearances (one start) for Minnesota, registering a 1-0 record and 1.16 ERA with 31 strikeouts and two saves over 31 innings of work.

=== Texas Rangers ===
On July 31, 2025, the Twins traded Coulombe to the Texas Rangers in exchange for Garrett Horn.

=== Boston Red Sox ===
On March 12, 2026, Coulombe signed a one-year, $1 million contract with the Boston Red Sox. He made 29 appearances for the Red Sox, compiling an 0–2 record and 4.50 ERA with 10 strikeouts over 22 innings of work. Coulombe was designated for assignment by Boston on July 12. He cleared waivers and was released on July 18.

== Personal ==
Coulombe is the son of Paul and Kathryn Coulombe. He has two siblings, brother Matthew and sister Julia. Coulombe's grandfather, Bertrand Oscar Coulombe, served in the United States Army Air Forces during World War II. He was the flight engineer and top turret gunner for a B-17 Flying Fortress named Ye Olde Pub when it was nearly shot down on December 20, 1943. Bertrand Coulombe posthumously received the Silver Star for the events of that incident which have been recorded in a New York Times and best-selling book entitled A Higher Call by Adam Makos.
