= Jorge Alcalá =

Dominican baseball player (born 1995)

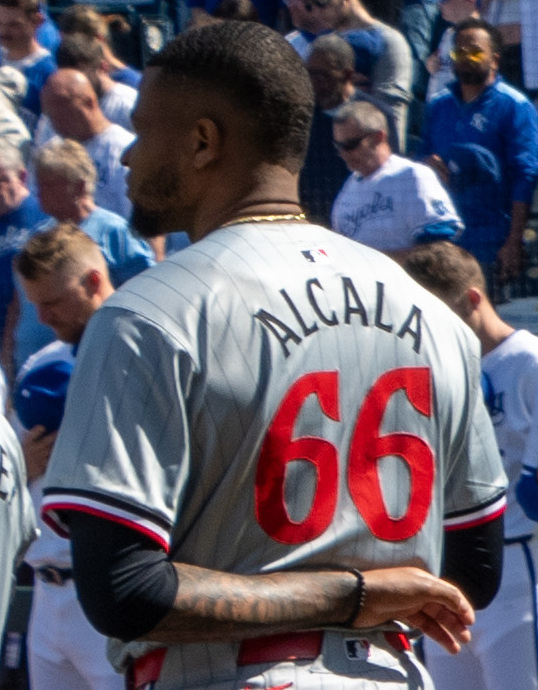
- Alcalá with the Minnesota Twins in 2024

Free agent
- Pitcher
- Born: July 28, 1995 (age 31); Bajos de Haina, Dominican Republic
- Bats: Right Throws: Right

MLB debut
- September 21, 2019, for the Minnesota Twins

MLB statistics (through 2025 season)
- Win–loss record: 9–13
- Earned run average: 4.29
- Strikeouts: 226
- Stats at Baseball Reference

Teams
- Minnesota Twins (2019–2025); Boston Red Sox (2025); St. Louis Cardinals (2025)

Jorge Luis Alcalá (born July 28, 1995) is a Dominican professional baseball pitcher who is a free agent. He has previously played in Major League Baseball (MLB) for the Minnesota Twins, Boston Red Sox, and St. Louis Cardinals.

== Career ==
=== Houston Astros ===
Alcalá signed with the Houston Astros as an international free agent on December 3, 2014. He made his professional debut in 2015 with the Dominican Summer League Astros, going 2–0 with a 3.06 ERA and 20 strikeouts across 32 1/3 innings pitched. Alcalá split the 2016 season between the rookie-level Gulf Coast League Astros, rookie-level Greeneville Astros, and Low-A Tri-City ValleyCats, pitching to a combined 3–3 record with a 2.41 ERA and 70 strikeouts in 15 games (ten starts) between the three affiliates.

Alcalá spent the 2017 campaign with the Single-A Quad Cities River Bandits and High-A Buies Creek Astros, compiling an aggregate 7–6 record and 3.05 ERA with 95 strikeouts over 22 appearances (18 starts). He started the 2018 season with Buies Creek before being promoted to the Double-A Corpus Christi Hooks.

=== Minnesota Twins ===
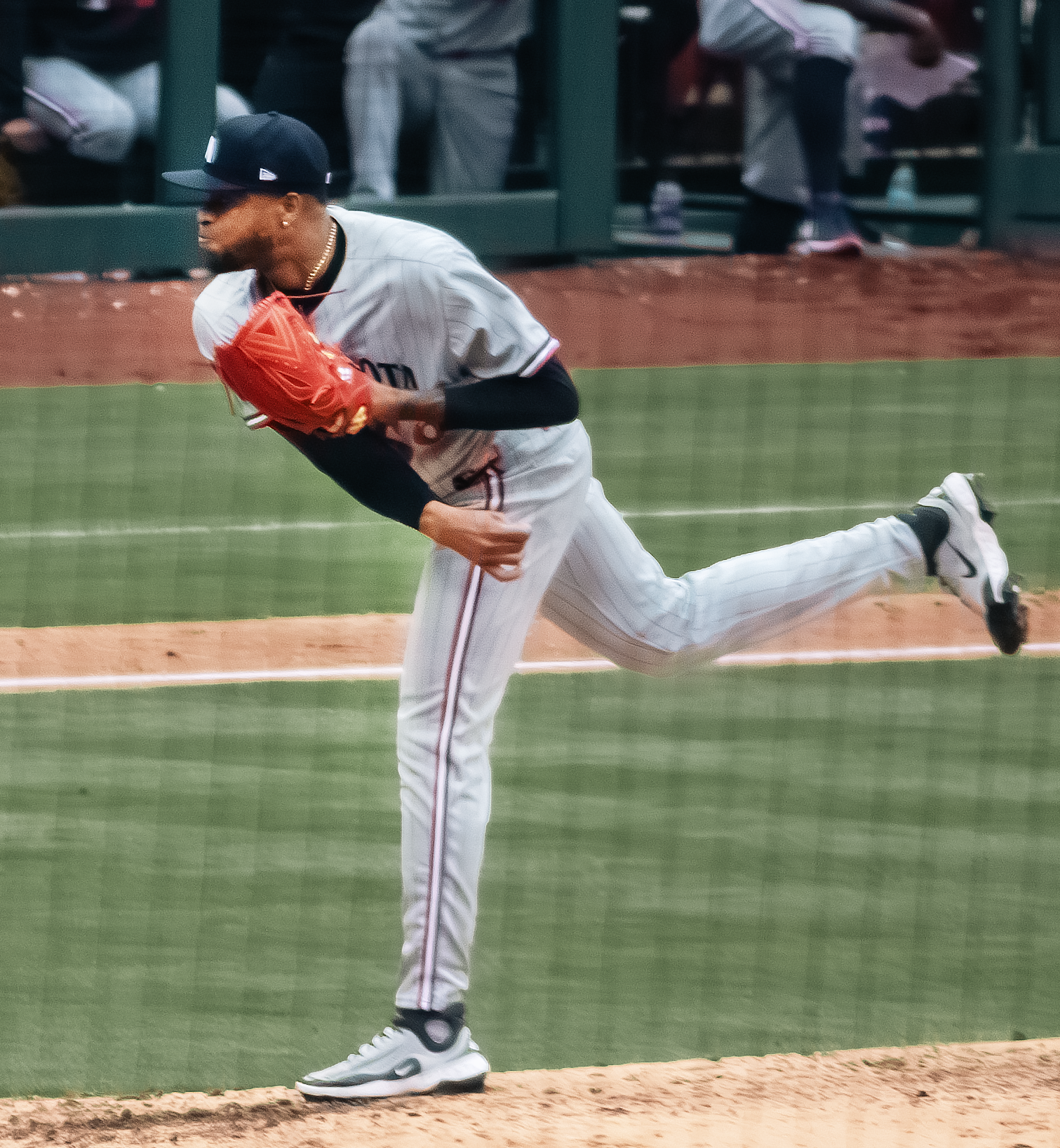
Jorge Alcalá with the Twins 2025.

On July 27, 2018, Alcalá and Gilberto Celestino were traded to the Minnesota Twins in exchange for Ryan Pressly. He was assigned to the Chattanooga Lookouts. In 24 games (16 starts) between Buies Creek, Corpus Christi, and Chattanooga, he pitched to a 3–11 record with a 3.81 ERA and a 1.34 WHIP. He split the 2019 minor league season between the Pensacola Blue Wahoos and the Rochester Red Wings, combining to go 6–7 with a 5.47 ERA over 109 innings.

On September 14, 2019, the Twins selected Alcalá's contract and promoted him to the major leagues. He made his major league debut on September 21 versus the Kansas City Royals, pitching 2/3 of an inning.

With the 2020 Minnesota Twins, Alcalá appeared in 16 games, compiling a 2–1 record with 2.63 ERA and 27 strikeouts in 24 innings pitched.

In 2021, Alcalá appeared in 59 games for the Twins. He ended the year with a 3–6 record, a 3.92 ERA, and 61 strikeouts across 59 2/3 innings. On October 3, 2021, game 162 of the season, Alcala notched his first MLB save with 1 1/3 dominant innings, closing out a 7-3 Twins victory over the Royals. Alcala went 1 1/3 innings, allowing no hits, no walks, and striking out three.

Alcalá only appeared in two games during the 2022 season. Unfortunately, elbow inflammation essentially wiped out his entire season, as he was placed on the injured list five games into the year, before being shut down for the season in August. He pitched 2 1/3 innings, striking out two while walking two other batters.

On January 13, 2023, Alcalá agreed to a one-year, $790K contract with the Twins, avoiding salary arbitration. On May 16, Alcalá was placed on the injured list with a forearm injury; after undergoing an MRI, he was diagnosed with a radial stress fracture in his right forearm. He was transferred to the 60–day injured list on June 18. On September 10, Alcalá began a rehab assignment with the Low–A Fort Myers Miracle, and was activated from the injured list on October 1.

Alcalá made 54 appearances for the Twins during the 2024 campaign, compiling a 4–3 record and 3.24 ERA with 58 strikeouts across 58 1/3 innings pitched. In 2025, Alcalá made 22 appearances for Minnesota, logging a 0–2 record, an 8.88 ERA, and 28 strikeouts across 24 1/3 innings pitched.

=== Boston Red Sox ===
On June 11, 2025, Alcalá was traded to the Boston Red Sox in exchange for minor league prospect Andy Lugo. Alcalá regained some confidence early on with Boston, only giving up two earned runs with the team through July 28 in 16 games. However, after returning to play his former team, the Minnesota Twins, Alcala fluttered, giving up three home runs and five runs in three games thereafter. On August 5, Alcalá was designated for assignment by the Red Sox. In 19 appearances for Boston, he recorded a 3.31 ERA with 18 strikeouts across 16 1/3 innings pitched.

=== St. Louis Cardinals ===
On August 7, 2025, Alcalá was claimed off waivers by the St. Louis Cardinals. He made 15 appearances for St. Louis, recording a 5.02 ERA with 15 strikeouts across 14 1/3 innings pitched. Alcalá was designated for assignment by the Cardinals on November 18. On November 21, he was non-tendered and became a free agent.

=== Toronto Blue Jays ===
On December 18, 2025, Alcalá signed a minor league contract with the Toronto Blue Jays. He made 12 appearances split between the Single–A Dunedin Blue Jays and Triple–A Buffalo Bisons, accumulating an 0–1 record and 5.40 ERA with 17 strikeouts over 15 innings of work. Alcalá was released by the Blue Jays organization on August 4, 2026.
