= José Berríos =

Puerto Rican baseball player (born 1994)

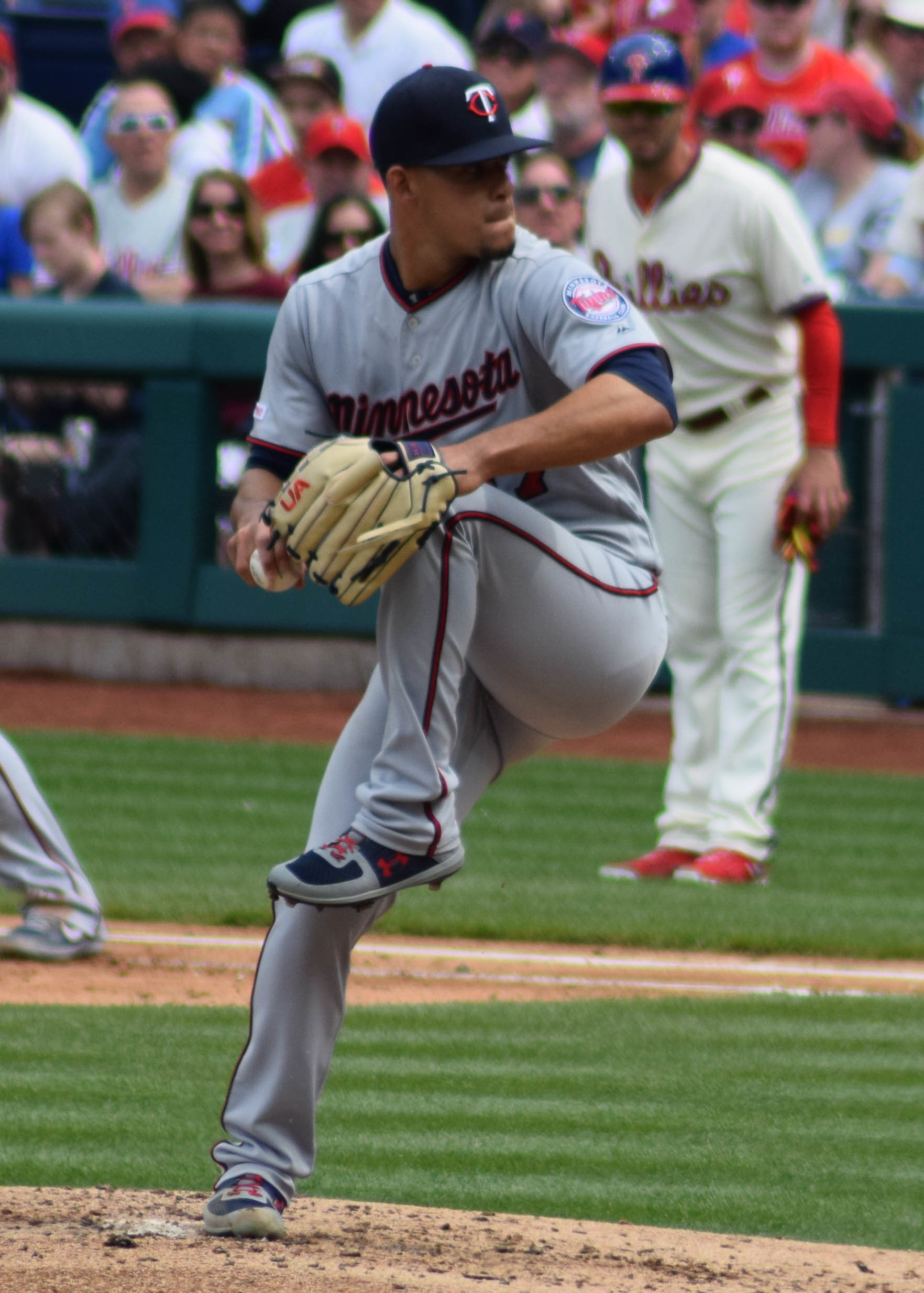
- Berríos with the Minnesota Twins in 2019

Toronto Blue Jays – No. 17
- Pitcher
- Born: May 27, 1994 (age 32); Bayamón, Puerto Rico
- Bats: Right Throws: Right

MLB debut
- April 27, 2016, for the Minnesota Twins

MLB statistics (through 2025 season)
- Win–loss record: 108–82
- Earned run average: 4.08
- Strikeouts: 1,481
- Stats at Baseball Reference

Teams
- Minnesota Twins (2016–2021); Toronto Blue Jays (2021–2025)

Career highlights and awards
- 2× All-Star (2018, 2019); Gold Glove Award (2023)
Medals
Men's baseball
Representing Puerto Rico
World Baseball Classic
Silver medal – second place	2013 San Francisco	Team
Silver medal – second place	2017 Los Angeles	Team

José Orlando Berríos (born May 27, 1994), nicknamed "La Makina" (Spanish for "the Machine"), is a Puerto Rican professional baseball pitcher for the Toronto Blue Jays of Major League Baseball (MLB). He previously played for the Minnesota Twins, who selected him in the first round of the 2012 Major League Baseball draft.

== Professional career ==
=== Minor Leagues (2012–2016) ===
The Minnesota Twins selected Berríos in the first round of the 2012 Major League Baseball draft with the 32nd pick. He made his professional debut that season for the Gulf Coast Twins of the Rookie-level Gulf Coast League and was promoted to the Elizabethton Twins of the Rookie-level Appalachian League in August. In 30 2/3 innings pitched between both teams, he was 3–0 with a 1.17 ERA, striking out 49.

During the 2013 season, Berríos played for the Cedar Rapids Kernels of the Single-A Midwest League where he was 7–7 with a 3.99 ERA in 19 starts. Berríos started 2014 with the Fort Myers Miracle of the High-A Florida State League. He was selected to play in the All-Star Futures Game in July. After going 9–3 with a 1.96 ERA in 16 starts, Berríos was promoted to the New Britain Rock Cats of the Double-A Eastern League on July 7. In eight starts for New Britain, he pitched to a 3–4 record and 3.54 ERA. He also played in one game for the Rochester Red Wings of the Triple-A International League at the end of the season.

Berríos began the 2015 season with the Chattanooga Lookouts of the Double-A Southern League and received another midseason promotion to Rochester. In 27 combined starts between the two affiliates, he posted a 14–5 record and a 2.87 ERA. He started the 2016 season with Rochester.

=== Minnesota Twins (2016–2021) ===
==== 2016 ====
The Twins promoted Berríos to make his major league debut on April 27, 2016. In 18 innings pitched for Rochester prior to his promotion, he was 2–0 with a 1.06 ERA and 20 strikeouts. He was recalled and optioned multiple times during the season. In 14 starts for Minnesota, he was 3–7 with an 8.02 ERA, and in 17 starts for Rochester, he was 10–5 with a 2.51 ERA.

==== 2017 ====
Berríos began 2017 with Rochester. After going 3–0 with a 1.13 ERA in six starts there, he was promoted to the Twins on May 13, where he spent the remainder of the season. In 26 games (25 starts) with Minnesota, he was 14–8 with a 3.89 ERA.

==== 2018: All-Star season ====
Berríos began 2018 in Minnesota's starting rotation and made his first start of the 2018 season on April 1, 2018. He pitched a complete game three-hit shutout (the first of his career) against the Baltimore Orioles, with 6 strikeouts, leading the Twins to a 7–0 win. Berrios tied his career high 11 strikeouts on April 12, 2018, in a 4–0 win over the Chicago White Sox. On April 18, 2018, Berríos finished with five strikeouts and no walks in seven scoreless innings for Minnesota in a game played in his native Puerto Rico before a sold-out crowd at the Hiram Bithorn Stadium. Berrios became only the second Puerto Rican pitcher to start a regular-season MLB game at Hiram Bithorn; the first being Javier Vazquez, who made four starts there in 2003 with the Montreal Expos. His second career complete game came on June 7 against the Chicago White Sox, he became the 9th Twins pitcher to pitch a complete game and strikeout at least 10 batters without allowing a walk.

Owning an 8–7 record with a 3.54 ERA over 18 starts, Berríos was named to the 2018 MLB All-Star Game. He was the only representative selected from the Twins to participate in the All-Star Game. In the All-Star Game, Berríos pitched one scoreless 5th inning, earning a hold in the game. Berríos finished the season with 12–11 record with a 3.84 ERA and 202 strikeouts over 32 starts, leading the league in complete games and complete game shutouts.

==== 2019: Second All-Star season ====
On March 5, 2019, it was reported that Berrios would start opening day against the Cleveland Indians. He went 7 2/3 innings and had 10 strikeouts while not allowing a run. He received the win and the Minnesota Twins won 2–0.

On July 3, 2019, it was announced that Berríos would participate in the 2019 MLB All-Star Game. He finished the season with a 14–8 record with 3.68 ERA and 195 strikeouts in 200 1/3 innings pitched.

==== 2020 ====
With the 2020 Minnesota Twins, Berríos appeared in 12 games, compiling a 5–4 record with a 4.00 ERA and 68 strikeouts in 63 innings pitched during the shortened season due to the COVID-19 pandemic.

==== 2021 ====
With the 2021 Minnesota Twins, Berríos appeared in 20 games, compiling a 7–5 with a 3.48 ERA and 126 strikeouts in 121 2/3 innings pitched.

=== Toronto Blue Jays ===
On July 30, 2021, Berríos was traded to the Toronto Blue Jays in exchange for Austin Martin and Simeon Woods Richardson. Berríos appeared in 12 games for Toronto, compiling a 5–4 with 3.58 ERA and 78 strikeouts in 70 1/3 innings pitched. On November 16, Berríos agreed to a seven-year, $131 million contract extension with the Blue Jays. The deal was made official on November 18.

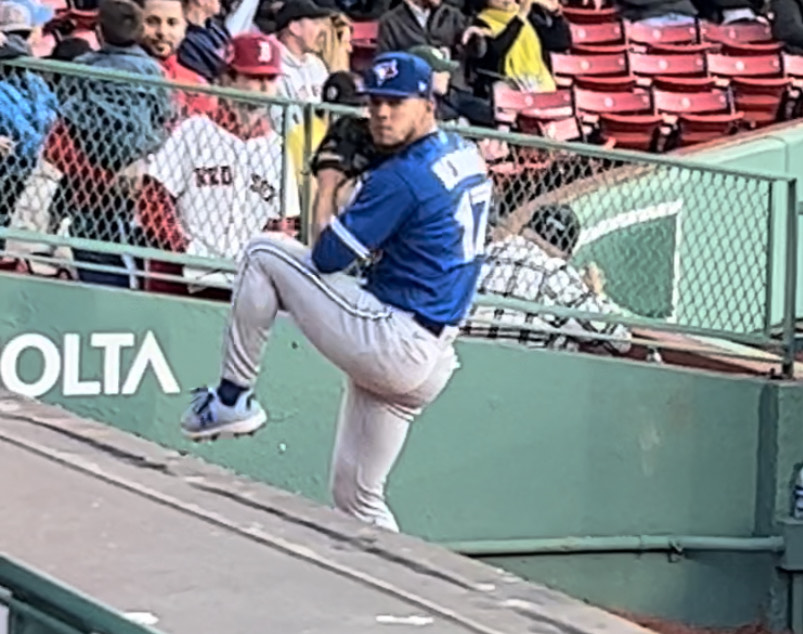
Berrios with the Blue Jays in 2023

In 2022, Berríos compiled a 12–7 record with a 5.23 ERA, as hitters batted .288 against him with a .804 OPS, the highest average and OPS in MLB against any qualified pitcher.

On April 3, 2023, Berríos made his season debut against the Kansas City Royals, pitching 5 2/3 innings and allowing nine hits and eight earned runs. He had a 10–0 record in his first thirteen career starts against the Baltimore Orioles until a 5–3 loss at Camden Yards on August 24. Berríos ended the season with an 11-12 record and 3.65 ERA with 184 strikeouts in 189 2/3 innings pitched.

With the Blue Jays in 2024, Berríos appeared in 32 games, compiling a 16–11 with 3.60 ERA and 153 strikeouts in 192 1/3 innings pitched.

On March 27, 2025, Berríos started his 2025 season as the Opening Day starter against the Baltimore Orioles. He had a rough outing, where he pitched five innings, allowed nine hits and six runs. On April 7, Berríos logged his 100th career win as a pitcher as he pitched seven innings, allowed four hits and one run while walking three batters and striking out two batters against the Boston Red Sox. He became the fifth Puerto Rican-born pitcher to win 100 MLB games.

On March 13, 2026, Berríos was scratched from joining the Puerto Rico national team for the 2026 World Baseball Classic after being flagged with right elbow inflammation in his tournament physical. On March 18, manager John Schneider announced that Berríos had been diagnosed with a stress fracture in the elbow and would not be ready for Opening Day. On May 20, Berríos underwent Tommy John surgery, ending his season.

== International career ==
=== World Baseball Classic ===
Berríos has played for the Puerto Rican national team twice, in the 2013 World Baseball Classic and in the 2017 World Baseball Classic, winning in both tournaments the silver medal. In October 2022, it was announced that Berrios intended to represent Puerto Rico in the World Baseball Classic for a third time in 2023.

== Personal life ==
Berríos is married to Jannieliz Márquez. They have two sons and one daughter. Berríos' wife Jannieliz is the sister of Irmarie Márquez, who is married to Javier Báez, an infielder for the Detroit Tigers.

=== Philanthropy ===
During the offseason, Berríos went to his hometown of Bayamón and delivered water, food, and other supplies to people in need as a consequence of Hurricane Maria which caused massive damage to Puerto Rico in September 2017.

== See also ==
- List of Major League Baseball players from Puerto Rico
- List of baseball players who underwent Tommy John surgery
