= Luke Farrell (baseball) =

American baseball player (born 1991)

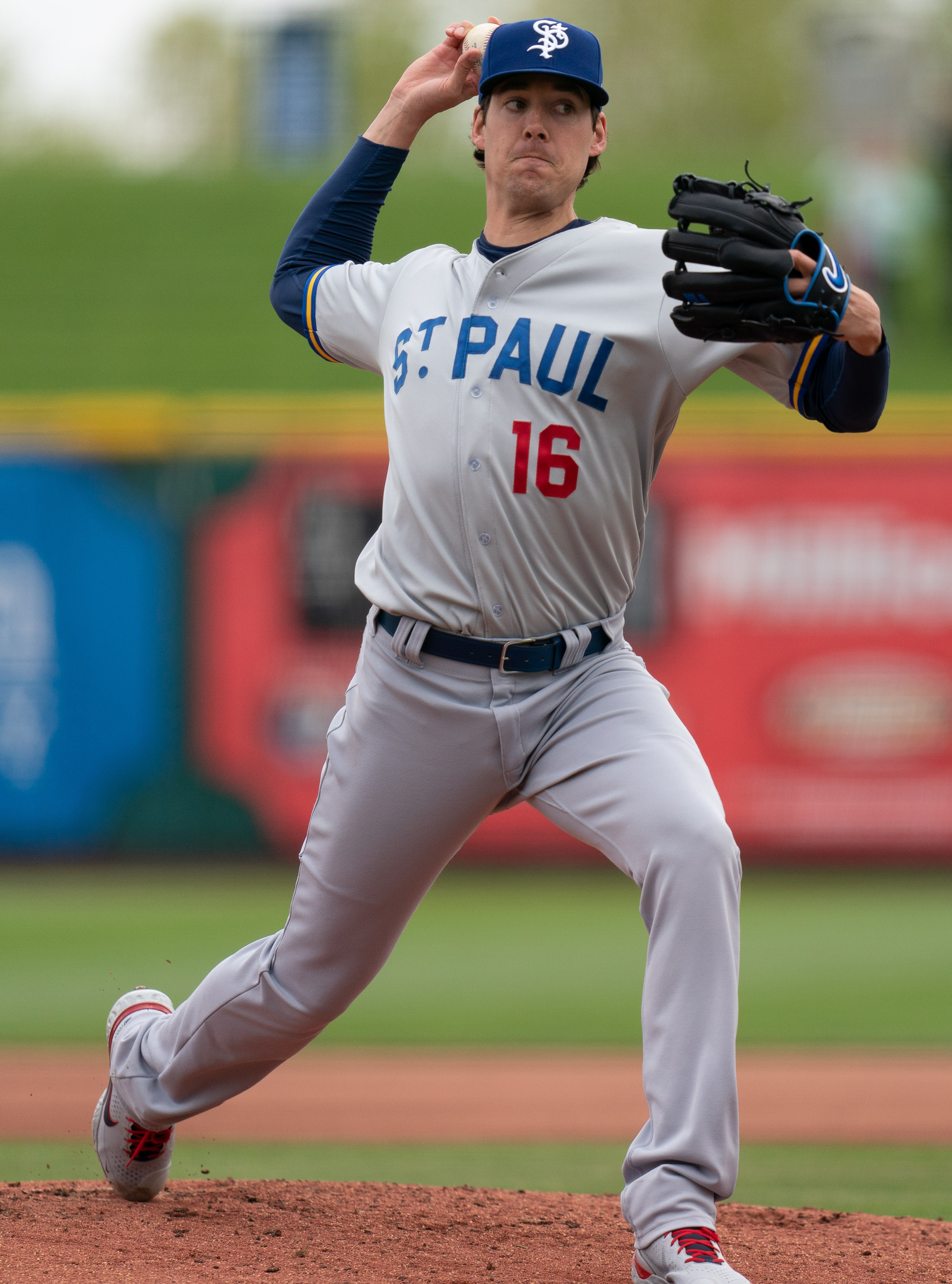
- Farrell with the St. Paul Saints in 2021
- Pitcher
- Born: June 7, 1991 (age 35); Westlake, Ohio, U.S.
- Batted: Left Threw: Right

MLB debut
- July 1, 2017, for the Kansas City Royals

Last MLB appearance
- September 14, 2022, for the Cincinnati Reds

MLB statistics
- Win–loss record: 5–5
- Earned run average: 5.00
- Strikeouts: 107
- Stats at Baseball Reference

Teams
- Kansas City Royals (2017); Cincinnati Reds (2017); Chicago Cubs (2018); Texas Rangers (2019–2020); Minnesota Twins (2021); Chicago Cubs (2022); Cincinnati Reds (2022)

Luke Thomas Farrell (born June 7, 1991) is an American former professional baseball pitcher. He played in Major League Baseball (MLB) for the Kansas City Royals, Chicago Cubs, Texas Rangers, Minnesota Twins, and Cincinnati Reds. He made his MLB debut in 2017.

== Career ==
=== Amateur ===
Farrell attended Saint Ignatius High School in Cleveland, Ohio, and Northwestern University, where he played college baseball for the Northwestern Wildcats. In 2010, his freshman year, he was diagnosed with a schwannoma, a benign nerve sheath tumor on his jaw, that required surgical removal. He developed another tumor that was removed and treated with radiation therapy in 2011. In his four years at Northwestern, Farrell had 208 strikeouts, and was awarded with the Big Ten Medal of Honor in his senior season. In 2011, he played collegiate summer baseball with the Wareham Gatemen of the Cape Cod Baseball League, and returned to the league in 2012 to play for the Falmouth Commodores.

=== Kansas City Royals ===
The Kansas City Royals selected Farrell in the sixth round of the 2013 MLB draft. Farrell made 10 starts with the Rookie Advanced level Idaho Falls Chukars, where he went 1–3 with a 6.65 ERA, although he did strike out 45 batters in 43 1/3 innings. Farrell's struggles continued in 2014 with the Single-A Lexington Legends, going 2–12 in 19 starts with a 5.25 ERA while striking out 8.5 batters per 9 innings. Farrell opened the 2015 season with the High-A Wilmington Blue Rocks, then was promoted to the Double-A Northwest Arkansas Naturals in May. Farrell made 16 starts at Double-A, going 5–3 with a 3.09 ERA, although his strikeouts per 9 innings pitched dropped to 6.3. Farrell pitched 2016 with the Triple-A Omaha Storm Chasers, where in 19 appearances (14 starts), he went 6–3 with a 3.76 ERA. He returned to Omaha to begin the 2017 season, where he made 13 starts before earning a promotion to the major leagues on July 1.

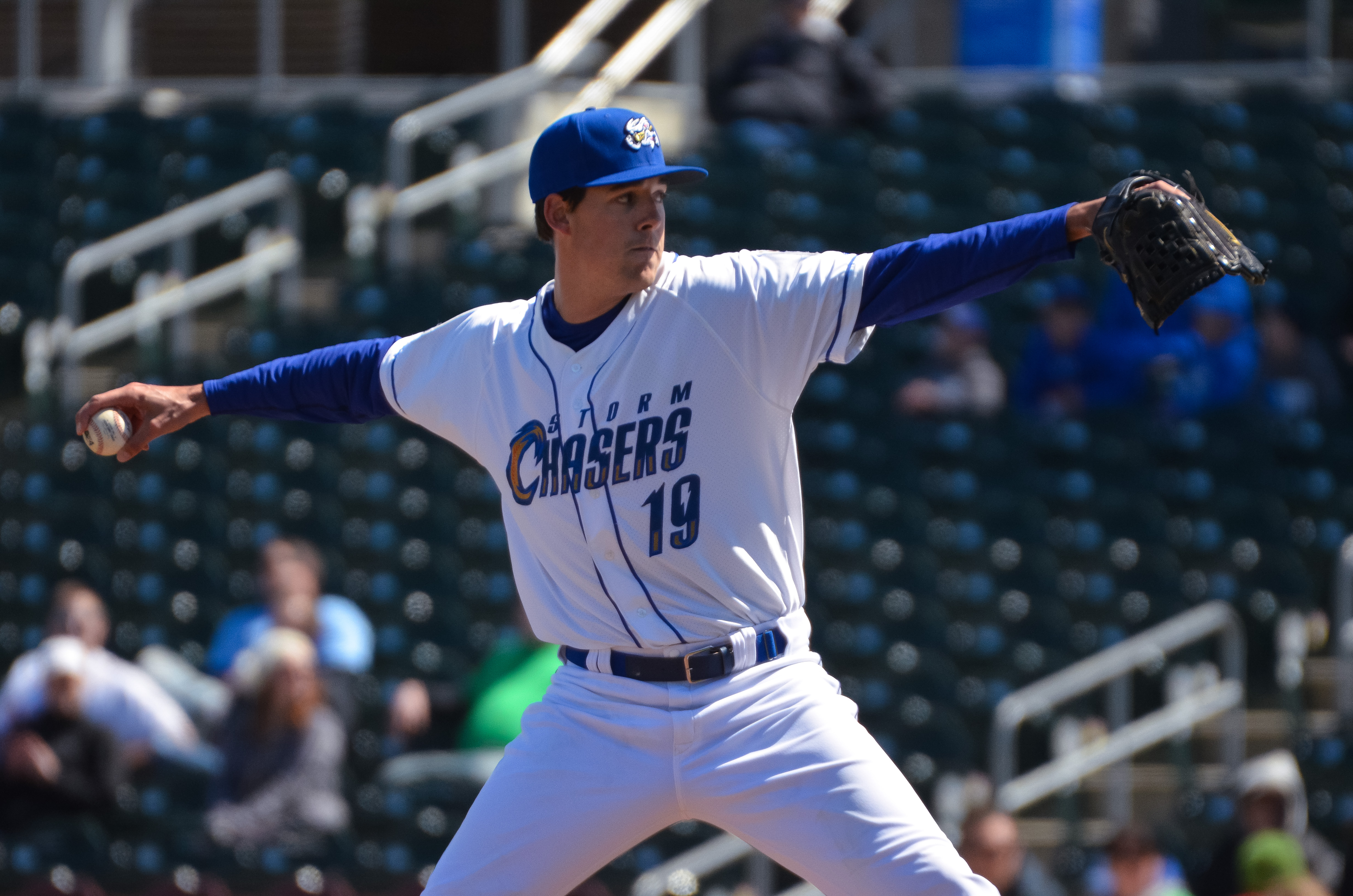
Farrell with the Omaha Storm Chasers in 2016

When the Royals needed a starting pitcher for the first game of a doubleheader against the Minnesota Twins, Farrell was called up from Omaha to make his major league debut. He gave up 5 runs in 2 2/3 innings and left the game as the pitcher of record, but did not receive a loss as Kansas City came back to win the game. Originally recalled as the 26th player for the doubleheader, Farrell was optioned back to Omaha the next day. Following the Royals' acquisition of three major league pitchers from the San Diego Padres, Farrell was designated for assignment on July 24.

=== Los Angeles Dodgers ===
Farrell was traded to the Los Angeles Dodgers in exchange for cash considerations on July 28, 2017, and was assigned to the Triple-A Oklahoma City Dodgers. Farrell made one appearance for Oklahoma City, giving up 2 earned runs in 4 2/3 innings.

=== Cincinnati Reds ===
On August 9, 2017, Farrell was claimed off waivers by the Cincinnati Reds, and assigned to the Triple-A Louisville Bats. He was called up by the Reds on August 23, when he made his National League debut and pitched 3 innings of scoreless relief.

=== Chicago Cubs ===
Farrell was claimed off waivers by the Chicago Cubs on October 4, 2017. He pitched five shutout innings on June 2, 2018, against the New York Mets. On June 24, 2018, Farrell was assigned to the Triple-A Iowa Cubs. He was designated for assignment on September 1, 2018. He finished 3–4 in 20 games (2 starts). He struck out 39 batters in 31 1/3 innings.

=== Los Angeles Angels ===
Farrell was claimed off waivers by the Los Angeles Angels on September 3, 2018. On December 21, Farrell was designated for assignment by the Angels.

=== Texas Rangers ===
On January 4, 2019, Farrell was claimed off waivers by the Texas Rangers. On March 2, he was struck in the face by a line drive during a spring training game and suffered a broken jaw and a concussion. Farrell underwent surgery on March 6 to insert a plate and screws on the jaw bone. His jaw was wired shut and he was placed on a liquid diet for one month. Farrell lost 15–20 pounds during the recovery process. He was placed on the 60–day injured list to open the season. Farrell rehabbed with the rookie–level Arizona League Rangers and Double–A Frisco RoughRiders before being activated on August 23. In 9 games for Texas in 2019, he went 1–0 with a 2.70 ERA and 12 strikeouts over 13 1/3 innings. Farrell pitched in 4 games for Texas in 2020, allowing 5 earned runs in 5 1/3 innings pitched. On October 30, 2020, Farrell was removed from the 40-man roster and sent outright to the Triple–A Round Rock Express. He became a free agent on November 2.

=== Minnesota Twins ===
On December 17, 2020, Farrell signed a minor league contract with the Minnesota Twins organization. On April 20, 2021, Farrell was selected to the active roster. On April 24, Farrell was removed from the roster after throwing one shutout inning with one strikeout. On May 19, Farrell was again selected to the active roster. Farrell made 20 appearances for the Twins, going 1–1 with a 4.74 ERA and 25 strikeouts. Farrell was outrighted off of the 40-man roster on October 8. On October 14, Farrell elected free agency.

=== Chicago Cubs (second stint) ===
On April 18, 2022, Farrell signed a minor league contract with the Chicago Cubs. He was called up from the Triple-A Iowa Cubs on August 24. On September 6, Farrell was designated for assignment.

=== Cincinnati Reds (second stint) ===
On September 9, 2022, Farrell was claimed off waivers by the Cincinnati Reds. In two games for the Reds, Farrell struggled to a 9.00 ERA with 5 strikeouts and 4 walks in 4.0 innings pitched. He was designated for assignment by Cincinnati on September 15. Farrell cleared waivers and was sent outright to the Triple–A Louisville Bats on September 17. He made one appearance for the Louisville to close out the year. Farrell elected free agency following the season on October 6.

=== Chicago White Sox ===
On April 17, 2023, Farrell signed a minor league contract with the Chicago White Sox organization. In 37 games (7 starts) for the Triple–A Charlotte Knights, he registered a 5.56 ERA with 52 strikeouts across 55.0 innings of work. Farrell elected free agency following the season on November 6.

=== Washington Nationals ===
On February 6, 2024, Farrell signed a minor league contract with the Washington Nationals. In 9 appearances split between the rookie–level Florida Complex League Nationals and High–A Wilmington Blue Rocks, he accumulated a 2.93 ERA with 11 strikeouts over 15 1/3 innings pitched. Farrell was released by the Nationals organization on July 7.

=== Algodoneros de Unión Laguna ===
On July 22, 2024, Farrell signed with the Algodoneros de Unión Laguna of the Mexican League. He made 2 appearances (1 start) for the Algodoneros, posting a 1.42 ERA with 3 strikeouts over 6 1/3 innings pitched. Farrell announced his retirement from professional baseball on September 27.

== Personal life ==
Luke Farrell is the youngest of three sons born to former Boston Red Sox manager John Farrell. John Farrell took a one-day leave from the Red Sox to be at Kauffman Stadium on July 1, 2017, to watch Luke make his MLB debut; the Red Sox were managed that day by bench coach Gary DiSarcina. On September 23, 2017, Luke pitched a scoreless inning of relief against the Red Sox, which was the first time in MLB history that a son pitched against a team managed by his father. Luke's brothers, Jeremy and Shane, were both selected in the MLB draft, with Jeremy playing in the minor leagues from 2008 through 2015.

== See also ==
- List of second-generation Major League Baseball players
