= Charlie Barnes (baseball) =

American baseball player (born 1995)

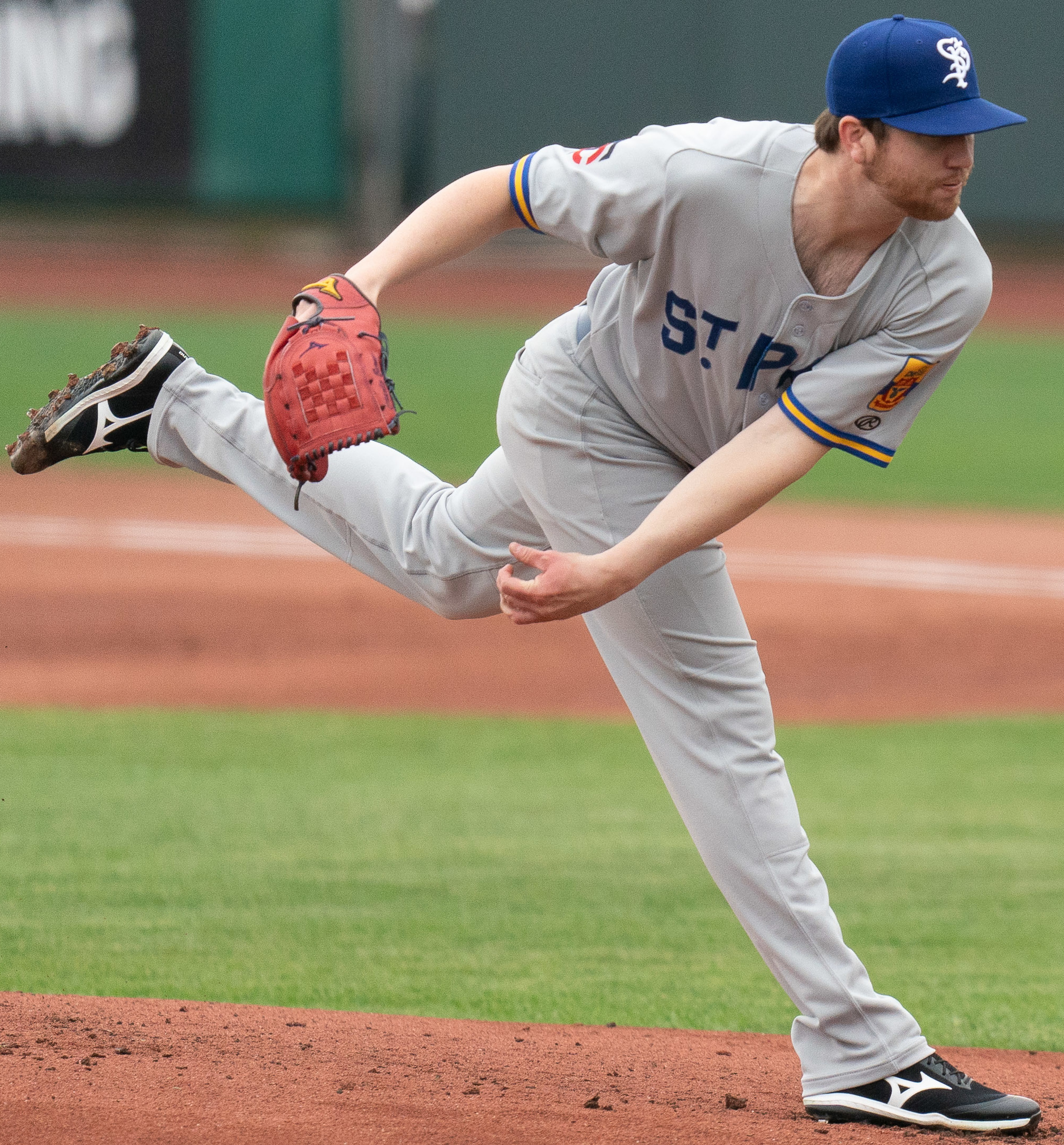
- Barnes with the St. Paul Saints in 2021

Free agent
- Pitcher
- Born: October 1, 1995 (age 31); Sumter, South Carolina, U.S.
- Bats: Left Throws: Left

Professional debut
- MLB: July 17, 2021, for the Minnesota Twins
- KBO: April 2, 2022, for the Lotte Giants

MLB statistics (through 2026 season)
- Win–loss record: 0–4
- Earned run average: 6.18
- Strikeouts: 26

KBO statistics (through 2025 season)
- Win–loss record: 35–32
- Earned run average: 3.58
- Strikeouts: 516
- Stats at Baseball Reference

Teams
- Minnesota Twins (2021); Lotte Giants (2022–2025); Chicago Cubs (2026); Los Angeles Dodgers (2026)

Charles Segars Barnes (born October 1, 1995) is an American professional baseball pitcher who is a free agent. He has previously played in MLB for the Minnesota Twins, Chicago Cubs, and Los Angeles Dodgers, and in the KBO League for the Lotte Giants. He was drafted by the Twins in the fourth round of the 2017 MLB draft and made his MLB debut in 2021. Listed at 6 feet 2 inches (1.88 m) and 190 pounds (86 kg), he throws and bats left-handed.

== Amateur career ==
A native of Sumter, South Carolina, Barnes attended Sumter High School. He went on to play college baseball at Clemson University, and in 2016, he played collegiate summer baseball with the Hyannis Harbor Hawks of the Cape Cod Baseball League. Barnes was drafted by the Minnesota Twins in the fourth round, 106th overall, of the 2017 Major League Baseball draft.

== Professional career ==
=== Minnesota Twins ===
Barnes made his professional debut with the rookie-level Elizabethton Twins, and also played for the Single-A Cedar Rapids Kernels that year, posting a cumulative 4–2 record and 2.61 ERA. In 2018, he played for the High-A Fort Myers Miracle, recording a 6–6 record and 2.81 ERA in 23 appearances. Barnes split the 2019 season between Fort Myers, the Double-A Pensacola Blue Wahoos, and the Triple-A Rochester Red Wings, pitching to a 7–8 record and 4.88 ERA with 124 strikeouts in 131 innings of work.

Barnes did not play in a game in 2020 due to the cancellation of the minor league season because of the COVID-19 pandemic. Barnes was assigned to the Triple-A St. Paul Saints to begin the 2021 season, and logged a 5–2 record and 3.88 ERA in 11 games.

On July 17, 2021, Barnes was selected to the 40-man roster and promoted to the major leagues for the first time. He made his MLB debut that day as the starting pitcher against the Detroit Tigers, and took the loss after allowing the game's only run, a solo home run off the bat of Tigers outfielder Robbie Grossman to lead off the bottom of the first. His first MLB strikeout was of Zack Short in the second inning. Barnes appeared in nine games for the Twins, posting a 5.92 ERA and 20 strikeouts. On November 19, he was designated for assignment by the Twins and outrighted to Triple-A on November 24. However, he was released on December 31 and became a free agent.

=== Lotte Giants ===
On December 23, 2021, Barnes signed with the Lotte Giants of the KBO League. In 2022, he made 31 starts for the Giants, logging a 12–12 record and 3.62 ERA with 160 strikeouts across 186 1/3 innings of work. He re-signed a one-year deal for the 2023 season and started 30 games for Lotte, posting an 11–10 record and 3.28 ERA with 147 strikeouts across 170 1/3 innings pitched.

On December 17, 2023, Barnes again re–signed with the Giants on a one–year, $1.2 million contract. He made 25 starts for Lotte in 2024, posting a 9–6 record and 3.35 ERA with 171 strikeouts over 150 2/3 innings of work. Barnes re–signed with the Giants again on December 12, 2024, for $1.5 million. In eight starts for the team, he compiled a 3-4 record and 5.32 ERA with 38 strikeouts across 45 2/3 innings pitched. Barnes was released by the Lotte on May 14, 2025.

=== Cincinnati Reds ===
On August 5, 2025, Barnes signed a minor league contract with the Cincinnati Reds. He made six starts for the Triple-A Louisville Bats, but struggled to a 1-3 record and 7.13 ERA with 27 strikeouts over 24 innings of work. Barnes elected free agency following the season on November 6.

=== Chicago Cubs ===
On January 26, 2026, Barnes signed a minor league contract with the Chicago Cubs. He was assigned to the Triple-A Iowa Cubs to begin the year, for whom he logged a 3-0 record and 2.38 ERA with 14 strikeouts over three appearances. On April 12, the Cubs selected Barnes' contract, adding him to their active roster. He pitched three innings in one game, on April 13, against the Philadelphia Phillies, allowing four runs on four hits and three walks. Barnes was designated for assignment by the Cubs following the promotion of Trent Thornton on May 6.

=== Los Angeles Dodgers ===
On May 9, 2026, Barnes was claimed off waivers by the Los Angeles Dodgers. He was initially assigned to the Triple-A Oklahoma City Comets but was called up by the Dodgers on May 15 before he got into any minor league games. Barnes was designated for assignment by Los Angeles on July 11. He cleared waivers and elected free agency on July 15 rather than accept an outright assignment Oklahoma City. On July 17, Barnes re-signed with the Dodgers on a minor league contract. On July 21, Los Angeles added Barnes back to their active roster. He pitched in one game during his second stint with the team, pitching a scoreless inning before he was again designated for assignment on July 29, and once more chose to become a free agent. Barnes again returned to the team on a new minor league contract on August 2. On August 10, he was added back to the Dodgers' active roster only to be designated for assignment again on August 13. He again elected free agency but quickly re-signed with the Dodgers on a new minor league contract on August 16.

Overall, Barnes has pitched in four games for the Dodgers, allowing seven runs over ten innings; in 56 innings for the Comets, he recorded a 3.70 ERA with 53 strikeouts. He elected free agency on November 2.
