= Beau Burrows =

American baseball player (born 1996)

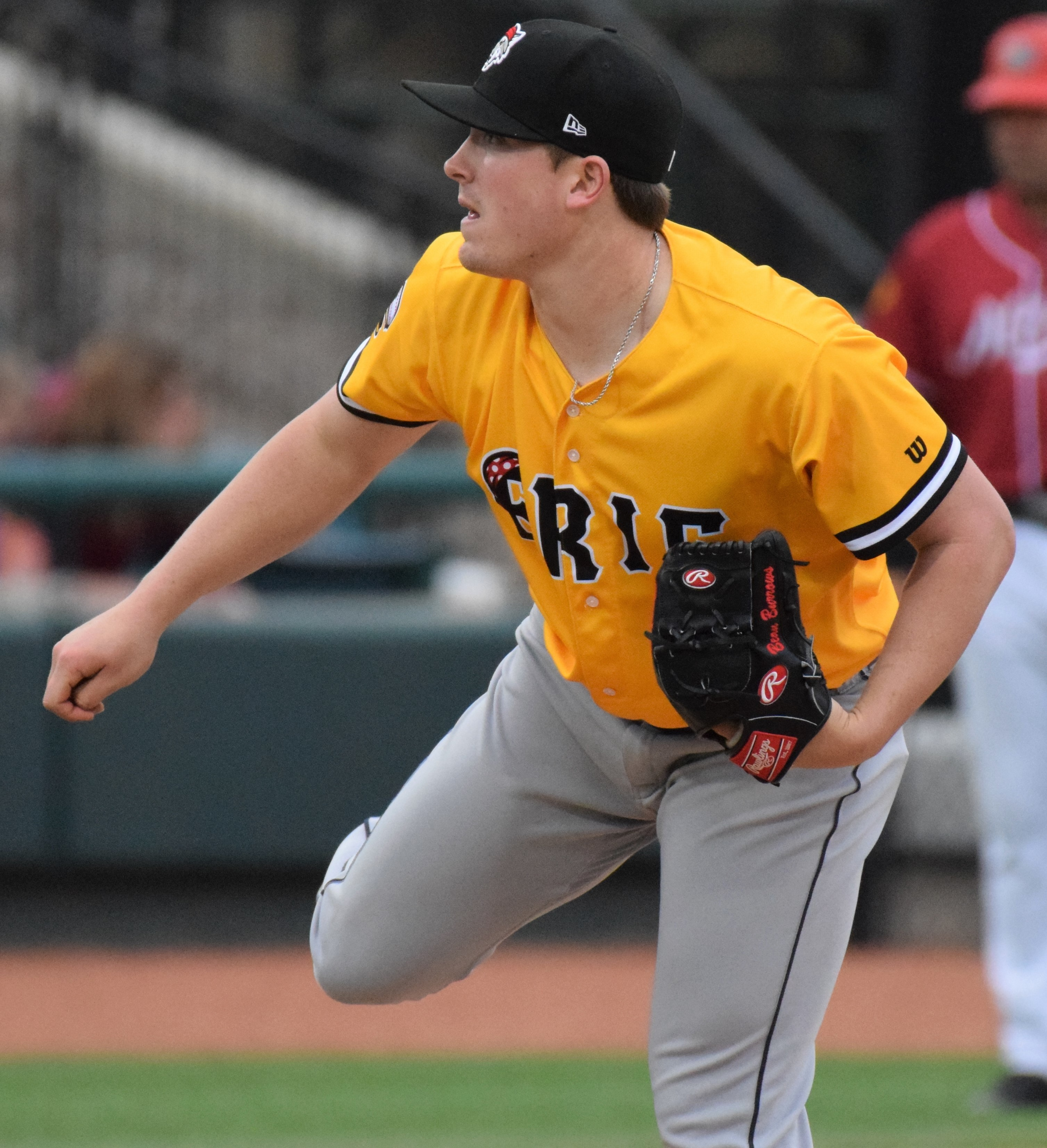
- Burrows with the Erie SeaWolves in 2018

Free agent
- Pitcher
- Born: September 18, 1996 (age 30); Fort Worth, Texas, U.S.
- Bats: Right Throws: Right

MLB debut
- July 27, 2020, for the Detroit Tigers

MLB statistics (through 2021 season)
- Win–loss record: 0–1
- Earned run average: 10.70
- Strikeouts: 11
- Stats at Baseball Reference

Teams
- Detroit Tigers (2020–2021); Minnesota Twins (2021)

Beau Van Burrows (born September 18, 1996) is an American professional baseball pitcher who is a free agent. He has previously played in Major League Baseball (MLB) for the Detroit Tigers and Minnesota Twins.

== Amateur career ==
Burrows attended Weatherford High School in Weatherford, Texas. In 2015, as a senior, he had a 9–3 win–loss record with a 0.89 earned run average (ERA), striking out 132 in 71 innings pitched.

== Professional career ==
=== Detroit Tigers ===
The Detroit Tigers selected Burrows in the first round, with the 22nd overall selection, of the 2015 MLB draft. He signed with the Tigers, forgoing his commitment to play college baseball at Texas A&M University.

Burrows made his professional debut in 2015 with the GCL Tigers and spent the whole season there, posting a 1–0 record with a 1.61 ERA in ten games (nine starts). After his success in the Gulf Coast League, Burrows was promoted to the West Michigan Whitecaps for the 2016 season. He spent the whole season there and posted a 6–4 record with a 3.15 ERA in 21 games (20 being starts). In 2017, Burrows spent time with both the Lakeland Flying Tigers and the Erie SeaWolves, posting a combined 10–7 record and 3.20 ERA in 26 combined starts between both teams. He spent 2018 with Erie, pitching to a 10–9 record with a 4.10 ERA in 26 starts.

Burrows began 2019 with the Toledo Mud Hens. Burrows struggled with injuries over the course of the 2019 season and would ultimately start just 15 games in Toledo. He finished with a 2–6 record and 5.51 ERA in Toledo.

Burrows was added to the Tigers 40-man roster following the 2019 season. Burrows made his major league debut on July 27, 2020, but allowed two home runs and three earned runs over 2 1/3 innings. With the 2020 Detroit Tigers, Burrows appeared in five games, compiling a 0–0 record with 5.40 ERA and three strikeouts in 6 2/3 innings pitched.

Burrows made his 2021 debut with the Tigers in June before being pulled from the game after becoming ill in the hot afternoon sun and vomiting on the mound. After the game, the Tigers optioned Burrows back to Toledo. Burrows was designated for assignment by Detroit on June 15, 2021.

=== Minnesota Twins ===
On June 22, 2021, the Minnesota Twins claimed Burrows off waivers and assigned him to the Triple-A St. Paul Saints. On July 17, Burrows was recalled to the active roster by Minnesota. On August 19, the Twins sent Burrows outright to Triple-A St. Paul.

=== Los Angeles Dodgers ===
On November 23, 2021, Burrows signed a minor league contract with the Los Angeles Dodgers organization. He spent the season with the Triple-A Oklahoma City Dodgers, pitching in 31 games (16 starts) with an 8–6 record and 7.18 ERA. On October 6, 2022, the Dodgers added Burrows to their 40-man roster to prevent him from reaching minor–league free agency. Burrows cleared waivers and was sent outright to Triple–A on October 22, but elected to become a free agent rather than accept the outright assignment.

=== Atlanta Braves ===
On February 23, 2023, Burrows signed a minor league contract with the Atlanta Braves. He spent the year with the Triple–A Gwinnett Stripers, also appearing in one game for the Double–A Mississippi Braves. In 36 games for Gwinnett, Burrows posted a 5.67 ERA with 71 strikeouts across 73 innings. He elected free agency following the season on November 6.

=== Philadelphia Phillies ===
On January 31, 2024, Burrows signed a minor league contract with the Minnesota Twins. He was released by the Twins organization on March 21. On March 25, Burrows signed a minor league contract with the Philadelphia Phillies. He made 16 appearances split between the Double–A Reading Fightin Phils and Triple–A Lehigh Valley IronPigs, compiling a 6.45 ERA with 21 strikeouts across 22 1/3 innings pitched. Burrows was released by the Phillies organization.

=== Cleburne Railroaders ===
On June 21, 2024, Burrows signed with the Cleburne Railroaders of the American Association of Professional Baseball. In 11 games for Cleburne, he struggled to a 7.24 ERA with 23 strikeouts across 13 2/3 innings pitched. Burrows was released by the Railroaders on August 11. On August 21, he re–signed with Cleburne.

=== Tecolotes de los Dos Laredos ===
On April 15, 2025, Burrows signed with the Tecolotes de los Dos Laredos of the Mexican League. In eight appearances for the Tecolotes, Burrows struggled to an 0-2 record and 9.53 ERA with 10 strikeouts across 5 2/3 innings pitched.

=== Pittsburgh Pirates ===
On May 7, 2025, Burrows signed a minor league contract with the Pittsburgh Pirates. He made 37 appearances split between the Single-A Bradenton Marauders, High-A Greensboro Grasshoppers, Double-A Altoona Curve, and Triple-A Indianapolis Indians, accumulating a 3-3 record and 2.94 ERA with 49 strikeouts and nine saves over 49 innings of work. Burrows elected free agency following the season on November 6.

On November 26, 2025, Burrows re-signed with the Pirates organization on a new minor league contract. In 52 games (2 starts) with Triple-A Indianapolis Indians he threw 66 innings going 7-4 with a 3.55 ERA with 62 strikeouts and 14 saves. He elected free agency on November 2.
