= Gilberto Celestino =

Dominican baseball player (born 1999)

Toros de Tijuana – No. 2
- Outfielder
- Born: February 13, 1999 (age 27); Santo Domingo, Dominican Republic
- Bats: Right Throws: Left

MLB debut
- June 2, 2021, for the Minnesota Twins

MLB statistics (through 2022 season)
- Batting average: .222
- Home runs: 4
- Runs batted in: 27
- Stats at Baseball Reference

Teams
- Minnesota Twins (2021–2022)

Gilberto Celestino (born February 13, 1999) is a Dominican professional baseball outfielder for the Toros de Tijuana of the Mexican League. He has previously played in Major League Baseball (MLB) for the Minnesota Twins.

== Career ==
=== Houston Astros ===
Celestino signed with the Houston Astros as an international free agent on July 2, 2015, for a $2.25 million signing bonus. He split the 2016 season between the Dominican Summer League Astros and Gulf Coast League Astros, hitting a combined .257/.365/.393 with two home runs and 19 RBI. He spent the 2017 season with the rookie–level Greeneville Astros, hitting .268/.331/.379 with four home runs and 24 RBI.

=== Minnesota Twins ===
On July 27, 2018, Celestino and Jorge Alcalá were traded to the Minnesota Twins in exchange for Ryan Pressly. Celestino split the 2018 season between the Tri-City ValleyCats, Corpus Christi Hooks, and the Elizabethton Twins, hitting a combined .287/.341/.406 with five home runs and 34 RBI.

In 2019, Celestino split the season between the Cedar Rapids Kernels and the Fort Myers Miracle, hitting a combined .277/.349/.410 with 10 home runs and 54 RBI. Celestino played for the Dominican Republic national baseball team at the 2019 WBSC Premier12. On November 20, 2019, Celestino was added to the Twins' 40-man roster in order to be protected from the Rule 5 draft. Celestino did not play in a game in 2020 due to the cancellation of the minor league season because of the COVID-19 pandemic.

On June 2, 2021, Celestino was promoted to the major leagues for the first time. He made his MLB debut that day as the starting center fielder against the Baltimore Orioles. In the game, he went 0-for-2 before being subbed out for Miguel Sanó. On June 9, Celestino notched his first career hit, a single off of New York Yankees reliever Brooks Kriske. He appeared in 23 games for Minnesota in his rookie campaign, hitting .136/.177/.288 with 2 home runs and 3 RBI. In 2022, Celestino appeared in 122 contests with the Twins, slashing .238/.313/.302 with 2 home runs and 24 RBI.

On March 2, 2023, Celestino suffered a ruptured ulnar collateral ligament in his left thumb, and underwent thumb surgery that included a recovery period of 6–8 weeks. He was activated from the injured list on June 18, and was subsequently optioned to the Triple–A St. Paul Saints. Celestino did not play in a game for Minnesota, hitting .243 with 4 home runs and 31 RBI in 55 games for St. Paul. On October 1, Celestino was designated for assignment by Minnesota. He cleared waivers and was sent outright to St. Paul on October 5. Celestino elected free agency on November 6.

=== Pittsburgh Pirates ===
On November 20, 2023, Celestino signed a minor league contract with the Pittsburgh Pirates. In 67 games for the Triple–A Indianapolis Indians in 2024, Celestino batted .271/.349/.356 with three home runs, 25 RBI, and nine stolen bases.

=== Chicago Cubs ===
On July 25, 2024, Celestino was traded to the Chicago Cubs in exchange for cash considerations. In 5 games for the Triple–A Iowa Cubs, he went 6–for–19 (.316) with one RBI. Celestino was released by the Cubs organization on August 11.

=== New York Mets ===
On February 5, 2025, Celestino signed a minor league contract with the New York Mets. He made 111 appearances for the Triple-A Syracuse Mets, batting .272/.362/.382 with nine home runs, 40 RBI, and 13 stolen bases. Celestino elected free agency following the season on November 6.

=== Texas Rangers ===
On January 2, 2026, Celestino signed with the Toros de Tijuana of the Mexican League. However, on February 9, the team confirmed he had signed a minor league contract with the Texas Rangers that included an invitation to spring training. Celestino made 51 appearances for the Triple–A Round Rock Express, batting .275/.363/.393 with three home runs, 24 RBI, and 13 stolen bases. He was released by the Rangers organization on July 17.

=== Toros de Tijuana ===
On August 4, 2026, Celestino signed with the Toros de Tijuana of the Mexican League.
