= Juan Minaya =

Dominican baseball player (born 1990)

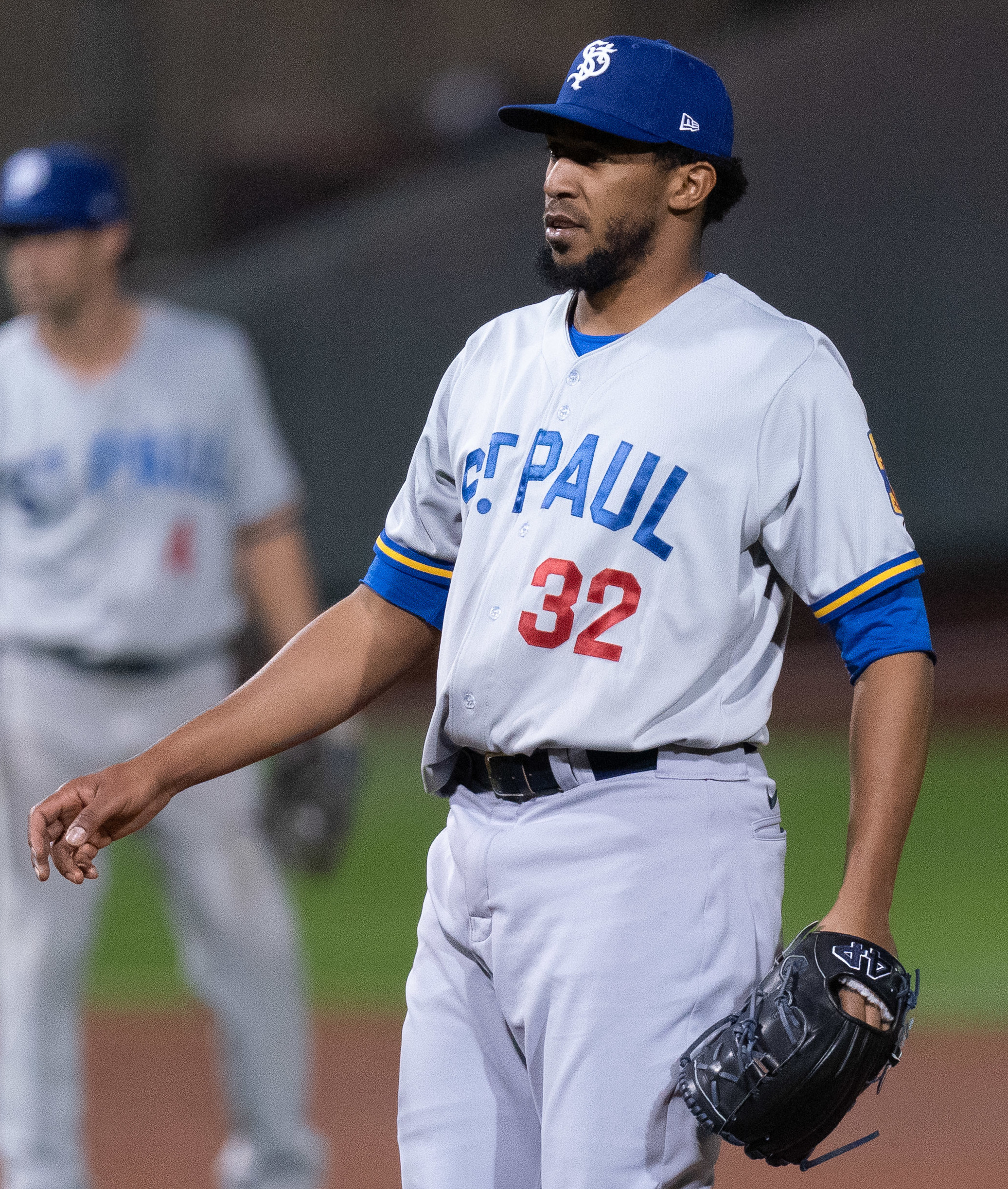
- Minaya with the St. Paul Saints in 2021
- Pitcher
- Born: September 18, 1990 (age 36); Maimón, Dominican Republic
- Batted: Right Threw: Right

MLB debut
- September 1, 2016, for the Chicago White Sox

Last MLB appearance
- July 3, 2022, for the Minnesota Twins

MLB statistics
- Win–loss record: 9–5
- Earned run average: 3.69
- Strikeouts: 196
- Stats at Baseball Reference

Teams
- Chicago White Sox (2016–2019); Minnesota Twins (2021–2022)

Juan Gustavo Minaya (born September 18, 1990) is a Dominican former professional baseball pitcher. He has previously played in Major League Baseball (MLB) for the Chicago White Sox and Minnesota Twins.

== Career ==
=== Houston Astros ===
On June 21, 2009, Minaya signed with the Houston Astros as an international free agent. He made his professional debut with the GCL Astros. In 2010, Minaya played for the Single-A Lexington Legends, recording a 4–12 record and 4.79 ERA in 26 appearances. He appeared in 28 games for Lexington the next year, pitching to a 1–5 record and 6.90 ERA. He spent the 2012 season with the Low-A Tri-City ValleyCats, registering a 2–2 record and 4.66 ERA with 31 strikeouts. In 2013, he played for the Single-A Quad Cities River Bandits, pitching to a 3–6 record and 4.77 ERA in 54.2 innings of work. He split the 2014 season between the High-A Lancaster JetHawks and the Double-A Corpus Christi Hooks, accumulating a 2–3 record and 4.19 ERA in 53.2 innings pitched. He split the 2015 season between Corpus Christi and the Triple-A Fresno Grizzlies, posting a 2.80 ERA with 59 strikeouts in 35 appearances between the two teams. The Astros added him to their 40-man roster after the 2015 season. On June 14, 2016, Minaya was designated for assignment by the Astros.

=== Chicago White Sox ===
On June 22, 2016, Minaya was claimed off waivers by the Chicago White Sox. He was promoted to the major leagues for the first time on September 1, and made his MLB debut that day, pitching a scoreless innings of relief against the Minnesota Twins. He finished his rookie season with a 4.35 ERA in 11 appearances. In 40 games for the White Sox in 2017, Minaya pitched to a 3–2 record and 4.53 ERA with 51 strikeouts. He appeared in 52 games for Chicago in 2018, posting a 2–2 record and 3.28 ERA with 58 strikeouts in 46.2 innings of work. On March 15, 2019, Minaya was outrighted off of the 40-man roster and assigned to the Triple-A Charlotte Knights. On May 5, Minaya was selected to the active roster. Minaya pitched to a 3.90 ERA in 22 games before he was designated for assignment on July 13. He was assigned outright to Triple-A Charlotte on July 17, where he spent the remainder of the season. He elected free agency on October 1.

=== Minnesota Twins ===
On January 28, 2020, Minaya signed a minor league deal with the Minnesota Twins organization. On August 28, 2020, Minaya's contract was selected to the active roster. On September 1, Minaya was designated for assignment without making an appearance for the big league club. Minaya was outrighted to the alternate training site and elected free agency on October 7, 2020.

On December 17, 2020, Minaya re-signed with the Twins on a new minor league contract. On May 29, 2021, Minaya was selected to the active roster. After recording a 4.26 ERA in 4 appearances for Minnesota, he was designated for assignment on June 5. He was outrighted to the Triple-A St. Paul Saints on June 8. On July 17, Minaya was re-selected to the active roster.

On November 30, Minaya was non-tendered by the Twins, making him a free agent. On March 11, 2022, Minaya re-signed with the Twins on a minor league contract. On May 28, 2022, Minaya had his contract selected to the major league roster. He was designated for assignment on June 7. Minaya cleared waivers and was sent outright to the Triple-A St. Paul Saints on June 11. On July 1, Minaya was selected back to the active roster. He was designated for assignment on July 4 and sent outright to Triple-A St. Paul on July 6. In 6 total appearances for Minnesota, Minaya logged a 5.59 ERA with 11 strikeouts in 9.2 innings of work. He was released by the Twins organization on September 5.

=== Washington Nationals ===
On September 7, 2022, Minaya signed a minor league deal with the Washington Nationals. He spent the remainder of the season with the Triple-A Rochester Red Wings, pitching to an 0–2 record and 3.12 ERA with 6 strikeouts in 8.2 innings pitched across 6 appearances. He elected free agency on October 6.

=== Pittsburgh Pirates ===
On February 4, 2023, Minaya signed a minor league contract with the Pittsburgh Pirates organization. He made 34 appearances split between the Double–A Altoona Curve and Triple–A Indianapolis Indians, compiling a 4.34 ERA with 41 strikeouts across 37 1/3 innings of work. Minaya elected free agency following the season on November 6.
