= 2020 Texas Rangers season =

2020 Texas Rangers
- League: American League
- Division: West
- Ballpark: Globe Life Field
- City: Arlington
- Record: 22–38 (.367)
- Divisional place: 5th
- Owners: Ray Davis & Bob R. Simpson
- Managers: Chris Woodward
- Television: Fox Sports Southwest (Dave Raymond, C.J. Nitkowski, Tom Grieve)
- Radio: KRLD 105.3 FM (English) (Eric Nadel, Matt Hicks, Dave Raymond); KZMP 1540 AM (Spanish) (Eleno Orlenas, Jerry Romo)
- Stats: ESPN.com; Baseball Reference

The 2020 Texas Rangers season was the 60th of the Texas Rangers franchise overall, their 49th in Arlington as the Rangers, and the inaugural season at the newly constructed Globe Life Field.

On March 12, 2020, MLB announced that because of the ongoing COVID-19 pandemic, the start of the regular season would be delayed by at least two weeks in addition to the remainder of spring training being cancelled. Four days later, it was announced that the start of the season would be pushed back indefinitely due to the recommendation made by the CDC to restrict events of more than 50 people for eight weeks. On June 23, commissioner Rob Manfred unilaterally implemented a 60-game season. Players reported to training camps on July 1 in order to resume spring training and prepare for a July 24 Opening Day.

== Spring training ==
Texas Ranger pitchers and catchers reported on February 11, 2020, to spring training in Surprise, Arizona, United States.

== Regular season ==
=== Season standings ===
==== American League West ====
AL West
Team	W	L	Pct.	GB	Home	Road
Oakland Athletics	36	24	.600	—	22‍–‍10	14‍–‍14
Houston Astros	29	31	.483	7	20‍–‍9	9‍–‍22
Seattle Mariners	27	33	.450	9	14‍–‍10	13‍–‍23
Los Angeles Angels	26	34	.433	10	16‍–‍15	10‍–‍19
Texas Rangers	22	38	.367	14	16‍–‍14	6‍–‍24

==== American League Wild Card ====
Division leaders
Team	W	L	Pct.
Tampa Bay Rays	40	20	.667
Oakland Athletics	36	24	.600
Minnesota Twins	36	24	.600

Division 2nd place
Team	W	L	Pct.
Cleveland Indians	35	25	.583
New York Yankees	33	27	.550
Houston Astros	29	31	.483

Wild Card teams (Top 2 teams qualify for postseason)
Team	W	L	Pct.	GB
Chicago White Sox	35	25	.583	+3
Toronto Blue Jays	32	28	.533	—
Seattle Mariners	27	33	.450	5
Los Angeles Angels	26	34	.433	6
Kansas City Royals	26	34	.433	6
Baltimore Orioles	25	35	.417	7
Boston Red Sox	24	36	.400	8
Detroit Tigers	23	35	.397	8
Texas Rangers	22	38	.367	10

==== Record against opponents ====
2020 American League record Source: MLB Standings Grid – 2020
Team	HOU	LAA	OAK	SEA	TEX	NL
Houston	—	4–6	3–7	7–3	5–5	10–10
Los Angeles	6–4	—	4–6	5–5	4–6	7–13
Oakland	7–3	6–4	—	6–4	7–3	10–10
Seattle	3–7	5–5	4–6	—	8–2	7–13
Texas	5–5	6–4	3–7	2–8	—	6–14

== Roster ==
2020 Texas Rangers
Roster
Pitchers: 39 Kolby Allard; 75 Wes Benjamin; 30 Jesse Chavez; 73 Kyle Cody; 67 Demarcus Evans; 60 Luke Farrell; 45 Luis García; 63 Ian Gibaut; 44 Kyle Gibson; 41 Nick Goody; 52 Taylor Hearn; 64 Jimmy Herget; 72 Jonathan Hernández; 79 John King; 28 Corey Kluber; 25 José Leclerc; 35 Lance Lynn; 24 Jordan Lyles; 59 Brett Martin; 23 Mike Minor; 48 Rafael Montero; 40 Juan Nicasio; 62 Joe Palumbo; 57 Joely Rodríguez; 36 Edinson Vólquez	Catchers: 61 Robinson Chirinos; 74 Sam Huff; 2 Jeff Mathis; 56 Jose Trevino; Infielders: 1 Elvis Andrus; 82 Sherten Apostel; 32 Derek Dietrich; 21 Todd Frazier; 11 Ronald Guzmán; 9 Isiah Kiner-Falefa; 12 Rougned Odor; 14 Rob Refsnyder; 33 Yadiel Rivera; 6 Andrew Romine; 38 Danny Santana; 71 Anderson Tejeda	Outfielders: 5 Willie Calhoun; 17 Shin-Soo Choo; 13 Joey Gallo; 53 Adolis García; 16 Scott Heineman; 15 Nick Solak; 65 Leody Taveras; 76 Eli White	Manager: 8 Chris Woodward; Coaches: 27 Tony Beasley (third base); 99 Callix Crabbe (assistant hitting); 66 Josh Frasier (bullpen catcher); 64 Doug Mathis (bullpen); 4 Héctor Ortiz (catching coordinator); 18 Luis Ortiz (hitting); 43 Corey Ragsdale (first base); 47 Julio Rangel (pitching); 22 Don Wakamatsu (bench)

== Player stats ==
=== Batting ===
Note: G = Games played; AB = At bats; R = Runs; H = Hits; 2B = Doubles; 3B = Triples; HR = Home runs; RBI = Runs batted in; SB = Stolen bases; BB = Walks; AVG = Batting average; SLG = Slugging average

Player	G	AB	R	H	2B	3B	HR	RBI	SB	BB	AVG	SLG
Isiah Kiner-Falefa	58	211	28	59	4	3	3	10	8	14	.280	.370
Nick Solak	58	209	27	56	10	0	2	23	7	18	.268	.344
Joey Gallo	57	193	23	35	8	0	10	26	2	29	.181	.378
Rougned Odor	38	138	15	23	4	0	10	30	0	7	.167	.413
Leody Taveras	33	119	20	27	6	1	4	6	8	14	.227	.395
Shin-Soo Choo	33	110	13	26	3	0	5	15	6	13	.236	.400
Todd Frazier	31	108	11	26	7	1	2	7	1	10	.241	.380
Elvis Andrus	29	103	11	20	5	0	3	7	3	8	.194	.330
Willie Calhoun	29	100	3	19	2	1	1	13	0	5	.190	.260
Ronald Guzmán	26	78	10	19	1	1	4	9	1	7	.244	.436
Jose Trevino	24	76	10	19	8	0	2	9	0	3	.250	.434
Anderson Tejeda	23	75	7	19	4	1	3	8	4	2	.253	.453
Jeff Mathis	24	62	6	10	1	1	3	9	1	5	.161	.355
Derek Dietrich	25	61	9	12	1	0	5	8	1	9	.197	.459
Danny Santana	15	55	6	8	4	0	1	7	2	7	.145	.273
Scott Heineman	24	52	6	8	3	0	1	7	3	2	.154	.269
Robinson Chirinos	14	42	3	5	1	0	0	2	0	5	.119	.143
Sam Huff	10	31	5	11	3	0	3	4	0	2	.355	.742
Rob Refsnyder	15	30	4	6	1	0	0	1	0	2	.200	.233
Sherten Apostel	7	20	1	2	1	0	0	0	0	1	.100	.150
Adolis García	3	6	0	0	0	0	0	0	0	1	.000	.000
Yadiel Rivera	4	5	0	0	0	0	0	0	1	0	.000	.000
Andrew Romine	2	4	1	1	1	0	0	0	0	0	.250	.500
Team totals	60	1936	224	420	80	9	62	204	49	167	.217	.364

=== Pitching ===
Note: W = Wins; L = Losses; ERA = Earned run average; G = Games pitched; GS = Games started; SV = Saves; IP = Innings pitched; H = Hits allowed; R = Runs allowed; ER = Earned runs allowed; BB = Walks allowed; SO = Strikeouts

Player	W	L	ERA	G	GS	SV	IP	H	R	ER	BB	SO
Lance Lynn	6	3	3.32	13	13	0	84.0	64	34	31	25	89
Kyle Gibson	2	6	5.35	12	12	0	67.1	73	44	40	30	58
Jordan Lyles	1	6	7.02	12	9	0	57.2	67	49	45	23	36
Mike Minor	0	5	5.60	7	7	0	35.1	35	23	22	13	35
Kolby Allard	0	6	7.75	11	8	0	33.2	31	29	29	20	32
Jonathan Hernández	5	1	2.90	27	0	0	31.0	24	10	10	8	31
Kyle Cody	1	1	1.59	8	5	0	22.2	15	5	4	13	18
Wes Benjamin	2	1	4.84	8	1	0	22.1	24	12	12	7	21
Jimmy Herget	1	0	3.20	20	1	0	19.2	13	7	7	14	17
Rafael Montero	0	1	4.08	17	0	8	17.2	12	11	8	6	19
Taylor Hearn	0	0	3.63	14	0	0	17.1	13	8	7	11	23
Jesse Chavez	0	0	6.88	18	0	0	17.0	20	13	13	7	13
Brett Martin	1	1	1.84	15	0	0	14.2	8	5	3	9	8
Joely Rodríguez	0	0	2.13	12	0	0	12.2	8	3	3	5	17
Ian Gibaut	0	1	6.57	14	0	0	12.1	11	10	9	9	14
Nick Goody	0	2	9.00	17	1	1	11.0	14	12	11	8	13
John King	1	0	6.10	6	0	0	10.1	13	8	7	4	9
Luis García	0	2	7.56	11	2	0	8.1	10	9	7	9	11
Edinson Vólquez	2	1	6.35	7	0	0	5.2	6	4	4	2	3
Luke Farrell	0	0	8.44	4	0	0	5.1	5	5	5	5	8
Demarcus Evans	0	0	2.25	4	0	0	4.0	3	1	1	0	4
Joe Palumbo	0	1	11.57	2	0	0	2.1	3	3	3	3	5
José Leclerc	0	0	4.50	2	0	1	2.0	2	1	1	2	3
Juan Nicasio	0	0	40.50	2	0	0	1.1	5	6	6	2	1
Corey Kluber	0	0	0.00	1	1	0	1.0	0	0	0	1	1
Team totals	22	38	5.02	60	60	10	516.2	479	312	288	236	489

== Game log ==
2020 Game Log 22–38 (Home: 16–14; Away: 6–24)
July: 2–4 (Home: 2–3; Away: 0–1)

#	Date	Opponent	Score	Win	Loss	Save	Record	Streak
1	July 24	Rockies	1–0	**Lynn** (1–0)	Márquez (0–1)	**Leclerc** (1)	1–0	W1
2	July 25	Rockies	2–3	Bard (1–0)	**Minor** (0–1)	Davis (1)	1–1	L1
3	July 26	Rockies	2–5	Freeland (1–0)	**Palumbo** (0–1)	Davis (2)	1–2	L2
4	July 28	Diamondbacks	1–4	Kelly (1–0)	**Gibson** (0–1)	Bradley (1)	1–3	L3
5	July 29	Diamondbacks	7–4	**Hernández** (1–0)	Chafin (0–1)	**Goody** (1)	2–3	W1
6	July 31	@ Giants	2–9	Menez (1–0)	**Minor** (0–2)	—	2–4	L1

August: 10–17 (Home: 7–7; Away: 3–10)

#	Date	Opponent	Score	Win	Loss	Save	Record	Streak
7	August 1	@ Giants	3–7	Baragar (2–0)	**Lyles** (0–1)	—	2–5	L2
8	August 2	@ Giants	9–5	**Hernández** (2–0)	Triggs (0–1)	—	3–5	W1
9	August 4	@ Athletics	1–5	Hendriks (1–0)	**Vólquez** (0–1)	—	3–6	L1
10	August 5	@ Athletics	4–6	McFarland (1–0)	**Gibaut** (0–1)	Soria (2)	3–7	L2
11	August 6	@ Athletics	4–6	Fiers (1–0)	**Minor** (0–3)	Hendriks (4)	3–8	L3
12	August 7	Angels	4–3	**Lyles** (1–1)	Canning (0–2)	**Montero** (1)	4–8	W1
13	August 8	Angels	2–0	**Vólquez** (1–1)	Sandoval (0–1)	**Montero** (2)	5–8	W2
14	August 9	Angels	7–3	**Lynn** (2–0)	Heaney (1–1)	—	6–8	W3
15	August 10	Mariners	2–10	Dunn (1–1)	**Gibson** (0–2)	—	6–9	L1
16	August 11	Mariners	4–2	**Vólquez** (2–1)	Gonzales (2–2)	**Montero** (3)	7–9	W1
17	August 12	Mariners	7–4	**Hernández** (3–0)	Swanson (0–1)	**Montero** (4)	8–9	W2
18	August 14	@ Rockies	3–2	**Lynn** (3–0)	Bard (1–1)	—	9–9	W3
19	August 15	@ Rockies	6–4	**Gibson** (1–2)	Márquez (2–3)	**Montero** (5)	10–9	W4
20	August 16	@ Rockies	6–10	Gray (1–2)	**Allard** (0–1)	Estévez (1)	10–10	L1
21	August 17	Padres	4–14	Davies (3–2)	**Lyles** (1–2)	—	10–11	L2
22	August 18	Padres	4–6	Stammen (2–1)	**Minor** (0–4)	Quantrill (1)	10–12	L3
23	August 19	@ Padres	3–6 (10)	Hill (1–0)	**Montero** (0–1)	—	10–13	L4
24	August 20	@ Padres	7–8 (10)	Johnson (2–1)	**García** (0–1)	—	10–14	L5
25	August 21	@ Mariners	4–7	Margevicius (1–1)	**Allard** (0–2)	Williams (5)	10–15	L6
26	August 22	@ Mariners	1–10	Sheffield (2–2)	**Lyles** (1–3)	—	10–16	L7
27	August 23	@ Mariners	1–4	Dunn (2–1)	**Minor** (0–5)	Williams (6)	10–17	L8
28	August 24	Athletics	3–2	**Lynn** (4–0)	Luzardo (2–1)	**Montero** (6)	11–17	W1
29	August 25	Athletics	3–10	Manaea (2–2)	**Gibson** (1–3)	—	11–18	L1
30	August 26	Athletics	1–3	Fiers (4–1)	**Allard** (0–3)	Hendriks (10)	11–19	L2
—	August 27	Athletics	Postponed (Strikes due to shooting of Jacob Blake); Makeup: September 12					
31	August 28	Dodgers	6–2	**Hernández** (4–0)	McGee (2–1)	—	12–19	W1
32	August 29	Dodgers	4–7	Treinen (3–1)	**Lynn** (4–1)	Jansen (9)	12–20	L1
33	August 30	Dodgers	2–7	Alexander (2–0)	**Gibson** (1–4)	—	12–21	L2

September: 10–17 (Home: 7–4; Away: 3–13)

#	Date	Opponent	Score	Win	Loss	Save	Record	Streak
34	September 1	@ Astros	6–5 (10)	**Hernández** (5–0)	Taylor (1–1)	**Montero** (7)	13–21	W1
35	September 2	@ Astros	1–2	Javier (4–1)	**Allard** (0–4)	Pressly (7)	13–22	L1
36	September 3	@ Astros	4–8	Greinke (3–0)	**Lynn** (4–2)	—	13–23	L2
37	September 4	@ Mariners	3–6	Kikuchi (2–2)	**Cody** (0–1)	—	13–24	L3
38	September 5	@ Mariners	3–5	Gerber (1–0)	**Hernández** (5–1)	Ramírez (2)	13–25	L4
39	September 6	@ Mariners	3–4	Dunn (3–1)	**Lyles** (1–4)	Hirano (1)	13–26	L5
40	September 7	@ Mariners	4–8	Gonzales (5–2)	**Allard** (0–5)	Ramírez (3)	13–27	L6
41	September 8	Angels	7–1	**Lynn** (5–2)	Heaney (3–3)	—	14–27	W1
42	September 9	Angels	7–3	**King** (1–0)	Teherán (0–3)	—	15–27	W2
43	September 10	Angels	2–6	Bundy (5–2)	**Gibson** (1–5)	—	15–28	L1
44	September 11	Athletics	6–10	Fiers (5–2)	**García** (0–2)	—	15–29	L2
45	September 12 (1)	Athletics	5–2 (7)	**Benjamin** (1–0)	Jefferies (0–1)	**Montero** (8)	16–29	W1
46	September 12 (2)	Athletics	1–10 (7)	Bassitt (4–2)	**Allard** (0–6)	—	16–30	L1
47	September 13	Athletics	6–3	**Lynn** (6–2)	Montas (3–4)	—	17–30	W1
48	September 15	@ Astros	1–4	Urquidy (1–1)	**Goody** (0–1)	Pressly (10)	17–31	L1
49	September 16	@ Astros	1–0	**Gibson** (2–5)	Pressly (1–3)	—	18–31	W1
50	September 17	@ Astros	1–2	Valdez (4–3)	**Lyles** (1–5)	Raley (1)	18–32	L1
51	September 18	@ Angels	2–6	Barría (1–0)	**Benjamin** (1–1)	—	18–33	L2
52	September 19	@ Angels	3–4	Mayers (2–0)	**Martin** (0–1)	—	18–34	L3
53	September 20	@ Angels	7–2	**Cody** (1–1)	Teherán (0–4)	—	19–34	W1
54	September 21	@ Angels	5–8	Bundy (6–3)	**Gibson** (2–6)	Mayers (1)	19–35	L1
55	September 22	@ Diamondbacks	0–7	Smith (2–0)	**Lyles** (1–6)	—	19–36	L2
56	September 23	@ Diamondbacks	3–7	Mella (2–0)	**Goody** (0–2)	—	19–37	L3
57	September 24	Astros	4–12	Javier (5–2)	**Lynn** (6–3)	—	19–38	L4
58	September 25	Astros	5–4 (10)	**Martin** (1–1)	Paredes (3–3)	—	20–38	W1
59	September 26	Astros	6–1	**Herget** (1–0)	Bielak (3–3)	—	21–38	W2
60	September 27	Astros	8–4	**Benjamin** (2–1)	De Jong (0–1)	—	22–38	W3

Legend: = Win = Loss = Postponement
Bold = Rangers team member

== Farm system ==
Level	Team	League	Manager
AAA	Nashville Sounds	Pacific Coast League	
AA	Frisco RoughRiders	Texas League	
A-Advanced	Down East Wood Ducks	Carolina League	
A	Hickory Crawdads	South Atlantic League	
A-Short Season	Spokane Indians	Northwest League	
Rookie	AZL Rangers	Arizona League	
Rookie	DSL Rangers	Dominican Summer League	
