= 2020 Los Angeles Angels season =

Major League Baseball season

2020 Los Angeles Angels
- League: American League
- Division: West
- Ballpark: Angel Stadium
- City: Anaheim, California
- Record: 26–34 (.433)
- Divisional place: 4th
- Owner: Arte Moreno
- Manager: Joe Maddon
- Television: Fox Sports West (Victor Rojas, Mark Gubicza)
- Radio: KLAA (AM 830); KSPN (AM 710); Angels Radio Network (Terry Smith, Mark Langston, José Mota); Spanish: KWKW (AM 1330)
- Stats: ESPN.com; Baseball Reference

The 2020 Los Angeles Angels season was the 60th season of the Angels franchise in the American League and the 55th in Anaheim. The Angels were managed by Joe Maddon, in his first season as manager of the Angels. The Angels played their home games at Angel Stadium as members of Major League Baseball's American League West Division. Los Angeles opened the season on July 24 at the Oakland Athletics and finished the season at the Los Angeles Dodgers.

The Angels finished the season 26–34 to finish in fourth place in the division.

The season was shortened to a 60-game schedule due to the ongoing COVID-19 pandemic.

== Previous season ==
The Angels finished the 2019 season 72–90 to finish in last place in the West Division. On September 30, 2019, the Angels fired manager Brad Ausmus after only one season with the Angels.

=== Coaching changes ===
After the club had fired Ausmus, speculation increased that the Angels would hire Joe Maddon, who had previously a bench coach with the Angels and spent 20 years in the Angels' system. On October 16, the Angels named Maddon the team's new manager.

== COVID-19 effects on season ==
On March 12, 2020, MLB announced that because of the ongoing COVID-19 pandemic, the start of the regular season would be delayed by at least two weeks in addition to the remainder of spring training being cancelled. Four days later, it was announced that the start of the season would be pushed back indefinitely due to the recommendation made by the CDC to restrict events of more than 50 people for eight weeks. On June 23, commissioner Rob Manfred unilaterally implemented a 60-game season. Players reported to training camps on July 1 in order to resume spring training and prepare for a July 24 Opening Day.

== Regular season ==
=== Game log ===
2020 season game log: 26–34 (Home: 14–16; Away: 12–18)
July: 2–6 (Home: 1–3; Away: 1–3)

#	Date	Opponent	Score	Win	Loss	Save	Record	Streak
1	July 24	@ Athletics	3–7 (10)	Smith (1–0)	**Robles** (0–1)	—	0–1	L1
2	July 25	@ Athletics	4–1	**Bundy** (1–0)	Manaea (0–1)	**Robles** (1)	1–1	W1
3	July 26	@ Athletics	4–6	Petit (1–0)	**Ohtani** (0–1)	Hendriks (1)	1–2	L1
4	July 27	@ Athletics	0–3	Smith (2–0)	**Canning** (0–1)	Soria (1)	1–3	L2
5	July 28	Mariners	10–2	**Buchter** (1–0)	Sheffield (0–1)	—	2–3	W1
6	July 29	Mariners	7–10	Shaw (1–0)	**Barnes** (0–1)	Altavilla (1)	2–4	L1
7	July 30	Mariners	5–8	Gonzales (1–1)	**Bundy** (1–1)	—	2–5	L2
8	July 31	Astros	6–9	Bielak (2–0)	**Andriese** (0–1)	Scrubb (1)	2–6	L3

August: 10–18 (Home: 4–8; Away: 6–10)

#	Date	Opponent	Score	Win	Loss	Save	Record	Streak
9	August 1	Astros	5–4 (10)	**Buchter** (2–0)	Rodríguez (0–1)	—	3–6	W1
10	August 2	Astros	5–6 (11)	Taylor (1–0)	**Barnes** (0–2)	—	3–7	L1
11	August 4	@ Mariners	5–3	**Heaney** (1–0)	Dunn (0–1)	**Buttrey** (1)	4–7	W1
12	August 5	@ Mariners	6–7	Gonzales (2–1)	**Teherán** (0–1)	Edwards Jr. (1)	4–8	L1
13	August 6	@ Mariners	6–1	**Bundy** (2–1)	Walker (1–2)	—	5–8	W1
14	August 7	@ Rangers	3–4	Lyles (1–1)	**Canning** (0–2)	Montero (1)	5–9	L1
15	August 8	@ Rangers	0–2	Vólquez (1–1)	**Sandoval** (0–1)	Montero (2)	5–10	L2
16	August 9	@ Rangers	3–7	Lynn (2–0)	**Heaney** (1–1)	—	5–11	L3
17	August 10	Athletics	10–9	**Peña** (1–0)	Petit (1–1)	**Buttrey** (2)	6–11	W1
18	August 11	Athletics	6–0	**Bundy** (3–1)	Fiers (1–1)	—	7–11	W2
19	August 12	Athletics	4–8	Bassitt (2–0)	**Canning** (0–3)	—	7–12	L1
20	August 14	Dodgers	4–7	Kershaw (2–1)	**Sandoval** (0–2)	Jansen (5)	7–13	L2
21	August 15	Dodgers	5–6 (10)	McGee (2–0)	**Middleton** (0–1)	Jansen (6)	7–14	L3
22	August 16	Dodgers	3–8	Alexander (1–0)	**Teherán** (0–2)	—	7–15	L4
23	August 17	Giants	7–6	**Buttrey** (1–0)	Gott (1–2)	—	8–15	W1
24	August 18	Giants	2–8	García (1–1)	**Bundy** (3–2)	—	8–16	L1
25	August 19	@ Giants	2–7	Cueto (2–0)	**Sandoval** (0–3)	—	8–17	L2
26	August 20	@ Giants	5–10	Gausman (1–1)	**Suárez** (0–1)	—	8–18	L3
27	August 21	@ Athletics	3–5	Fiers (3–1)	**Heaney** (1–2)	Hendriks (9)	8–19	L4
28	August 22	@ Athletics	4–3	**Andriese** (1–1)	Bassitt (2–1)	**Buttrey** (3)	9–19	W1
29	August 23	@ Athletics	4–5 (10)	Hendriks (2–0)	**Buttrey** (1–1)	—	9–20	L1
30	August 24	@ Astros	4–11	Valdez (3–2)	**Sandoval** (0–4)	—	9–21	L2
31	August 25 (1)	@ Astros	3–6 (7)	Javier (3–1)	**Suárez** (0–2)	Pressly (4)	9–22	L3
32	August 25 (2)	@ Astros	12–5 (7)	**Peña** (2–0)	Bielak (3–2)	—	10–22	W1
—	August 26	@ Astros	Postponed (Hurricane Laura); Makeup: September 5					
33	August 28	Mariners	3–2	**Heaney** (2–2)	Margevicius (1–2)	**Buttrey** (4)	11–22	W2
34	August 29	Mariners	16–3	**Bundy** (4–2)	Sheffield (2–3)	—	12–22	W3
35	August 30	Mariners	1–2 (10)	Williams (1–1)	**Quijada** (0–1)	Ramírez (1)	12–23	L1
36	August 31	Mariners	1–2	Gonzales (4–2)	**Andriese** (1–2)	—	12–24	L2

September: 14–10 (Home: 8–4; Away: 6–6)

#	Date	Opponent	Score	Win	Loss	Save	Record	Streak
37	September 2	Padres	4–11	Hill (2–0)	**Buttrey** (1–2)	—	12–25	L3
38	September 3	Padres	2–0	**Heaney** (3–2)	Clevinger (1–2)	**Peña** (1)	13–25	W1
39	September 4	Astros	6–5 (11)	**Andriese** (2–2)	Raley (0–1)	—	14–25	W2
40	September 5 (1)	Astros	10–9 (7)	**Peña** (3–0)	Paredes (1–2)	—	15–25	W3
41	September 5 (2)	@ Astros	7–6	**Ramirez** (1–0)	Castellanos (0–1)	**Buttrey** (5)	16–25	W4
42	September 6	Astros	9–5	**Mayers** (1–0)	Valdez (3–3)	—	17–25	W5
43	September 8	@ Rangers	1–7	Lynn (5–2)	**Heaney** (3–3)	—	17–26	L1
44	September 9	@ Rangers	3–7	King (1–0)	**Teherán** (0–3)	—	17–27	L2
45	September 10	@ Rangers	6–2	**Bundy** (5–2)	Gibson (1–5)	—	18–27	W1
46	September 11	@ Rockies	4–8	Bard (3–2)	**Buttrey** (1–3)	—	18–28	L1
47	September 12	@ Rockies	5–2 (11)	**Buttrey** (2–3)	Kinley (0–2)	**Andriese** (1)	19–28	W1
48	September 13	@ Rockies	5–3	**Heaney** (4–3)	Estévez (1–3)	**Andriese** (2)	20–28	W2
49	September 15	Diamondbacks	8–9	Mella (1–0)	**Andriese** (2–3)	Crichton (2)	20–29	L1
50	September 16	Diamondbacks	6–9	Clarke (2–0)	**Bundy** (5–3)	Crichton (3)	20–30	L2
51	September 17	Diamondbacks	7–3	**Canning** (1–3)	Young (2–4)	—	21–30	W1
52	September 18	Rangers	6–2	**Barría** (1–0)	Benjamin (1–1)	—	22–30	W2
53	September 19	Rangers	4–3	**Mayers** (2–0)	Martin (0–1)	—	23–30	W3
54	September 20	Rangers	2–7	Cody (1–1)	**Teherán** (0–4)	—	23–31	L1
55	September 21	Rangers	8–5	**Bundy** (6–3)	Gibson (2–6)	**Mayers** (1)	24–31	W1
56	September 22	@ Padres	4–2	**Canning** (2–3)	Davies (7–4)	**Mayers** (2)	25–31	W2
57	September 23	@ Padres	5–2	**Sandoval** (1-4)	Morejón (2-2)	**Peña** (2)	26–31	W3
58	September 25	@ Dodgers	5–9	Graterol (1–2)	**Andriese** (2–4)	—	26–32	L1
59	September 26	@ Dodgers	6–7	Gonsolin (2–2)	**Robles** (0–2)	Kolarek (1)	26–33	L2
60	September 27	@ Dodgers	0–5	May (3–1)	**Sandoval** (1–5)	—	26–34	L3

Legend: = Win = Loss = Postponement
Bold = Angels team member

=== Season standings ===
==== American League West ====
AL West
Team	W	L	Pct.	GB	Home	Road
Oakland Athletics	36	24	.600	—	22‍–‍10	14‍–‍14
Houston Astros	29	31	.483	7	20‍–‍9	9‍–‍22
Seattle Mariners	27	33	.450	9	14‍–‍10	13‍–‍23
Los Angeles Angels	26	34	.433	10	16‍–‍15	10‍–‍19
Texas Rangers	22	38	.367	14	16‍–‍14	6‍–‍24

==== American League leaders ====
Division leaders
Team	W	L	Pct.
Tampa Bay Rays	40	20	.667
Oakland Athletics	36	24	.600
Minnesota Twins	36	24	.600

Division 2nd place
Team	W	L	Pct.
Cleveland Indians	35	25	.583
New York Yankees	33	27	.550
Houston Astros	29	31	.483

Wild Card teams (Top 2 teams qualify for postseason)
Team	W	L	Pct.	GB
Chicago White Sox	35	25	.583	+3
Toronto Blue Jays	32	28	.533	—
Seattle Mariners	27	33	.450	5
Los Angeles Angels	26	34	.433	6
Kansas City Royals	26	34	.433	6
Baltimore Orioles	25	35	.417	7
Boston Red Sox	24	36	.400	8
Detroit Tigers	23	35	.397	8
Texas Rangers	22	38	.367	10

=== Record against opponents ===
2020 American League record Source: MLB Standings Grid – 2020
Team	**HOU**	**LAA**	**OAK**	**SEA**	**TEX**	NL
Houston	—	4–6	3–7	7–3	5–5	10–10
Los Angeles	6–4	—	4–6	5–5	4–6	7–13
Oakland	7–3	6–4	—	6–4	7–3	10–10
Seattle	3–7	5–5	4–6	—	8–2	7–13
Texas	5–5	6–4	3–7	2–8	—	6–14

== Roster ==
2020 Los Angeles Angels
Roster
Pitchers: 35 Matt Andriese; 39 Luke Bard; 40 Jacob Barnes; 51 Jaime Barría; 32 Cam Bedrosian; 46 Ryan Buchter; 37 Dylan Bundy; 31 Ty Buttrey; 47 Griffin Canning; 28 Andrew Heaney; 68 Kyle Keller; 60 Mike Mayers; 99 Keynan Middleton; 61 Hoby Milner; 17 Shohei Ohtani; 64 Félix Peña; 52 Dillon Peters; 65 José Quijada; 24 Noe Ramirez; 57 Hansel Robles; 63 José Rodríguez; 43 Patrick Sandoval; 54 José Suárez; 49 Julio Teherán	Catchers: 12 Anthony Bemboom; 19 José Briceño; 16 Jason Castro; 33 Max Stassi; Infielders: 8 Franklin Barreto; 22 David Fletcher; 9 Jahmai Jones; 9 Tommy La Stella; 5 Albert Pujols; 6 Anthony Rendon; 4 Luis Rengifo; 2 Andrelton Simmons; 7 Elliot Soto; 23 Matt Thaiss; 25 Jared Walsh	Outfielders: 59 Jo Adell; 18 Brian Goodwin; 21 Michael Hermosillo; 27 Mike Trout; 10 Justin Upton; 3 Taylor Ward	Manager: 70 Joe Maddon; Coaches: 83 Matt Wise (bullpen); 55 Brian Butterfield (third base); 75 Mickey Callaway (pitching); 92 Manny Del Campo (bullpen catcher); 62 Jesús Feliciano (first base); 86 Mike Gallego (bench); 93 Jason Brown (bullpen catcher); 88 John Mallee (assistant hitting); 85 Ryan Garko (coaching assistant); 82 José Molina (catching); 77 Jeremy Reed (hitting); 87 Paul Sorrento (hitting instructor)

== Player stats ==
=== Batting ===
Note: G = Games played; AB = At bats; R = Runs; H = Hits; 2B = Doubles; 3B = Triples; HR = Home runs; RBI = Runs batted in; SB = Stolen bases; BB = Walks; AVG = Batting average; SLG = Slugging average

Player	G	AB	R	H	2B	3B	HR	RBI	SB	BB	AVG	SLG
David Fletcher	49	207	31	66	13	0	3	18	2	20	.319	.425
Mike Trout	53	199	41	56	9	2	17	46	1	35	.281	.603
Anthony Rendon	52	189	29	54	11	1	9	31	0	38	.286	.497
Shohei Ohtani	44	153	23	29	6	0	7	24	7	22	.190	.366
Albert Pujols	39	152	15	34	8	0	6	25	0	9	.224	.395
Justin Upton	42	147	20	30	5	0	9	22	0	11	.204	.422
Jo Adell	38	124	9	20	4	0	3	7	0	7	.161	.266
Andrelton Simmons	30	118	19	35	7	0	0	10	2	8	.297	.356
Tommy La Stella	28	99	15	27	8	0	4	14	1	15	.273	.475
Jared Walsh	32	99	19	29	4	2	9	26	0	5	.293	.646
Brian Goodwin	30	95	12	23	7	1	4	17	1	12	.242	.463
Taylor Ward	34	94	16	26	6	2	0	5	2	8	.277	.383
Max Stassi	31	90	12	25	2	0	7	20	0	11	.278	.533
Luis Rengifo	33	90	12	14	1	0	1	3	3	14	.156	.200
Jason Castro	18	52	5	10	4	0	2	6	0	10	.192	.385
Anthony Bemboom	21	48	9	10	1	0	3	5	0	7	.208	.417
Matt Thaiss	8	21	3	3	0	0	1	1	0	4	.143	.286
Franklin Barreto	6	17	0	2	0	0	0	2	1	0	.118	.118
Michael Hermosillo	7	8	0	2	0	0	0	2	1	1	.250	.250
Jahmai Jones	3	7	2	3	0	0	0	1	0	0	.429	.429
Elliot Soto	3	6	2	2	1	0	0	0	0	1	.333	.500
José Briceño	2	5	0	1	0	0	0	0	0	1	.200	.200
Team totals	60	2020	294	501	97	8	85	285	21	239	.248	.430

=== Pitching ===
Note: W = Wins; L = Losses; ERA = Earned run average; G = Games pitched; GS = Games started; SV = Saves; IP = Innings pitched; H = Hits allowed; R = Runs allowed; ER = Earned runs allowed; BB = Walks allowed; SO = Strikeouts

Player	W	L	ERA	G	GS	SV	IP	H	R	ER	BB	SO
Andrew Heaney	4	3	4.46	12	12	0	66.2	63	35	33	19	70
Dylan Bundy	6	3	3.29	11	11	0	65.2	51	27	24	17	72
Griffin Canning	2	3	3.99	11	11	0	56.1	54	29	25	23	56
Patrick Sandoval	1	5	5.65	9	6	0	36.2	37	26	23	12	33
Jaime Barría	1	0	3.62	7	5	0	32.1	27	13	13	9	27
Matt Andriese	2	4	4.50	16	1	2	32.0	21	17	16	11	33
Julio Teherán	0	4	10.05	10	9	0	31.1	39	35	35	16	20
Mike Mayers	2	0	2.10	29	0	2	30.0	18	10	7	9	43
Félix Peña	3	0	4.05	25	0	2	26.2	27	12	12	8	29
Ty Buttrey	2	3	5.81	27	0	5	26.1	28	18	17	9	18
Noé Ramirez	1	0	3.00	21	0	0	21.0	15	7	7	9	14
Jacob Barnes	0	2	5.50	18	0	0	18.0	19	13	11	4	24
Hansel Robles	0	2	10.26	18	0	1	16.2	19	20	19	10	20
Cam Bedrosian	0	0	2.45	11	0	0	14.2	10	4	4	6	11
Hoby Milner	0	0	8.10	19	0	0	13.1	13	12	12	6	13
Keynan Middleton	0	1	5.25	13	0	0	12.0	12	8	7	6	11
Ryan Buchter	2	0	4.50	10	0	0	6.0	5	4	3	6	8
Luke Bard	0	0	6.75	6	0	0	5.1	7	4	4	0	7
José Quijada	0	1	7.36	6	0	0	3.2	6	4	3	2	6
Kyle Keller	0	0	7.71	2	0	0	2.1	3	2	2	2	1
José Suárez	0	2	38.57	2	2	0	2.1	10	10	10	5	2
Shohei Ohtani	0	1	37.80	2	2	0	1.2	3	7	7	8	3
José Rodríguez	0	0	0.00	1	0	0	1.2	2	0	0	1	0
Dillon Peters	0	0	16.20	1	1	0	1.2	3	4	3	0	2
Anthony Bemboom	0	0	0.00	1	0	0	1.0	0	0	0	1	0
Team totals	26	34	5.09	60	60	12	525.1	492	321	297	199	523

== Farm system ==
Level	Team	League	Manager
AAA	Salt Lake Bees	Pacific Coast League	
AA	Rocket City Trash Pandas	Southern League	
A-Advanced	Inland Empire 66ers	California League	
A	Burlington Bees	Midwest League	
Rookie	Orem Owlz	Pioneer League	
Rookie	AZL Angels	Arizona League	
Rookie	DSL Angels	Dominican Summer League	

All coaches and rosters can be found on each team's website.

== See also ==
- Los Angeles Angels
- Angel Stadium

Records
Preceded by 2019	Los Angeles Angels seasons 2020	Succeeded by 2021
