= 2020 Oakland Athletics season =

2020 Oakland Athletics
- American League West champions
- League: American League
- Division: West
- Ballpark: Oakland Coliseum
- City: Oakland, California
- Record: 36–24 (.600)
- Divisional place: 1st
- Owners: John Fisher
- General managers: David Forst
- Managers: Bob Melvin
- Television: NBC Sports California (Glen Kuiper, Ken Korach, Vince Cotroneo, Ray Fosse, Mark Mulder, Eric Chavez, Shooty Babitt, Dallas Braden)
- Radio: KNEW (July 30 onward) (Ken Korach, Vince Cotroneo, Ray Fosse, Coco Crisp)

The 2020 Oakland Athletics season was the 120th season for the Oakland Athletics franchise, all as members of the American League, and their 53rd season in Oakland. The season saw the Athletics win the American League West for the first time since 2013.

On March 12, 2020, MLB announced that because of the COVID-19 pandemic, the start of the regular season would be delayed by at least two weeks in addition to the remainder of spring training being cancelled. Four days later, it was announced that the start of the season would be pushed back indefinitely due to the recommendation made by the CDC to restrict events of more than 50 people for eight weeks. On June 23, commissioner Rob Manfred unilaterally implemented a 60-game season. Players reported to training camps on July 1 in order to resume spring training and prepare for a July 24 Opening Day.

The A's hit two walk-off grand slams in their first 11 games of the season. They became the 17th team to hit two walk-off slams in the same year, the third team to hit two in an 11-game span and the fastest to do so from the start of the season.

On September 21, 2020, the A's clinched the American League West championship and then defeated the Chicago White Sox in three games in the 2020 American League Wild Card Series. This was the A's first postseason series victory since 2006, and they won their first winner-take-all postseason game since Game 7 of the 1973 World Series (snapping an MLB record nine-game losing streak in such contests). However, they lost to the Houston Astros in the 2020 American League Division Series.

The 2020 season was the Athletics' most recent postseason appearance. This was also the final postseason appearance as the Oakland Athletics, considering the team left Oakland after the 2024 season and has since rebranded as just "Athletics" on November 4, 2024.

== Offseason ==
=== Rule changes ===
For the 2020 season, MLB instituted several new rule changes including the following:

- Single trade deadline – there will no longer be a waiver trade deadline later in the year.
- 26-man roster – rosters will expand from 25 players, but no team may carry more than 13 pitchers.
- Three-batter minimum for pitchers - a pitcher must face three batters in a game before they can be removed unless there is an injury or the end of an inning.

Further rule changes came into effect in response to the COVID-19 pandemic including the use of the DH in the National League, a shortened schedule, and starting extra innings with a runner at second base.

== Regular season ==
=== Standings ===
AL West
Team	W	L	Pct.	GB	Home	Road
Oakland Athletics	36	24	.600	—	22‍–‍10	14‍–‍14
Houston Astros	29	31	.483	7	20‍–‍9	9‍–‍22
Seattle Mariners	27	33	.450	9	14‍–‍10	13‍–‍23
Los Angeles Angels	26	34	.433	10	16‍–‍15	10‍–‍19
Texas Rangers	22	38	.367	14	16‍–‍14	6‍–‍24

Division leaders
Team	W	L	Pct.
Tampa Bay Rays	40	20	.667
Oakland Athletics	36	24	.600
Minnesota Twins	36	24	.600

Division 2nd place
Team	W	L	Pct.
Cleveland Indians	35	25	.583
New York Yankees	33	27	.550
Houston Astros	29	31	.483

Wild Card teams (Top 2 teams qualify for postseason)
Team	W	L	Pct.	GB
Chicago White Sox	35	25	.583	+3
Toronto Blue Jays	32	28	.533	—
Seattle Mariners	27	33	.450	5
Los Angeles Angels	26	34	.433	6
Kansas City Royals	26	34	.433	6
Baltimore Orioles	25	35	.417	7
Boston Red Sox	24	36	.400	8
Detroit Tigers	23	35	.397	8
Texas Rangers	22	38	.367	10

=== Record against opponents ===
2020 American League record Source: MLB Standings Grid – 2020
Team	**HOU**	**LAA**	**OAK**	**SEA**	**TEX**	NL
Houston	—	4–6	3–7	7–3	5–5	10–10
Los Angeles	6–4	—	4–6	5–5	4–6	7–13
Oakland	7–3	6–4	—	6–4	7–3	10–10
Seattle	3–7	5–5	4–6	—	8–2	7–13
Texas	5–5	6–4	3–7	2–8	—	6–14

=== Game log ===
2020 Game Log
Total: 36–24 (Home: 21–9; Away: 15–15)
July: 3–4 (Home: 3–3; Away: 0–1)

#	Date	Opponent	Score	Win	Loss	Save	Record	Streak
1	July 24	Angels	7–3 (10)	**Smith** (1–0)	Robles (0–1)	—	1–0	W1
2	July 25	Angels	1–4	Bundy (1–0)	**Manaea** (0–1)	Robles (1)	1–1	L1
3	July 26	Angels	6–4	**Petit** (1–0)	Ohtani (0–1)	**Hendriks** (1)	2–1	W1
4	July 27	Angels	3–0	**Smith** (2–0)	Canning (0–1)	**Soria** (1)	3–1	W2
5	July 28	Rockies	3–8	Senzatela (1–0)	**Mengden** (0–1)	—	3–2	L1
6	July 29	Rockies	1–5	Márquez (1–1)	**Montas** (0–1)	—	3–3	L2
7	July 31	@ Mariners	3–5	Walker (1–1)	**Manaea** (0–2)	Williams (2)	3–4	L3

August: 19–8 (Home: 10–1; Away: 9–7)

#	Date	Opponent	Score	Win	Loss	Save	Record	Streak
8	August 1	@ Mariners	3–2 (10)	**Soria** (1–0)	Altavilla (1–1)	**Hendriks** (2)	4–4	W1
9	August 2	@ Mariners	3–2	**Bassitt** (1–0)	Graveman (0–2)	**Hendriks** (3)	5–4	W2
10	August 3	@ Mariners	11–1	**Montas** (1–1)	Sheffield (0–2)	—	6–4	W3
11	August 4	Rangers	5–1	**Hendriks** (1–0)	Vólquez (0–1)	—	7–4	W4
12	August 5	Rangers	6–4	**McFarland** (1–0)	Gibaut (0–1)	**Soria** (2)	8–4	W5
13	August 6	Rangers	6–4	**Fiers** (1–0)	Minor (0–3)	**Hendriks** (4)	9–4	W6
14	August 7	Astros	3–2 (13)	**Wendelken** (1–0)	Sneed (0–1)	—	10–4	W7
15	August 8	Astros	3–1	**Montas** (2–1)	Valdez (0–2)	**Hendriks** (5)	11–4	W8
16	August 9	Astros	7–2	**Luzardo** (1–0)	Javier (1–1)	**Smith** (1)	12–4	W9
17	August 10	@ Angels	9–10	Peña (1–0)	**Petit** (1–1)	Buttrey (2)	12–5	L1
18	August 11	@ Angels	0–6	Bundy (3–1)	**Fiers** (1–1)	—	12–6	L2
19	August 12	@ Angels	8–4	**Bassitt** (2–0)	Canning (0–3)	—	13–6	W1
20	August 14	@ Giants	8–7 (10)	**Soria** (2–0)	García (0–1)	**Hendriks** (6)	14–6	W2
21	August 15	@ Giants	7–6	**McFarland** (2–0)	Gott (1–1)	**Hendriks** (7)	15–6	W3
22	August 16	@ Giants	15–3	**Fiers** (2–1)	Webb (1–2)	—	16–6	W4
23	August 17	@ Diamondbacks	3–4	Crichton (2–0)	**Soria** (2–1)	—	16–7	L1
24	August 18	@ Diamondbacks	1–10	Weaver (1–3)	**Montas** (2–2)	—	16–8	L2
25	August 19	Diamondbacks	4–1	**Luzardo** (2–0)	Kelly (3–2)	**Hendriks** (8)	17–8	W1
26	August 20	Diamondbacks	5–1	**Manaea** (1–2)	Young (1–1)	—	18–8	W2
27	August 21	Angels	5–3	**Fiers** (3–1)	Heaney (1–2)	**Hendriks** (9)	19–8	W3
28	August 22	Angels	3–4	Andriese (1–1)	**Bassitt** (2–1)	Buttrey (3)	19–9	L1
29	August 23	Angels	5–4 (10)	**Hendriks** (2–0)	Buttrey (1–1)	—	20–9	W1
30	August 24	@ Rangers	2–3	Lynn (4–0)	**Luzardo** (2–1)	Montero (6)	20–10	L1
31	August 25	@ Rangers	10–3	**Manaea** (2–2)	Gibson (1–3)	—	21–10	W1
32	August 26	@ Rangers	3–1	**Fiers** (4–1)	Allard (0–3)	**Hendriks** (10)	22–10	W2
—	August 27	@ Rangers	Postponed (strikes due to shooting of Jacob Blake); Makeup: September 12					
—	August 28	@ Astros	Postponed (strikes due to Jacob Blake shooting); Makeup: August 29					
33	August 29 (1)	@ Astros	2–4 (7)	McCullers Jr. (3–2)	**Bassitt** (2–2)	Pressly (5)	22–11	L1
34	August 29 (2)	@ Astros	3–6 (7)	Greinke (2–0)	**Montas** (2–3)	Pressly (6)	22–12	L2
—	August 30	@ Astros	Postponed (COVID-19); Makeup: September 8					

September: 14–12 (Home: 8–5; Away: 6–7)

#	Date	Opponent	Score	Win	Loss	Save	Record	Streak
—	September 1	@ Mariners	Postponed (COVID-19); Makeup: September 14					
—	September 2	@ Mariners	Postponed (COVID-19); Makeup: September 14					
—	September 3	@ Mariners	Postponed (COVID-19); Makeup: September 26					
35	September 4	Padres	0–7	Davies (6–2)	**Luzardo** (2–2)	—	22–13	L3
36	September 5	Padres	8–4	**Manaea** (3–2)	Paddack (3–4)	—	23–13	W1
37	September 6	Padres	3–5	Richards (2–2)	**Fiers** (4–2)	Rosenthal (8)	23–14	L1
38	September 7	Astros	6–0	**Bassitt** (3–2)	Javier (4–2)	—	24–14	W1
39	September 8 (1)	@ Astros	4–2 (7)	**Montas** (3–3)	Greinke (3–1)	**Hendriks** (11)	25–14	W2
40	September 8 (2)	Astros	4–5 (7)	Paredes (2–2)	**Wendelken** (1–1)	Pressly (8)	25–15	L1
41	September 9	Astros	3–2	**Hendriks** (3–0)	Pressly (1–2)	—	26–15	W1
42	September 10	Astros	3–1	**Manaea** (4–2)	Urquidy (0–1)	**Hendriks** (12)	27–15	W2
43	September 11	@ Rangers	10–6	**Fiers** (5–2)	García (0–2)	—	28–15	W3
44	September 12 (1)	@ Rangers	2–5 (7)	Benjamin (1–0)	**Jefferies** (0–1)	Montero (8)	28–16	L1
45	September 12 (2)	@ Rangers	10–1	**Bassitt** (4–2)	Allard (0–6)	—	29–16	W1
46	September 13	@ Rangers	3–6	Lynn (6–2)	**Montas** (3–4)	—	29–17	L1
47	September 14 (1)	@ Mariners	5–6 (7)	Gonzales (6–2)	**Soria** (2–2)	Hirano (2)	29–18	L2
48	September 14 (2)	@ Mariners	9–0 (7)	**Minor** (1–5)	Yacabonis (0–1)	—	30–18	W1
49	September 15	@ Rockies	1–3	Senzatela (4–2)	**Manaea** (4–3)	—	30–19	L1
50	September 16	@ Rockies	3–1	**Fiers** (6–2)	Márquez (2–6)	**Hendriks** (13)	31–19	W1
51	September 18	Giants	6–0	**Bassitt** (5–2)	Webb (2–4)	—	32–19	W2
52	September 19	Giants	6–0	**Luzardo** (3–2)	Gausman (3–3)	—	33–19	W3
53	September 20	Giants	2–14	Anderson (3–3)	**Minor** (1–6)	—	33–20	L1
54	September 22	@ Dodgers	2–7	May (2–1)	**Montas** (3–5)	—	33–21	L2
55	September 23	@ Dodgers	6–4	**Diekman** (1–0)	Treinen (3–3)	**Hendriks** (14)	34–21	W1
56	September 24	@ Dodgers	1–5	Floro (3–0)	**Fiers** (6–3)	—	34–22	L1
57	September 25	Mariners	3–1 (10)	**Diekman** (2–0)	Gerber (1–1)	—	35–22	W1
58	September 26 (1)	Mariners	1–5 (8)	Graveman (1–3)	**Hendriks** (3–1)	—	35–23	L1
59	September 26 (2)	@ Mariners	3–12 (7)	Dunn (4–1)	**Blackburn** (0–1)	—	35–24	L2
60	September 27	Mariners	6–2	**Petit** (2–1)	Hirano (0–1)	—	36–24	W1

Legend: = Win = Loss = Postponement
Bold = Athletics team member

== Roster ==
2020 Oakland Athletics
Roster
Pitchers: 40 Chris Bassitt; 58 Paul Blackburn; 35 Jake Diekman; 50 Mike Fiers; 16 Liam Hendriks; 60 Daulton Jefferies; 56 James Kaprielian; 44 Jesús Luzardo; 55 Sean Manaea; 38 T. J. McFarland; 33 Daniel Mengden; 23 Mike Minor; 47 Frankie Montas; 36 Yusmeiro Petit; 46 Burch Smith; 48 Joakim Soria; 62 Lou Trivino; 70 Jordan Weems; 57 J. B. Wendelken	Catchers: 30 Austin Allen; 37 Jonah Heim; 12 Sean Murphy; Infielders: 4 Franklin Barreto; 15 Seth Brown; 26 Matt Chapman; 5 Tony Kemp; 4 Jake Lamb; 3 Tommy La Stella; 39 Vimael Machín; 28 Matt Olson; 45 Nate Orf; 18 Chad Pinder; 10 Marcus Semien	Outfielders: 20 Mark Canha; 8 Robbie Grossman; 22 Ramón Laureano; 25 Stephen Piscotty; Other batters: 2 Khris Davis	Manager: 6 Bob Melvin; Coaches: 17 Mike Aldrete (first base); 51 Darren Bush (hitting); 29 Ryan Christenson (bench); 14 Scott Emerson (pitching); 91 Dustin Hughes (bullpen catcher); 59 Marcus Jensen (bullpen/catching); 7 Mark Kotsay (quality control); 52 Eric Martins (assistant hitting); 41 Al Pedrique (third base); 88 Philip Pohl (bullpen catcher)

== Player stats ==
=== Batting ===
Note: G = Games played; AB = At bats; R = Runs; H = Hits; 2B = Doubles; 3B = Triples; HR = Home runs; RBI = Runs batted in; SB = Stolen bases; BB = Walks; AVG = Batting average; SLG = Slugging average

Player	G	AB	R	H	2B	3B	HR	RBI	SB	BB	AVG	SLG
Marcus Semien	53	211	28	47	9	1	7	23	4	25	.223	.374
Matt Olson	60	210	28	41	4	1	14	42	1	34	.195	.424
Mark Canha	59	191	32	47	12	2	5	33	4	37	.246	.408
Ramón Laureano	54	183	27	39	8	1	6	25	2	24	.213	.366
Robbie Grossman	51	166	23	40	12	2	8	23	8	21	.241	.482
Stephen Piscotty	45	159	17	36	6	0	5	29	4	9	.226	.358
Matt Chapman	37	142	22	33	9	2	10	25	0	8	.232	.535
Sean Murphy	43	116	21	27	5	0	7	14	0	24	.233	.457
Tommy La Stella	27	97	16	28	6	2	1	11	0	12	.289	.423
Tony Kemp	49	93	15	23	5	0	0	4	3	15	.247	.301
Khris Davis	30	85	9	17	5	0	2	10	0	10	.200	.329
Vimael Machín	24	63	11	13	2	0	0	0	0	8	.206	.238
Chad Pinder	24	56	8	13	3	0	2	8	0	5	.232	.393
Jake Lamb	13	45	5	12	4	0	3	9	0	2	.267	.556
Jonah Heim	13	38	5	8	0	0	0	5	0	3	.211	.211
Austin Allen	14	31	1	6	1	0	1	3	0	1	.194	.323
Franklin Barreto	15	10	5	0	0	0	0	0	0	0	.000	.000
Nate Orf	6	7	1	0	0	0	0	0	0	0	.000	.000
Seth Brown	7	5	0	0	0	0	0	0	0	0	.000	.000
Team totals	60	1908	274	430	91	11	71	264	26	238	.225	.396

=== Pitching ===
Note: W = Wins; L = Losses; ERA = Earned run average; G = Games pitched; GS = Games started; SV = Saves; IP = Innings pitched; H = Hits allowed; R = Runs allowed; ER = Earned runs allowed; BB = Walks allowed; SO = Strikeouts

Player	W	L	ERA	G	GS	SV	IP	H	R	ER	BB	SO
Chris Bassitt	5	2	2.29	11	11	0	63.0	56	18	16	17	55
Mike Fiers	6	3	4.58	11	11	0	59.0	65	31	30	16	37
Jesús Luzardo	3	2	4.12	12	9	0	59.0	58	27	27	17	59
Sean Manaea	4	3	4.50	11	11	0	54.0	57	32	27	8	45
Frankie Montas	3	5	5.60	11	11	0	53.0	57	35	33	23	60
Liam Hendriks	3	1	1.78	24	0	14	25.1	14	6	5	3	37
J. B. Wendelken	1	1	1.80	21	0	0	25.0	17	8	5	11	31
Lou Trivino	0	0	3.86	20	0	0	23.1	16	10	10	10	26
Joakim Soria	2	2	2.82	22	0	2	22.1	18	8	7	10	24
Yusmeiro Petit	2	1	1.66	26	0	0	21.2	19	4	4	5	17
Mike Minor	1	1	5.48	5	4	0	21.1	15	13	13	7	27
Jake Diekman	2	0	0.42	21	0	0	21.1	8	2	1	12	31
T. J. McFarland	2	0	4.35	23	0	0	20.2	26	10	10	5	9
Jordan Weems	0	0	3.21	9	0	0	14.0	10	5	5	7	18
Daniel Mengden	0	1	3.65	4	1	0	12.1	14	5	5	7	10
Burch Smith	2	0	2.25	6	0	1	12.0	7	3	3	1	13
James Kaprielian	0	0	7.36	2	0	0	3.2	4	3	3	2	4
Paul Blackburn	0	1	27.00	1	1	0	2.1	5	7	7	2	2
Daulton Jeffries	0	1	22.50	1	1	0	2.0	5	5	5	2	1
Team totals	36	24	3.77	60	60	17	515.1	471	232	216	165	506

== Postseason ==
=== Game log ===
2020 Postseason Game Log: 3–4
American League Wild Card Series: 2–1

#	Date	Opponent	Score	Win	Loss	Save	Recap
1	September 29	White Sox	1–4	Giolito (1–0)	Luzardo (0–1)	Colomé (1)	0–1
2	September 30	White Sox	5–3	Bassitt (1–0)	Keuchel (0–1)	Diekman (1)	1–1
3	October 1	White Sox	6–4	Montas (1–0)	Marshall (0–1)	Hendriks (1)	2–1

American League Division Series: 1–3

#	Date	Opponent	Score	Win	Loss	Save	Recap
1	October 5	Astros	5–10	Taylor (1–0)	Wendelken (0–1)	—	0–1
2	October 6	Astros	2–5	Valdez (1–0)	Manaea (0–1)	Pressly (1)	0–2
3	October 7	@ Astros	9–7	Hendriks (1–0)	Raley (0–1)	—	1–2
4	October 8	@ Astros	6–11	Javier (1–0)	Montas (0–1)	—	1–3

all games played at Dodger Stadium in Los Angeles, CA

=== Wild Card Series ===
The A's hosted the Chicago White Sox at the Oakland Coliseum in the Wild Card series.

==== Game 1 ====
Rookie left hander Jesús Luzardo got the ball for Game 1 against White Sox ace Lucas Giolito. Outfielder Adam Engel got the scoring started with a solo home run. MVP candidate José Abreu added a 2-run home run. Meanwhile, Giolito carried a perfect game into the 7th inning before giving up a leadoff single to Tommy La Stella. Giolito would end up going 7+ innings, allowing 1 run. Yasmani Grandal added a solo home run in the 8th. A's outfielder Ramón Laureano grounded into a force play to make it 4–1 before White Sox closer Álex Colomé shut the door in the 9th inning.

==== Game 2 ====
A's ace Chris Bassitt got the ball for Game 2 against White Sox lefty Dallas Keuchel. The A's got ahead early with an fielding error from White Sox 2nd baseman Nick Madrigal that scored 2 runs. A's shortstop Marcus Semien added a 2-run home run in the 2nd and A's DH Khris Davis added a solo home run in the 4th inning, chasing Keuchel from the game after 3 1/3. Bassitt would pitch 7 1/3, allowing 1 run. Grandal hit his 2nd home run of the series off A's closer Liam Hendriks and Grandal would bring in a run via a bases loaded walk. Diekman replaced Hendriks and got Jose Abreu to ground out to tie the series and send the series to a winner-take-all Game 3.

==== Game 3 ====
The A's sent out right hander Mike Fiers, while the White Sox counted with righty Dane Dunning. The White Sox struck first on a monster home run from rookie Luis Robert. The White Sox added two more runs in the 3rd inning on an RBI single from Robert and an RBI double from Nomar Mazara. The A's got back into the game with a 2-run home run from rookie catcher Sean Murphy, then back 2 back bases loaded walks gave the A's the lead, 4–3. The White Sox tied the game on an RBI single from Mazara. The A's added insurance in the 6th with a 2-run single from utility player Chad Pinder. A's closer Liam Hendriks, who threw 49 pitches in Game 2, pitched around a leadoff single from White Sox catcher James McCann, striking out Yoan Moncada, Robert & Mazara to send the A's to the ALDS against the Houston Astros.

=== ALDS ===
The A's lost to their division rivals, the Houston Astros in the ALDS.

==== Game 1 ====
The A's announced that ace Chris Bassitt would get the ball for Game 1 against right hander Lance McCullers Jr. A's DH Khris Davis got the scoring started with a 2-run home run in the 2nd inning, followed by a Sean Murphy solo shot in the 3rd inning. The Astros responded with a solo home run from Alex Bregman and a game-tying home run from Carlos Correa in the top of the 4th. The A's responded quickly with a solo shot from Matt Olson to put the A's back in front, 4–3. A Mark Canha sacrifice fly extended the A's lead to 5–3. Both starters went 4 innings. The Astros took the lead in the 6th inning when Josh Reddick reached on a fielding error with 2 outs, Martín Maldonado singled, George Springer doubled in Reddick, Jose Altuve doubled in both Maldonado & Springer & Michael Brantley singled in Altuve to make it 7–5. Correa hit his 2nd home run of the game to make it 8–5. The Astros broke it open in the 9th inning with a Correa RBI single & a Yuli Gurriel sacrifice fly. Ryan Pressly worked a 1-2-3 9th inning to seal the Game 1 victory for the Astros.

==== Game 2 ====
Left handed pitcher Sean Manaea will get the ball, he will be opposed by Astros lefty Framber Valdez. A's DH Khris Davis hit another home run to give the A's the lead in the 2nd inning. The Astros fought back and took the lead when George Springer hit a 2-run home run. The Astros added another run on an RBI groundout. The A's would strike back with a Chad Pinder solo home run in the 4th inning. Martín Maldonado & Springer went back-to-back in the 5th inning. Both pitching staffs then held the game scoreless after that. With Astros closer Ryan Pressly picking up the save, the A's were put in an 0–2 ALDS hole.

==== Game 3 ====
Astros manager Dusty Baker announced that right hander José Urquidy will get the ball for Game 3, while the A's will give the ball to lefty Jesús Luzardo. A's second baseman Tommy La Stella got the scoring started with a solo home run in the first inning. The Astros responded with a solo home run from Jose Altuve and an RBI groundout to take the lead. The A's responded again with a solo home run from left fielder Mark Canha. The A's took the lead in the 4th inning on an Olson solo home run. The A's would add another home run with a Marcus Semien solo shot. The Astros tied it in the bottom of the 5th inning with an Aledmys Díaz 2-run home run. The Astros would regain the lead with a Michael Brantley RBI single, an Alex Bregman RBI double and a Kyle Tucker RBI single. The A's would tie in the top of the 7th on a Pinder 3-run home run. The A's would add two sacrifice flies in the 8th inning to cap the scoring. A's closer Liam Hendriks pitched 3 scoreless innings to save the A's season and send the series to a Game 4.

==== Game 4 ====
The A's started Frankie Montas while the Astros started Zack Greinke. A's outfielder Ramón Laureano got the scoring started with a 3-run home run. The Astros responded in the 4th inning with a 2-run home run from Astros DH Michael Brantley and a 3-run home run from Astros shortstop Carlos Correa. The A's responded in the 5th inning with another home run from Laureano that chased Greinke from the game. Lefty Blake Taylor came in and got the final out of the 5th inning. In the bottom of the 5th, Brantley hit his 2nd home run of the game and Correa added an RBI single to make it 7–4 Astros. In the 6th inning, Astros outfielder Kyle Tucker added an RBI single followed by another single for Correa that made it 9–4. Astros 2nd baseman Jose Altuve hit a 2-run home run to make it 11–4 Astros. Astros pitcher Cristian Javier pitched 2 1/3 scoreless innings. A's shortstop Marcus Semien got an RBI single & A's 2nd baseman Tommy La Stella singled in Semien before Astros closer then shut the door in the 9th inning to send the Astros to the ALCS and eliminate the A's

=== Postseason rosters ===
Playoff rosters
American League Wild Card Series

- Pitchers: 16 Liam Hendriks 23 Mike Minor 35 Jake Diekman 36 Yusmeiro Petit 38 T. J. McFarland 40 Chris Bassitt 44 Jesús Luzardo 47 Frankie Montas 48 Joakim Soria 50 Mike Fiers 55 Sean Manaea 57 J. B. Wendelken 62 Lou Trivino
- Catchers: 12 Sean Murphy 37 Jonah Heim
- Infielders: 3 Tommy La Stella 4 Jake Lamb 5 Tony Kemp 10 Marcus Semien 18 Chad Pinder 28 Matt Olson 39 Vimael Machín 46 Nate Orf
- Outfielders: 8 Robbie Grossman 20 Mark Canha 22 Ramón Laureano 25 Stephen Piscotty
- Designated hitters: 2 Khris Davis

American League Division Series

- Pitchers: 16 Liam Hendriks 23 Mike Minor 35 Jake Diekman 36 Yusmeiro Petit 38 T. J. McFarland 40 Chris Bassitt 44 Jesús Luzardo 47 Frankie Montas 48 Joakim Soria 50 Mike Fiers 55 Sean Manaea 57 J. B. Wendelken 62 Lou Trivino 70 Jordan Weems
- Catchers: 12 Sean Murphy 37 Jonah Heim
- Infielders: 3 Tommy La Stella 4 Jake Lamb 5 Tony Kemp 10 Marcus Semien 18 Chad Pinder 28 Matt Olson 46 Nate Orf
- Outfielders: 8 Robbie Grossman 20 Mark Canha 22 Ramón Laureano 25 Stephen Piscotty
- Designated hitters: 2 Khris Davis

== Farm system ==
Level	Team	League	Manager
AAA	Las Vegas Aviators	Pacific Coast League	
AA	Midland RockHounds	Texas League	
A-Advanced	Stockton Ports	California League	
A	Beloit Snappers	Midwest League	
A-Short Season	Vermont Lake Monsters	New York–Penn League	
Rookie	AZL Athletics	Arizona League	
Rookie	DSL Athletics	Dominican Summer League	
