= List of Athletics no-hitters =

The Athletics are a Major League Baseball franchise based in West Sacramento, California. They play in the American League West division. Also known previously as the Philadelphia Athletics (1901–1954), the Kansas City Athletics (1954–1967), and the Oakland Athletics (1968–2024), pitchers for the Athletics have thrown thirteen no-hitters in franchise history, five during the Philadelphia era and eight during the Oakland era, but none during the Kansas City era. A no-hitter is officially recognized by Major League Baseball only "when a pitcher (or pitchers) allows no hits during the entire course of a game, which consists of at least nine innings", though one or more batters "may reach base via a walk, an error, a hit by pitch, a passed ball or wild pitch on strike three, or catcher's interference". No-hitters of less than nine complete innings were previously recognized by the league as official; however, several rule alterations in 1991 changed the rule to its current form. Two perfect games, a special subcategory of no-hitter, have been pitched in Athletics history. As defined by Major League Baseball, "in a perfect game, no batter reaches any base during the course of the game." These feats were achieved by Catfish Hunter in 1968, which was the first perfect game in American League history since 1922, and Dallas Braden in 2010, which was the second perfect game in the majors – both against the same team – in ten months.

Weldon Henley threw the first no-hitter in Athletics history on July 22, 1905; the most recent no hitter was thrown by Mike Fiers on May 7, 2019. Only three left-handed pitchers have thrown no-hitters in franchise history and the other nine pitchers were right-handed. Vida Blue is the only pitcher in Athletics history to have thrown more than one no-hitter in an Athletics uniform, include the starting pitcher in a combined no-hitter. Nine no-hitters were thrown at home and three on the road. They threw four in May, one in June, one in July, one in August, and five in September. The longest interval between no-hitters was between the games pitched by Bullet Joe Bush and Fowler, encompassing 29 years and 14 days from August 26, 1916, till September 9, 1945. Conversely, the shortest interval between no-hitters was between the games pitched by Sean Manaea and Mike Fiers, encompassing merely 1 year and 16 days from April 21, 2018, till May 7, 2019. The Athletics have no-hit the Minnesota Twins (formerly "Washington Senators") most often: three times by McCahan (in 1947), Hunter (in 1968), and Vida Blue (in 1970). None of those no-hitters saw the Athletics allow a run through a combination of errors, walks, hit by pitch or catcher’s interference. The most baserunners allowed in a no-hitter was by Bush (in 1916), who allowed five. Of the thirteen no-hitters, three have been won by a score of 3–0, more common than any other results. The largest margin of victory in a no-hitter were 6–0 wins by Henley in 1905 and Blue in 1970. The smallest margin of victory was a 1–0 win by Dick Fowler in 1945.

The umpire is also an integral part of any no-hitter. The task of the umpire in a baseball game is to make any decision “which involves judgment, such as, but not limited to, whether a batted ball is fair or foul, whether a pitch is a strike or a ball, or whether a runner is safe or out… [the umpire’s judgment on such matters] is final.” Part of the duties of the umpire making calls at home plate includes defining the strike zone, which “is defined as that area over homeplate (sic) the upper limit of which is a horizontal line at the midpoint between the top of the shoulders and the top of the uniform pants, and the lower level is a line at the hollow beneath the kneecap.” These calls define every baseball game and are therefore integral to the completion of any no-hitter. A different umpire presided over each of the Athletics’ twelve no-hitters.

The manager is another integral part of any no-hitter. The tasks of the manager is to determine the starting rotation as well as batting order and defensive lineup every game. Managers choosing the right pitcher and right defensive lineup at a right game at a right place at a right time would contribute to a no-hitter. Eight different managers, such as Connie Mack who managed the team for 50 years, have involved in the Athletics’ twelve no-hitters.

== List of no-hitters in Athletics history ==
| ¶ | Indicates a perfect game |
| £ | Pitcher was left-handed |
| * | Member of the National Baseball Hall of Fame and Museum |

| # | Date | Pitcher | Final score | Base- runners | Opponent | Catcher | Plate umpire | Manager | Notes | Ref |
|---|---|---|---|---|---|---|---|---|---|---|
| 1 | July 22, 1905 | Weldon Henley | 6–0 | 4 | @ St. Louis Browns | Ossee Schreck | Silk O'Laughlin | Connie Mack (1) | First game of a doubleheader; First no-hitter in franchise history; First Athletics no-hitter on the road; First right-handed pitcher to throw a no-hitter in franchise history; Largest margin of victory in an Athletics no-hitter (tie) | |
| 2 | May 12, 1910 | Chief Bender* | 4–0 | 1 | Cleveland Naps | Jack Lapp | Bill Dinneen | Connie Mack (2) | First Athletics no-hitter at home | |
| 3 | August 26, 1916 | Bullet Joe Bush | 5–0 | 5 | Cleveland Indians | Val Picinich | Tommy Connolly | Connie Mack (3) | Most baserunners allowed in an Athletics no-hitter | |
| 4 | September 9, 1945 | Dick Fowler | 1–0 | 4 | St. Louis Browns | Buddy Rosar (1) | George Pipgras | Connie Mack (4) | Second game of a doubleheader; Smallest margin of victory in an Athletics no-hitter; Longest interval between Athletics no-hitters | |
| 5 | September 3, 1947 | Bill McCahan | 3–0 | 1 | Washington Senators | Buddy Rosar (2) | Art Passarella | Connie Mack (5) | Only baserunner came on 1B Ferris Fain's error with one out in the 2nd; Last no-hitter as Philadelphia Athletic | |
| 6 | May 8, 1968 | Catfish Hunter*^{¶} | 4–0 | 0 | Minnesota Twins | Jim Pagliaroni | Jerry Neudecker | Bob Kennedy | First perfect game in Athletics history and 9th in MLB history; first perfect game in American League history since 1922; Hunter batted in three of Oakland’s four runs; First no-hitter as Oakland Athletic; See also: Catfish Hunter's perfect game | |
| 7 | September 21, 1970 | Vida Blue^{£} (1) | 6–0 | 1 | Minnesota Twins | Gene Tenace (1) | Larry Barnett | John McNamara | Largest margin of victory in an Athletics no-hitter (tie); All four no-hitters of 1970 had been pitched in California | |
| 8 | September 28, 1975 | Vida Blue^{£} (2) (5 IP); Glenn Abbott (1 IP); Paul Lindblad^{£} (1 IP); Rollie Fingers* (2 IP) | 5–0 | 3 | @ California Angels | Gene Tenace (2) (6 IP); Ray Fosse (3 IP) | Bill Kunkel | Al Dark | Final day of the regular season | |
| 9 | September 29, 1983 | Mike Warren | 3–0 | 3 | Chicago White Sox | Mike Heath | Marty Springstead | Steve Boros | Latest calendar date of Athletics no-hitter | |
| 10 | June 29, 1990 | Dave Stewart | 5–0 | 3 | @ Toronto Blue Jays | Terry Steinbach | Drew Coble | Tony La Russa | First of two no-hitters thrown on the same day | |
| 11 | May 9, 2010 | Dallas Braden^{£¶} | 4–0 | 0 | Tampa Bay Rays | Landon Powell | Jim Wolf | Bob Geren | Mother's Day; Second perfect game in Athletics history and 19th in MLB history; First of two perfect games in 2010; This was the second perfect game – and second against the Rays – in 12 months; See also: Dallas Braden's perfect game | |
| 12 | April 21, 2018 | Sean Manaea^{£} | 3–0 | 3 | Boston Red Sox | Jonathan Lucroy | Hunter Wendelstedt | Bob Melvin | Second no-hitter in MLB in over 10 months (last was Edinson Vólquez's no-hitter on June 3, 2017) | |
| 13 | May 7, 2019 | Mike Fiers | 2-0 | 3 | Cincinnati Reds | Josh Phegley | Mark Ripperger | Bob Melvin | Shortest interval between Athletics no-hitters; Fourth no-hitter in MLB in over 12 months (last was James Paxton's no-hitter on May 8, 2018); The 300th no-hitter in the history of Major League Baseball; Final no-hitter as the Oakland Athletics | |

== See also ==
- List of Major League Baseball no-hitters
