= Nate Orf =

American baseball player (born 1990)

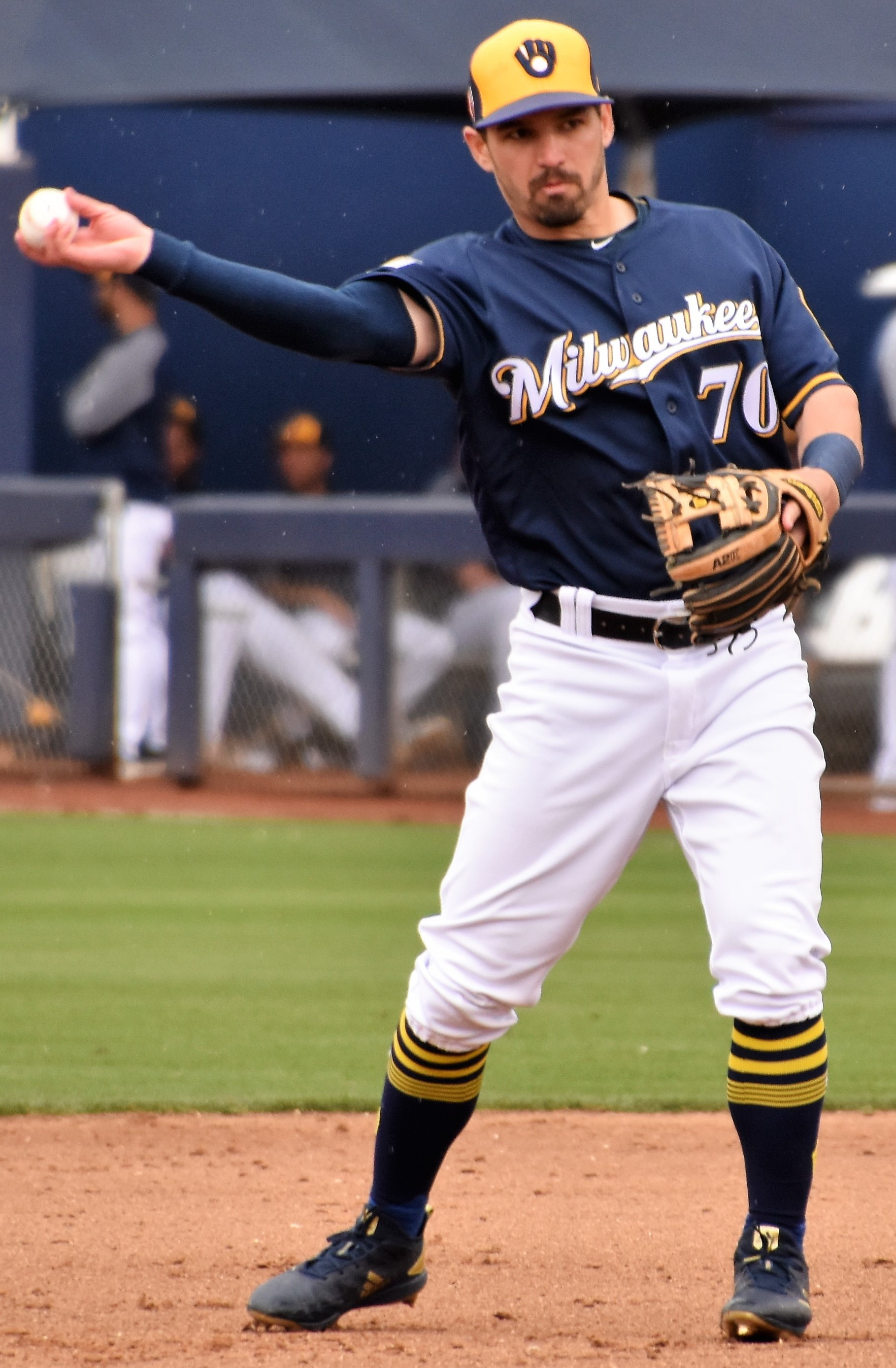
- Orf with the Milwaukee Brewers in 2019
- Infielder
- Born: February 1, 1990 (age 36); Wentzville, Missouri, U.S.
- Batted: Right Threw: Right

MLB debut
- July 2, 2018, for the Milwaukee Brewers

Last MLB appearance
- September 27, 2020, for the Oakland Athletics

MLB statistics
- Batting average: .071
- Home runs: 1
- Runs batted in: 1
- Stats at Baseball Reference

Teams
- Milwaukee Brewers (2018); Oakland Athletics (2020)

Nathan Andrew Orf (born February 1, 1990) is an American former professional baseball infielder. He played in Major League Baseball (MLB) for the Milwaukee Brewers in 2018 and Oakland Athletics in 2020.

== Career ==
Orf played college baseball at the University of Illinois at Chicago for two seasons and then transferred to Baylor University for his final two seasons.

=== Milwaukee Brewers ===
He was signed as an undrafted free agent by the Milwaukee Brewers in 2013.

On August 31, 2014, when he was playing for the Brevard County Manatees, Orf played all nine positions in a game against the Dunedin Blue Jays. He became the first Manatee to ever play all nine positions. The next day, on September 1, Orf was called up to the Huntsville Stars for the playoffs. The Brewers promoted him to the major leagues on July 2, 2018. Orf's first major league hit, a home run, came on July 4 at home against the Minnesota Twins pitcher José Berríos. After the home run, Orf was carried out of the dugout by his teammates for a curtain call. He was outrighted off the major league roster on August 31.

Orf spent the 2019 campaign with the Triple–A San Antonio Missions, playing in 125 games and slashing .272/.399/.410 with a career–high 11 home runs, 54 RBI, and 11 stolen bases. He elected free agency following the season on November 4, 2019.

=== Oakland Athletics ===
On November 25, 2019, Orf signed a minor league contract, with an invite to major league spring training, with the Oakland Athletics. On September 13, 2020, Orf was selected to the major league roster. On February 16, 2021, Orf retired from professional baseball.
