= Anderson Tejeda =

Dominican baseball player (born 1998)

- Infielder
- Born: May 1, 1998 (age 27); Baní, Dominican Republic
- Batted: Switch Threw: Right

MLB debut
- August 6, 2020, for the Texas Rangers

Last MLB appearance
- April 16, 2021, for the Texas Rangers

MLB statistics
- Batting average: .220
- Home runs: 3
- Runs batted in: 8
- Stats at Baseball Reference

Teams
- Texas Rangers (2020–2021)

Anderson Alexander Tejeda (born May 1, 1998) is a Dominican former professional baseball infielder. He has previously played in Major League Baseball (MLB) for the Texas Rangers. He made his MLB debut in 2020.

== Career ==
=== Texas Rangers ===
Tejeda signed with the Texas Rangers as an international free agent on September 8, 2014, for a $100,000 signing bonus. Tejeda made his professional debut in 2015 with the DSL Rangers of the Rookie-level Dominican Summer League, hitting .312/.393/.522/.915 with 4 home runs and 40 RBI in 55 games. Tejeda split the 2016 season between the DSL Rangers, AZL Rangers of the Rookie-level Arizona League, and the Spokane Indians of the Class A Short Season Northwest League, hitting a combined .283/.326/.520/.846 with 10 home runs and 47 RBI. Tejeda spent the 2017 season with the Hickory Crawdads of the Class A South Atlantic League, hitting .247/.309/.411/.720 with 8 home runs and 53 RBI in 115 games. Tejeda spent the 2018 season with the Down East Wood Ducks of the Class A-Advanced Carolina League, hitting .259/.331/.439/.770 with 19 home runs and 74 RBI in 121 games. Tejeda was named a mid-season and post-season Carolina League all-star in 2018. Tejeda was ranked as the #83 overall prospect in baseball by Baseball Prospectus in their preseason 2019 Top 101 list.

Prior to the 2019 season, Tejeda a formerly left-handed only batter, became a full-time switch hitter.

Tejeda was assigned back to Down East for the 2019 season, and hit .234/.309/.386/.695 with 4 home runs and 24 RBI in 43 games. Tejeda suffered a subluxed shoulder on May 30, which required surgery in July to repair and missed the rest of the 2019 season.

Tejeda was added to the Rangers 40–man roster following the 2019 season. He made his major league debut on August 6, 2020 against the Oakland Athletics, recording three RBI. In 23 games for Texas in 2020, he hit .253/.273/.453/.726 with 3 home runs and 8 RBI. Between three minor league levels in 2021, he hit .194/.266/.368/.634 with 12 home runs and 33 RBI. In 16 plate appearances with Texas in 2021, Tejeda hit just .063/.118/.063/.180. On November 5, 2021, Tejeda was outrighted off the active roster, and became a minor league free agent.

=== St. Louis Cardinals ===
On November 18, 2021, Tejeda signed a minor league contract with the St. Louis Cardinals. Tejeda was released by the Cardinals organization on April 5, 2022.

=== Charleston Dirty Birds ===
On February 17, 2024, Tejeda signed with the Charleston Dirty Birds of the Atlantic League of Professional Baseball. He was released prior to the start of the season on March 28.
