= Sherten Apostel =

Curaçaoan baseball player (born 1999)

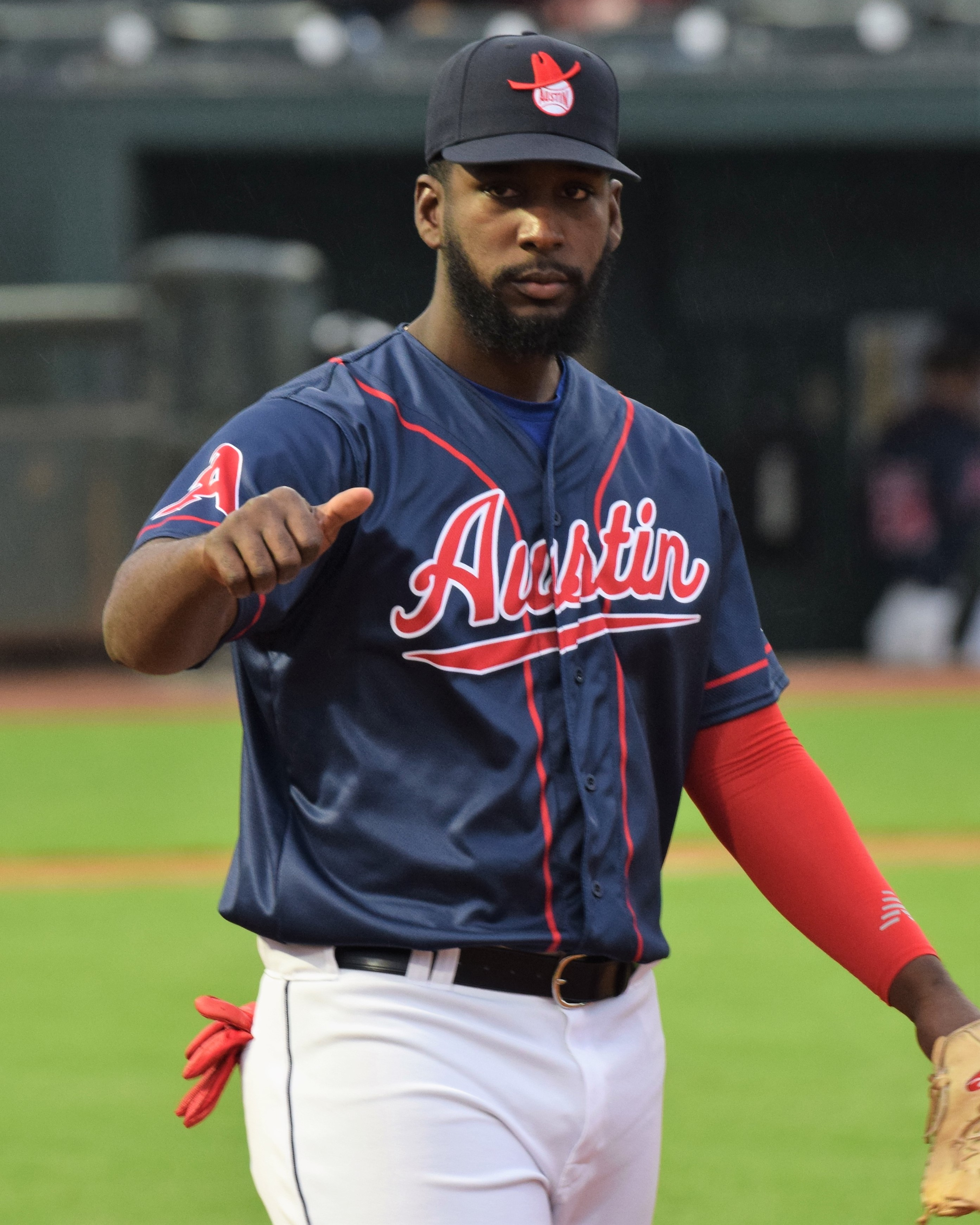
- Apostel with the Round Rock Express in 2022
- Third baseman / First baseman
- Born: March 11, 1999 (age 27); Willemstad, Curaçao
- Batted: Right Threw: Right

MLB debut
- September 12, 2020, for the Texas Rangers

Last MLB appearance
- September 24, 2020, for the Texas Rangers

MLB statistics
- Batting average: .100
- Home runs: 0
- Runs batted in: 0
- Stats at Baseball Reference

Teams
- Texas Rangers (2020)

Sherten Wimbert Ramiro Apostel (born March 11, 1999) is a Curaçaoan professional baseball third baseman and first baseman. He played in Major League Baseball (MLB) for the Texas Rangers in September 2020.

== Career ==
=== Pittsburgh Pirates ===
Apostel signed with the Pittsburgh Pirates as an international free agent in July 2015, for a signing bonus of $200,000. He chose to sign as a third baseman though he also threw a 92 miles per hour (148 km/h) fastball. He made his professional debut in 2016 with the DSL Pirates, hitting .205/.308/.275/.583 with one home run and 8 RBI in 48 games. Apostel returned to the DSL Pirates in 2017, hitting .258/.422/.495/.917 with 9 home runs and 48 RBI in 61 games. After spending the first half of the 2018 season in extended spring training, he was assigned to the Bristol Pirates and hit .259/.406/.460/.866 with 7 home runs and 26 RBI in 41 games.

=== Texas Rangers ===
Apostel was traded to the Texas Rangers on August 17, 2018, as the player to be named later a previous trade that saw the Pirates acquire pitcher Keone Kela. Apostel was assigned to the Spokane Indians of the Low-A Northwest League and hit .351/.469/.459 with one home run and 10 RBI in 12 games. Apostel was assigned to the Hickory Crawdads of the Single-A South Atlantic League to open the 2019 season. There, he turned in a .258/.325/.470 batting line with 15 home runs and 43 RBI over 80 games. He was promoted to the Down East Wood Ducks of the High-A Carolina League on July 17. Apostel produced a .237/.352/.378 slash line with four home runs and 16 RBI for Down East. On November 20, the Rangers added him to their 40-man roster to protect him from the Rule 5 draft.

With the 2020 minor league season cancelled, Apostel played at the Rangers alternate training site. He was called up to the major leagues for the only time on September 12, 2020, replacing shortstop Elvis Andrus. He made his debut that day against the Oakland Athletics and recorded his first hit off of Yusmeiro Petit. He received the call up to the majors 25 minutes before the start of the game, having missed several calls while napping after his regular training. He batted 2-for-20 with one double and nine strikeouts in seven games in his only MLB season. He ended the season on the injured list after suffering a back injury diving for a groundball.

Apostel split an injury-filled 2021 season between the ACL Rangers of the Rookie-level Arizona Complex League, the Frisco RoughRiders of the Double-A Central, and the Round Rock Express of the Triple-A West, hitting a combined .235/.321/.416 with 10 home runs and 34 RBI. He had knee surgery that September.

Apostel opened the 2022 season with Round Rock. On April 7, he was designated for assignment by Texas. He cleared waivers and was sent outright to Round Rock on April 14. In 19 games for Round Rock, Apostel slashed .224/.325/.433 with three home runs and 15 RBI. He elected free agency following the season on November 10.

=== Chiba Lotte Marines ===
On April 21, 2023, Apostel signed with the Chiba Lotte Marines of Nippon Professional Baseball. He spent the season on their farm team, playing in 24 games, and became a free agent after the season.

== International career ==
Apostel played for the Netherlands national under-18 team at the 2017 U-18 Baseball World Cup, leading the team with a .304 batting average. He played for the Dutch team in the 2018 U-23 Baseball World Cup, batting .375.

Apostel played for the Curaçao national team in the 2026 Haarlem Baseball Week, batting .250 in six games. He also played for Curaçao in the 2026 Central American and Caribbean Games.

== Personal life ==
Apostel's brother, Shendrik, is a former professional first baseman.
