= Down East Wood Ducks =

- 2017–2024; Kinston, North Carolina
Team logo
Cap insignia

Minor league affiliations
- Class: Single-A (2021–2024); Class A-Advanced (2017–2020)
- League: Carolina League (2017–2024)
- Division: North Division

Major league affiliations
- Team: Texas Rangers (2017–2024)

Minor league titles
- League titles (1): 2017
- Division titles (3): 2017; 2021; 2023
- First-half titles (2): 2019; 2023
- Second-half titles (1): 2017

Team data
- Colors: Emerald green, black, hunting orange, gold, white
- Ballpark: Grainger Stadium (2017–2024)

The Down East Wood Ducks were a Minor League Baseball team of the Carolina League and the Single-A affiliate of the Texas Rangers. They were located in Kinston, North Carolina, and are named for the wood duck, a colorful local waterfowl. Established in 2017, the team played its home games at Grainger Stadium, which opened in 1949 and holds 4,100 people.

The Rangers signed a 12-year contract with the city to provide a team to play at Grainger Stadium beginning with the 2017 season. They were members of the Carolina League from 2017 to 2020. With the 2021 restructuring of the minor leagues, the Wood Ducks were placed in the Low-A East, though this was renamed the Carolina League and reclassified as Single-A in 2022. Their lone Carolina League title was won in 2017.

Kinston has hosted farm clubs for 11 different major league franchises and one minor league club in its history. Professional baseball in Kinston dates back to a 1908 squad in the Eastern Carolina League.

The team relocated at the end of the 2024 season to Spartanburg, South Carolina, becoming the Hub City Spartanburgers.

== History ==
Kinston's Grainger Stadium hosted Carolina League baseball every season from 1962 to 2011, bar a three-season gap in the mid-1970s. But in late 2010, Carolina Mudcats owner Steve Bryant announced his purchase of the Kinston Indians franchise to replace his Southern League club in Zebulon for 2012. League travel rules, combined with the gradual shift of other franchises further south and west, had made a Southern League franchise in eastern North Carolina untenable, and a Pensacola, Florida-based ownership group purchased the club to move to a new stadium there for 2012, arranging Bryant's deal to replace them with a Carolina League club under the same branding at the same time. The Indians' move left Kinston without affiliated professional baseball for the first time since 1977. Prior to that, the area was served by the Kinston Expos franchise, which operated as an affiliate of four different Major League Baseball clubs from 1962 to 1974.

Meanwhile, there were reports as early as 2008 that two Class A-Advanced franchises could eventually move from the California League to the Carolina League, most likely the Bakersfield Blaze and High Desert Mavericks. After the Indians' departure, Kinston became an obvious destination; by 2013, rumors suggested strongly that one club would be earmarked for Kinston in any California–Carolina shift. In July 2015, the Texas Rangers signed a tentative lease agreement with the city of Kinston should a franchise become available, but the Rangers needed a move partner before Minor League Baseball would permit a switch. Such a partner emerged in April 2016 when the Houston Astros, affiliated with the California League's Lancaster JetHawks only through the end of that season, began discussions with Fayetteville, North Carolina, about siting their affiliate at a new stadium.

During the 2016 season, the Astros and Rangers worked to secure ownership of the Bakersfield and High Desert franchises to prepare for relocation. On August 22, the Rangers announced that they would indeed site an owned-and-operated High-A affiliate in Kinston for the 2017 season. The Astros would eventually announce their own stadium deal in Fayetteville, but with no suitable facility available until the 2019 season, the Astros temporarily placed their club at Campbell University as the Buies Creek Astros. Both clubs officially entered the Carolina League as expansion franchises, with their predecessor California League franchises terminated rather than relocated.

The new ownership group, Rangers Kinston, LLC, filed a trademark application for the name Wood Ducks on August 15, 2016. One week later, on August 22, the ownership group announced that the Rangers were bringing a team to Kinston and that there would be a naming contest for the fans. On September 16, the team announced the finalists in the contest: Down East Eagles, Down East HamHawks, Down East Hogzillas, Down East Shaggers, and Down East Wood Ducks. At first, the names drew negative reaction from fans who were upset that the team would not be known by the town name, that Kinston was not part of "Down East" North Carolina, and that some of the names were demeaning. This backlash later subsided as the community grew to embrace the moniker. On November 2, the team announced that the new name would be the name that they trademarked on August 15, Down East Wood Ducks, without naming a winning fan. A similar situation happened when Kinston joined the Virginia League in 1925. The owners of that club decided that none of the submitted names in a name the team contest were satisfactory and picked a name of their own choosing, the Eagles.

During the Wood Ducks' inaugural season in 2017, they were crowned co-champions of the Carolina League by defeating the Myrtle Beach Pelicans. Down East and the Lynchburg Hillcats were declared co-champions as a result of the playoffs being called off because of Hurricane Irma.

In September 2017, Ballpark Digest named the Down East Wood Ducks the best logo/branding for Minor League Baseball in 2017.

During the 2018 season, Down East wore uniforms of the Kinston Indians at seven "Throwback Thursday" games to honor the history of baseball at Grainger Stadium.

The 2019 Wood Ducks won the first half of the season with a 50–20 record, but lost to the Fayetteville Woodpeckers, 3–2, in the South Division finals. Corey Ragsdale was selected for the league's Manager of the Year Award.

In conjunction with Major League Baseball's restructuring of Minor League Baseball in 2021, the Wood Ducks were organized into the Low-A East at the Low-A classification. In 2022, the Low-A East became known as the Carolina League, the name historically used by the regional circuit prior to the 2021 reorganization, and was reclassified as a Single-A circuit.

In May 2023, the Texas Rangers sold the Wood Ducks to Diamond Baseball Holdings, which owns and operates many minor league baseball teams across the United States. The team relocated to Fifth Third Park in downtown Spartanburg, South Carolina, for the 2025 season. The team was named the Hub City Spartanburgers. In July 2024, MiLB announced that the relocated team will remain an affiliate of the Texas Rangers and be promoted to class High-A, joining the South Atlantic League.

== Season-by-season results ==
Season	Regular season					Postseason			Ref.
Season	Record	Win %	League	Division	GB	Record	Win %	Result	Ref.
2017	62–77	.446	9th	4th	12	2–0	1.000	Won Second-half Southern Division title Won Southern Division Title vs Myrtle Beach Pelicans, 2–0; Declared Carolina League co-champions with Lynchburg Hillcats	
2018	59–81	.421	10th	5th	26	—	—	—	
2019	87–52	.626	1st	1st	—	2–3	.400	Won First-half Southern Division title Lost Southern Division Title vs Fayetteville Woodpeckers, 3–2	
2020	Season cancelled (COVID-19 pandemic)								
2021	72–48	.600	2nd	1st	—	2–3	.400	Won Central Division title Lost CL championship vs. Charleston RiverDogs, 3–2	
2022	65–66	.496	6th	3rd	10.5	—	—	—	
2023	66–61	.520	3rd	2nd	6	2–3	.400	Won First-half North Division title Won North Division title vs. Carolina Mudcats, 2–1; Lost CL championship vs. Charleston RiverDogs, 2–0	
2024	65–63	.508	8th	5th	12.5	—	—	—	
Totals	476–448	.515	—	—	—	8–9	.471	1 league title, 3 division titles, 3 half division titles	—

== Ballpark ==
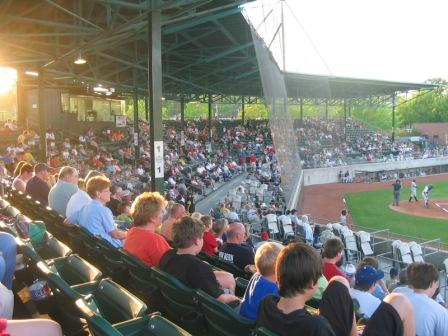
The grandstand at Grainger Stadium in 2006

The Down East Wood Ducks played their home games at Grainger Stadium, located at 400 East Grainger Avenue in Kinston. The original structure was built by architect John J. Rowland in 1949 at a cost of $170,000 inclusive of everything except the land, with $150,000 raised by bond issue. The stadium is owned by the city and was leased by the team. A dedicatory plaque identifies the structure as "Municipal Stadium", but it has been called Grainger Stadium since it was first built. Kinston Indians ownership referred to it as "Historic Grainger Stadium" due to its age relative to other fields in the Carolina League; it is the second-oldest stadium in the circuit. The name Grainger comes from its location on Grainger Avenue as well as its early use by Grainger High School; Grainger is a prominent old family name in Lenoir County. The Texas Rangers invested in a multi-year renovation project to improve the 4,100-seat facility.

== Major league alumni ==
As of the completion of the 2020 season, 24 Wood Ducks players had also played in at least one game for a Major League Baseball team. These players were:

- Sherten Apostel (2019)
- Wes Benjamin (2017)
- Emmanuel Clase (2019)
- Kyle Cody (2017)
- Brett Eibner (2018)
- Demarcus Evans (2019)
- Pete Fairbanks (2017, 2019)
- Anthony Gose (2018)
- Jonathan Hernández (2017–2018)
- Sam Huff (2019)
- James Jones (2018)
- John King (2019)
- Brett Martin (2017)
- Yohander Méndez (2018)
- Joe Palumbo (2017–2018)
- Pedro Payano (2017)
- C. D. Pelham (2018)
- Ricardo Rodriguez (2017)
- Adrian Sampson (2017)
- Jeffrey Springs (2017)
- Locke St. John (2018)
- Leody Taveras (2018)
- Anderson Tejeda (2018–2019)
- Justin Topa (2018–2019)
