= Mike Fiers =

American baseball player (born 1985)

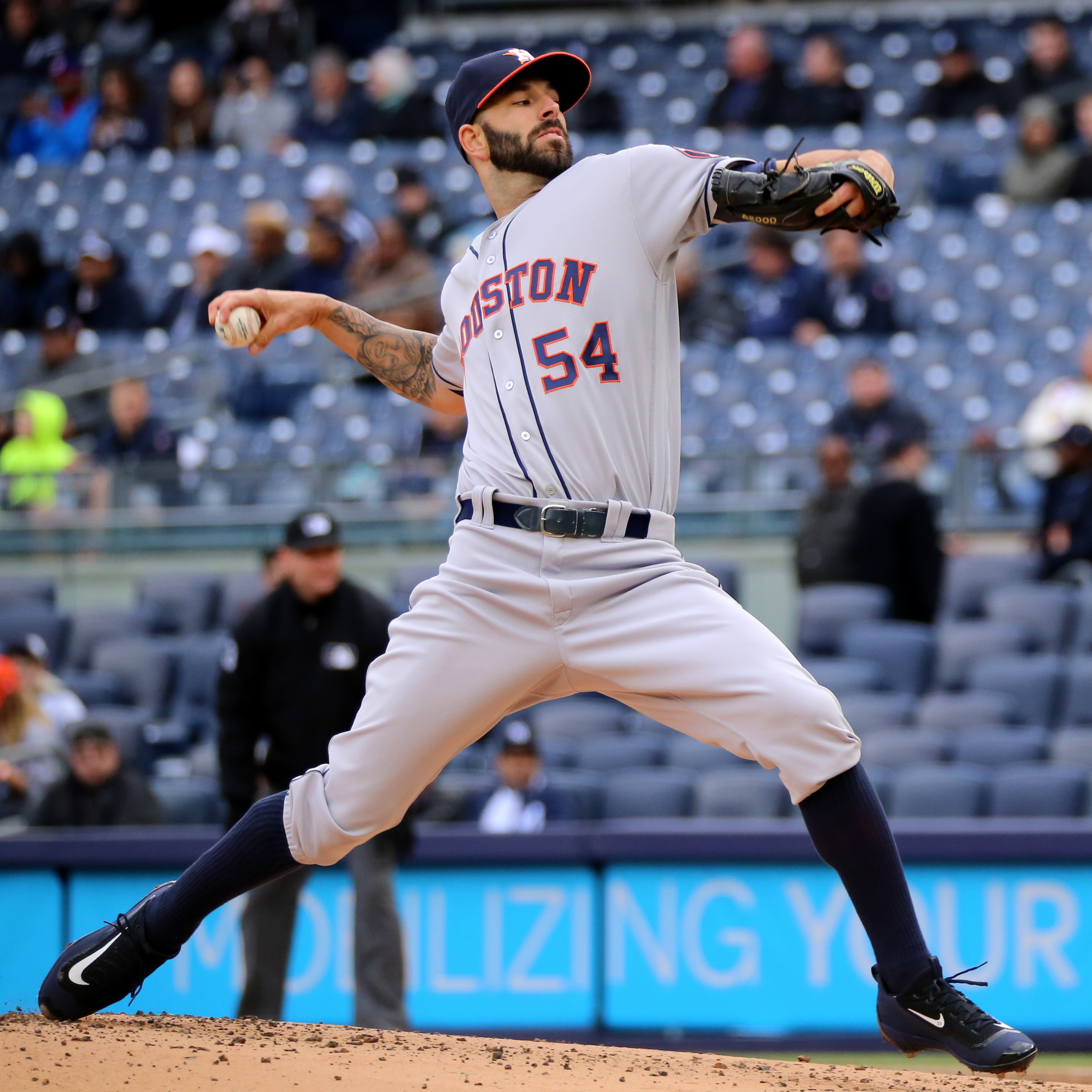
- Fiers with the Houston Astros in 2016
- Pitcher
- Born: June 15, 1985 (age 41); Hollywood, Florida, U.S.
- Batted: Right Threw: Right

MLB debut
- September 14, 2011, for the Milwaukee Brewers

Last MLB appearance
- May 6, 2021, for the Oakland Athletics

MLB statistics
- Win–loss record: 75–64
- Earned run average: 4.07
- Strikeouts: 995
- Stats at Baseball Reference

Teams
- Milwaukee Brewers (2011–2015); Houston Astros (2015–2017); Detroit Tigers (2018); Oakland Athletics (2018–2021)

Career highlights and awards
- Pitched two no-hitters (2015, 2019)

Michael Bruce Fiers (/ˈfaɪərs/; born June 15, 1985) is an American former professional baseball pitcher. He played in Major League Baseball (MLB) for the Milwaukee Brewers, Houston Astros, Detroit Tigers, and Oakland Athletics. Fiers has pitched two no-hitters (one in 2015 and the other in 2019), the latter being the 300th no-hitter in MLB history. Fiers is also known for being the whistleblower in the Houston Astros sign stealing scandal.

== Early life ==
Michael Bruce Fiers was born on June 15, 1985, in Hollywood, Florida. Fiers attended Deerfield Beach High School in Deerfield Beach, Florida, and graduated in 2003.

== College career ==
Fiers enrolled at Broward College and played college baseball for the Broward Seahawks in 2004. He transferred to the University of the Cumberlands for one year, in 2007, and had a 7–2 win–loss record and 3.68 earned run average (ERA) in 10 games for the Cumberland Patriots.

In January 2008, Fiers fell asleep while driving on the Florida Turnpike, crashed into a guard rail, and was ejected through the windshield of the car. He broke four vertebrae. After recovering, Fiers then transferred to Nova Southeastern University. Pitching for the Nova Southeastern Sharks in 2009, Fiers recorded a 10–3 record, a 2.65 ERA, and 145 strikeouts in 108 2/3 innings pitched, leading all of college baseball in strikeouts and breaking the Sharks' school record.

== Professional career ==
=== Draft and minor leagues ===
The Milwaukee Brewers selected Fiers in the 22nd round of the 2009 Major League Baseball draft. He began his career playing for the Rookie league Helena Brewers, Class A Wisconsin Timber Rattlers, and Class A-Advanced Brevard County Manatees in 2009. Fiers played the 2010 season at Brevard and with the Double-A Huntsville Stars. He began the 2011 season with Huntsville, but was promoted to the Triple-A Nashville Sounds in late May 2011.

=== Milwaukee Brewers (2011–2015) ===
Fiers was called up to the majors for the first time on September 10, 2011. He appeared in two games in the major leagues in 2011.

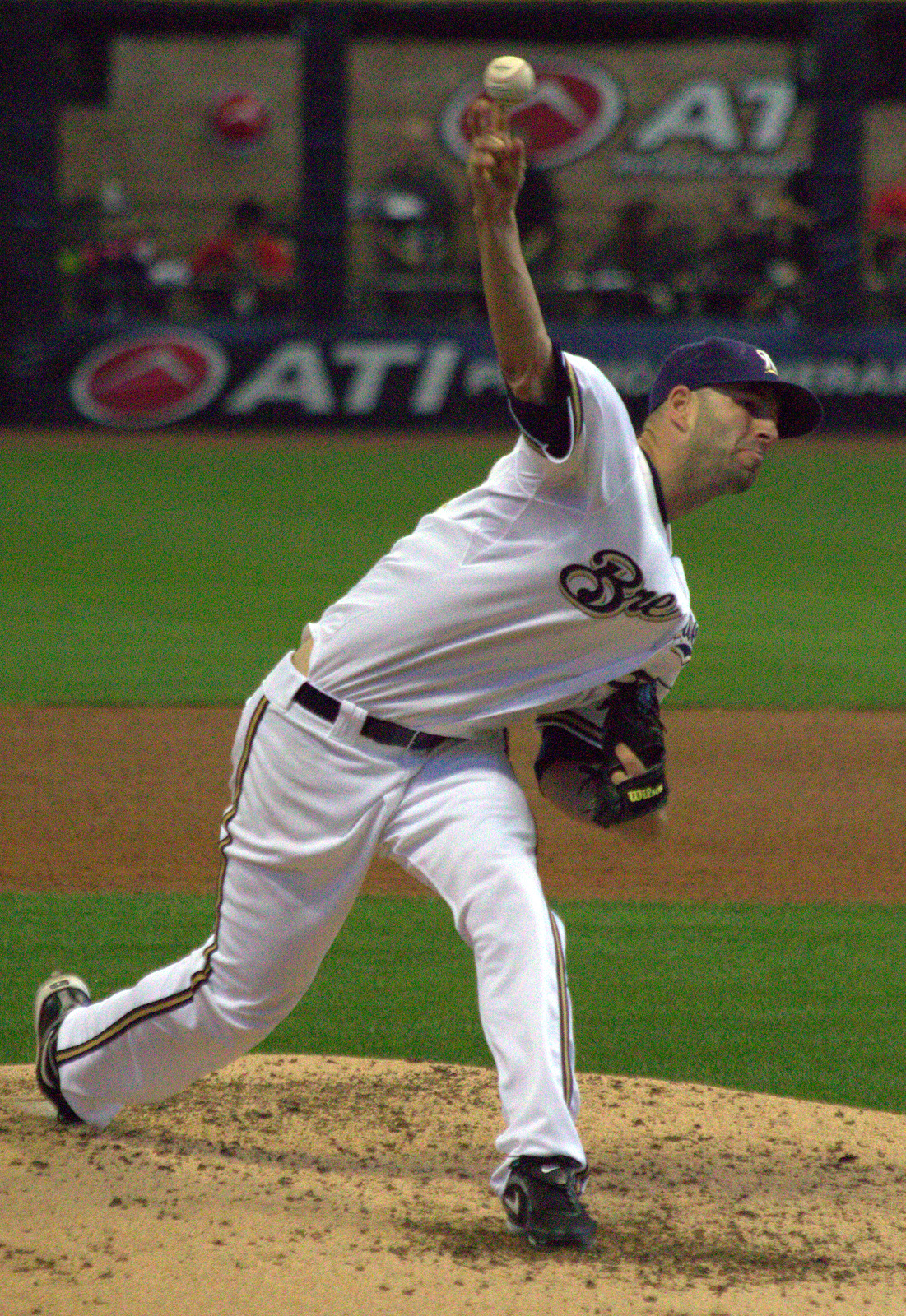
Fiers pitching for the Milwaukee Brewers in 2012.

On August 7, 2012, Fiers carried a perfect game into the 7th inning in a game against the Cincinnati Reds. He pitched eight innings allowing one run on three hits, earning the victory. For the season, he started 22 games for the Brewers, going 9–10 with a 3.74 ERA in 127 2/3 innings. The following year, he was ineffective all season, only starting 3 times while making 8 relief appearances.

In 2014, Fiers split time between the majors and the AAA level. On September 11, pitching against the Miami Marlins, Fiers hit Giancarlo Stanton in the face with an 88-mile-per-hour (142 km/h) fastball, causing Stanton to be hospitalized. With his next pitch, Fiers proceeded to hit Reed Johnson (pinch hitter who was completing Stanton's plate appearance) on one of his hands when he attempted to paint the inside corner. Both pitches were called strikes, because the batters were in the act of swinging. Miami third-baseman Casey McGehee, the on-deck batter, started yelling at the umpire, but Fiers thought that McGehee was yelling at him, so he tried to say that he did not do it on purpose; this then caused a bench-clearing shouting match. Fiers apologized to Stanton, and on September 12, Fiers was fined an undisclosed amount for causing the benches to clear. He finished the season 6–5 despite posting an ERA of 2.13. In 14 games, 10 starts, he struck out 76 in 71 2/3.

On May 7, 2015, Fiers became the 73rd pitcher in MLB history to record an Immaculate inning when he struck out Enrique Hernandez, Carlos Frias, and Joc Pederson on 9 consecutive pitches in the fourth inning. In 21 starts, Fiers was 5–9 with an ERA of 3.89. In 118 innings, he struck out 121.

=== Houston Astros (2015–2017) ===
On July 30, 2015, the Brewers traded Fiers and Carlos Gómez to the Houston Astros for Brett Phillips, Domingo Santana, Josh Hader, and Adrian Houser. On August 21, in his third start for the Astros, Fiers pitched a no-hitter against the Los Angeles Dodgers at Minute Maid Park, the 11th no-hitter in Astros history and the first for any team at Minute Maid Park. It was his first complete game as a major league pitcher. He finished the game with a career-high 134 pitches thrown, striking out 10 batters and walking three. He finished 2–1 for Houston the rest of the 2015 season.

The following season, in 2016, he established a career high with 11 wins. He led the major leagues in wild pitches, with 17.

On September 14, 2017, Fiers was suspended five games for throwing a pitch aimed at the head of Luis Valbuena. Fiers made 29 appearances (28 starts), finishing the year with an 8–10 record and a 5.22 ERA. The Astros finished the 2017 season with a 101–61 record, clinching an AL West pennant. Fiers did not participate in the playoffs, but was still on the 40-man roster at the time. The Astros won the 2017 World Series, giving Fiers his first career championship ring.

=== Detroit Tigers (2018) ===
On December 8, 2017, Fiers signed a one-year, $6 million contract with the Detroit Tigers. Fiers went through extended spring training due to a back injury, and was not on the Tigers 2018 opening day roster. He joined the team on April 8 and won his Tiger debut with six scoreless innings against the Chicago White Sox. On April 21, Fiers became just the second Tigers player since 1908 to give up 10 or more hits in fewer than six innings, strike out nobody and earn a victory, and the first Tigers player to do since Dan Petry in 1984.

Fiers compiled a 7–6 record and a 3.48 ERA in 21 starts for the 2018 Tigers before being traded.

=== Oakland Athletics (2018–2021) ===
On August 6, 2018, Fiers was traded to the Oakland Athletics for two players to be named later or cash considerations. Minor league pitcher Nolan Blackwood was later identified as one of the players. On August 14, Fiers earned his first win with the A's, surrendering two runs and striking out five over six innings against the Seattle Mariners. On September 19, minor league pitcher Logan Shore was traded to the Tigers to complete the trade for Fiers.

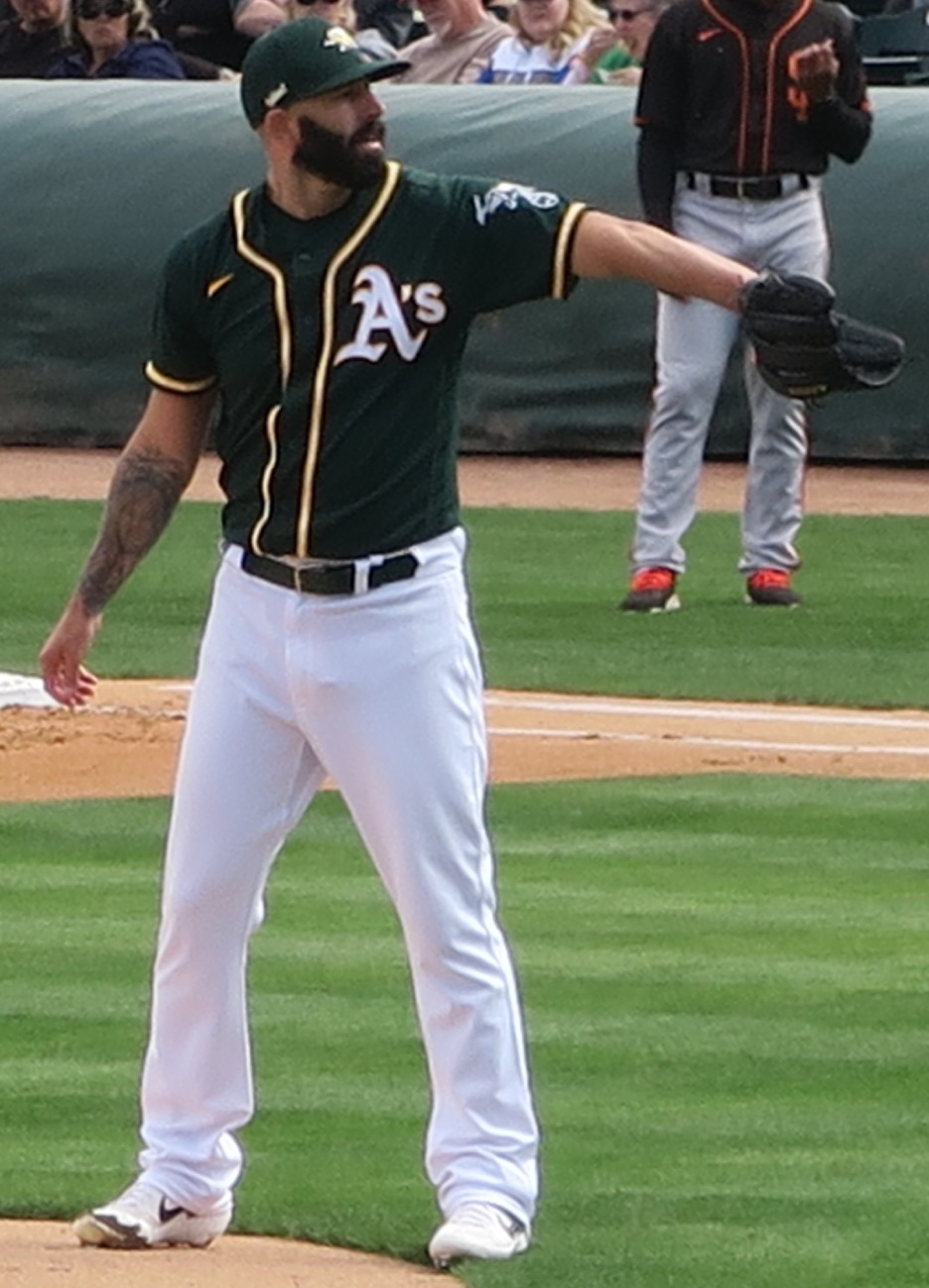
Fiers with the Athletics in February 2020

For the season, between the two teams he was 12–8 with a 3.56 ERA. He had the lowest line drive percentage allowed (17.3%) of all major league pitchers.

On November 30, 2018, the Athletics non-tendered Fiers and he became a free agent. He signed a two-year contract with the Athletics on December 24.

On May 7, 2019, Fiers threw a no-hitter at Oakland-Alameda County Coliseum against the Cincinnati Reds, striking out six and walking two. It was the second no-hitter of his career, and the 300th in MLB history. Facing the Astros on September 9, 2019, Fiers allowed career-highs of both nine runs on five home runs in one-plus innings, as the Astros established a record by hitting six home runs within the first two innings of the game. Fiers finished 2019 with a record of 15–4 with an ERA of 3.90 in 33 starts. In 184 2/3 innings, he struck out 126. In 2020, he led the team in wins with 6. Curiously, despite pitching in the Wild Card Series, he was the only player on the roster to not pitch at any point of the ALDS against the Astros; the Astros dominated the Athletics in a four-game victory.

On February 6, 2021, Fiers re-signed with the Athletics on a one-year, $3.5 million contract. Fiers began the 2021 season on the injured list (IL) and was activated towards the end of April, but after 2 starts he was placed back on the IL on May 9. On May 21, Fiers was transferred to the 60-day injured list with a sprained right elbow.

=== Leones de Yucatán ===
On March 24, 2022, Fiers signed with the Leones de Yucatán of the Mexican League for the 2022 season. At the time his contract was purchased, he had the league's second lowest ERA (2.84) and fourth lowest WHIP (1.20).

=== Uni-President Lions ===
On June 29, 2022, Fiers had his contract purchased by the Uni-President Lions of the Chinese Professional Baseball League. On August 10, Fiers was released and the contract was terminated after failing his physical.

== Role in Houston Astros sign stealing scandal ==
In November 2019, Fiers revealed to journalists Ken Rosenthal and Evan Drellich of The Athletic that in 2017 the Astros used a video camera in center field to steal signs from opposing teams. This was the catalyst for an MLB investigation into the Houston Astros sign stealing scandal. Some baseball commentators, including analyst Jessica Mendoza and Hall of Famer Pedro Martinez, have criticized Fiers for coming forward publicly and only revealing the scandal once he was playing for a divisional rival, while many others in the baseball community defended him.

== Scouting report ==
Fiers throws four pitches. He leads with a four-seam fastball at 88–91 miles per hour (142–146 km/h). He also has a slider (82–85 miles per hour (132–137 km/h)), curveball (70–74 miles per hour (113–119 km/h)), and changeup (79–83 miles per hour (127–134 km/h)). He also experiments with a cutter in the mid 80's for some extra movement to induce ground balls or surprise hitters. His primary off-speed pitch to lefties is the changeup and to righties is the curveball. His changeup is considered by many to be his best pitch, and he has excellent command of the strikezone with all of his pitches. Despite having relatively low velocity, his command, the movement of his pitches (particularly his slow, looping curveball) all make him quite capable of racking up strikeouts. He had a K/9 of 9.6 during his four years in the minors, and has a respectable K/9 of 8.4 in the majors.

== See also ==
- List of Houston Astros no-hitters
- List of Major League Baseball no-hitters
- List of Nova Southeastern University alumni
- List of Oakland Athletics no-hitters

Achievements
Preceded by Hisashi Iwakuma; James Paxton	No-hitter pitcher August 21, 2015; May 7, 2019	Succeeded by Jake Arrieta; Taylor Cole, Felix Peña
