= Kyle Cody =

American baseball player (born 1994)

Free agent
- Pitcher
- Born: August 9, 1994 (age 31); Chippewa Falls, Wisconsin, U.S.
- Bats: Right Throws: Right

MLB debut
- August 21, 2020, for the Texas Rangers

MLB statistics (through 2021 season)
- Win–loss record: 1–3
- Earned run average: 3.71
- Strikeouts: 32
- Stats at Baseball Reference

Teams
- Texas Rangers (2020–2021)

Kyle David Cody (born August 9, 1994) is an American professional baseball pitcher who is a free agent. He has previously played in Major League Baseball (MLB) for the Texas Rangers. He played college baseball for the Kentucky Wildcats of the University of Kentucky.

== Amateur career ==
Cody attended McDonell Central Catholic High School in Chippewa Falls, Wisconsin. He played for the baseball team, and was named the Gatorade Wisconsin Baseball Player of the Year in 2012, his senior year. He also starred for the school's basketball team, being named the Cloverbelt Conference's Player of the Year as a senior, and played for the school's gridiron football team as their quarterback. He was selected as the 2011-12 recipient of the Pat Richter Award presented by WisSports.net as the Triple Play Triple Threat Male Athlete of the Year.

The Philadelphia Phillies selected Cody in the 33rd round of the 2012 MLB draft. He chose not to sign, and instead enrolled at the University of Kentucky to play college baseball for the Kentucky Wildcats. He pitched in the bullpen in 2014. In 2014, he played collegiate summer baseball with the Wareham Gatemen of the Cape Cod Baseball League, where he was named a league all-star. Before the start of the 2015 college season, Cody was named an All-American. Cody produced a 4–4 record with a 4.91 ERA and 63 strikeouts over 66 innings in 2015.

The Minnesota Twins selected Cody with the 73rd overall selection in the 2015 MLB draft. Cody and the Twins did not come to terms on a contract, and Cody returned to Kentucky for his senior year. He produced a 6–2 record with a 3.35 ERA and 75 strikeouts in 83 1/3 innings in 2016.

== Professional career ==
=== Texas Rangers ===
The Texas Rangers then selected Cody in the sixth round, with the 189th overall selection, of the 2016 MLB draft. Cody signed and made his professional debut with the Spokane Indians where he went 2–5 with a 5.13 ERA over 47 1/3 innings. He split 2017 between the Hickory Crawdads and the Down East Wood Ducks, posting a combined 9–6 record with a 2.64 ERA over 126 innings between both clubs. He was named the Texas Rangers Nolan Ryan Pitcher of the Year for 2017.

Cody missed the first three months of the 2018 season as he tried to rehab through right elbow inflammation. He made two rehab outings with the AZL Rangers in July, throwing 5 scoreless innings. He underwent Tommy John surgery on July 19, 2018, and missed the remainder of the 2018 season. Cody missed the entire 2019 season as he continued to rehabilitate following surgery.

Cody was added to the Rangers 40–man roster following the 2019 season. On August 20, 2020, Cody was promoted to the major leagues. He made his major league debut the next day against the Seattle Mariners, pitching a scoreless inning of relief. Cody was named the Rangers Player of the Month for September 2020, and finished his first MLB campaign after posting a 1–1 record with a 1.59 ERA and 18 strikeouts over 22 2/3 innings.

Cody opened 2021 by going 0–2 with a 7.94 ERA over 11 1/3 innings for Texas. On May 9, 2021, Cody was placed on the 60-day injured list with right shoulder inflammation. On September 29, 2021, Texas announced that Cody had undergone debridement surgery of the labrum in his right shoulder, and that he would miss the first half of 2022 as well. On November 19, 2021, Cody was designated for assignment and outrighted off the Rangers active roster. Cody split the 2022 season between the Arizona Complex League Rangers and the Round Rock Express of the Triple-A Pacific Coast League once he returned from injury, going a combined 1–0 with a 2.67 ERA and 39 strikeouts over 30 1/3 innings.

Cody spent the 2023 season with Triple–A Round Rock, appearing in 33 games and registering a 5–4 record and 5.90 ERA with 65 strikeouts across 76 1/3 innings pitched. He elected free agency following the season on November 6, 2023.

=== San Francisco Giants ===
On March 5, 2024, Cody signed with the Lake Country DockHounds of the American Association of Professional Baseball. However, prior to the start of the season on April 25, Cody's contract was purchased by the San Francisco Giants organization. He made 24 appearances split between the rookie–level Arizona Complex League Giants, High–A Eugene Emeralds, Double–A Richmond Flying Squirrels, and Triple–A Sacramento River Cats, accumulating a 6–2 record and 4.88 ERA with 34 strikeouts. Cody was released by the Giants organization on August 13.

=== Lexington Legends ===
On August 20, 2024, Cody signed with the Lexington Legends of the Atlantic League of Professional Baseball. In 5 games (1 start) for Lexington, he recorded a 2.79 ERA with 16 strikeouts across 9 2/3 innings pitched. Cody became a free agent following the season.

=== Tigres de Quintana Roo ===
On January 6, 2025, Cody signed with the Tigres de Quintana Roo of the Mexican League. However, he was released prior to the start of the season on March 11.

== Personal life ==
Kyle is the youngest of four children of Gene and Jackie Cody. When Kyle was three years old, he was a passenger in an auto accident which took the life of his four-year-old brother Tyler.
