= Brett Martin (baseball) =

American baseball player (born 1995)

- Pitcher
- Born: April 28, 1995 (age 31); Morristown, Tennessee, U.S.
- Batted: Left Threw: Left

MLB debut
- April 19, 2019, for the Texas Rangers

Last MLB appearance
- September 16, 2022, for the Texas Rangers

MLB statistics
- Win–loss record: 8–15
- Earned run average: 3.85
- Strikeouts: 152
- Stats at Baseball Reference

Teams
- Texas Rangers (2019–2022)

Brett Ryan Martin (born April 28, 1995) is an American former professional baseball pitcher. He played in Major League Baseball (MLB) for the Texas Rangers from 2019 to 2022.

== Amateur career ==
Martin attended Morristown-Hamblen High School East in Morristown, Tennessee. Undrafted out of high school, Martin initially attended the University of Tennessee, but suffered an injury and transferred before appearing in a game. He transferred to Walters State Community College and played college baseball in 2014 for them, producing a 9–2 record with a 3.83 earned run average (ERA) in 42 innings.

== Professional career ==
Martin was drafted by the Texas Rangers in the fourth round, with the 126th overall selection, of the 2014 Major League Baseball draft and signed for a $475,000 signing bonus. He made his professional debut in 2014 with the Rookie-level Arizona League Rangers, going 1–4 with a 5.40 ERA in 15 games. In 2015, Martin played for the Hickory Crawdads of the Single-A South Atlantic League, compiling a 5–6 record and 3.49 ERA in 20 games (18 starts). In 2016, he played for the AZL Rangers, Crawdads, and High Desert Mavericks of the High-A California League, posting a combined 4–4 record with a 4.41 ERA in 17 starts between the three teams. Martin appeared in three games for the Surprise Saguaros of the Arizona Fall League in 2016. Martin spent 2017 with the Down East Wood Ducks of the High-A Carolina League where he started 16 games and collected a 4–8 record and 4.70 ERA with 90 strikeouts in 84 1/3 innings.

On November 20, 2017, the Rangers added Martin to their 40-man roster to protect him from the Rule 5 draft. He spent the 2018 season with the Frisco RoughRiders of the Double-A Texas League with whom he struggled, posting a 2–10 record with a 7.28 ERA in 89 innings over 29 games (15 starts). In 2019, Martin was optioned to the Nashville Sounds of the Triple-A Pacific Coast League to open the season, as a reliever.

On April 19, 2019, Martin was called up to the major league roster for the first time. He made his debut that night, recording a scoreless inning in relief versus the Houston Astros. He finished the 2019 season with Texas, going 2–3 with a 4.76 ERA and 62 strikeouts over 62 1/3 innings. In 2020, Martin was 1–1 with a 1.84 ERA in 14 2/3 innings. Over 62 1/3 innings in 2021 for Texas, Martin posted a 4–4 record with a 3.18 ERA while striking out 42 batters. In 2022, Martin posted a 1–7 record with a 4.14 ERA and 40 strikeouts over 50 innings.

On January 13, 2023, it was announced that Martin would undergo shoulder surgery and would miss the 2023 season. On November 17, he was non-tendered by the Rangers and became a free agent. On October 5, 2024, Martin confirmed his retirement from professional baseball.

== Personal life ==
Martin has type 1 diabetes. On July 3, 2020, it was announced that Martin had tested positive for COVID-19.
