= Andrew Heaney =

American baseball player (born 1991)

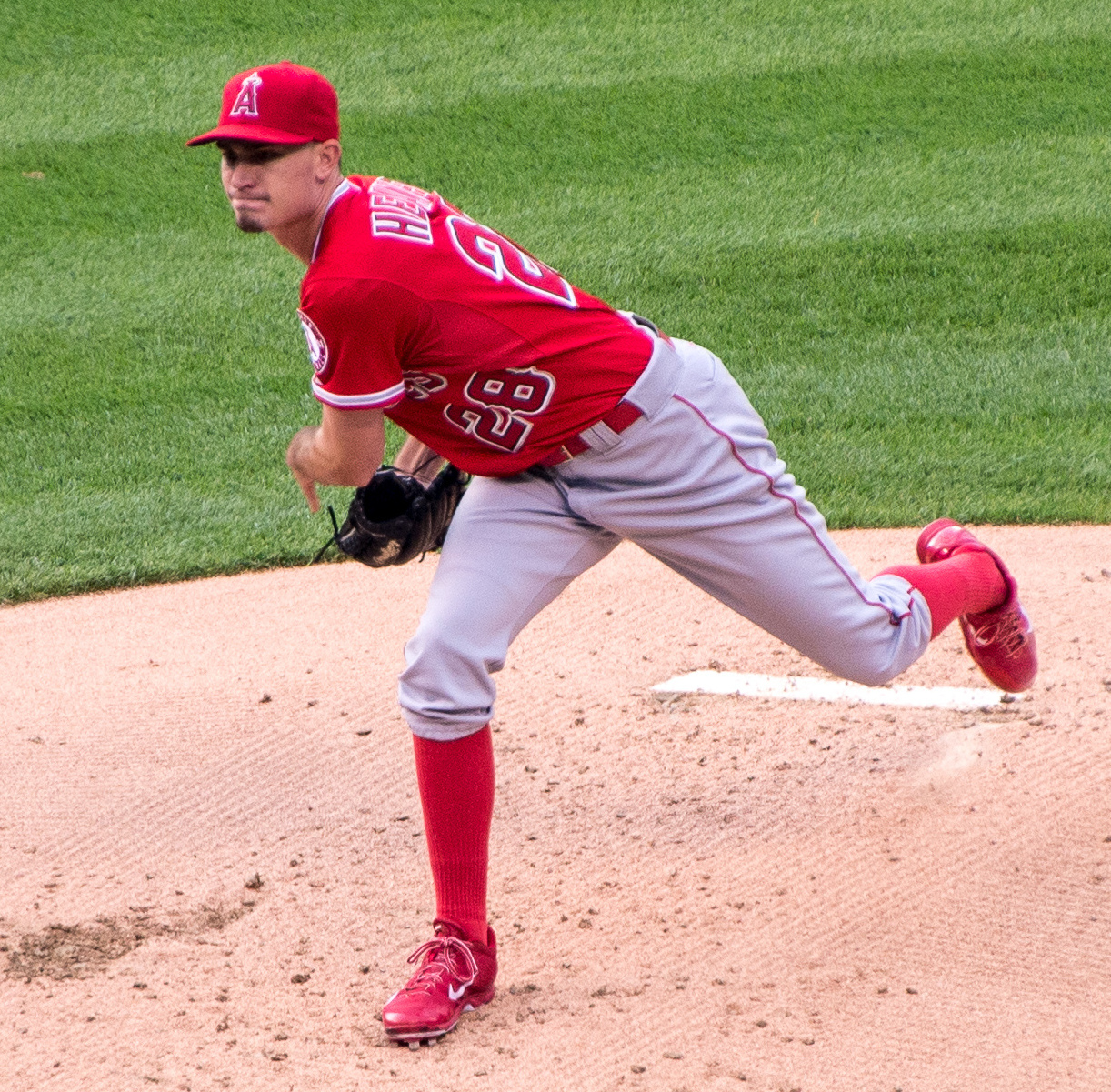
- Heaney with the Los Angeles Angels in 2015
- Pitcher
- Born: June 5, 1991 (age 35); Oklahoma City, Oklahoma, U.S.
- Batted: Left Threw: Left

MLB debut
- June 19, 2014, for the Miami Marlins

Last MLB appearance
- September 27, 2025, for the Los Angeles Dodgers

MLB statistics
- Win–loss record: 56–72
- Earned run average: 4.57
- Strikeouts: 1,156
- Stats at Baseball Reference

Teams
- Miami Marlins (2014); Los Angeles Angels of Anaheim / Los Angeles Angels (2015–2021); New York Yankees (2021); Los Angeles Dodgers (2022); Texas Rangers (2023–2024); Pittsburgh Pirates (2025); Los Angeles Dodgers (2025)

Career highlights and awards
- World Series champion (2023)

Andrew Mark Heaney (born June 5, 1991) is an American former professional baseball pitcher. He played in Major League Baseball (MLB) for the Miami Marlins, Los Angeles Angels, New York Yankees, Los Angeles Dodgers, Texas Rangers, and Pittsburgh Pirates. Prior to becoming a professional, he played college baseball for the Oklahoma State Cowboys.

The Marlins drafted Heaney in the first round of the 2012 MLB draft and he made his MLB debut in 2014. Heaney won the 2023 World Series as a member of the Rangers.

== Early life and amateur career ==
Andrew Mark Heaney was born on June 5, 1991, in Oklahoma City, Oklahoma. Heaney attended Putnam City High School in Warr Acres, Oklahoma, where he played for the school's baseball team.

The Tampa Bay Rays selected Heaney in the 24th round of the 2009 Major League Baseball draft, but he did not sign, opting to enroll at Oklahoma State University, where he played college baseball for the Oklahoma State Cowboys, competing in the Big 12 Conference of the National Collegiate Athletic Association's (NCAA) Division I. In 2011, he pitched in collegiate summer baseball for the Falmouth Commodores of the Cape Cod Baseball League.

In 2012, Heaney's junior season, he pitched to an 8–2 win–loss record and a 1.60 earned run average (ERA) in 118 1/3 innings pitched. He led all NCAA pitchers with 140 strikeouts. Heaney was named Big 12 Conference Baseball Pitcher of the Year in 2012. Heaney was a unanimous All-America selection, being named a first-team All-American by Baseball America, Collegiate Baseball, the American Baseball Coaches Association, and the National Collegiate Baseball Writers Association.

== Professional career ==
=== Miami Marlins (2012–2014) ===
==== Minor leagues ====
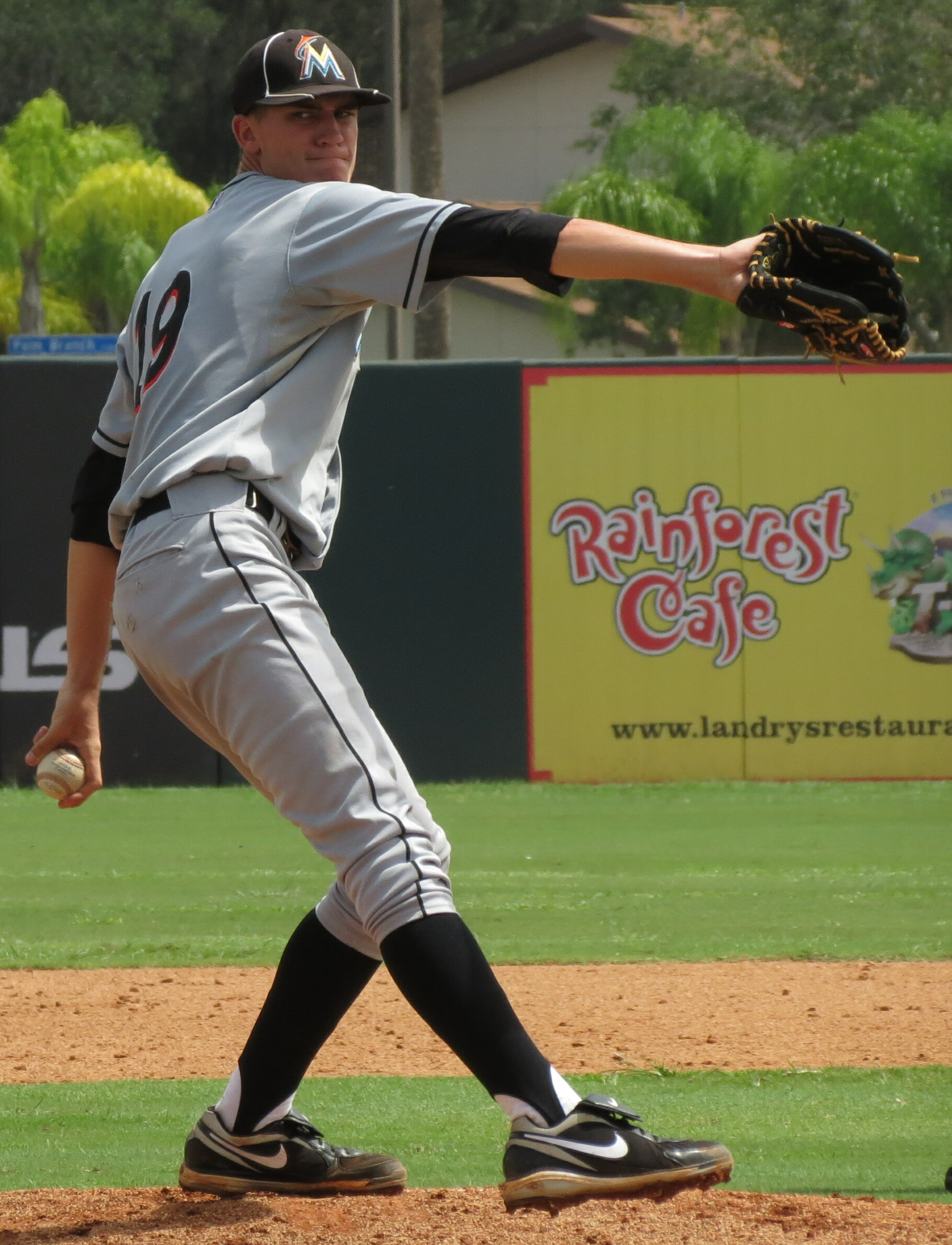
Heaney in 2012

The Miami Marlins drafted Heaney in the first round of the 2012 Major League Baseball draft. Heaney was the ninth selection and received an estimated $2.6 million signing bonus.

Heaney began the 2013 season with the Jupiter Hammerheads of the High-A Florida State League, and was promoted to the Jacksonville Suns of the Double-A Southern League in August. Between Jupiter and Jacksonville, he amassed a 34-inning scoreless streak. Heaney began the 2014 season with Jacksonville, and was promoted to the New Orleans Zephyrs of the Triple-A Pacific Coast League in May. In his Triple-A debut, he faced the Oklahoma City Redhawks and went five innings, allowing one run on seven hits while adding seven strikeouts and no walks. He took a no decision.

==== Major leagues ====
Heaney made his major-league debut on June 19, 2014, against the New York Mets, going six innings and allowing one run while striking out three. He took the loss in a 1–0 game. In seven games (five starts) for Miami during his rookie campaign, Heaney posted an 0-3 record and 5.83 ERA with 20 strikeouts across 29 1/3 innings pitched.

=== Los Angeles Angels of Anaheim / Los Angeles Angels (2015–2021) ===
On December 10, 2014, the Marlins traded Heaney to the Los Angeles Dodgers, along with Chris Hatcher, Austin Barnes, and Enrique Hernández, for Dan Haren, Dee Gordon, and Miguel Rojas. Five hours later, he was traded to the Los Angeles Angels for Howie Kendrick. Heaney thanked the Dodgers for their short time together, tweeting, "Well, @Dodgers we had a good run! Great to be a part of such a storied franchise. #thanksforthememories".

After some injuries to the starting rotation, Heaney was called up and made 18 starts for the Angels. He went 6-4 with a 3.49 ERA and 78 strikeouts in 105 innings while displaying an excellent strikeout to walk ratio of 2.79 for Anaheim.

In 2016, Heaney made the Angels opening day rotation as their #2 starter. In what turned out to be his only start, after allowing 4 runs in 6 innings, Heaney left the game. After the game, Heaney felt discomfort in his elbow, he was immediately placed on the disabled list. On April 30, Heaney received a platelet-rich plasma injection in his left elbow, sidelining him for 6 weeks. On June 28, Heaney underwent evaluations on his elbow and found no improvement, pushing back his return even further. On July 1, Heaney underwent Tommy John surgery and missed the remainder of the 2016 season. Heaney would finish his 2016 season with an ERA of 6.00 in six innings. In 2017, in 21 2/3 innings he was 1–2 with a 7.06 ERA and 27 strikeouts.

On June 5, 2018, the day of his 27th birthday, Heaney pitched a one-hit complete game shutout as the Angels won 1–0 over the Kansas City Royals. Heaney was the only Angels starter to start 30 games in 2018. He finished the 2018 season 9–10 with an ERA of 4.15 and 180 strikeouts in 180 innings.

Heaney entered 2019 as the projected #1 starter but suffered an elbow inflammation and was shut down after his first spring start. He was shut down again on March 28 after experiencing a setback during a side session.

On July 6, 2019, Heaney became the first pitcher to start after the passing of fellow left-hander Tyler Skaggs. His first pitch against George Springer of Houston Astros was mimicking an overhand and slow curveball, which was Skaggs' best pitch, and was unchallenged with no swing. In 18 starts, Heaney was 4–6 with a 4.91 ERA.

Heaney was named the Angels' opening day starter for the 2020 season. In the 3–7 no-decision loss to the Oakland Athletics, Heaney pitched 4 2/3 innings, striking out 6 batters and allowing 1 run. He finished the shortened season with a record of 4–3 in 12 starts. He struck out 70 batters in 66 2/3 innings.

=== New York Yankees (2021) ===
On July 30, 2021, Heaney was traded to the New York Yankees in exchange for Janson Junk and Elvis Peguero. On August 12, Heaney was the starting pitcher in the first Field of Dreams game in Dyersville, Iowa against the Chicago White Sox. Heaney went 5 innings giving up 5 hits, 7 runs, 3 walks, and 3 home runs while striking out 5 batters as the Yankees lost 9–8. Prior to the 2021 American League Wild Card Game, Heaney was designated for assignment. On October 8, Heaney rejected his outright assignment and elected free agency.

=== Los Angeles Dodgers (2022) ===
On November 10, 2021, Heaney signed a one-year, $8.5 million contract with the Los Angeles Dodgers. He made 14 starts and two relief appearances for the Dodgers in 2022, with a 4–4 record and 3.10 ERA while striking out 110 batters. He also had a couple of lengthy stints on the injured list.

=== Texas Rangers (2023–2024) ===
On December 9, 2022, Heaney signed a two-year contract with the Texas Rangers. On April 10, 2023, Heaney recorded 9 consecutive strikeouts in a game against the Kansas City Royals, which tied the American League record and set the franchise record. In 34 appearances (28 starts) for the Rangers in 2023, he logged a 10-6 record and 4.15 ERA with 151 strikeouts across 147 1/3 innings pitched.

In the playoffs, Heaney made three starts. He started Game 1 of the 2023 American League Division Series, and pitched the first 3 2/3 innings, a game in which the Rangers went on to win 3-2. In Game 4 of the 2023 American League Championship Series, Heaney lasted only 2/3 of an inning, surrendering four hits, three earned runs, and one walk. The Rangers would go on to lose the game 10-3. He also started and earned the win in Game 4 of the 2023 World Series, pitching five innings while only allowing four hits, two walks, and one earned run, while also recording three strikeouts. The Rangers ultimately won the World Series in five games, giving Heaney his first World Series ring.

Heaney made 32 appearances (31 starts) for Texas during the 2024 campaign, compiling a 5-14 record and 4.28 ERA with 159 strikeouts across 160 innings pitched.

=== Pittsburgh Pirates (2025) ===
On February 22, 2025, Heaney signed a one-year, $5.25 million contract with the Pittsburgh Pirates. Heaney struggled to a 5-10 record and 4.99 ERA over his first 24 games (23 starts), and was shifted to the bullpen on August 16. After continued struggles, including allowing five runs in 2/3 of an inning against the St. Louis Cardinals, Heaney was designated for assignment by the Pirates on August 26. He was released by Pittsburgh on August 29.

=== Los Angeles Dodgers (2025) ===
On August 31, 2025, Heaney signed a minor league contract to return to the Dodgers organization. In four starts for the Triple-A Oklahoma City Comets, he recorded an 0.90 ERA with 13 strikeouts across 10 innings pitched. On September 27, the Dodgers selected Heaney's contract, adding him to their active roster. in his lone game pitched for the Dodgers, he pitched two innings, allowing three runs on four hits. He was subsequently left off the postseason roster.

Heaney announced his retirement from professional baseball on December 28, 2025.

== Pitching style ==
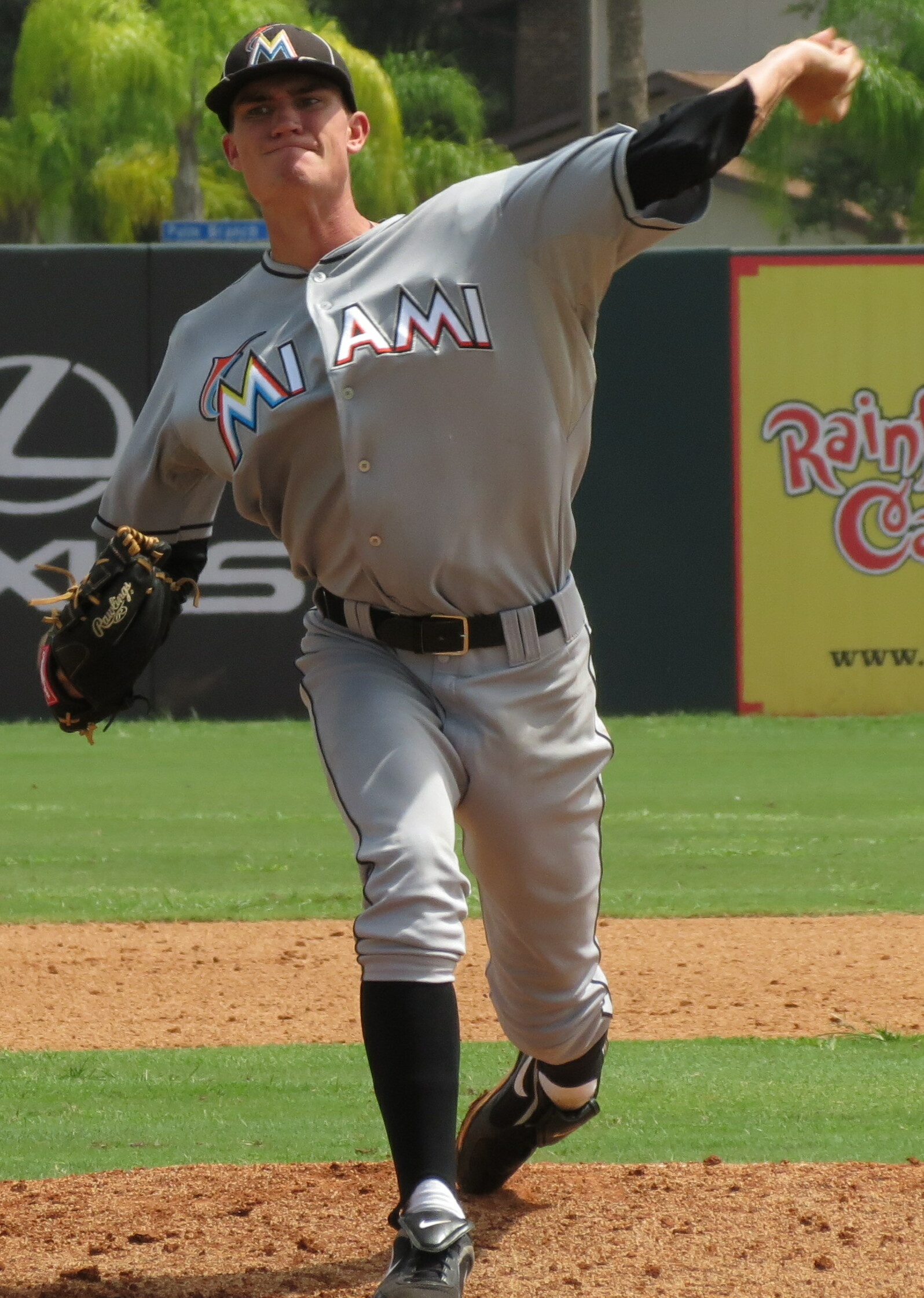
Heaney mid-pitch in 2012

Heaney was a low three-quarters pitcher with a long stride. He threw three pitches: a four-seam fastball that averages 92 miles per hour (148 km/h) and can touch 95 miles per hour (153 km/h), a curveball at 80 miles per hour (130 km/h), and a changeup at 84 miles per hour (135 km/h). In 2022 with the Dodgers, Heaney added a "sweeping" style slider to his repertoire.

== Personal life ==
Heaney and his wife, Jordan, met in high school and married in 2014. In 2019, they implemented a dog therapy program at Children's Hospital of Orange County.

== See also ==
- 2012 College Baseball All-America Team
