= Wes Benjamin =

American baseball player (born 1993)

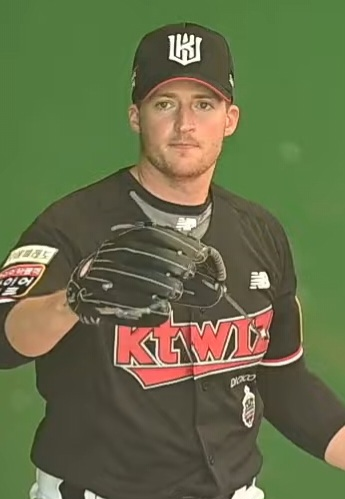
- Benjamin with the KT Wiz in 2022

Doosan Bears – No. 48
- Pitcher
- Born: July 26, 1993 (age 33); Winfield, Illinois, U.S.
- Bats: Right Throws: Left

Professional debut
- MLB: August 16, 2020, for the Texas Rangers
- KBO: June 9, 2022, for the KT Wiz

MLB statistics (through 2021 season)
- Win–loss record: 2–3
- Earned run average: 6.80
- Strikeouts: 40

KBO statistics (through August 18, 2026)
- Win–loss record: 36–25
- Earned run average: 3.49
- Strikeouts: 498
- Stats at Baseball Reference

Teams
- Texas Rangers (2020–2021); KT Wiz (2022–2024); Doosan Bears (2026–present)

Wesley Scott Benjamin (born July 26, 1993) is an American professional baseball pitcher for the Doosan Bears of the KBO League. He has previously played in Major League Baseball (MLB) for the Texas Rangers, and in the KBO League for the KT Wiz.

== Amateur career ==
Benjamin attended St. Charles East High School in St. Charles, Illinois. He played college baseball for the University of Kansas Jayhawks. Benjamin underwent Tommy John surgery on April 10, 2014. After his junior year of college, he was drafted by the Texas Rangers in the fifth round, 156th overall, of the 2014 Major League Baseball draft.

== Professional career ==
=== Texas Rangers ===
Benjamin made his professional debut with the Arizona League Rangers of the Rookie-level Arizona League in 2015, appearing in one game for them. He spent the 2016 season with the Hickory Crawdads of the Single–A South Atlantic League, going 6–5 with a 3.79 ERA and 101 strikeouts over 102 innings. He spent the 2017 season with the Down East Wood Ducks of the High–A Carolina League, going 10–7 with a 3.94 ERA and 101 strikeouts over 118 2/3 innings pitched. Benjamin split the 2018 season between the Frisco RoughRiders of the Double-A Texas League and the AZL Rangers, going a combined 5–6 with a 3.32 ERA and 81 strikeouts over 86 2/3 innings. He spent the 2019 season with the Nashville Sounds of the Triple-A Pacific Coast League, going 7–6 with a 5.52 ERA and 114 strikeouts over 135 1/3 innings.

Benjamin was called up to the major leagues for the first time on August 11, 2020. He made his major league debut on August 16 against the Colorado Rockies. With the Rangers in 2020, Benjamin went 2–1 with a 4.84 ERA and 21 strikeouts over 22 1/3 innings.

With the Round Rock Express of the Triple-A West in 2021, Benjamin went 2–5 with a 8.29 ERA. With Texas in 2021, Benjamin went 0–2 with a 8.74 ERA and 19 strikeouts over 22 2/3 innings. On October 3, 2021, Benjamin was designated for assignment. On October 6, he cleared waivers and was sent outright to Triple–A Round Rock.

=== Chicago White Sox ===
On February 21, 2022, Benjamin signed a minor league contract with the Chicago White Sox. He made 7 starts for the Triple-A Charlotte Knights, going 2–0 with a 3.82 ERA in 30 2/3 innings. On May 17, 2022, Benjamin requested and was granted his release in order to pursue an opportunity in Asia.

=== KT Wiz ===
On May 18, 2022, Benjamin signed with the KT Wiz of the KBO League. For KT in 2022, he posted a 5–4 record with a 2.70 ERA and 77 strikeouts over 96 2/3 innings.

On December 9, 2022, Benjamin re-signed with KT for the 2023 season on a $1.3 million contract. In 29 starts for the Wiz, he registered a 15–6 record and 3.54 ERA with 157 strikeouts across 160 innings of work.

On December 12, 2023, Benjamin once more re–signed with the team on a one–year, $1.4 million contract. In 30 starts, he went 11–8 with a 4.63 ERA and 156 strikeouts over 149 2/3 innings. On November 30, 2024, the Wiz non–tendered Benjamin, making him a free agent.

=== San Diego Padres ===
On February 25, 2025, Benjamin signed a minor league contract with the San Diego Padres. He made 28 appearances (22 starts) for the Triple-A El Paso Chihuahuas, posting a 4-8 record and 6.42 ERA with 88 strikeouts and one save over 108 innings of work. Benjamin was released by the Padres organization on November 3.

=== Doosan Bears ===
On April 6, 2026, Benjamin signed with the Doosan Bears of the KBO League as an injury replacement for Chris Flexen. He pitched to a 2.66 ERA in 13 starts, the third-best mark in the league during that period. On July 2, Benjamin signed a $450,000 contract extension to remain with the team through the end of the season.
