= Dane Acker =

Free agent
- Pitcher
- Born: April 1, 1999 (age 27); College Station, Texas, U.S.
- Bats: Right Throws: Right

Dane Harrison Acker (born April 1, 1999) is an American professional baseball pitcher who is a free agent.

== Amateur career ==
Acker attended Brenham High School in Brenham, Texas. Acker pitched to a 5–2 record with a 1.79 ERA his senior season of 2017. Undrafted out of high school, he attended Rice University to play for the Owls. Acker went 5–2 with a 4.20 ERA and 32 strikeouts over 40 2/3 innings his freshman season. Following that year, he transferred to San Jacinto College. As a sophomore with San Jacinto in 2019, Acker went 10–0 with a 2.36 ERA and 97 strikeouts over 76 1/3 innings. Acker was drafted by the Arizona Diamondbacks in the 23rd round of the 2019 MLB draft, but did not sign and transferred to the University of Oklahoma to play for the Sooners. Acker played for the Chatham Anglers of the Cape Cod Baseball League in the summer of 2019. In the COVID shortened season of 2020, Acker went 1–1 with a 3.51 ERA and 28 strikeouts over 25 2/3 innings for OU. In a game on March 1, Acker threw a no-hitter versus LSU, in which he recorded 11 strikeouts.

== Professional career ==
Acker was drafted by the Oakland Athletics in the 4th round of the 2020 MLB draft. He signed with them for a $447,400 signing bonus.

Acker did not play professionally in 2020 due to the cancellation of the Minor League Baseball season because of the COVID-19 pandemic. On February 6, 2021, Acker, Khris Davis, and Jonah Heim were traded to Texas Rangers in exchange for Elvis Andrus, Aramis Garcia and cash considerations.

Acker made two starts for the Down East Wood Ducks of the Low-A East in 2021 before suffering a torn UCL and underwent Tommy John surgery in May 2021. After successfully rehabbing, Acker returned to game action in July 2022. He split the remainder of 2022 between the ACL Rangers of the Rookie-level Arizona Complex League and the Hickory Crawdads of the High-A South Atlantic League, going a combined 0–3 with a 6.31 ERA and 31 strikeouts over 25 2/3 innings. Acker opened the 2023 season on the injured list, until May 24 when he was assigned back to Hickory. Over six games with Hickory, he went 0–0 with a 2.11 ERA and 25 strikeouts over 21 1/3 innings. He was promoted to the Frisco RoughRiders of the Double-A Texas League on July 3. Over 46 innings for Frisco, Acker went 1–1 with a 2.74 ERA and 51 strikeouts.

In 2026, Acker appeared in nine games (two starts) with Triple-A Round Rock Express he threw 16.2 innings going 1-1 with a 9.18 ERA and 17 strikeouts. He elected free agency on November 2.
