= List of Texas Rangers team records =

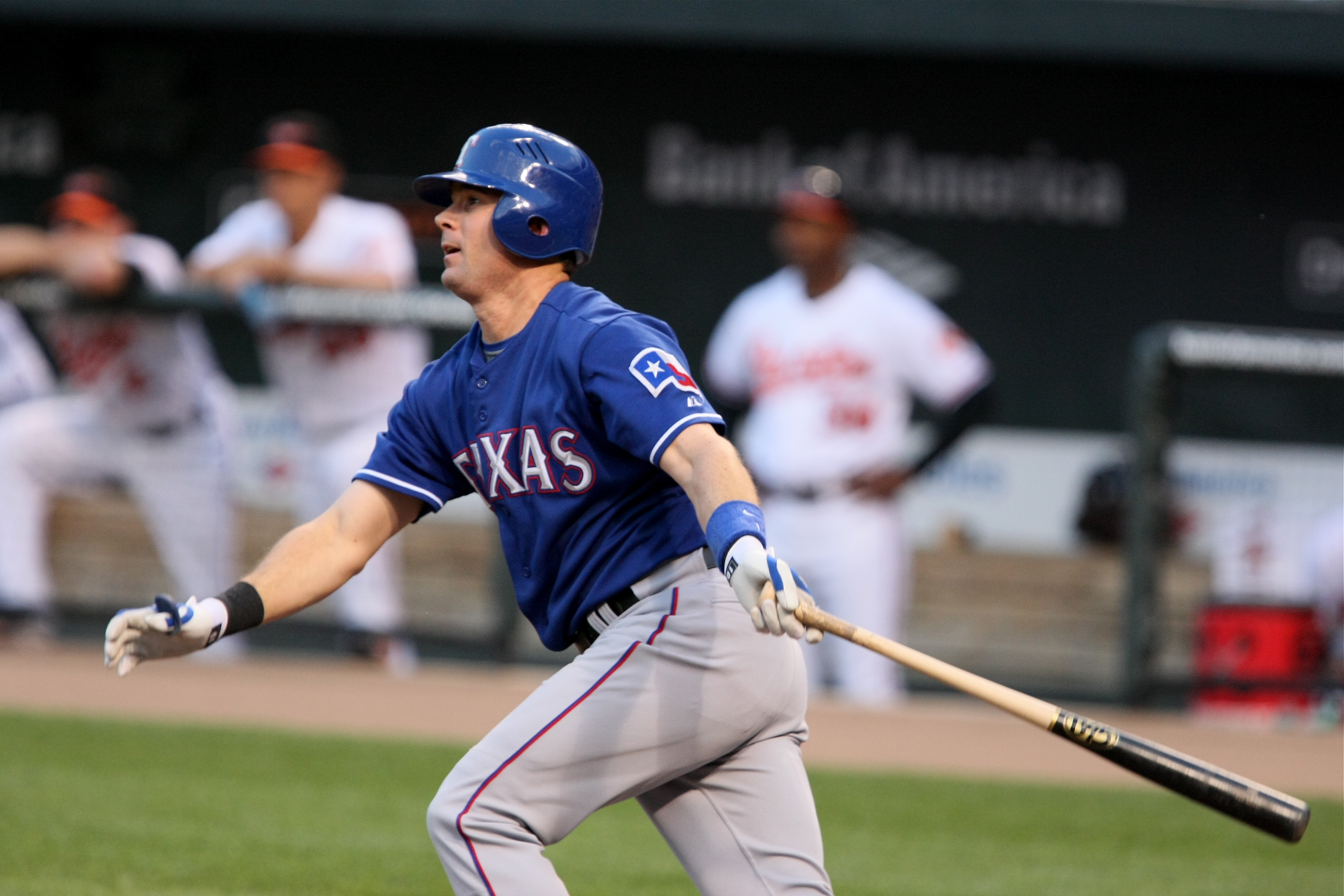
Michael Young is the Rangers' career leader in games played (1,823), at bats (7,399), runs (1,085), hits (2,230), doubles (415), and triples (55).

The Texas Rangers Major League Baseball team has played in Arlington, Texas, since 1972. The team began in 1961 as the Washington Senators, an American League expansion team based in Washington, D.C., before relocating to Texas. This list documents players and teams who hold records set in various statistical areas during single games, entire seasons, or their Rangers' careers.

== Table key ==
| † | Record was set when the team was known as the Washington Senators |
| ‡ | Record encompasses career with the Texas Rangers and Washington Senators |
| * | Tied record |

== Career records ==
These are records of players with the best performance in distinct statistical categories during their career with the Rangers.

=== Batting ===
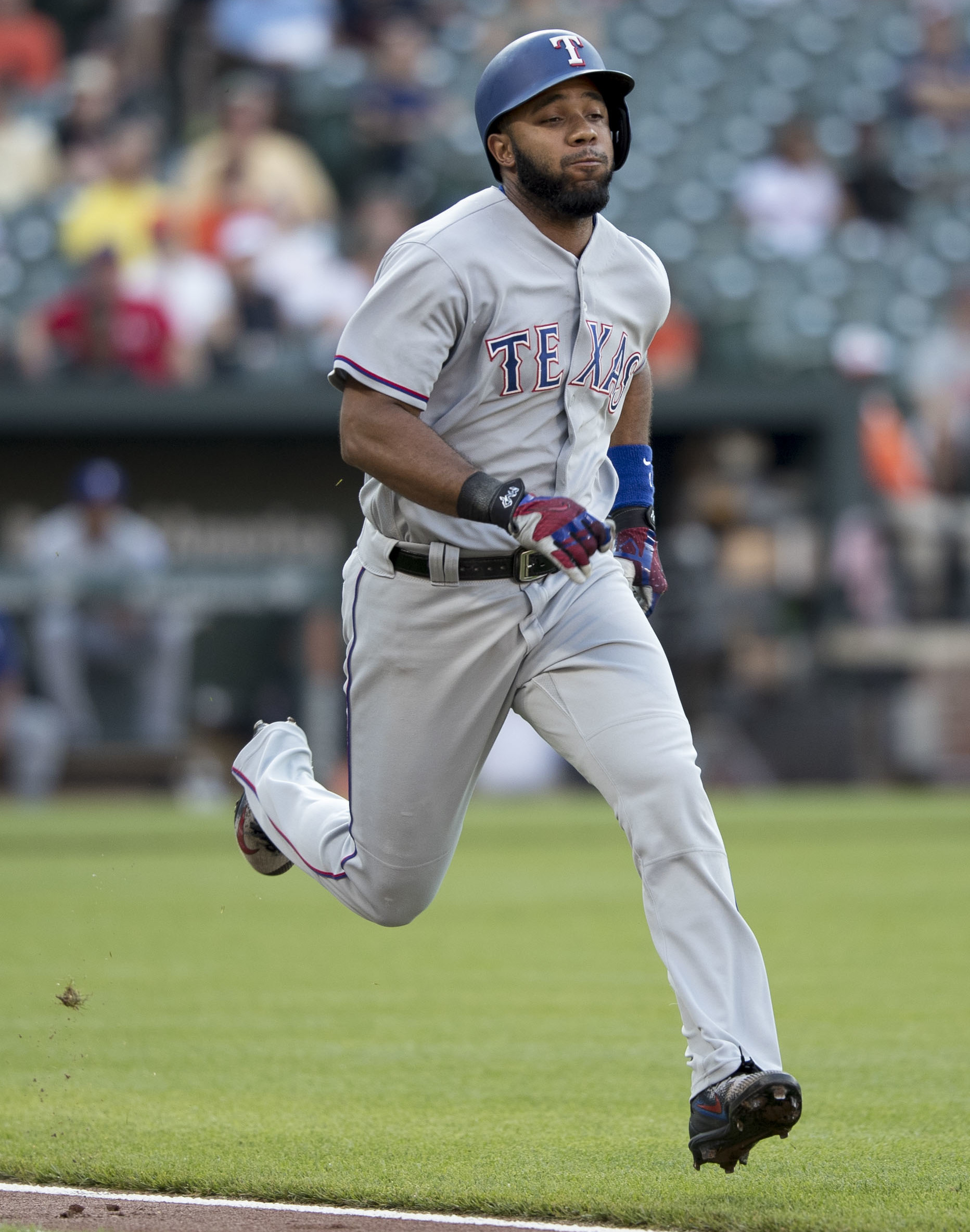
Elvis Andrus is the Rangers' career leader in stolen bases (305).

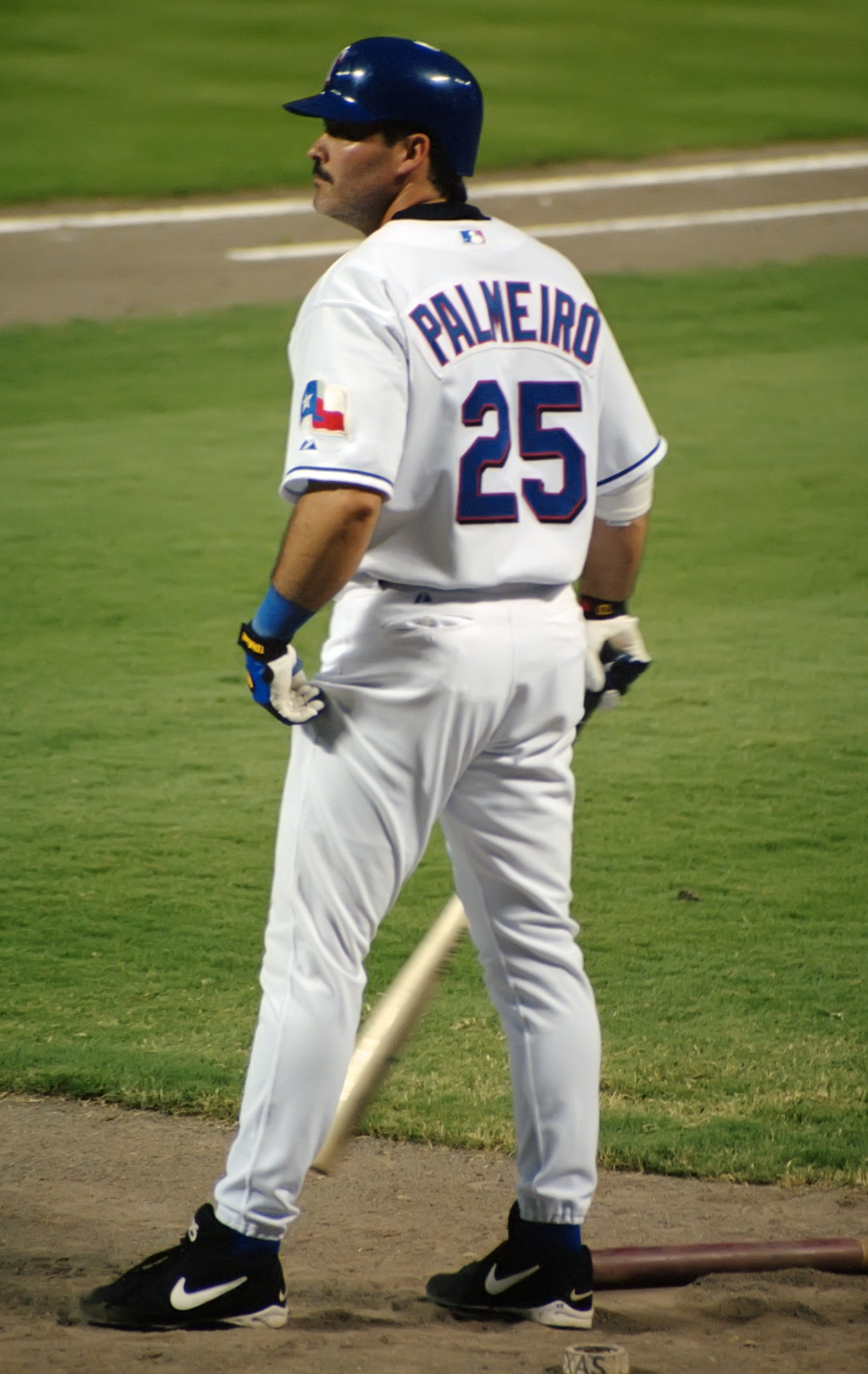
Rafael Palmeiro is the Rangers' career leader in walks (805).

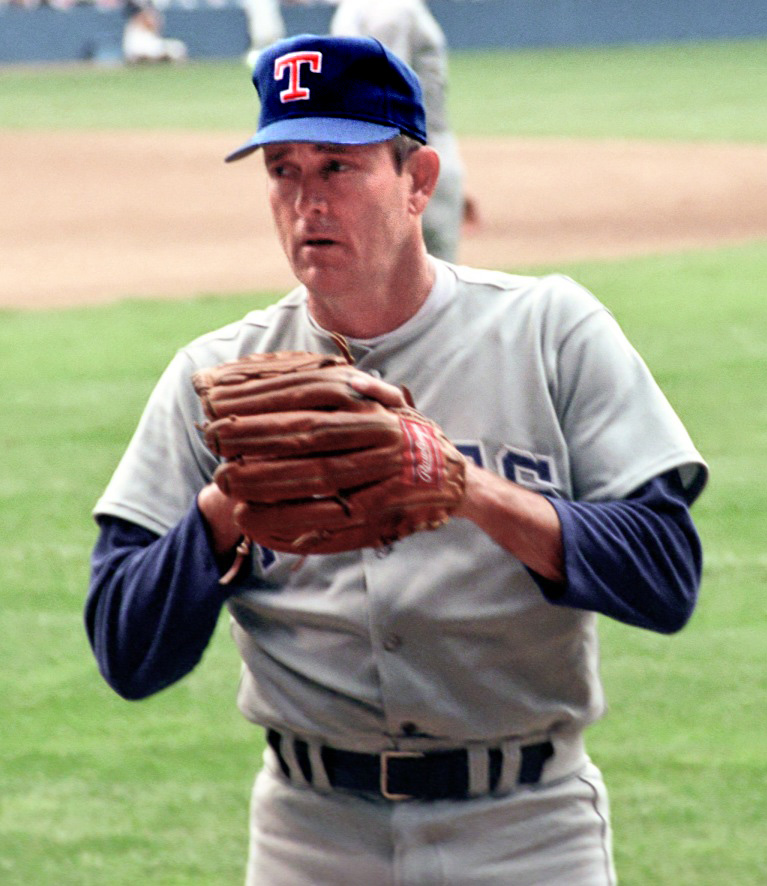
Nolan Ryan is the Rangers' career leader in batting average against (.197).

| Statistic | Player | Record | Rangers career | Ref. |
|---|---|---|---|---|
| Games played | Michael Young | 1,823 | 2000–2012 | |
| At bats | Michael Young | 7,399 | 2000–2012 | |
| Runs | Michael Young | 1,085 | 2000–2012 | |
| Hits | Michael Young | 2,230 | 2000–2012 | |
| Doubles | Michael Young | 415 | 2000–2012 | |
| Triples | Michael Young | 55 | 2000–2012 | |
| Home runs | Juan González | 372 | 1989–1999, 2002–2003 | |
| Runs batted in | Juan González | 1,180 | 1989–1999, 2002–2003 | |
| Walks | Rafael Palmeiro | 805 | 1989–1993, 1999–2003 | |
| Strikeouts | Michael Young | 1,152 | 2000–2012 | |
| Stolen bases | Elvis Andrus | 305 | 2009–2020 | |
| Caught stealing | Elvis Andrus | 105 | 2009–2020 | |
| Batting average | Al Oliver | .319 | 1978–1981 | |
| On-base percentage | Mike Hargrove | .399 | 1974–1979 | |
| Slugging percentage | Alex Rodriguez | .615 | 2001–2003 | |
| On-base plus slugging | Alex Rodriguez | 1.011 | 2001–2003 | |

=== Pitching ===
| Statistic | Player | Record | Rangers career | Ref. |
|---|---|---|---|---|
| Wins | Charlie Hough | 139 | 1980–1990 | |
| Losses | Charlie Hough | 123 | 1980–1990 | |
| Earned run average | Darold Knowles | 2.46^{‡} | 1967–1971, 1977 | |
| Games pitched | Kenny Rogers | 528 | 1989–1995, 2000–2002, 2004–2005 | |
| Games started | Charlie Hough | 313 | 1980–1990 | |
| Saves | John Wetteland | 150 | 1997–2000 | |
| Innings pitched | Charlie Hough | 2,308 | 1980–1990 | |
| Hits allowed | Kenny Rogers | 1,997 | 1989–1995, 2000–2002, 2004–2005 | |
| Runs allowed | Charlie Hough | 1,086 | 1980–1990 | |
| Earned runs allowed | Charlie Hough | 943 | 1980–1990 | |
| Home runs allowed | Charlie Hough | 238 | 1980–1990 | |
| Walks | Bobby Witt | 1,001 | 1986–1992, 1995–1998 | |
| Strikeouts | Charlie Hough | 1,452 | 1980–1990 | |
| Batting average against | Nolan Ryan | .197 | 1989–1993 | |
| WHIP | Bert Blyleven | 1.09 | 1976–1977 | |

== Single-season records ==
These are records of players with the best performance in distinct statistical categories during a single season.

=== Batting ===
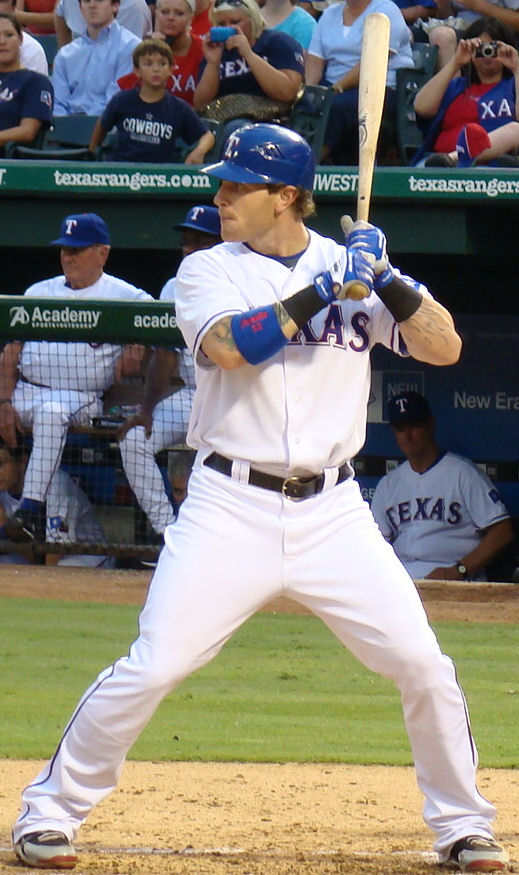
Josh Hamilton set the single-season batting average record (.359) in 2010.

| Statistic | Player | Record | Season | Ref. |
|---|---|---|---|---|
| Games played | Al Oliver | 163 | 1980 | |
| At bats | Michael Young | 691 | 2006 | |
| Runs | Alex Rodriguez | 133 | 2001 | |
| Hits | Michael Young | 221 | 2005 | |
| Singles | Mickey Rivers | 165 | 1980 | |
| Doubles | Michael Young | 52 | 2006 | |
| Triples | Rubén Sierra | 14 | 1989 | |
| Home runs | Alex Rodriguez | 57 | 2002 | |
| Runs batted in | Juan González | 157 | 1998 | |
| Walks | Frank Howard | 132^{†} | 1970 | |
| Strikeouts | Joey Gallo | 207 | 2018 | |
| Stolen bases | Bump Wills | 52 | 1978 | |
| Caught stealing | Otis Nixon | 21 | 1995 | |
| Batting average | Josh Hamilton | .359 | 2010 | |
| On-base percentage | Milton Bradley | .436 | 2008 | |
| Slugging percentage | Juan González | .643 | 1996 | |
| Consecutive games hitting streak | Gabe Kapler | 28 | 2000 | |

=== Pitching ===
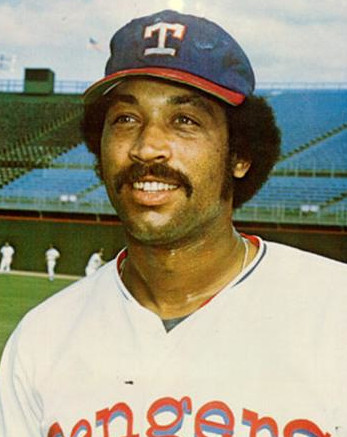
Jim Bibby (shown) and Ferguson Jenkins set the single-season record for the most games started (41) in 1974.

| Statistic | Player | Record | Season | Ref. |
|---|---|---|---|---|
| Wins | Ferguson Jenkins | 25 | 1974 | |
| Losses | Jim Bibby | 19 | 1974 | |
| Earned run average (min. 100 IP) | Jim Kern | 1.57 | 1979 | |
| Earned run average (min. 162 IP) | Mike Paul | 2.17 | 1972 | |
| Games pitched | Mitch Williams | 85 | 1987 | |
| Games started | Ferguson Jenkins | 41* | 1974 | |
| Games started | Jim Bibby | 41* | 1974 | |
| Saves | Francisco Cordero | 49 | 2004 | |
| Complete games | Ferguson Jenkins | 29 | 1974 | |
| Shutouts | Ferguson Jenkins | 6* | 1974 | |
| Shutouts | Bert Blyleven | 6* | 1976 | |
| Innings pitched | Ferguson Jenkins | 328 | 1974 | |
| Hits allowed | Ferguson Jenkins | 286 | 1974 | |
| Runs allowed | Charlie Hough | 159 | 1987 | |
| Earned runs allowed | Jim Bibby | 139 | 1974 | |
| Home runs allowed | Rick Helling | 41 | 1999 | |
| Walks | Bobby Witt | 143 | 1986 | |
| Strikeouts | Nolan Ryan | 301 | 1989 | |

== Single-game records ==
These are records of players and teams with the best performance in distinct statistical categories during a single game.

=== Batting ===
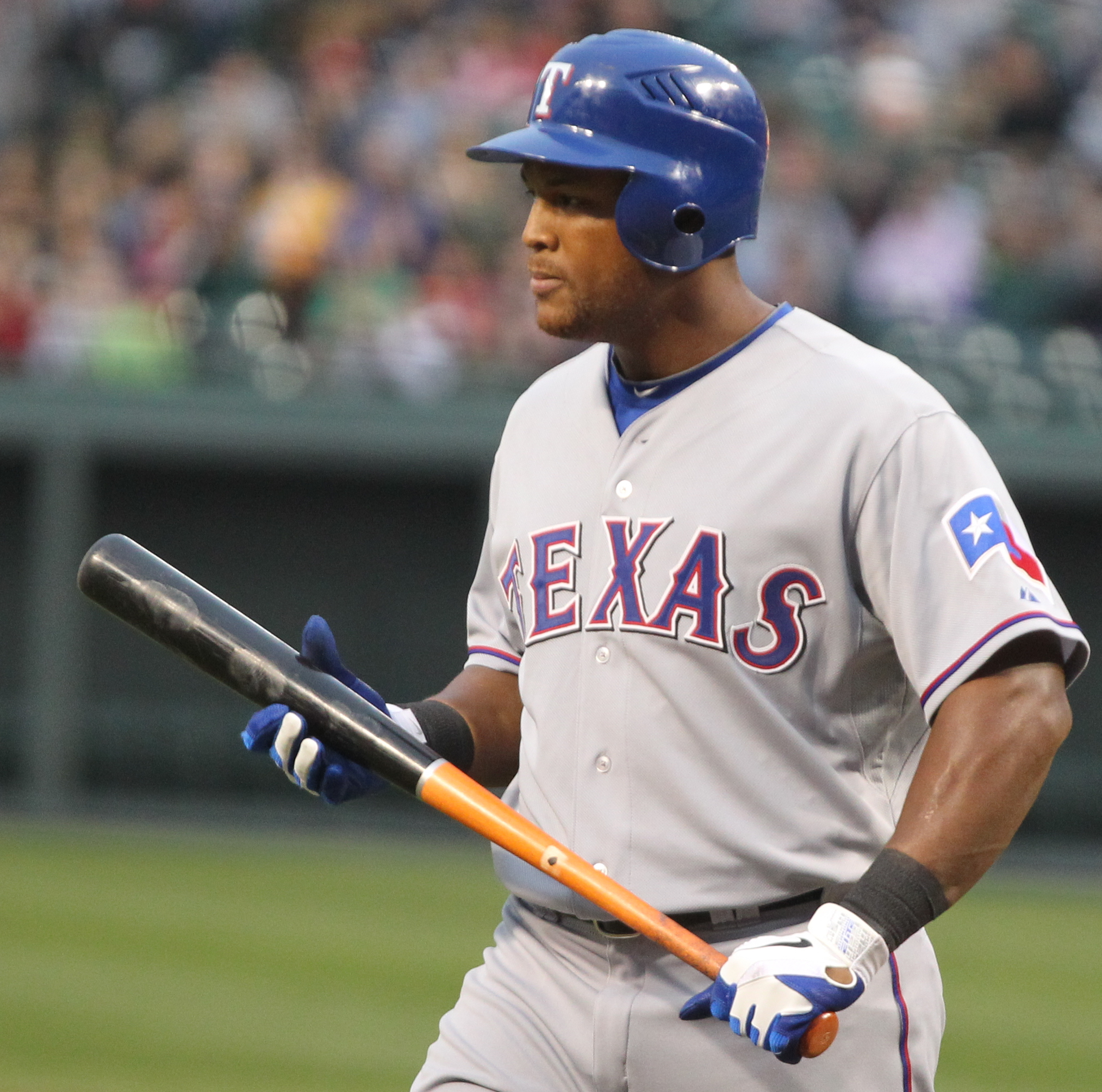
Adrián Beltré hit two home runs in a single inning on August 22, 2012, against Baltimore.

| Statistic | Player | Record | Date | Opponent |
|---|---|---|---|---|
| Most runs scored in a game (team) | — | 30 (Note: Modern major league record and the all-time American League record) | August 22, 2007 | Baltimore Orioles |
| Most home runs in a game (team) | — | 8* | May 21, 2005 | Houston Astros |
| Most home runs in a game (team) | — | 8* | June 30, 2005 | Los Angeles Angels |
| Most home runs in a game | Josh Hamilton | 4 (Note: Tied the major league record) | May 8, 2012 | Baltimore Orioles |
| Most home runs in an inning | Carl Everett | 2* (Note: Tied the major league record) | July 26, 2002 | Oakland Athletics |
| Most home runs in an inning | Adrián Beltré | 2* | August 22, 2012 | Baltimore Orioles |
| Most RBI in a game | Iván Rodríguez | 9 | April 13, 1999 | Seattle Mariners |
| Most total bases in a game | Josh Hamilton | 18 (Note: American League record) | May 8, 2012 | Baltimore Orioles |
| Most stolen bases in a game | Scarborough Green | 5 | September 28, 2000 | Seattle Mariners |

=== Pitching ===
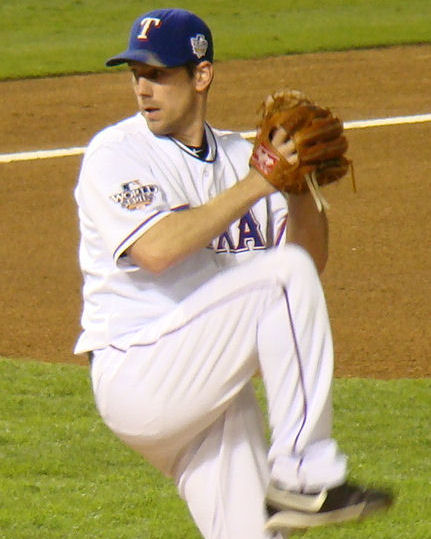
Cliff Lee twice struck out 13 batters in 9-inning games in 2010.

| Statistic | Player | Record | Date | Opponent |
|---|---|---|---|---|
| Most successive strikeouts | Andrew Heaney | 9 | August 10, 2023 | Kansas City Royals |
| Most consecutive batters retired | Kenny Rogers | 27 | July 28, 1994 | California Angels |
| Most strikeouts in an inning | Bobby Witt | 4* | August 2, 1987 | Baltimore Orioles |
| Most strikeouts in an inning | Charlie Hough | 4* | July 4, 1988 | New York Yankees |
| Most strikeouts in a 9-inning game (RHP) | Nolan Ryan | 16* | April 26, 1990 | Chicago White Sox |
| Most strikeouts in a 9-inning game (RHP) | Nolan Ryan | 16* | May 1, 1991 | Toronto Blue Jays |
| Most strikeouts in a 9-inning game (LHP) | Jamie Moyer | 13* | April 8, 1989 | Toronto Blue Jays |
| Most strikeouts in a 9-inning game (LHP) | Cliff Lee | 13* | July 26, 2010 | Oakland Athletics |
| Most strikeouts in a 9-inning game (LHP) | Cliff Lee | 13* | October 18, 2010 | New York Yankees |
| Most strikeouts in a 9-inning game (LHP) | Mike Minor | 13* | April 27, 2019 | Seattle Mariners |
| Most strikeouts in an extra-inning game | Tom Cheney | 21 (16 inn)^{†} (Note: Major league record) | September 12, 1962 | Baltimore Orioles |

== Rare feats ==
=== Hitting for the cycle ===
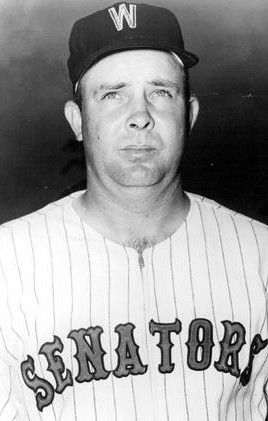
Jim King became the first player in franchise history to hit for the cycle when he did so on May 26, 1964, for the Washington Senators.

Eleven Rangers have hit for the cycle in franchise history.

| Player | Date | Opponent |
|---|---|---|
| Jim King | May 26, 1964^{†} | Boston Red Sox |
| Oddibe McDowell | July 23, 1985 | Cleveland Indians |
| Mark Teixeira | August 17, 2004 | Cleveland Indians |
| Gary Matthews Jr. | September 13, 2006 | Detroit Tigers |
| Ian Kinsler | April 15, 2009 | Baltimore Orioles |
| Bengie Molina | July 16, 2010 | Boston Red Sox |
| Adrián Beltré | August 24, 2012 | Minnesota Twins |
| Alex Ríos | September 23, 2013 | Houston Astros |
| Shin-Soo Choo | July 21, 2015 | Colorado Rockies |
| Adrián Beltré | August 3, 2015 | Houston Astros |
| Carlos Gómez | April 29, 2017 | Los Angeles Angels |
| Wyatt Langford | June 30, 2024 | Baltimore Orioles |

=== Triple plays ===
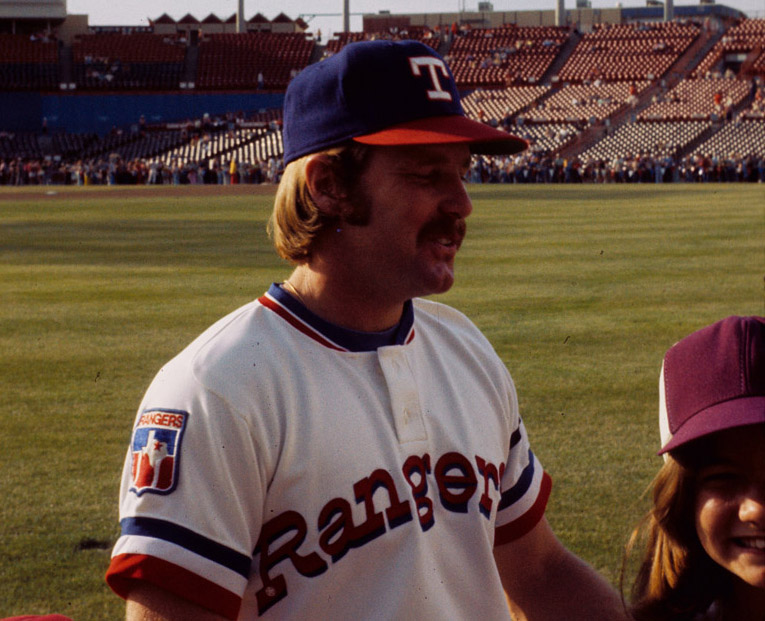
Third baseman Toby Harrah initiated the first Rangers triple play on August 8, 1977.

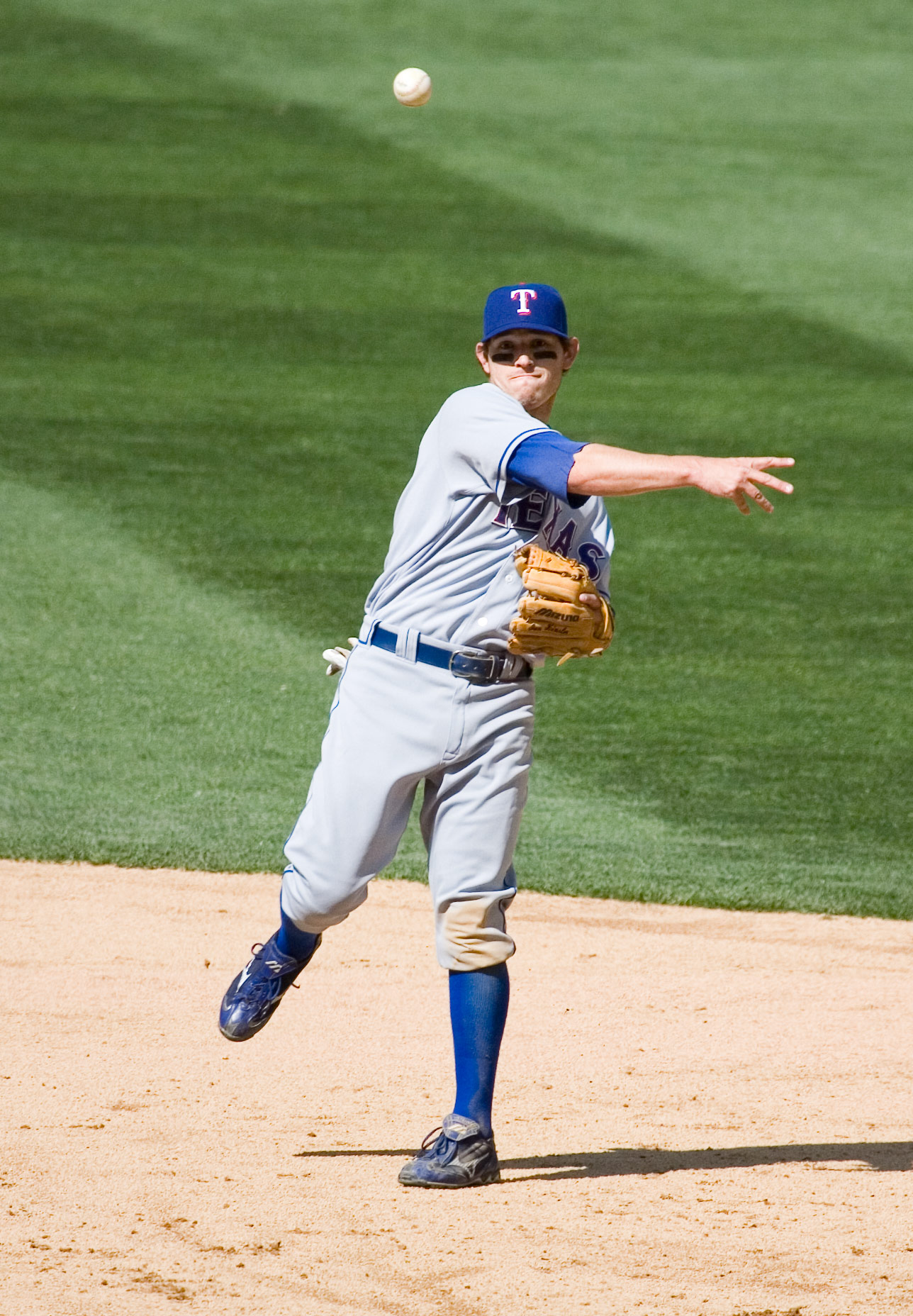
Second baseman Ian Kinsler initiated a triple play on May 20, 2009.

The Rangers have turned six triple plays in their franchise history.

| Date | Players | Opponent |
|---|---|---|
| August 8, 1977 | Toby Harrah; Bump Wills; Mike Hargrove | Oakland Athletics |
| June 17, 1999 | Mark McLemore; Royce Clayton; Lee Stevens | New York Yankees |
| August 6, 2001 | Alex Rodriguez; Randy Velarde | Boston Red Sox |
| April 14, 2002 | Kenny Rogers; Alex Rodriguez; Iván Rodríguez; Hank Blalock; Kenny Rogers; Michael Young | Seattle Mariners |
| May 20, 2009 | Ian Kinsler; Elvis Andrus | Detroit Tigers |
| August 16, 2018 | Jurickson Profar; Rougned Odor | Los Angeles Angels |

== See also ==
- List of Texas Rangers no-hitters
