= Jurickson Profar =

Curaçaoan baseball player (born 1993)

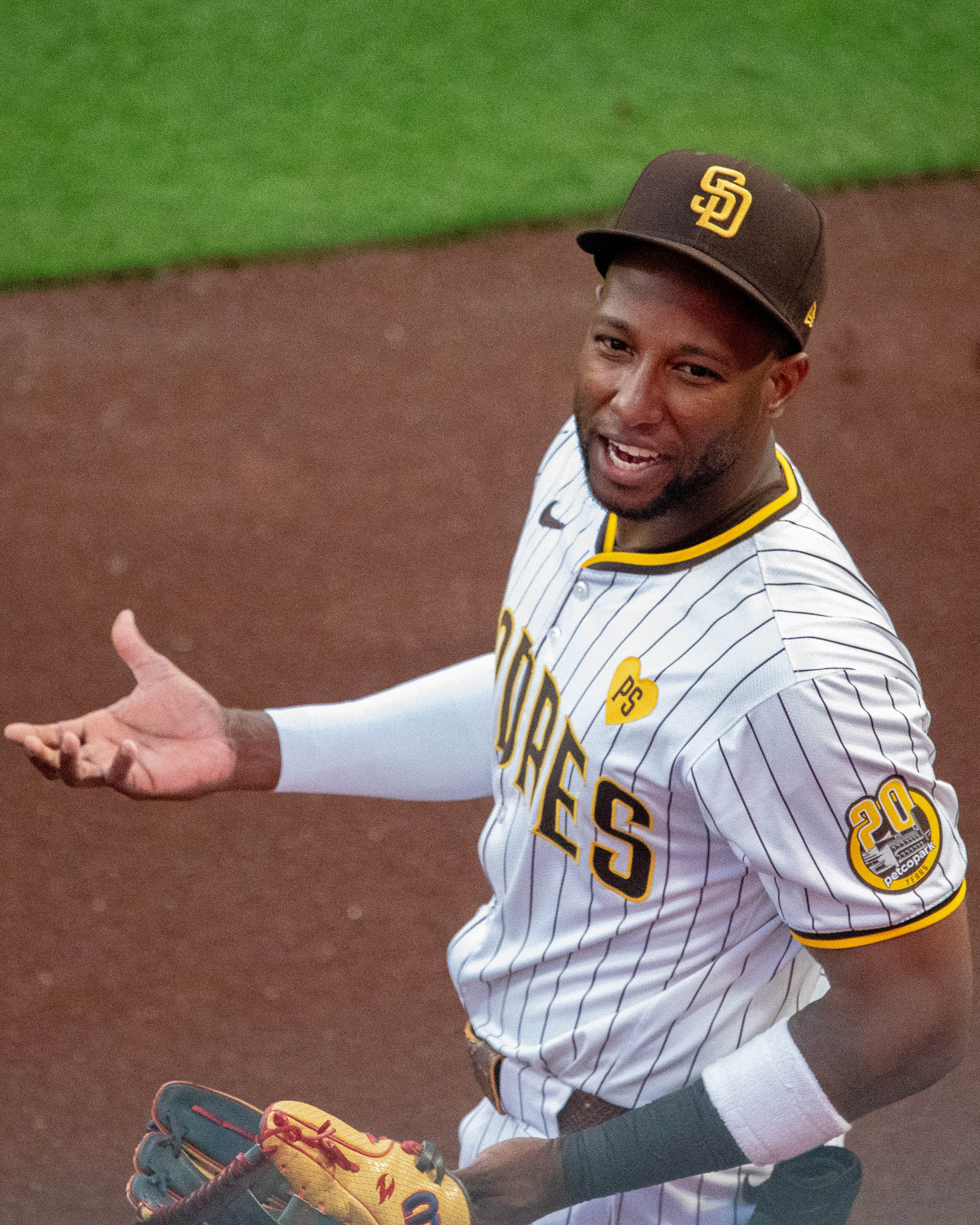
- Profar with the San Diego Padres in 2024

Atlanta Braves – No. 17
- Outfielder
- Born: February 20, 1993 (age 33); Willemstad, Curaçao
- Bats: Switch Throws: Right

MLB debut
- September 2, 2012, for the Texas Rangers

MLB statistics (through 2025 season)
- Batting average: .245
- Hits: 995
- Home runs: 125
- Runs batted in: 487
- Stats at Baseball Reference

Teams
- Texas Rangers (2012–2013, 2016–2018); Oakland Athletics (2019); San Diego Padres (2020–2022); Colorado Rockies (2023); San Diego Padres (2023–2024); Atlanta Braves (2025)

Career highlights and awards
- All-Star (2024); Silver Slugger Award (2024)

Jurickson Barthelomeus Profar (born February 20, 1993) is a Curaçaoan professional baseball outfielder for the Atlanta Braves of Major League Baseball (MLB). He has previously played in MLB for the Texas Rangers, Oakland Athletics, San Diego Padres, and Colorado Rockies. He has played on the Netherlands national team in international competition.

Profar was born in Willemstad and has played baseball from a young age, representing Curaçao at the Little League World Series in 2004 and 2005. In 2009, when he was 16 years old, Profar signed with the Rangers as an international free agent. He was called up to the major leagues in 2012 and received partial playing time in his first two seasons as a utility player. After suffering a shoulder injury, Profar missed two full seasons and did not rejoin the Rangers until mid-2016. Texas continued to use Profar sparingly until 2018, when he played more than 100 games in a season for the first time in his career.

After ten years in the Rangers organization, Profar was traded to the Athletics for the 2019 season. He received a more static role at second base with Oakland, but he was traded to the Padres after struggling on both offense and defense. Upon arriving in San Diego, Profar was transitioned from a utility infielder to an outfielder, primarily playing in left field. In 2022, he set career highs in plate appearances and hits. Following a stint with the Rockies, Profar rejoined the Padres and was named to the All-Star Game and won a Silver Slugger Award in 2024. He signed with Atlanta as a free agent but was suspended for half of the 2025 season and all of the 2026 season after testing positive for performance-enhancing substances.

== Early years ==
Profar participated in both the 2004 and 2005 Little League World Series. He helped the Pabao Little League team from Willemstad, Curaçao, beat the Conejo Valley East Little League team from Thousand Oaks, California, to win the championship in 2004. He helped lead the team to the championship game again in 2005, but this team lost to West Oahu Little League from ʻEwa Beach, Hawaii.

== Professional career ==
=== Minor leagues ===
Profar signed with the Texas Rangers on July 2, 2009. Other teams wanted to sign Profar as a pitcher, but the Rangers signed him as a shortstop, his preferred position. He spent his first professional season in 2010 playing for the Spokane Indians. He batted .250 with four home runs and 23 runs batted in (RBI) in 63 games.

Prior to the 2011 season, Profar was ranked by Baseball America as the Rangers' second best overall prospect and the 74th best overall. He played the 2011 season for the Hickory Crawdads. He was selected to represent the Rangers at the 2011 All-Star Futures Game. Baseball America ranked him as the 12th best prospect in baseball during their midseason top 50 list. He finished the season hitting .286/.390/.493 with 12 home runs and 65 runs batted in and was named the South Atlantic League's most valuable player. He was named the shortstop on Baseball America's 2011 Minor League All-Star team. He hit a home run off Jake Odorizzi in the 2012 All-Star Futures Game.

=== Texas Rangers ===
==== 2012 – 2013 ====
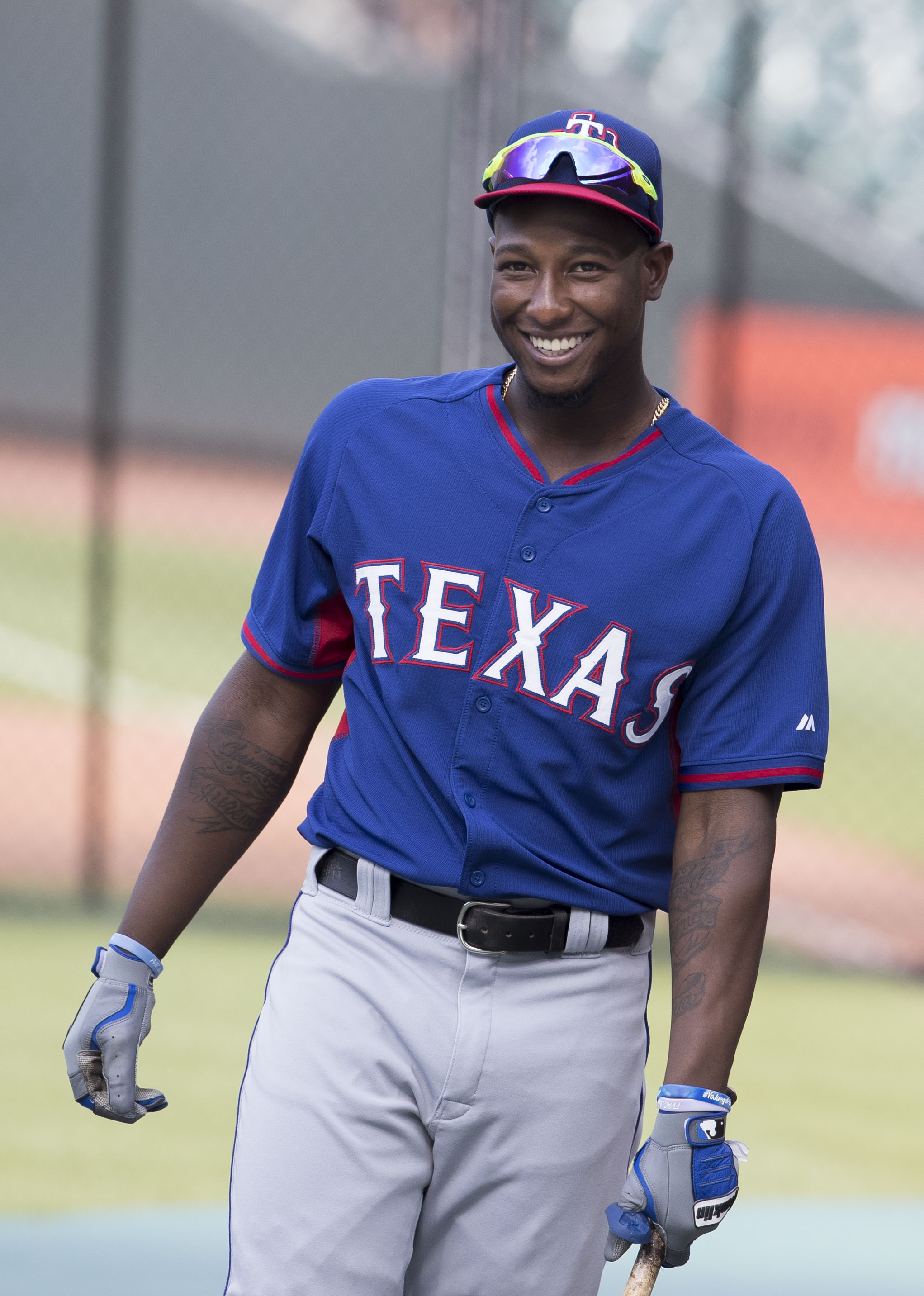
Profar with the Rangers in 2016

On August 31, 2012, Profar was called up to the Rangers as major league rosters expanded and as a possible postseason addition. He is the first player born in 1993 to play in the majors and was the youngest player active in the major leagues. In his major league debut, Profar started at second base in place of Ian Kinsler, who was out due to back stiffness, and hit a home run off of Zach McAllister in his first major league at bat. He then later doubled in his second at-bat, and went 2-for-4 for the game. In nine games, Profar batted .176 with a home run and two RBIs while playing five games at second base and three games at shortstop.

Profar started the 2013 season in Triple-A Round Rock. In May 2013, the Rangers called up Profar after putting Kinsler on the 15-day disabled list. In a May 26 game at Seattle, he hit his second career home run off Hisashi Iwakuma while batting leadoff for the first time in his major league career. In 88 games, Profar batted .234 with six home runs and 26 RBIs. He played four positions in 2013 with shortstop, second base, third base, and left field while also serving as the designated hitter for 20 games.

==== 2014 – 2016 ====
After the 2013 season, the Rangers traded Kinsler, anticipating that Profar would become the Rangers' starting second baseman.

Profar started the 2014 season on the 60-day disabled list, and was not expected to return until mid-June. On May 22, the Rangers organization announced Profar had reinjured his shoulder, and as a result missed the entire 2014 season. On February 23, 2015, he underwent surgery on his shoulder and missed the entire 2015 season.

After missing a total of two seasons due to the shoulder injury, Profar was optioned to the team's Triple-A affiliate Round Rock Express on March 21, 2016. On May 27, the Rangers called Profar up to the majors as a replacement for second baseman Rougned Odor, who was suspended by MLB for seven games for punching the Toronto Blue Jays' José Bautista. Profar went 1-for-5 in his return against the Pittsburgh Pirates the same day. He hit his first home run of the season on May 31, 2016, against the Cleveland Indians. His performance during Odor's suspension earned him a regular roster spot. By June, Hanser Alberto was optioned back to Round Rock. Profar played five positions in the field (left field, shortstop, first base, second base, and third base) while also serving as the designated hitter for six games.

==== 2017 – 2018 ====
In 2017, Profar lost playing time in left field to Ryan Rua and Delino DeShields Jr. In 2018, Profar made the Rangers' major league roster out of spring training as a utility infielder. On April 16, Profar left the game after being upended after a slide. Profar was placed on concussion protocol shortly thereafter. In his first full season at the Major League level, Profar hit .254/.335/.458 with 20 home runs, while appearing as a left fielder, shortstop, first baseman, second baseman, and third baseman.

Profar was named the 2018 Richard Durrett Hardest Working Man Award winner by the DFW chapter of the BBWAA.

=== Oakland Athletics ===
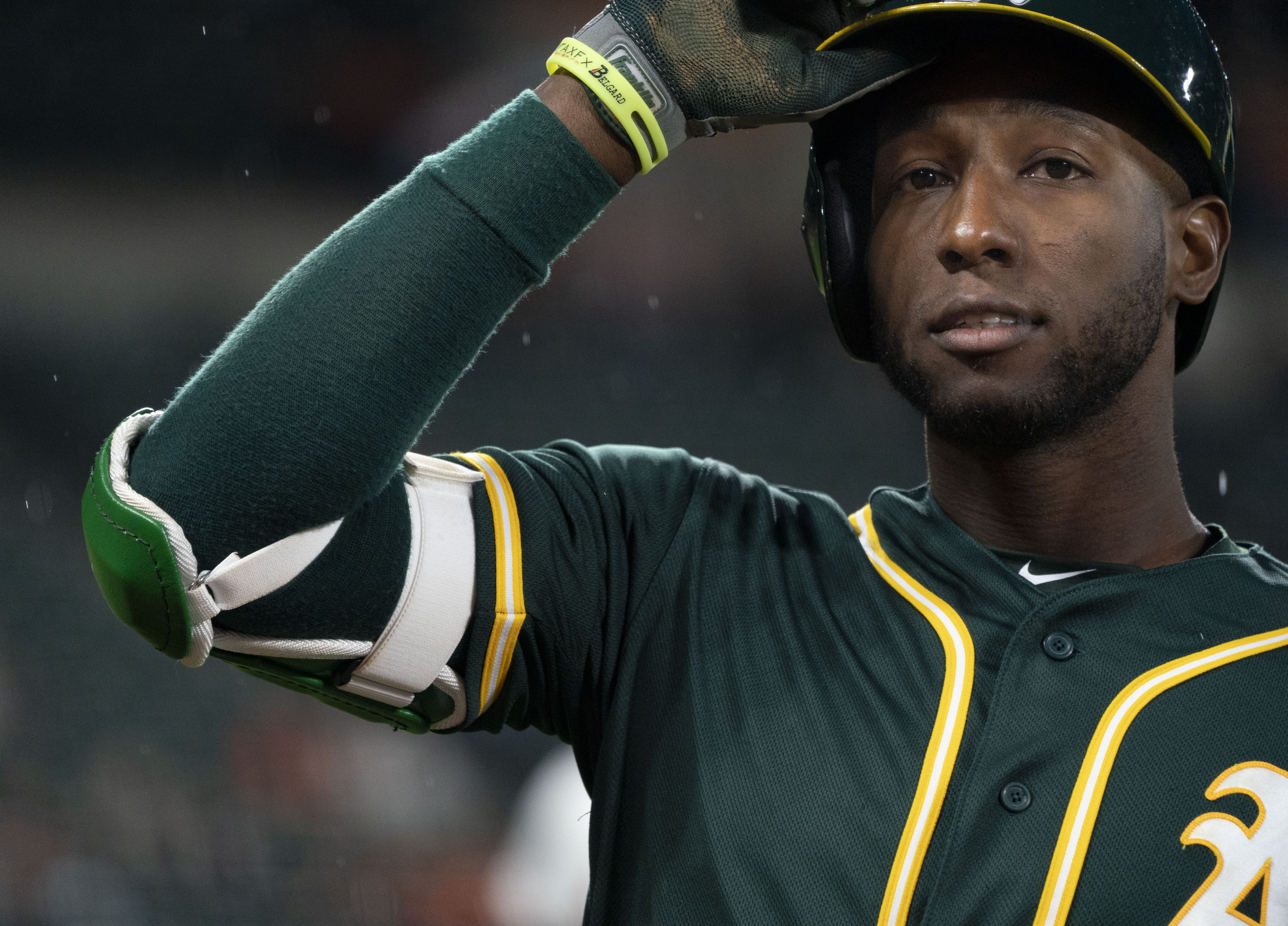
Profar with the Athletics in 2019

On December 21, 2018, the Rangers traded Profar to the Oakland Athletics in a three-team deal in which the Rangers acquired Brock Burke, Kyle Bird, Yoel Espinal, Eli White, and $750,000 of international signing bonus pool space and the Tampa Bay Rays acquired Emilio Pagán, Rollie Lacy, and a competitive balance pick in the 2019 MLB draft. The Athletics played Profar almost exclusively at second base to fill the void left by free agent Jed Lowrie. After struggling on defense and to keep his batting average above .200, Profar was relegated to a platoon role when the Athletics called up Corban Joseph. On defense in 2019, he had a -10 Defensive Runs Saved (DRS) rating, the lowest in the major leagues among second basemen.

=== San Diego Padres ===
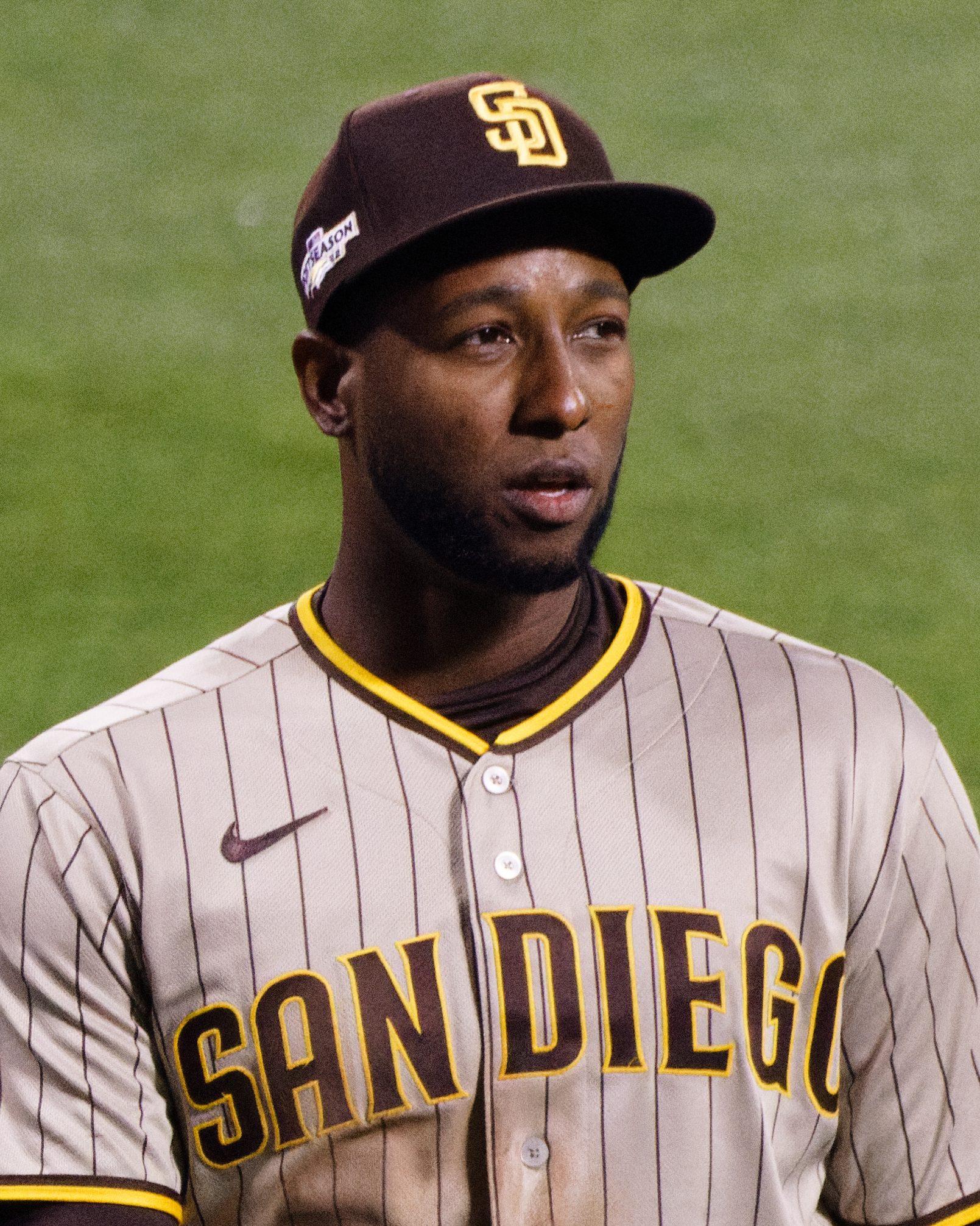
Profar with the Padres in 2022

On December 2, 2019, the Athletics traded Profar to the San Diego Padres in exchange for Austin Allen and a player to be named later or cash considerations.

In 2020 for the Padres, Profar slashed .278/.343/.428 with seven home runs and 25 RBIs in 56 games. He played 39 games in the outfield while playing second base for 17 games and first base once.

On January 27, 2021, Profar re-signed with the Padres on a three-year, $21 million contract. Profar struggled in 2021 with a slash line of .227/.329/.320. In the off-season, he changed his usual regimen, and his batting stance as well.

Following a collision with teammate CJ Abrams on July 7, 2022, Profar collapsed while walking off the field and was placed on the 7-day injured list under the concussion protocol. On August 9, Profar made a diving catch in the ninth inning, saving at least one run; a run which would have given the lead to the Padres' opponent, the San Francisco Giants. In the bottom of the inning, Profar singled before teammate Manny Machado hit a game-winning home run. On November 7, Profar opted out of his contract and became a free agent.

=== Colorado Rockies ===
On March 21, 2023, Profar signed a one-year, $7.75 million contract with the Colorado Rockies. In 111 games with Colorado, he hit .236/.316/.364 with 8 home runs and 39 RBI. On August 27, Profar was released by Colorado following the promotion of Hunter Goodman.

=== San Diego Padres (second stint) ===
On September 1, 2023, Profar signed a minor league contract to return to the Padres organization. After four games for the Triple-A El Paso Chihuahuas, the Padres selected Profar's contract on September 8, adding him to the major league roster. He became a free agent following the season.

On February 12, 2024, Profar re-signed with the Padres, a one-year deal guaranteeing $1 million, along with a possible additional $1.5 million in incentives. Profar went on to have the best year of his career yet, posting a career high .839 OPS. He also made the MLB All-Star Team for the first time.

=== Atlanta Braves ===
On January 23, 2025, Profar signed a three-year, $42 million contract with the Atlanta Braves. On March 31, 2025, he was suspended for 80 games after testing positive for a performance-enhancing drug known as human chorionic gonadotropin, which also made him ineligible to participate in the postseason. Profar returned from an 80 game suspension on July 2, and went 2-for-4 with a RBI home run against the Los Angeles Angels.

On March 3, 2026, Profar was suspended for the entire 2026 season and postseason after failing another performance-enhancing substance test. He forfeited his annual salary of roughly $15 million. Profar and his agent immediately appealed the suspension via a grievance filing by the MLB Players Association. On March 19, the suspension was upheld by MLB. He was the seventh player to be given a 162-game suspension for a second PED violation.

== International career ==
After the Netherlands advanced to the semi-finals for the 2013 World Baseball Classic, manager Hensley Meulens made a public plea to have Profar on the Dutch roster, as he was born in the Dutch Caribbean island of Curaçao. The Rangers gave permission for Profar to be on the roster shortly after, although he appeared in only one game, going 0-for-3 with a walk in a 4-1 loss to the Dominican Republic. Profar again represented Netherlands at the WBC in 2017 and 2023. Profar committed to represent the Netherlands in the 2026 World Baseball Classic, but was declared ineligible due to his PED suspension in MLB.

== Personal life ==
Profar has two younger brothers. Juremi signed with the Texas Rangers in 2012 and currently plays for the Karachi Monarchs in Baseball United. Their younger brother Jurdrick signed with the Chicago White Sox in January 2024. All three brothers have represented Curaçao in the Little League World Series.

Profar's son was born in 2017.

In 2025, indie-folk singer-songwriter Cousin Wolf released a song titled "Jurickson Profar" as part of an album called Nine Innings.

== See also ==
- List of Major League Baseball players from the Netherlands Antilles
- List of Major League Baseball players suspended for performance-enhancing drugs
- List of Major League Baseball players with a home run in their first major league at bat
- List of Texas Rangers team records
- San Diego Padres award winners and league leaders
- Texas Rangers award winners and league leaders
