= Khris Davis =

American baseball player (born 1987)

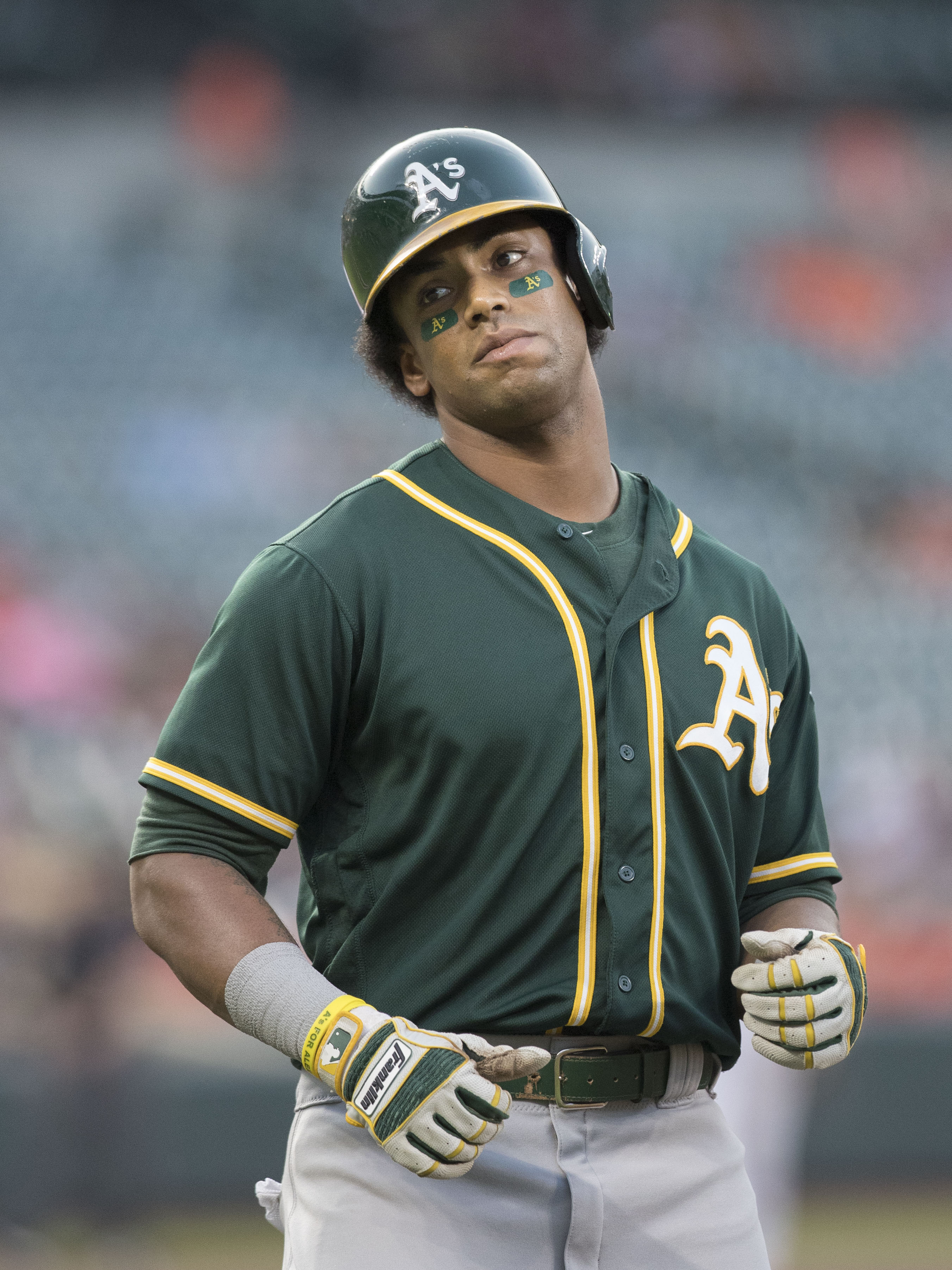
- Davis with the Oakland Athletics in 2017
- Left fielder / Designated hitter
- Born: December 21, 1987 (age 38); Lakewood, California, U.S.
- Batted: Right Threw: Right

MLB debut
- April 1, 2013, for the Milwaukee Brewers

Last MLB appearance
- October 3, 2021, for the Oakland Athletics

MLB statistics
- Batting average: .242
- Home runs: 221
- Runs batted in: 590
- Stats at Baseball Reference

Teams
- Milwaukee Brewers (2013–2015); Oakland Athletics (2016–2020); Texas Rangers (2021); Oakland Athletics (2021)

Career highlights and awards
- MLB home run leader (2018)

Khristopher Adrian Davis (born December 21, 1987), nicknamed “Khrush”, is an American former professional baseball left fielder and designated hitter. He played in Major League Baseball (MLB) for the Milwaukee Brewers, Oakland Athletics and Texas Rangers. Davis led MLB with 48 home runs in the 2018 season.

== Background ==
Davis was born in Lakewood, California. He attended Cactus High School before transferring to play baseball at Deer Valley High School, where he was twice named an All-State player. During his senior season at Deer Valley, Davis hit .592 with 10 home runs and 50 RBIs to lead the team to a state title. Davis attended California State University, Fullerton, where he played college baseball for the Cal State Fullerton Titans as an outfielder, designated hitter, and pinch hitter. In his junior season, Davis hit .328 with 16 home runs and 58 RBIs.

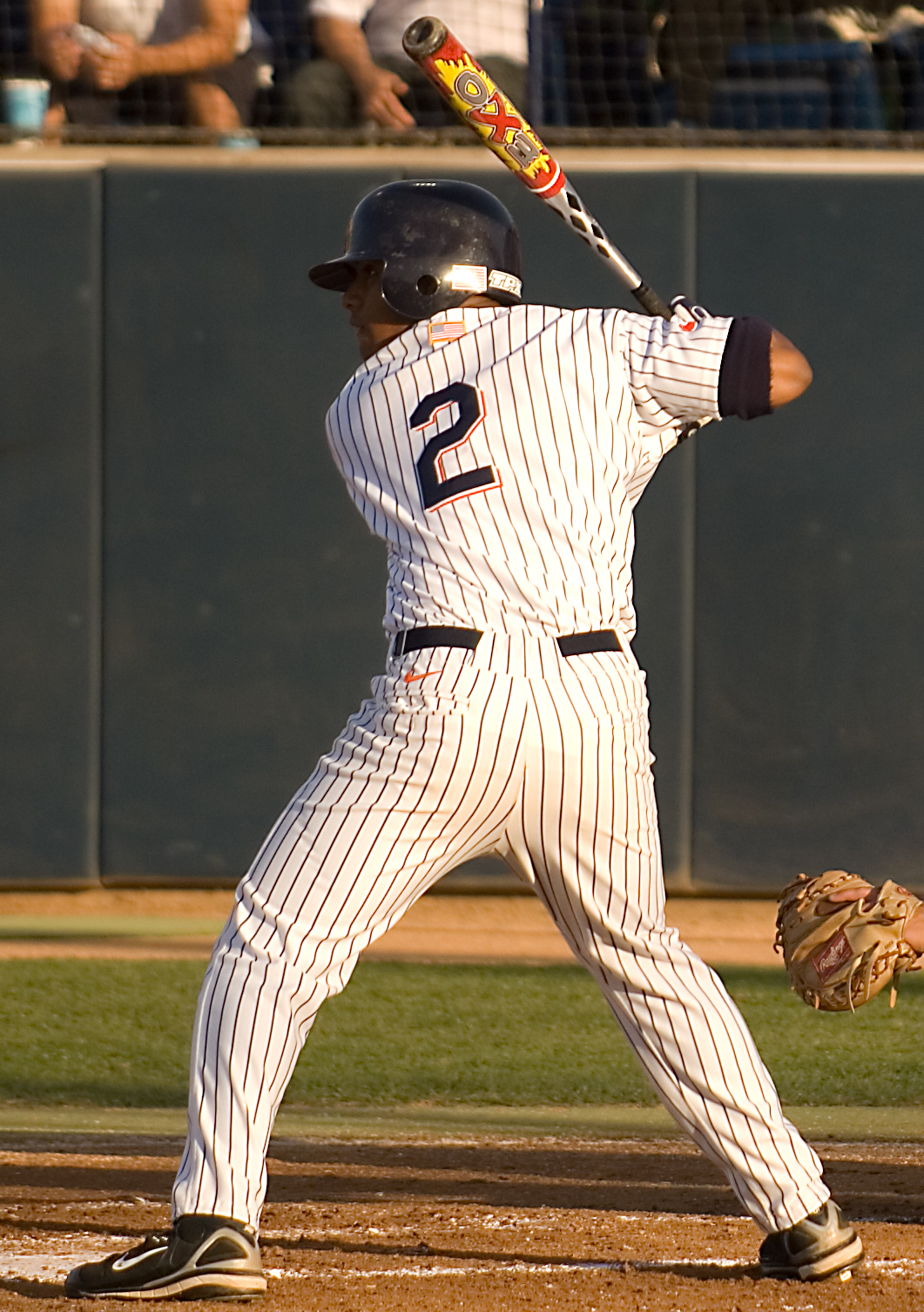
Davis with the Titans in 2007

== Professional career ==
=== Draft ===
In 2006, Davis was drafted by the Washington Nationals in the 29th round; he did not sign with the team but opted to play college baseball. He later was drafted by the Milwaukee Brewers in the seventh round of the 2009 Major League Baseball draft.

=== Minor leagues ===
Davis began his minor league career in 2009. He played in one game for the Helena Brewers of the Rookie-level Pioneer League club and ten games for the Arizona League Brewers; Davis combined for two home runs and a .237 batting average. He spent the entire 2010 season playing for the Wisconsin Timber Rattlers of the Single–A Midwest League. He played in 128 games with 22 home runs and a .280 batting average.

To start the 2011 season, Davis was promoted to the Brevard County Manatees of the High–A Florida State League. After 90 games, he was promoted to the Huntsville Stars of the Double–A Southern League; Davis played 35 games with the team. In 125 games that year, he batted .280 with 84 runs batted in (RBI) and 17 home runs.

In 2012, Davis returned to the Arizona League Brewers and the Huntsville Stars for six and 44 games respectively. The Brewers promoted Davis to their top level below the Major Leagues with the Nashville Sounds of the Triple–A Pacific Coast League. He played in 32 games for the Sounds with a .310 batting average.

=== Milwaukee Brewers ===
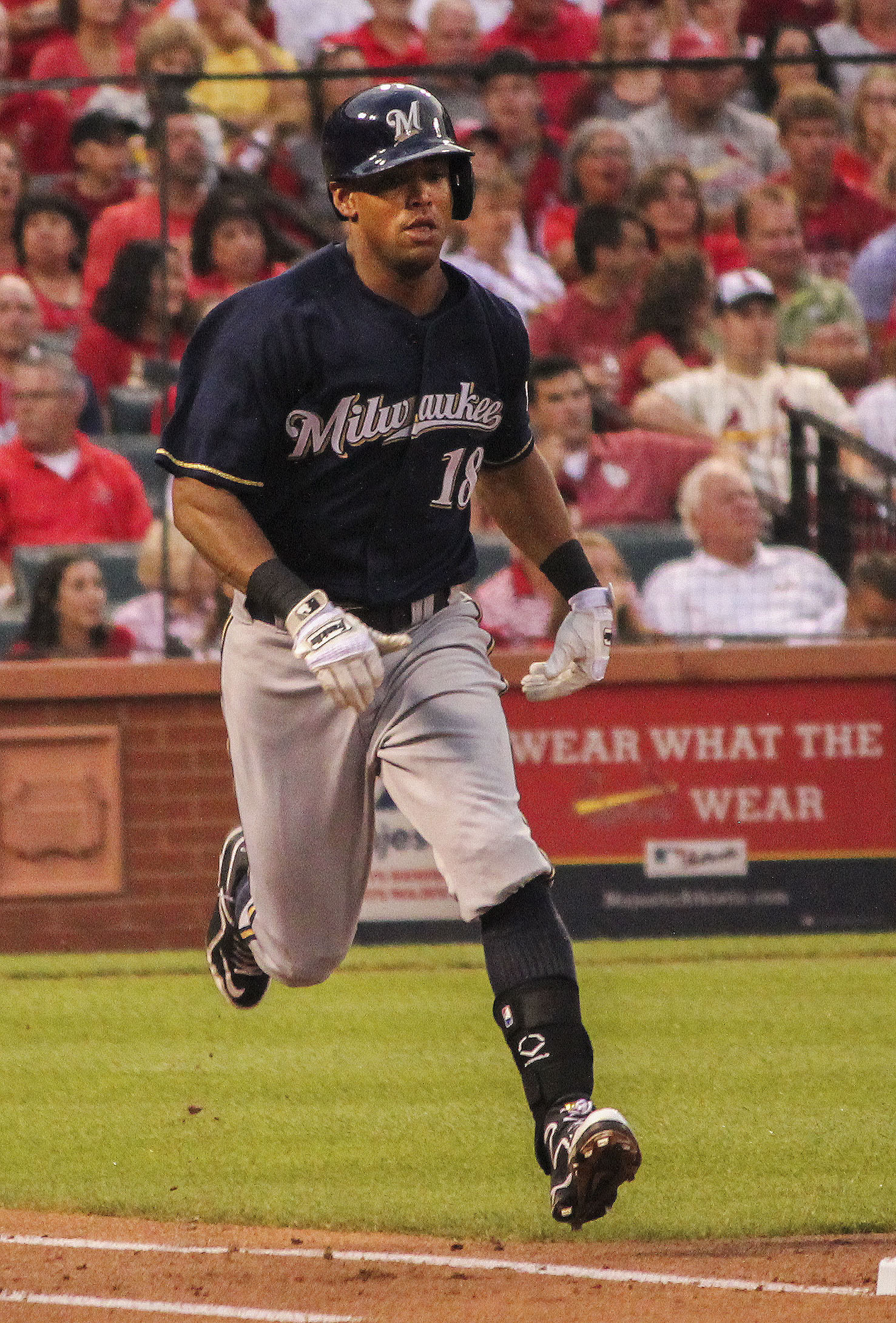
Davis playing for the Milwaukee Brewers in 2014

The Brewers added Davis to their 40-man roster during the 2012–13 offseason. After a productive spring training, Davis made the final roster cut and made his major league debut on opening day, grounding out in a pinch-hit appearance. Five days later, Davis made his first major league start in left field and recorded his first major league hit, a double off Patrick Corbin of the Arizona Diamondbacks. After a poor start that saw him bat just .188, Davis was optioned to Nashville.

Davis was recalled in mid-July, and after Ryan Braun's suspension due to performance-enhancing drug use, became the Brewers' starting left fielder down the stretch. He hit his first major league home run at Miller Park on July 23 off Colt Hynes of the San Diego Padres. Davis ended the year with 11 home runs in 136 at-bats, with a slugging percentage of .596.

Davis' rookie performance was enough to encourage Brewers management to trade right fielder Norichika Aoki to Kansas City and move Ryan Braun from left to right field, opening up an everyday role for Davis. After a slow start, batting .219 with an on-base percentage of .250 and a slugging percentage of.388 through May 20, Davis hit four home runs in six games. At the All-Star Break, Davis led the Brewers with 15 home runs. In 144 games for the Brewers, Davis hit .244 with 22 home runs and 69 RBIs.

Davis was once again named the starting left fielder for the Brewers during the 2015 season and batted .247 with 27 home runs and 66 RBIs in 121 games.

=== Oakland Athletics ===
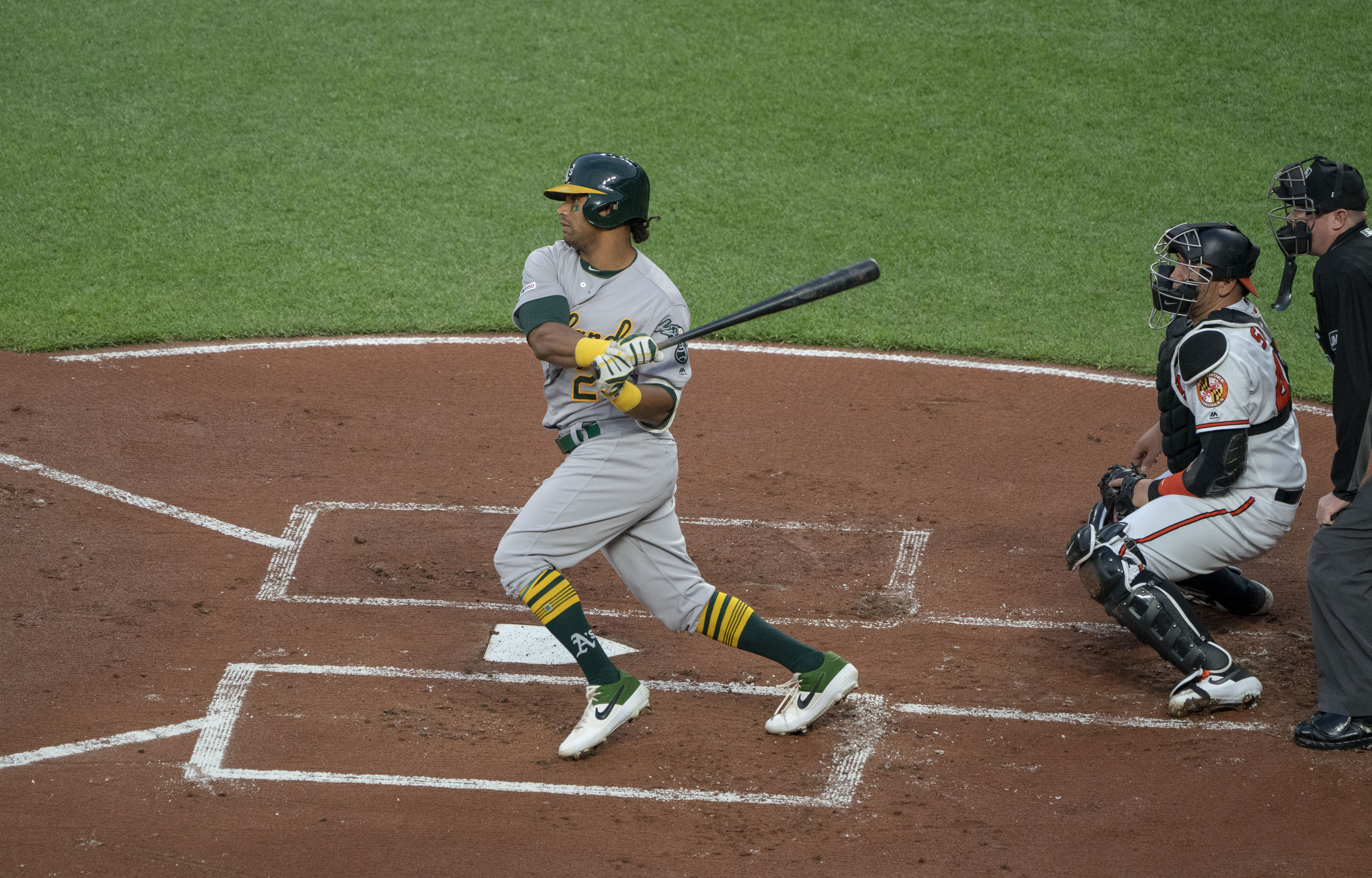
Khris Davis in 2019

On February 12, 2016, the Brewers traded Davis to the Oakland Athletics for Jacob Nottingham and Bubba Derby. On May 17 in a game against the Texas Rangers, Davis hit three home runs, including a walk-off grand slam for the third. This was only the second time this has happened in MLB history. On August 14, 2016, Davis hit his 30th home run of the season, a two-run homer against the Seattle Mariners. On September 18, 2016, Davis hit his 39th and 40th home runs of the season in a game against the Rangers. He added two more home runs to conclude the season. He also contributed 102 RBIs for the season, becoming the first player in the franchise to reach 100 or more RBIs since the 2006 season, when Frank Thomas had 114 RBIs for the Athletics.

Davis hit two home runs in Oakland's 2017 season opener on April 3, the second Athletics player to do so, and the first since Jason Giambi in 2000. Davis hit 43 home runs total in the 2017 season and contributed 110 RBIs, being the first Athletics player to have back-to-back 40 home run seasons.

In 2018, his 48 home runs led all of MLB. He also batted .247 for the fourth consecutive season. His 123 RBIs were the second-most in baseball behind J. D. Martinez. For the season, he had the lowest line drive percentage of all major league hitters (15.9%).

In 2019 he batted .220/.293/.387 with 23 home runs and 73 RBIs. He swung at the highest percentage of pitches inside the strike zone of all American League batters (82.2%). In 2020, Davis continued with his struggles offensively, hitting an even .200 with only 2 home runs and 10 RBI.

=== Texas Rangers ===
On February 6, 2021, the Athletics traded Davis, Jonah Heim and Dane Acker to the Texas Rangers in exchange for Elvis Andrus and Aramis Garcia. He was designated for assignment on June 8 after hitting .157/.262/.333 in 22 games for Texas. Davis was released by the Rangers on June 13.

=== Oakland Athletics (second stint) ===
On August 4, 2021, Davis signed a minor league deal with the Oakland Athletics. He was assigned to the Arizona Complex League Athletics. After going 1-for-11 with the ACL Athletics, he was promoted to the Triple-A Las Vegas Aviators. There, he hit .333 with 10 home runs and 25 RBIs over 16 games. On September 1, the Athletics selected Davis' contract when the rosters expanded.

=== Diablos Rojos del México ===
On April 5, 2022, Davis signed with the Diablos Rojos del México of the Mexican League. In 12 games, he batted .119/.213/.167 with 2 RBI. Davis was released on May 18.

=== Wild Health Genomes ===
On June 2, 2022, Davis signed with the Wild Health Genomes of the Atlantic League of Professional Baseball. In 54 games for the Genomes, he hit .271/.356/.585 with 17 home runs and 46 RBI. Davis was released on September 16.

== Personal life ==
Davis' father, Rodney, played in the Los Angeles Dodgers organization and has served as a scout for the Dodgers and Arizona Diamondbacks. He now serves as the head baseball coach at Whittier Christian High School in La Habra, Ca. His mother, Sonia Davis (née Alarcón), was born in Culiacán, but grew up in Ensenada.
