= Pembroke Pines Charter High School =

Coordinates: 26°1′55″N 80°22′30″W

Location
- 17189 Sheridan Street; Pembroke Pines, Florida 33331; United States

Information
- Grades: 9–12
- Enrollment: 1,824
- Colors: Black, gray, and maroon
- Mascot: Jaguars
- State of Florida A+ Plan: FAST School Grade: A
- Website: hs.pinescharter.net

Pembroke Pines Charter High School is a charter school in the United States. It is funded and administered by the City of Pembroke Pines, as opposed to the Broward County School Board.

In 2005–2006, PPCHS received an A grade from the State of Florida, after the school's D grade the previous year. In 2007, PPCHS was named National Charter School of the year. In 2014, PPCHS again received an A grade.

== Athletics ==
Pembroke Pines has earned multiple state championships:

=== Boys ===
- Basketball: 2024 (Class 6A), 2026 (Class 5A)

== Student Traditions ==
A notable student tradition is the "shirt throwing ceremony," occurring on the last class day for graduating seniors. The tradition dates back to the first graduating class. Students were upset that they had to wear uniforms––unlike their classmates in other area high schools––so they conspired to run outside during the last day of class and throw their shirts into the trees surrounding the fountain in the center of campus. Ever since, every graduating class has participated in the shirt throwing ceremony. Afterwards, students run into the student parking lot to celebrate their last day at campus.

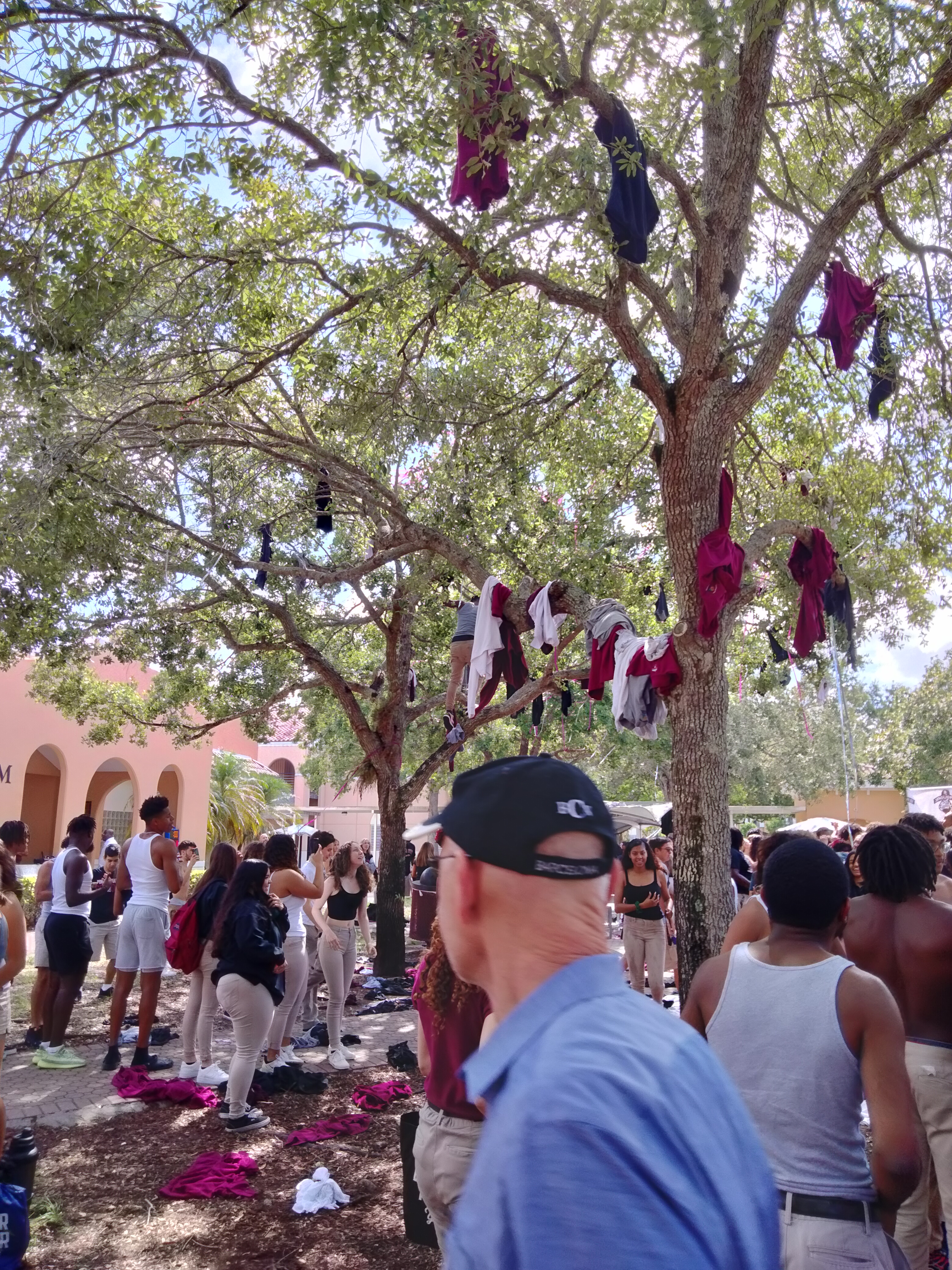
Shirt throwing ceremony for the class of 2022.

== Notable alumni ==
- Aramis Garcia, Major League Baseball player for the San Francisco Giants
