= Elvis Andrus =

Venezuelan-American baseball player (born 1988)

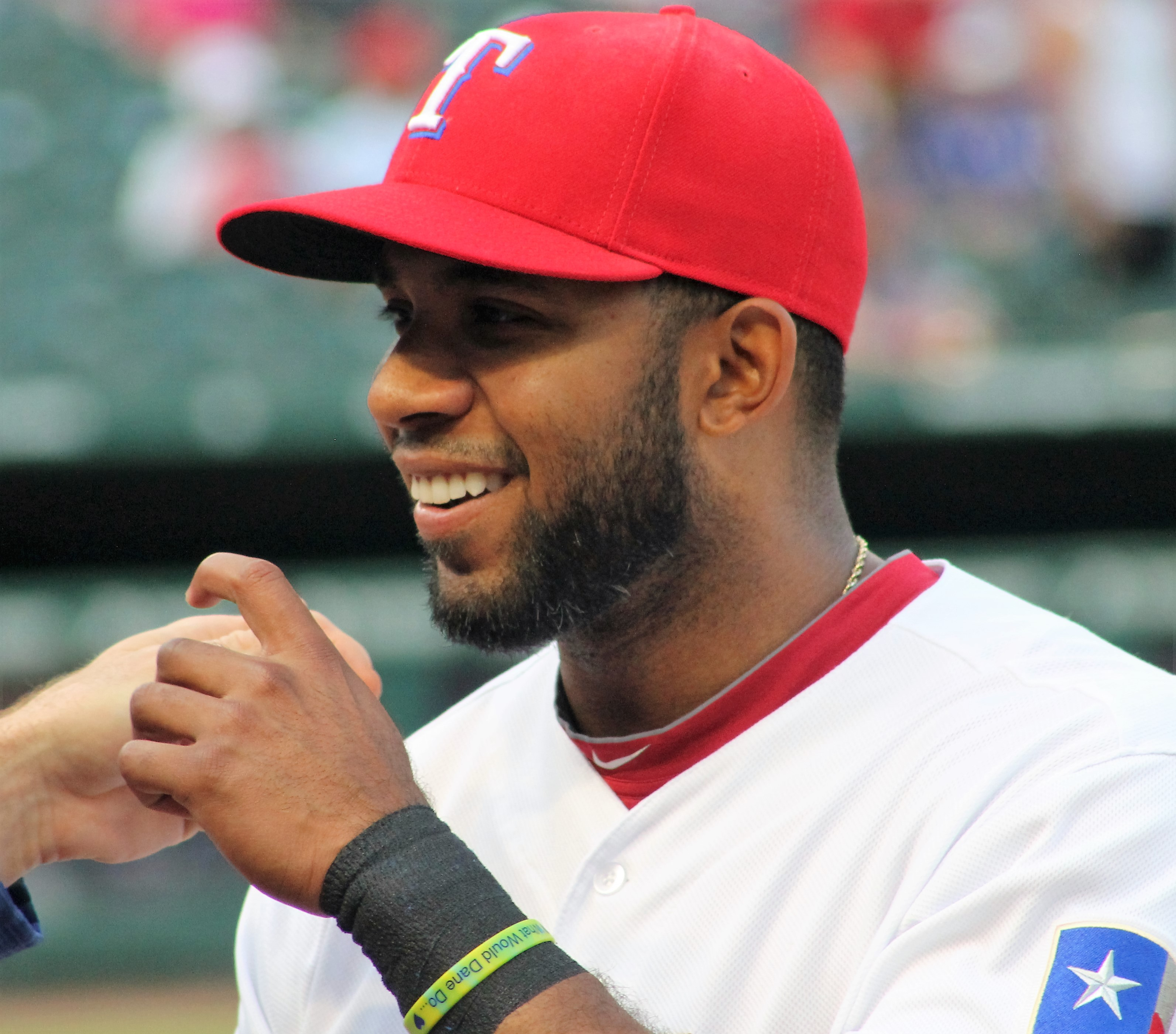
- Andrus with the Texas Rangers in 2016
- Shortstop
- Born: August 26, 1988 (age 37); Maracay, Venezuela
- Batted: Right Threw: Right

MLB debut
- April 6, 2009, for the Texas Rangers

Last MLB appearance
- October 1, 2023, for the Chicago White Sox

MLB statistics
- Batting average: .269
- Hits: 2,091
- Home runs: 102
- Runs batted in: 775
- Stolen bases: 347
- Stats at Baseball Reference

Teams
- Texas Rangers (2009–2020); Oakland Athletics (2021–2022); Chicago White Sox (2022–2023)

Career highlights and awards
- 2× All-Star (2010, 2012); Texas Rangers Hall of Fame

Elvis Augusto Andrus Torres (born August 26, 1988) is a Venezuelan-American former professional baseball shortstop. He played in Major League Baseball (MLB) for the Texas Rangers, Oakland Athletics, and Chicago White Sox. He was a two-time All-Star.

Andrus was born in the city of Maracay in Venezuela. As an international prospect, he signed a contract with the Atlanta Braves at the age of 16 in 2005. Entering 2007, he was rated by Baseball America as the No. 2 prospect in the Atlanta Braves organization. Midway through the 2007 season, Andrus was traded to Texas. Andrus debuted in the major leagues in 2009 as the Rangers' Opening Day starting shortstop at the age of 20. After the season, he finished second in American League Rookie of the Year voting.

Andrus earned the first All-Star selection of his career in 2010, later receiving a second selection in 2012. Andrus defended the left side of the Rangers' infield next to third baseman Adrián Beltré for eight years, forming a friendship that was noted for the former's practical jokes on the latter. After 12 seasons with the Rangers, Andrus was traded to Oakland in February 2021.

Andrus was starting shortstop with the Athletics for one-and-a-half seasons before being released in 2022. He was then promptly signed by the White Sox, with whom he scored his 1,000th career run. In 2023, he recorded the 2,000th hit of his career and played in his 2,000th game.

== Early life ==
Andrus was born in Maracay, Venezuela, the son of Emilio and Elvia Andrus. Emilio Andrus was a university professor; he died when Elvis was seven years old. He has two older brothers, Erold and Erikson. Some Venezuelan families name their children after famous non-Venezuelan people, but Andrus said that he is not sure whether he was named after Elvis Presley. Andrus said, "I asked my mother a lot of times, but she never told me. Maybe my dad liked Elvis Presley. I'm not sure about that."

== Playing career ==
=== Minor leagues ===
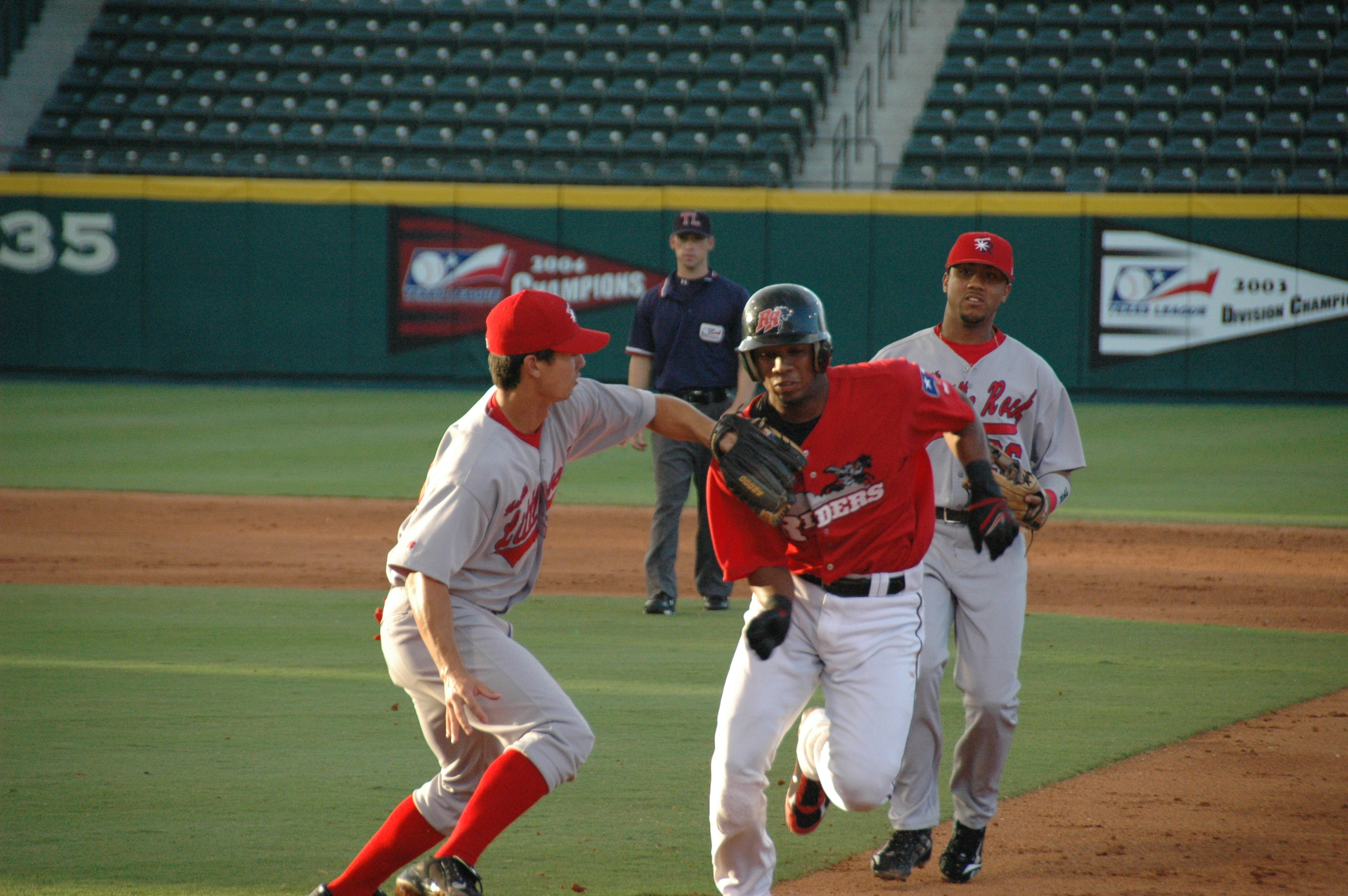
Andrus caught in a rundown in 2008

At the age of 16, Andrus signed with the Atlanta Braves and received a signing bonus of $600,000. He started the 2005 season with the Orlando Braves of the Gulf Coast League, and was promoted to Danville late in the season. He spent 2006 with Class-A Rome, being named to the South Atlantic League All-Star team.

In 2007, Andrus joined the Class A Myrtle Beach Pelicans of the Carolina League. Andrus was selected to the All-Star Futures Game in 2007 and 2008.

On July 31, 2007, Andrus, Jarrod Saltalamacchia, and three minor league pitchers (Matt Harrison, Neftalí Feliz, and Beau Jones) were traded from the Braves to the Rangers for Mark Teixeira and Ron Mahay.

=== Texas Rangers (2009–2020) ===
==== 2009 ====
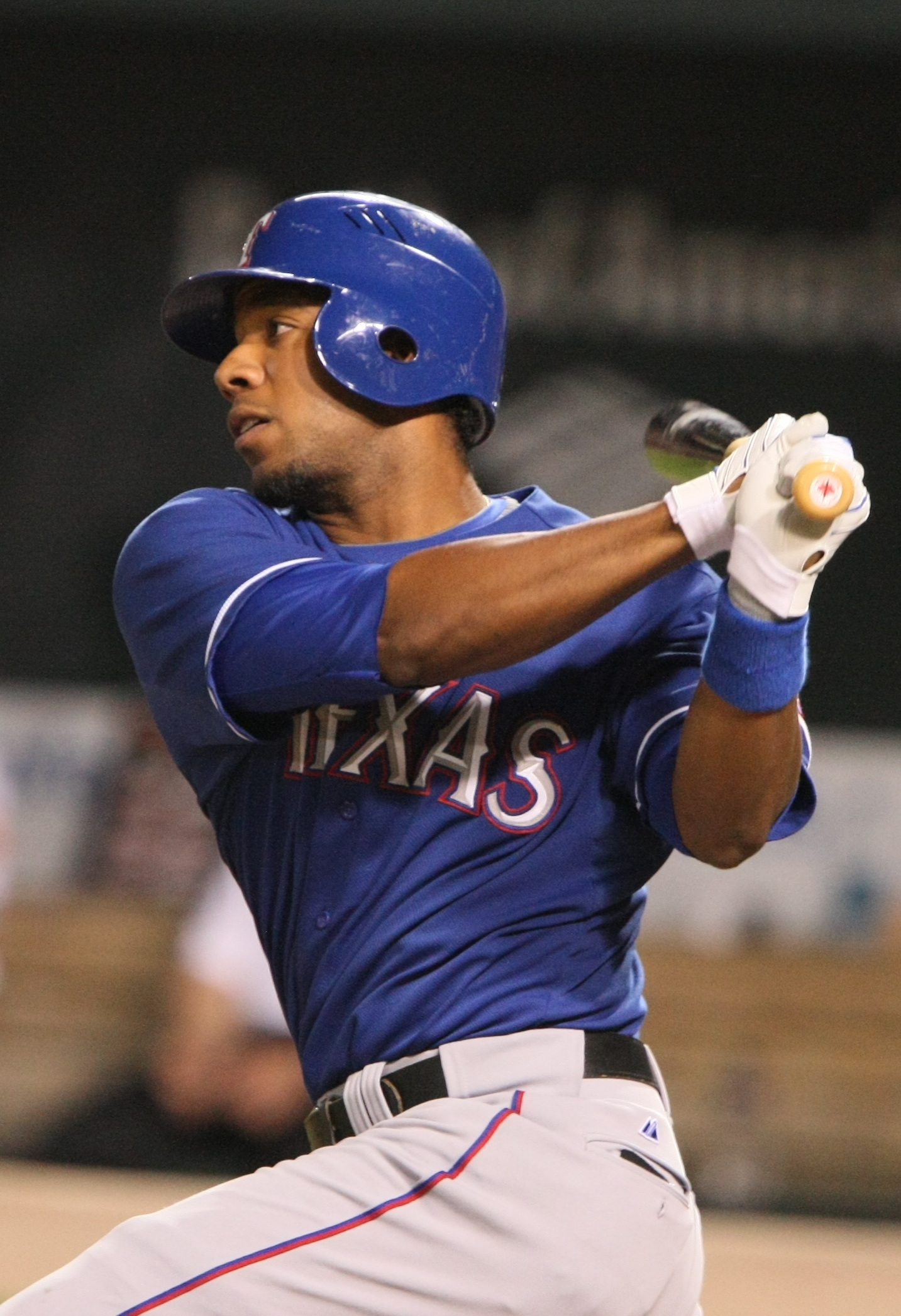
Andrus with the Rangers in 2009

With Rangers shortstop Michael Young agreeing to move to third base in 2009, Andrus earned the starting job on Opening Day. He was the second-youngest player in the American League (AL) at the time, older than only pitcher Rick Porcello. As Andrus was only 20 years old, Texas signed shortstop Omar Vizquel, then 41 years old, for insurance, but Vizquel played only 27 games at shortstop. On May 20, Andrus and second baseman Ian Kinsler turned a triple play, with Kinsler catching a line drive and throwing to Andrus, who stepped on second base to put out a runner who failed to tag up and then tagged a runner who had left first base. Andrus stole his 20th base on July 28, 2009. Andrus was the tenth player in major league history to steal 20 bases under the age of 21. The last player to do so was his then-teammate Andruw Jones, who had accomplished the feat in 1997 with Atlanta. Andrus finished the 2009 season hitting .267 with 6 home runs and 33 stolen bases, finishing second in American League Rookie of the Year voting, behind reliever Andrew Bailey.

==== 2010 ====
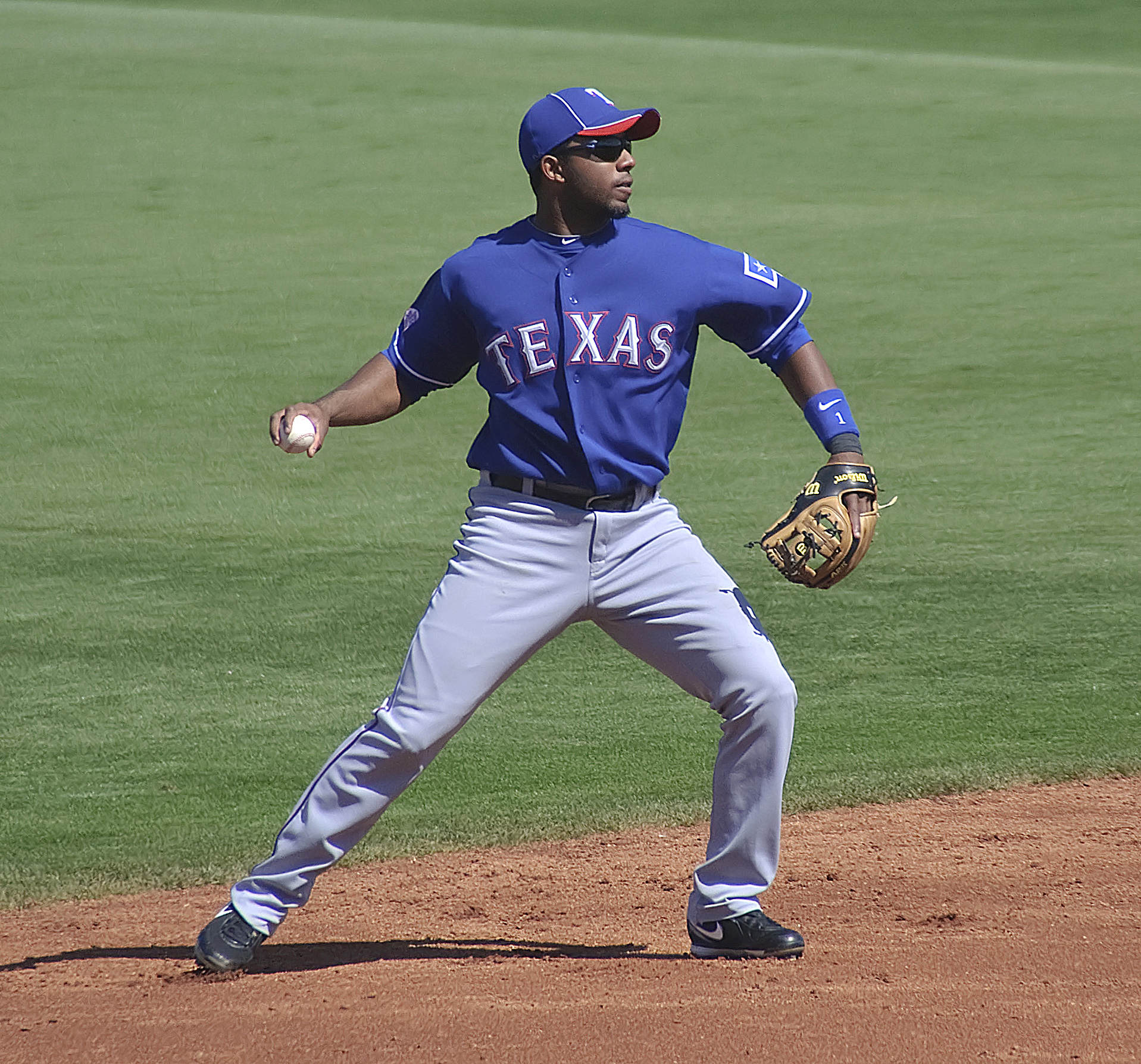
Andrus in 2010

Andrus was named to the 2010 American League All-Star team. That year, he batted .265 with no home runs. He led the AL in sacrifice hits (17), was 2nd in caught stealing (15), and 9th in stolen bases (32). In the postseason, Andrus hit well in the Rangers' first two series, batting .333 with seven steals in 11 games. In the World Series, his performance plummeted, batting .176 with zero extra base hits as the Rangers lost to the San Francisco Giants.

==== 2011 ====
In 2011, Andrus batted .279, with 5 home runs. He was 3rd in the AL in sacrifice hits (16), 4th in caught stealing (12), and 5th in stolen bases (37). Defensively, he led all AL shortstops in errors with 25 and was second among league shortstops with 245 putouts and third with 407 assists. In the 2011 postseason, he hit .235 with one double and one base on balls as the Rangers again won the American League pennant but lost the World Series, this time to the St. Louis Cardinals.

==== 2012 ====
In 2012, Andrus earned his second All-Star selection, batting .286 while leading the AL in sacrifice hits with 17. In the 2012 American League Wild Card game, he hit two singles and grounded into a double play as the Rangers fell to the Baltimore Orioles.

==== 2013 ====
On April 1, 2013, Andrus signed an eight-year, $120 million extension with the Rangers. He finished the year again leading the AL in sacrifice hits (16) while batting .271 and scoring 91 runs. He had a career-high 42 stolen bases, which tied for third in the AL.

==== 2014 ====
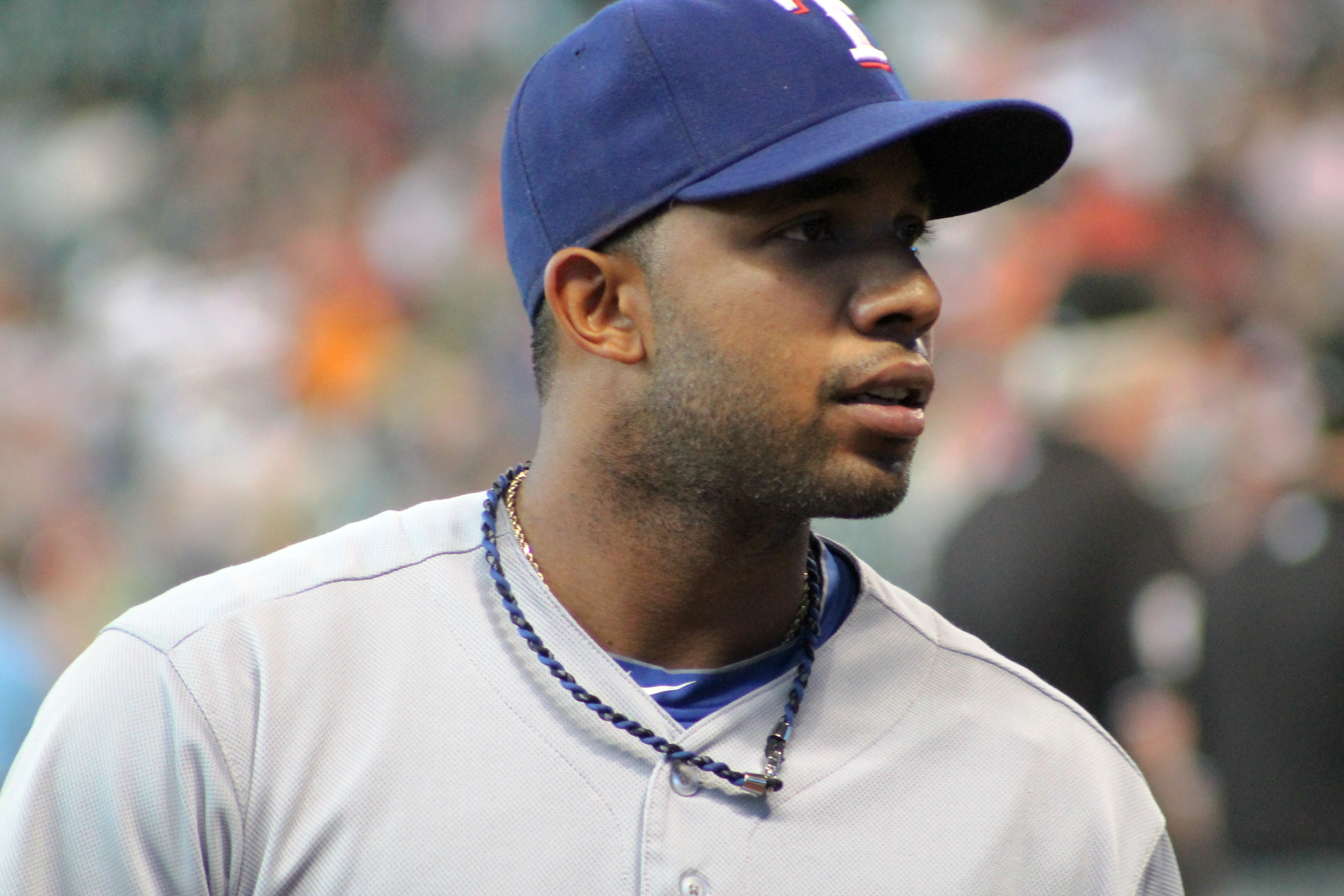
Andrus in 2014

Andrus began the 2014 season with an 11-game hitting streak that ultimately ended when he was ejected on April 13. On June 8, Andrus had a 39-game hitting streak against the Cleveland Indians snapped as he went 0 for 4. That game marked the first time in his career where he did not get a hit against Cleveland. Only Vladimir Guerrero had a longer streak against one team (with 44, against Texas). Andrus became the Rangers' all-time stolen base leader in 2014, surpassing former teammate Kinsler's 172 steals. However, he led the AL in caught stealing in 2014, with 15 for the season, while batting .263.

==== 2015 ====
Andrus finished 2015 with career lows in batting average (.258), on-base percentage (.309), and sacrifice hits, while posting a then-career-best seven home runs and stealing 25 bases for the AL West champion Rangers. Defensively, he led the major leagues in assists with 516. He batted .182 in the Division Series against the Toronto Blue Jays and made two of the team's three errors in the pivotal seventh inning of Game 5, won by the Blue Jays.

==== 2016 ====
In 2016, his offense bounced back, with a .302 batting average, eight home runs, and 69 RBIs.

==== 2017 ====
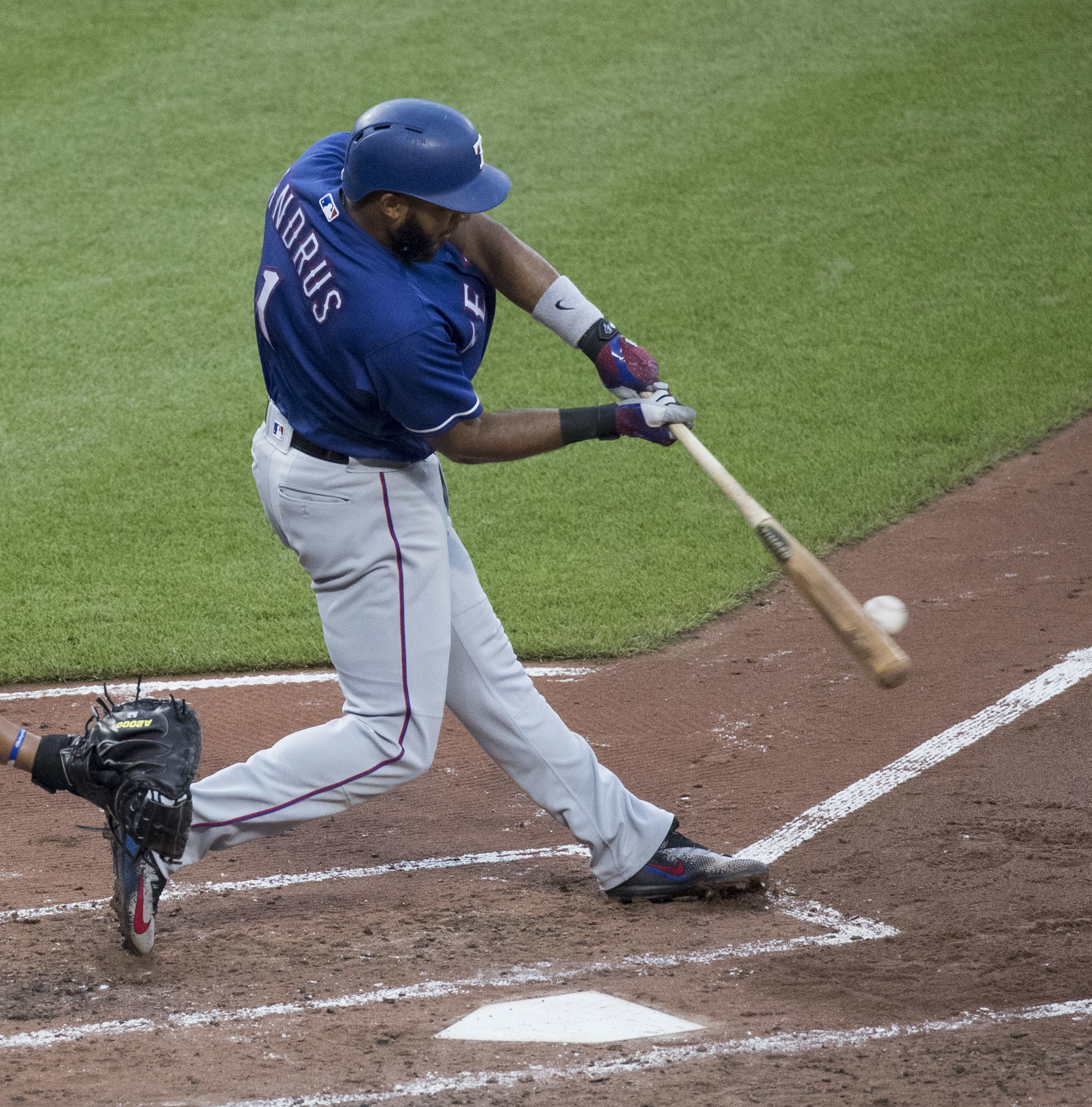
Andrus hitting in 2017

In 2017, he posted a career-best offensive season, hitting .297 with 20 home runs and 88 RBIs and 25 steals in 158 games. He led the major leagues in fielding assists with 490.

==== 2018 ====
On April 11, 2018, Angels reliever Keynan Middleton hit Andrus with a pitch on his right arm. X-rays and CT scans showed that Andrus had a fractured right elbow. He was placed on the injured list for the first time of his MLB career. He did not need surgery but had to stop baseball activities for several weeks. He was activated on June 18 from the injured list. Andrus finished 2018 hitting .256/.308/.367 with 6 home runs and 33 RBI.

==== 2019 ====
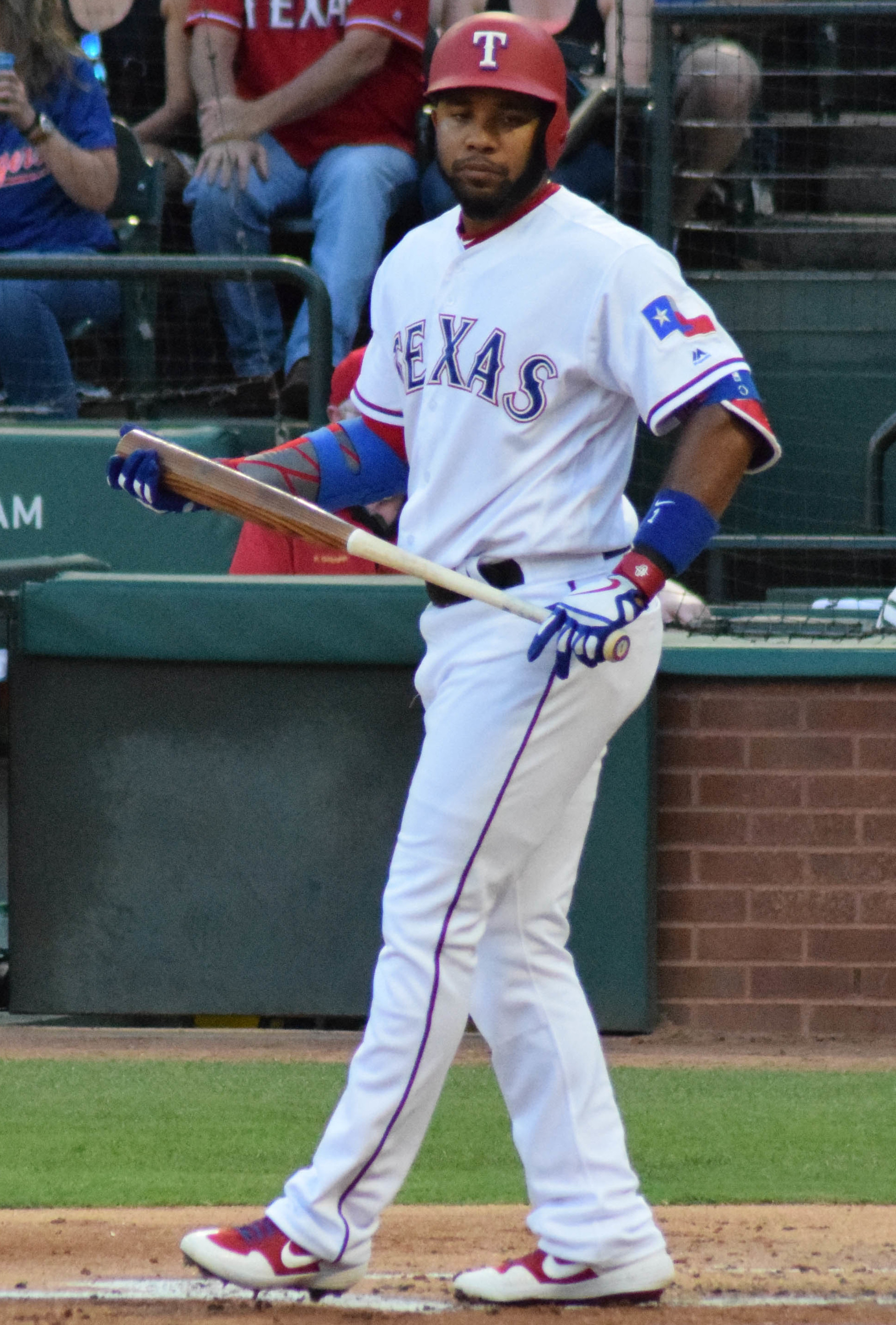
Andrus in June 2019

In 2019, Andrus hit .275/.313/.393 with 12 home runs, 72 RBIs, and 31 stolen bases. He tied for the AL lead with 10 sacrifice flies.

==== 2020 ====
In 2020, Andrus batted .194/.252/.330 with three home runs and seven RBIs in 103 at bats. His .969 fielding percentage was his lowest since 2011.

Andrus ended his tenure with the Rangers as the franchise's career leader with 305 stolen bases and 105 caught steals. He is second in games played, at-bats, singles, and triples, trailing former teammate Michael Young in all four categories.

=== Oakland Athletics (2021–2022) ===
On February 6, 2021, Andrus and Aramis Garcia were traded to the Oakland Athletics for Khris Davis, Jonah Heim, and Dane Acker. In his first year in Oakland, Andrus batted .243/.294/.320 with 3 home runs, 37 RBIs, and 12 stolen bases in 146 games. On August 17, 2022, Andrus was released by the Athletics. Finances contributed to the Athletics decision, as Andrus was 164 plate appearances from earning a $15-million player option for the following season.

=== Chicago White Sox (2022–2023) ===
The Chicago White Sox signed Andrus to a major league contract on August 19, 2022. He hit better in his 43 games in Chicago than he earlier in the season in Oakland, posting a .773 on-base plus slugging percentage with the White Sox, 100 points higher than he had with the Athletics.

On February 20, 2023, Andrus re-signed a with the White Sox for one year. On April 5, Andrus recorded his 2,000 career hit, a single off Logan Webb of the Giants that snapped an 0-for-14 hitless streak. For the only time in his career, he played the majority of his games at second base rather than shortstop. In the final game of his MLB career, he went hitless in five at-bats and scored Chicago's only run in a 2–1 loss to the San Diego Padres. He became a free agent following the 2023 season.

=== Arizona Diamondbacks and retirement ===
On March 3, 2024, Andrus signed a minor league contract with the Arizona Diamondbacks with an invitation to spring training. On March 22, Andrus was released by Arizona after failing to make the Opening Day roster.

Andrus' formal retirement from MLB was announced on September 4, 2024. On September 6, he signed a one-day contract with the Texas Rangers and officially retired with the team.

== Coaching career ==
Andrus was a coach for the American League in the 2024 All-Star Futures Game.

== Personal life ==
Andrus is a Christian. In 2012, Andrus donated $12,500 to OurCalling, a Christian charity that helps homeless people in Dallas County.

Andrus' older brother Erold Andrus played as an outfielder in affiliated Minor League Baseball from 2002 to 2008, then in independent leagues in 2009 and 2010. During spring training in 2011, though Erold was in minor league camp, he played in a Rangers spring training game, which was the first time that Erold and Elvis played in a game together in the United States.

Andrus' brothers were in Venezuela during protests in early 2014, which led him to talk with them every day to confirm their safety. "As a human being, you always get angry when you see what's happening with the military back home doing stuff to the civils, and to the students, and that's what really gets me angry... I'm not a political guy, but I just hate when you see somebody just walking and trying to say something get hit by police, or get hit by any military from the country that's supposed to defend the country instead of shoot him or hit him," he said.

Andrus married Cori Febles in a ceremony at their home on June 1, 2017. Their first child, a son named Elvis Emilio, was born on July 6, 2017. They held a larger wedding reception in the Dominican Republic in November 2017. On November 28, 2018, their second child, a girl named Lucia Alessandra, was born. In 2019, Andrus adopted "Baby Shark" as his walk-up song because it reminded him of his children.

On July 26, 2019, Andrus became a naturalized U.S. citizen.

In 2023, Andrus invested in Baseball United, a planned baseball league in the Middle East and South Asia.

== See also ==
- List of Major League Baseball career putouts as a shortstop leaders
- List of Major League Baseball players from Venezuela
