= Jonah Heim =

American baseball player (born 1995)

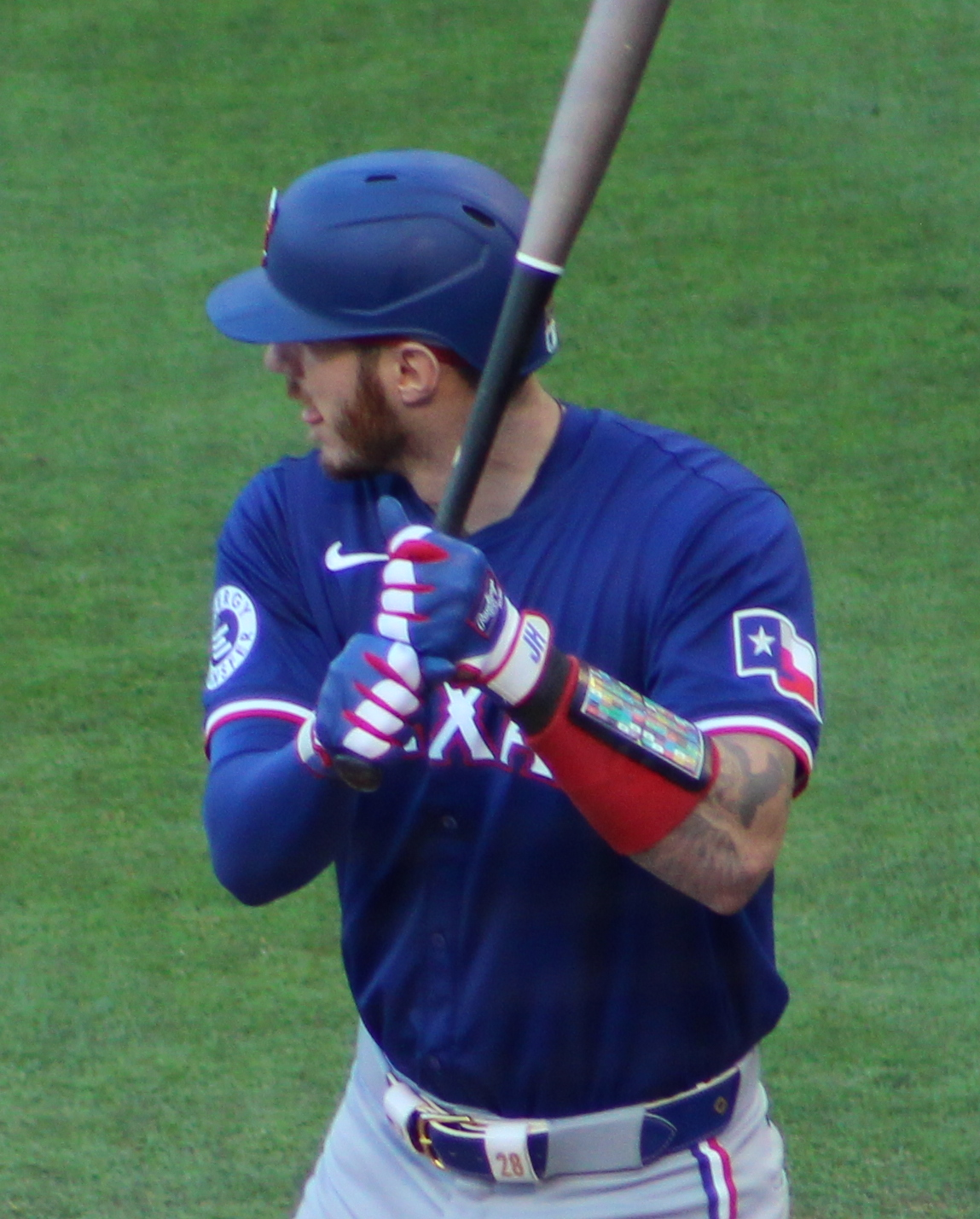
- Heim with the Texas Rangers in 2024

Free agent
- Catcher
- Born: June 27, 1995 (age 31); Buffalo, New York, U.S.
- Bats: Switch Throws: Right

MLB debut
- August 25, 2020, for the Oakland Athletics

MLB statistics (through September 20, 2026)
- Batting average: .222
- Home runs: 81
- Runs batted in: 324
- Stats at Baseball Reference

Teams
- Oakland Athletics (2020); Texas Rangers (2021–2025); Atlanta Braves (2026); Athletics (2026)

Career highlights and awards
- All-Star (2023); World Series champion (2023); Gold Glove Award (2023)

Jonah Nathan Heim (born June 27, 1995) is an American professional baseball catcher who is a free agent. He has played in Major League Baseball (MLB) for the Oakland Athletics, Texas Rangers and Atlanta Braves.

Born in Buffalo, New York, Heim attended Amherst Central High School, where the cold weather limited how often he played outdoors. The Baltimore Orioles selected him in the fourth round of the 2013 MLB draft, and he took several years to develop his offensive abilities in the Orioles' farm system. Heim was traded twice in the minor leagues, first to the Tampa Bay Rays and then to Oakland, where he made his MLB debut in 2020. The following year, the Athletics traded Heim to Texas, where he became the Rangers' starting catcher, represented the team at the 2023 MLB All-Star Game, and was a member of the 2023 World Series champions.

== Early life ==
Jonah Nathan Heim was born June 27, 1995, in Buffalo, New York. A childhood fan of the New York Yankees of Major League Baseball (MLB), Heim's favorite players were catchers like Jorge Posada and Russell Martin, and he grew up watching the Buffalo Bisons, the Toronto Blue Jays' Triple-A affiliate, although they were part of the Cleveland Guardians organization at the time, play at Sahlen Field. Heim began playing baseball when he was two years old, and around the age of 12, he took up switch hitting, telling his father, "hitting from the right side is boring".

Heim attended Kenmore East High School for one year before his parents moved out of the school district, requiring him to transfer to Amherst Central High School. The harsh climate in Buffalo meant that Heim could only play 20 outdoor baseball games in a season, and the team's stadium lacked an outfield wall, so home runs landed in nearby backyards or soccer fields. After batting .470 and picking off 12 baserunners during his junior year of high school, Heim was invited to play in several national exhibition games, where he caught the attention of professional scouts and college recruiters. Amherst retired Heim's No. 6 jersey shortly after his 2013 graduation.

== Career ==
=== Baltimore Orioles ===
The Baltimore Orioles selected Heim out of high school in the fourth round, 129th overall, of the 2013 MLB draft. At the time, Heim had committed to playing college baseball with the Michigan State Spartans, but he turned down the commitment and joined the Orioles on a $389,700 signing bonus. After signing, Heim was assigned to the Rookie-level GCL Orioles of the Gulf Coast League. He struggled in his rookie season, batting .185 with four runs batted in (RBI) in 27 games. Heim's poor hitting continued in the 2014 season, but Baltimore hitting coach Jeff Manto was unconcerned with the catcher's development, attributing it in part to his limited playing time in high school. Heim split the season between the GCL Orioles and the Aberdeen IronBirds of the Low–A New York–Penn League, batting .196 with one home run and seven RBI in 46 games.

Heim began the 2015 season with the Delmarva Shorebirds of the Single–A South Atlantic League, where he split time at catcher with Alex Murphy. He improved offensively to start the season, batting .258 with 10 extra-base hits and 16 RBI in 36 games before going on the injured list with a foot injury in May. He did not begin a rehab assignment until the end of August and returned to Delmarva on September 1. Heim finished the season batting .252 with one home run and 18 RBI in 45 minor league games. The Orioles promoted Heim to the Frederick Keys for the 2016 season, where he was named a Carolina League All-Star. Although he had a lifetime .216 batting average in 88 games for the Orioles organization, Heim cited his time in Frederick as a turning point for his offensive development.

=== Tampa Bay Rays ===
On August 1, 2016, the Orioles traded Heim to the Tampa Bay Rays in exchange for veteran utility player Steve Pearce. From there, he was assigned to the High–A Charlotte Stone Crabs, where he recorded the game-winning RBI in his Florida State League debut. Between Frederick and Charlotte, Heim batted .217 in 2016, with eight home runs and 33 RBI in 102 games. Heim opened the 2017 season with the Low–A Bowling Green Hot Rods, where he batted .268 with nine home runs and 53 RBI in 77 games before being promoted back to the Stone Crabs in August. There, he added an additional eight RBI on the season while batting .218 in 16 games.

=== Oakland Athletics ===
Heim was traded to the Oakland Athletics on December 19, 2017, as the player to be named later to complete a trade for Joey Wendle. He spent 2018 with both the High–A Stockton Ports and the Double–A Midland RockHounds, batting .258 with eight home runs and sixty RBIs in 119 total games between both teams. He split the 2019 season between Midland and the Triple–A Las Vegas Aviators, hitting a combined .310/.385/.477/.862 with nine home runs and 53 RBIs. On November 1, 2019, Heim was added to the Athletics' 40-man roster.

On June 30, 2020, Minor League Baseball canceled the 2020 season due to the effects of the COVID-19 pandemic. As a result, Heim was one of several Athletics prospects who began the pandemic-shortened season at an alternate training site as a member of the Oakland taxi squad. While not participating in games, he spent the first part of the season working with MLB pitchers during bullpen sessions and batting practice. On August 24, the Athletics optioned backup catcher Austin Allen and promoted Heim to the active roster in his place. Heim made his major league debut the next day, starting behind the plate in Oakland's 10–3 win over the Texas Rangers. In the seventh inning, Heim recorded his first MLB hit with a single off of Texas pitcher Kyle Gibson. Heim spent the remainder of the season as a backup for Sean Murphy. He appeared in 13 regular season games, all but one of which he started at catcher. In that time, he batted .211 with no extra-base hits and five RBI. Heim was named to the Athletics' postseason roster, but he did not appear in any playoff games for Oakland. After defeating the Chicago White Sox in the 2020 American League Wild Card Series, Oakland was eliminated by the Houston Astros in the 2020 American League Division Series (ALDS). After the MLB season, Heim planned to rejoin the Toros del Este for the 2020–21 Dominican Winter League season, but he recanted due to concerns surrounding the COVID-19 pandemic.

=== Texas Rangers ===
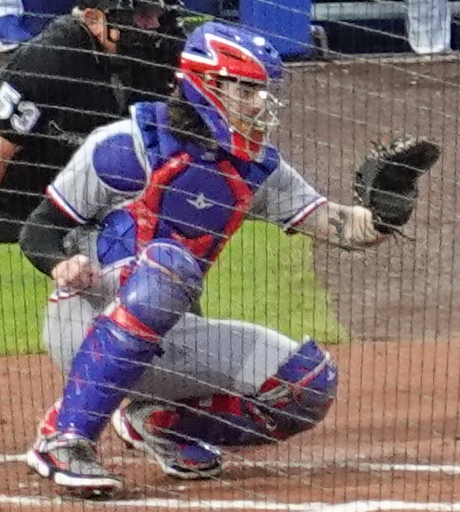
Heim in 2021

On February 6, 2021, Heim, Khris Davis, and Dane Acker were traded to the Texas Rangers in exchange for Elvis Andrus and Aramis Garcia. Heim hit his first major league home run on April 6, off Toronto Blue Jays pitcher Tommy Milone. On July 31, Heim hit home runs from each side of the plate, including his first career walk-off home run, off Seattle Mariners pitcher Diego Castillo. On August 1, he hit another walk-off home run versus Seattle to become the first player in Texas Rangers history, and the first rookie in MLB history, to record walk-off home runs in two straight games. Uniquely, in July 2021, the Rangers played the Toronto Blue Jays in Heim's hometown of Buffalo, New York due to the Blue Jays' temporary relocation to Sahlen Field as a result of not being able to play at the Rogers Centre during the pandemic, resulting in Heim getting the opportunity to play a major-league series in front of a hometown crowd. Heim went 2-for-7 in the two games he played, while the Rangers were swept by the Blue Jays. Over 82 games in 2021, Heim hit .196/.239/.358/.598 with 10 home runs and 32 RBI.

Heim hit his first major league grand slam on April 14, 2022, against Los Angeles Angels pitcher Shohei Ohtani in a 10–5 Rangers win; it was the first and to date, only grand slam Ohtani has given up in his major league career. Heim appeared in 127 games for Texas during the regular season, in which he hit .227/.298/.399 with 16 home runs and 48 RBI.

Heim was voted in as the American League starting catcher for the 2023 Major League Baseball All-Star Game. He went on the injured list with a sprained tendon in his wrist on July 28. Over 131 games for Texas in 2023, Heim hit .258/.317/.438 with 18 home runs and 95 RBI. With the Rangers, he won the 2023 World Series. Heim won the American League Gold Glove Award for catcher in 2023, the first of his career.

Heim made another 131 appearances for the Rangers in 2024, slashing .220/.267/.336 with 13 home runs and 59 RBI. Heim made 124 appearances for the Rangers during the 2025 campaign, batting .213/.271/.332 with 11 home runs and 43 RBI. On November 21, 2025, he was non-tendered by Texas and became a free agent.

=== Atlanta Braves ===
On February 10, 2026, Heim signed a one-year, $1.5 million contract with the Atlanta Braves. He made 12 appearances for Atlanta, slashing .231/.311/.410 with a home run and eight RBI. On May 4, Heim was designated for assignment by the Braves.

=== Athletics (second stint) ===
On May 4, 2026, Heim was traded to the Athletics in exchange for cash considerations.

== Personal life ==
Heim now has three children with his wife Mackenzie. Their son Nash was born in January 2021, their daughter Luxx was born in April 2022, their son Champ was born in June 2024. He has a tattoo of the Buffalo skyline on his arm.
