= Aramis Garcia =

American baseball player (born 1993)

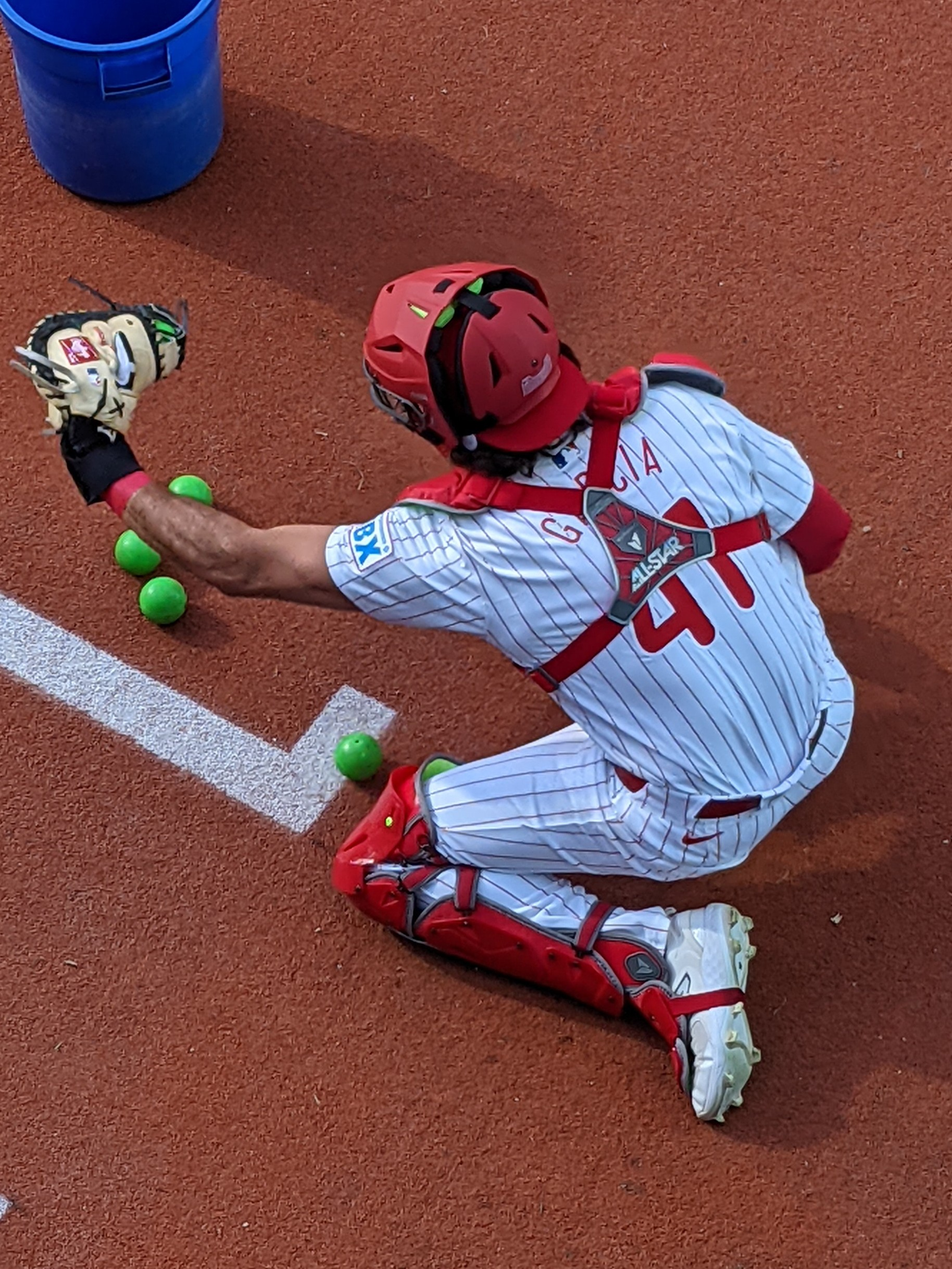
- Garcia with the Philadelphia Phillies in 2024

Arizona Diamondbacks
- Catcher
- Born: January 12, 1993 (age 33); Hialeah, Florida, U.S.
- Bats: Right Throws: Right

MLB debut
- August 31, 2018, for the San Francisco Giants

MLB statistics (through 2026 season)
- Batting average: .205
- Home runs: 11
- Runs batted in: 27
- Stats at Baseball Reference

Teams
- San Francisco Giants (2018–2019); Oakland Athletics (2021); Cincinnati Reds (2022); Philadelphia Phillies (2024); Arizona Diamondbacks (2025–2026)

Aramis Michael Garcia (born January 12, 1993) is an American professional baseball catcher in the Arizona Diamondbacks organization. He has previously played in Major League Baseball (MLB) for the San Francisco Giants, Oakland Athletics, Cincinnati Reds, and Philadelphia Phillies. The Giants selected Garcia in the second round of the 2014 MLB draft, and made his MLB debut with them in 2018.

== Early life ==
Garcia attended Pembroke Pines Charter High School in Pembroke Pines, Florida.

== College career ==
He enrolled at Florida International University (FIU) to play college baseball for the FIU Panthers. In 2012 and 2013, he played collegiate summer baseball with the Cotuit Kettleers of the Cape Cod Baseball League. In 2014, Garcia batted .368/.442/.626 and was named the Conference USA Baseball Player of the Year and a semifinalist for the Johnny Bench Award.

== Professional career ==
=== San Francisco Giants ===
==== Minor leagues (2014–2018) ====
The St. Louis Cardinals selected him in the 20th round of the 2011 Major League Baseball draft, but he did not sign a contract with them. The San Francisco Giants selected Garcia in the second round, with the 52nd overall selection, of the 2014 Major League Baseball draft. The Giants signed Garcia to a contract with a $1.1 million signing bonus. In his first professional season, he played for both the rookie-level Arizona League Giants and the Salem-Keizer Volcanoes, posting a combined .225 batting average with two home runs and 15 RBIs. He began the 2015 season with the Augusta GreenJackets of the Single–A South Atlantic League, where he was named a midseason All-Star. He received a midseason promotion to the San Jose Giants of the High–A California League and finished the year there; in 103 total games between the two teams, he batted .264/.342/.431 with 15 home runs and 66 RBIs.

Garcia received an invitation to spring training in 2016 as a non-roster player. He missed two months of the 2016 season due to multiple facial fractures he suffered during a May 22 game. When he returned, he played for San Jose where he batted .257/323/340 with two home runs and 20 RBIs in 41 games. At the end of the minor league regular season, Garcia joined the Scottsdale Scorpions of the Arizona Fall League.In 2017, he played for both San Jose and the Richmond Flying Squirrels of the Double–A Eastern League, posting a combined .274 batting average with 17 home runs and 73 RBIs along with an .808 OPS in 103 games between the two games. The Giants added him to their 40-man roster after the 2017 season.

In 2018, Garcia played 80 games for Richmond, and then was promoted to the Sacramento River Cats of the Triple–A Pacific Coast League.

==== Major leagues (2018–2019) ====
With Buster Posey undergoing season-ending surgery, the Giants promoted Garcia to the major leagues on August 26. He played his first game on August 31, and hit a home run in his debut.

He played in the 2019 season with Triple–A Sacramento, batting .271/.343/.488 with 16 home runs and 55 RBI in 332 at bats. He also played 18 games for the Giants, hitting .143/.217/.310 with 2 home runs and 5 RBI. Garcia did not play in a game in 2020 due to the cancellation of the minor league season because of the COVID-19 pandemic. On November 20, 2020, Garcia was designated for assignment.

=== Oakland Athletics (2021) ===
On November 25, 2020, the Texas Rangers claimed Garcia off of waivers. On February 6, 2021, the Rangers traded Garcia and Elvis Andrus to the Oakland Athletics in exchange for Khris Davis, Jonah Heim, and Dane Acker. Garcia hit .205/.239/.318 in 32 games for the Athletics before he was designated for assignment on September 20, 2021. Garcia was released by Oakland on September 22.

=== Cincinnati Reds (2022) ===
On November 29, 2021, Garcia signed a minor league contract with the Cincinnati Reds. On April 4, 2022, it was announced that he had made the 2022 opening day roster. On July 7, he was placed on the injured list with an elbow injury and a broken left middle finger, and was transferred to the 60-day injured list on August 11. Garcia was activated on October 4, with two games remaining in the season. He appeared in 47 games for Cincinnati, slashing .213/.248/.259 with one home run and 4 RBI.

On October 14, 2022, Garcia was claimed off waivers by the Baltimore Orioles. On October 30, Garcia was removed from the 40-man roster and sent outright to the Triple–A Norfolk Tides. On November 1, Garcia elected free agency in lieu of the outright assignment.

=== Philadelphia Phillies ===
On February 16, 2023, Garcia signed a minor league contract with the Philadelphia Phillies organization. In 56 games split between the High–A Jersey Shore BlueClaws and Triple–A Lehigh Valley IronPigs, he slashed .243/.284/.505 with 14 home runs and 46 RBI.

Garcia began the 2024 campaign with Lehigh Valley, playing in 74 games and batting .163/.219/.287 with eight home runs, 25 RBI, and six stolen bases. On September 7, 2024, the Phillies selected Garcia's contract, adding him to their active roster. In 3 games for the Phillies, he went 0–for–7 with 3 strikeouts. Garcia was designated for assignment by Philadelphia on September 15. He cleared waivers and was sent outright to Lehigh Valley on September 17. Garcia elected free agency on October 15.

=== Arizona Diamondbacks ===
On November 15, 2024, Garcia signed a minor league contract with the Arizona Diamondbacks. In 33 appearances for the Triple-A Reno Aces, he batted .275/.420/.587 with 10 home runs and 20 RBI. On June 7, 2025, the Diamondbacks selected Garcia's contract, adding him to their active roster. He appeared as a defensive substitution for the team that night, and was designated for assignment the following day. Garcia cleared waivers and was sent outright to Triple-A Reno on June 10. On June 19, the Diamondbacks added Garcia back to their active roster. After another lone appearance, the Diamondbacks designated Garcia for assignment a second time on June 23. He cleared waivers and was sent outright to Triple-A Reno on June 27.

On November 8, 2025, Garcia re-signed a with the Diamondbacks on a minor league contract that included an invitation to spring training. He was assigned to Triple-A Reno to begin the regular season, hitting .241 with three home runs and six RBI across nine appearances. On April 14, 2026, the Diamondbacks selected Garcia's contract, adding him to their active roster. He made three appearances for Arizona, going 1-for-3 (.333) with a single. On May 1, Garcia was designated for assignment following Gabriel Moreno's return from the injured list. He cleared waivers and was sent outright to Reno on May 5. On May 19, the Diamondbacks added Garcia back to their active roster following an injury to James McCann. He recorded two hits across five games before being designated for assignment again on June 12. Garcia cleared waivers and was sent outright to Reno on June 15. He elected free agency on October 5.

On October 12, 2026, Garcia re-signed with the Arizona Diamondbacks on a new minor league contract.
