= 2021 Texas Rangers season =

2021 Texas Rangers
- League: American League
- Division: West
- Ballpark: Globe Life Field
- City: Arlington
- Record: 60–102 (.370)
- Divisional place: 5th
- Owners: Ray Davis & Bob R. Simpson
- Managers: Chris Woodward
- Television: Bally Sports Southwest (Dave Raymond, C.J. Nitkowski, Tom Grieve)
- Radio: KRLD 105.3 FM (English) (Eric Nadel, Matt Hicks, Dave Raymond); KZMP 1540 AM (Spanish) (Eleno Orlenas, Jerry Romo)
- Stats: ESPN.com; Baseball Reference

The 2021 Texas Rangers season was the 61st of the Texas Rangers franchise overall, their 50th in Arlington as the Rangers, and the second season at Globe Life Field. The Rangers would finish with a 60–102 record which was the third worst record just behind the Baltimore Orioles and Arizona Diamondbacks, also a franchise worst since 1973 and their first season since then with 100 or more losses. Outfielder Joey Gallo and starting pitcher Kyle Gibson were also traded at the trade deadline to the New York Yankees and Philadelphia Phillies respectively.

== Offseason ==
=== Transactions ===
- December 2, 2020: Rangers non tender outfielders Danny Santana and Scott Heineman, and pitcher Jimmy Herget.
- December 3, 2020: Rangers sign pitcher Joe Gatto and re-sign outfielder Scott Heineman.
- December 8, 2020: Rangers trade pitcher Lance Lynn to the Chicago White Sox for pitchers Dane Dunning and Avery Weems.
- December 10, 2020: Rangers select pitcher Brett de Geus second overall in the Rule 5 draft.
- December 10, 2020: Rangers trade catcher Heriberto Hernandez, infielder Osleivis Basabe, and outfielder Alexander Ovalles to the Tampa Bay Rays for first basemen Nate Lowe and Jake Guenther, and a PTBNL.
- December 11, 2020: Rangers re-sign pitcher Jimmy Herget, outfielder Scott Heineman designated for assignment.
- December 11, 2020: Rangers sign outfielder David Dahl to a one-year deal.
- December 15, 2020: Rangers trade pitcher Rafael Montero to the Seattle Mariners for pitcher Jose Corniell and a PTBNL.
- December 16, 2020: Rangers trade outfielder Scott Heineman to the Cincinnati Reds for infielder Jose Acosta.
- December 25, 2020: Rangers sign pitcher Kohei Arihara through the posting system.
- December 26, 2020: Rangers pitcher Art Warren is designated for assignment.
- January 6, 2021: Rangers trade pitcher Art Warren to the Cincinnati Reds for cash considerations.
- February 6, 2021: Rangers trade shortstop Elvis Andrus, catcher Aramis Garcia, and cash considerations to the Oakland Athletics for designated hitter Khris Davis, catcher Jonah Heim, and minor league pitcher Dane Acker.
- February 10, 2021: Rangers sign Mike Foltynewicz to one year deal.

• October 2024- Rangers sign Jett Davis to 2-year $550k deal starting in 2025 but he has since been released due to needing Tommy John surgery

== Regular season ==
=== Season standings ===
==== American League West ====
AL West
Team	W	L	Pct.	GB	Home	Road
Houston Astros	95	67	.586	—	51‍–‍30	44‍–‍37
Seattle Mariners	90	72	.556	5	46‍–‍35	44‍–‍37
Oakland Athletics	86	76	.531	9	43‍–‍38	43‍–‍38
Los Angeles Angels	77	85	.475	18	40‍–‍42	37‍–‍43
Texas Rangers	60	102	.370	35	36‍–‍45	24‍–‍57

==== American League Wild Card ====
Division leaders
Team	W	L	Pct.
Tampa Bay Rays	100	62	.617
Houston Astros	95	67	.586
Chicago White Sox	93	69	.574

Wild Card teams (Top 2 teams qualify for postseason)
Team	W	L	Pct.	GB
Boston Red Sox	92	70	.568	—
New York Yankees	92	70	.568	—
Toronto Blue Jays	91	71	.562	1
Seattle Mariners	90	72	.556	2
Oakland Athletics	86	76	.531	6
Cleveland Indians	80	82	.494	12
Los Angeles Angels	77	85	.475	15
Detroit Tigers	77	85	.475	15
Kansas City Royals	74	88	.457	18
Minnesota Twins	73	89	.451	19
Texas Rangers	60	102	.370	32
Baltimore Orioles	52	110	.321	40

==== Record against opponents ====
2021 American League record Source: MLB Standings Grid – 2021
Team	BAL	BOS	CWS	CLE	DET	HOU	KC	LAA	MIN	NYY	OAK	SEA	TB	TEX	TOR	NL
Baltimore	—	6–13	0–7	2–5	2–5	3–3	4–3	2–4	2–4	8–11	3–3	3–4	1–18	4–3	5–14	7–13
Boston	13–6	—	3–4	4–2	3–3	2–5	5–2	3–3	5–2	10–9	3–3	4–3	8–11	3–4	10–9	16–4
Chicago	7–0	4–3	—	10–9	12–7	2–5	9–10	2–5	13–6	1–5	4–3	3–3	3–3	5–1	4–3	14–6
Cleveland	5–2	2–4	9–10	—	12–7	1–6	14–5	5–1	8–11	3–4	2–4	3–4	1–6	4–2	2–5	9–11
Detroit	5–2	3–3	7–12	7–12	—	5–2	8–11	1–6	8–11	3–3	1–6	5–1	4–3	6–1	3–3	11–9
Houston	3–3	5–2	5–2	6–1	2–5	—	3–4	13–6	3–4	2–4	11–8	11–8	4–2	14–5	4–2	9–11
Kansas City	3–4	2–5	10–9	5–14	11–8	4–3	—	2–4	10–9	2–4	2–5	4–3	2–4	2–4	3–4	12–8
Los Angeles	4–2	3–3	5–2	1–5	6–1	6–13	4–2	—	5–2	4–3	4–15	8–11	1–6	11–8	4–3	11–9
Minnesota	4–2	2–5	6–13	11–8	11–8	4–3	9–10	2–5	—	1–6	1–5	2–4	3–3	4–3	3–4	10–10
New York	11–8	9–10	5–1	4–3	3–3	4–2	4–2	3–4	6–1	—	4–3	5–2	8–11	6–1	8–11	12–8
Oakland	3–3	3–3	3–4	4–2	6–1	8–11	5–2	15–4	5–1	3–4	—	4–15	4–3	10–9	2–5	11–9
Seattle	4–3	3–4	3–3	4–3	1–5	8–11	3–4	11–8	4–2	2–5	15–4	—	6–1	13–6	4–2	9–11
Tampa Bay	18–1	11–8	3–3	6–1	3–4	2–4	4–2	6–1	3–3	11–8	3–4	1–6	—	3–4	11–8	15–5
Texas	3–4	4–3	1–5	2–4	1–6	5–14	4–2	8–11	3–4	1–6	9–10	6–13	4–3	—	2–4	7–13
Toronto	14–5	9–10	3–4	5–2	3–3	2–4	4–3	3–4	4–3	11–8	5–2	2–4	8–11	4–2	—	14–6

Updated with the results of all games through October 3, 2021.

=== Game log ===
Legend
Rangers Win	Rangers Loss	Game postponed

2021 Game Log: 60–102 (Home: 36–45; Away: 24–57)
April: 11–16 (Home: 5–9; Away: 6–7)

#	Date	Opponent	Score	Win	Loss	Save	Attendance	Record	Streak
1	April 1	@ Royals	10–14	Hernández (1–0)	Cody (0–1)	Davis (1)	9,155	0–1	L1
2	April 3	@ Royals	4–11	Minor (1–0)	Sborz (0–1)	—	8,889	0–2	L2
3	April 4	@ Royals	7–3	Lyles (1–0)	Singer (0–1)	—	8,869	1–2	W1
4	April 5	Blue Jays	2–6	Matz (1–0)	Foltynewicz (0–1)	—	38,258	1–3	L1
5	April 6	Blue Jays	7–4	Dunning (1–0)	Roark (0–1)	Kennedy (1)	18,585	2–3	W1
6	April 7	Blue Jays	2–1	Gibson (1–0)	Ryu (0–1)	Kennedy (2)	16,876	3–3	W2
7	April 9	Padres	0–3	Musgrove (2–0)	Arihara (0–1)	—	27,575	3–4	L1
8	April 10	Padres	4–7	Weathers (1–0)	Benjamin (0–1)	Melancon (4)	35,856	3–5	L2
9	April 11	Padres	0–2	Stammen (1–1)	Foltynewicz (0–2)	Melancon (5)	26,723	3–6	L3
10	April 12	@ Rays	0–1	Glasnow (1–0)	Hearn (0–1)	Castillo (3)	3,627	3–7	L4
11	April 13	@ Rays	8–3	Gibson (2–0)	Yarbrough (0–2)	—	4,753	4–7	W1
12	April 14	@ Rays	5–1	Arihara (1–1)	Fleming (0–1)	—	3,021	5–7	W2
13	April 15	@ Rays	6–4 (10)	Sborz (1–1)	Reed (0–1)	Kennedy (3)	4,217	6–7	W3
14	April 16	Orioles	2–5	López (1–2)	Foltynewicz (0–3)	Valdez (3)	22,173	6–8	L1
15	April 17	Orioles	1–6	Lakins (1–0)	Rodríguez (0–1)	—	29,338	6–9	L2
16	April 18	Orioles	1–0 (10)	King (1–0)	Lakins (1–1)	—	24,267	7–9	W1
17	April 19	@ Angels	6–4	Arihara (2–1)	Bundy (0–2)	Kennedy (4)	11,396	8–9	W2
18	April 20	@ Angels	2–6	Canning (1–1)	Lyles (1–1)	—	12,544	8–10	L1
19	April 21	@ Angels	7–4	King (2–0)	Mayers (1–1)	—	9,207	9–10	W1
20	April 23	@ White Sox	7–9	Heuer (2–1)	Cody (0–2)	Hendriks (4)	8,969	9–11	L1
21	April 24	@ White Sox	1–2	Hendriks (1–0)	King (2–1)	—	8,556	9–12	L2
22	April 25	@ White Sox	4–8	Kopech (2–0)	Arihara (2–2)	—	9,285	9–13	L3
23	April 26	Angels	4–9	Ohtani (1–0)	Lyles (1–2)	—	17,766	9–14	L4
24	April 27	Angels	6–1	Foltynewicz (1–3)	Quintana (0–2)	—	16,103	10–14	W1
25	April 28	Angels	3–4	Rodriguez (2–0)	Dunning (1–1)	Iglesias (4)	17,875	10–15	L1
26	April 29	Red Sox	4–1	Gibson (3–0)	Pérez (0–2)	Kennedy (5)	23,640	11–15	W1
27	April 30	Red Sox	1–6	Eovaldi (4–2)	Arihara (2–3)	—	28,267	11–16	L1

May: 11–17 (Home: 8–4; Away: 3–13)

#	Date	Opponent	Score	Win	Loss	Save	Attendance	Record	Streak
28	May 1	Red Sox	8–6	Sborz (2–1)	Andriese (0–1)	Kennedy (6)	35,129	12–16	W1
29	May 2	Red Sox	5–3	Sborz (3–1)	Ottavino (2–2)	Kennedy (7)	29,190	13–16	W2
30	May 3	@ Twins	5–6	Maeda (2–2)	Dunning (1–2)	Rogers (2)	8,071	13–17	L1
31	May 4	@ Twins	6–3 (10)	Rodríguez (1–1)	Waddell (0–1)	Kennedy (8)	8,022	14–17	W1
32	May 5	@ Twins	3–1	King (3–1)	Thorpe (0–1)	Kennedy (9)	7,853	15–17	W2
33	May 6	@ Twins	4–3 (10)	Hearn (1–1)	Duffey (0–1)	Sborz (1)	8,760	16–17	W3
34	May 7	Mariners	4–5	Flexen (3–1)	Sborz (3–2)	Graveman (4)	26,047	16–18	L1
35	May 8	Mariners	9–8	King (4–1)	Misiewicz (2–2)	Kennedy (10)	26,616	17–18	W1
36	May 9	Mariners	10–2	Dunning (2–2)	Sheffield (2–3)	—	30,632	18–18	W2
37	May 10	@ Giants	1–3	Wood (4–0)	King (4–2)	McGee (9)	7,450	18–19	L1
38	May 11	@ Giants	2–4	Webb (2–3)	Lyles (1–3)	McGee (10)	7,268	18–20	L2
39	May 13	@ Astros	3–4 (11)	Raley (1–2)	Martin (0–1)	—	16,340	18–21	L3
40	May 14	@ Astros	4–10	Greinke (3–1)	Benjamin (0–2)	—	24,495	18–22	L4
41	May 15	@ Astros	5–6	García (1–3)	Dunning (2–3)	Pressly (7)	25,858	18–23	L5
42	May 16	@ Astros	2–6	Raley (2–2)	Rodríguez (1–2)	—	26,069	18–24	L6
43	May 17	Yankees	5–2	Lyles (2–3)	Cole (5–2)	Kennedy (11)	28,040	19–24	W1
44	May 18	Yankees	4–7	Peralta (3–1)	Foltynewicz (1–4)	Chapman (10)	26,522	19–25	L1
45	May 19	Yankees	0–2	Kluber (4–2)	Yang (0–1)	—	31,689	19–26	L2
46	May 20	Yankees	0–2	Germán (4–2)	King (4–3)	Chapman (11)	27,581	19–27	L3
47	May 21	Astros	7–5 (10)	Hearn (2–1)	Abreu (2–3)	—	30,445	20–27	W1
48	May 22	Astros	8–4	Allard (1–0)	Scrubb (1–1)	—	38,055	21–27	W2
49	May 23	Astros	3–2 (10)	King (5–3)	Pressly (2–1)	—	36,444	22–27	W3
50	May 25	@ Angels	5–11	Heaney (2–3)	Yang (0–2)	—	10,987	22–28	L1
51	May 26	@ Angels	8–9	Canning (4–3)	Dunning (2–4)	Iglesias (8)	8,547	22–29	L2
52	May 27	@ Mariners	0–5	Flexen (5–2)	Allard (1–1)	—	9,008	22–30	L3
53	May 28	@ Mariners	2–3	Sheffield (4–4)	Lyles (2–4)	Swanson (1)	10,605	22–31	L4
54	May 29	@ Mariners	2–3	Zamora (1–0)	Foltynewicz (1–5)	Montero (7)	11,071	22–32	L5
55	May 30	@ Mariners	2–4	Kikuchi (3–3)	Yang (0–3)	Middleton (4)	11,198	22–33	L6

June: 9–16 (Home: 7–8; Away: 2–8)

#	Date	Opponent	Score	Win	Loss	Save	Attendance	Record	Streak
56	June 1	@ Rockies	2–3 (11)	Givens (2–2)	Martin (0–2)	—	18,028	22–34	L7
57	June 2	@ Rockies	3–6	Senzatela (2–5)	Evans (0–1)	Bard (6)	19,289	22–35	L8
58	June 3	@ Rockies	6–11	Gomber (4–5)	Foltynewicz (1–6)	—	19,150	22–36	L9
59	June 4	Rays	5–4	Gibson (4–0)	Fleming (5–4)	Kennedy (12)	30,635	23–36	W1
60	June 5	Rays	0–3	Hill (5–2)	Allard (1–2)	Castillo (9)	27,237	23–37	L1
61	June 6	Rays	1–7	Feyereisen (2–2)	King (5–4)	—	26,442	23–38	L2
62	June 8	Giants	4–9	Álvarez (2–1)	Rodríguez (1–3)	—	24,938	23–39	L3
63	June 9	Giants	4–3 (11)	Martin (1–2)	McGee (1–2)	—	25,803	24–39	W1
64	June 11	@ Dodgers	1–12	Kershaw (8–5)	Foltynewicz (1–7)	—	20,220	24–40	L1
65	June 12	@ Dodgers	12–1	Allard (2–2)	Bauer (6–5)	—	17,500	25–40	W1
66	June 13	@ Dodgers	3–5	Buehler (6–0)	Dunning (2–5)	Jansen (15)	15,508	25–41	L1
67	June 15	@ Astros	3–6 (10)	Pressly (3–1)	Evans (0–2)	—	26,379	25–42	L2
68	June 16	@ Astros	4–8	Greinke (7–2)	Lyles (2–5)	—	22,735	25–43	L3
69	June 18	Twins	5–7 (10)	Robles (3–3)	Sborz (3–3)	Duffey (2)	30,304	25–44	L4
70	June 19	Twins	2–3	Thielbar (2–0)	King (5–5)	Rogers (7)	34,044	25–45	L5
71	June 20	Twins	2–4	Maeda (3–2)	Dunning (2–6)	Robles (6)	34,007	25–46	L6
72	June 21	Athletics	8–3	Gibson (5–0)	Montas (7–7)	—	20,259	26–46	W1
73	June 22	Athletics	6–13	Irvin (5–7)	Hearn (2–2)	—	19,185	26–47	L1
74	June 23	Athletics	5–3	Martin (2–2)	Petit (7–1)	Rodríguez (1)	21,829	27–47	W1
75	June 24	Athletics	1–5	Bassitt (8–2)	Allard (2–3)	—	20,432	27–48	L1
76	June 25	Royals	9–4	Dunning (3–6)	Minor (6–5)	—	30,389	28–48	W1
77	June 26	Royals	8–0	Gibson (6–0)	Bubic (2–3)	—	31,612	29–48	W2
78	June 27	Royals	4–1	Lyles (3–5)	Singer (3–6)	Kennedy (13)	29,046	30–48	W3
79	June 29	@ Athletics	5–4	Foltynewicz (2–7)	Kaprielian (4–2)	Kennedy (14)	4,739	31–48	W4
80	June 30	@ Athletics	1–3	Bassitt (9–2)	Allard (2–4)	Trivino (13)	4,320	31–49	L1

July: 6–18 (Home: 4–6; Away: 2–12)

#	Date	Opponent	Score	Win	Loss	Save	Attendance	Record	Streak
81	July 1	@ Athletics	8–3	King (6–5)	Manaea (6–5)	—	5,182	32–49	W1
82	July 2	@ Mariners	4–5 (10)	Misiewicz (3–3)	Hearn (2–3)	—	28,638	32–50	L1
83	July 3	@ Mariners	7–3	Lyles (4–5)	Gonzales (1–5)	—	16,046	33–50	W1
84	July 4	@ Mariners	1–4	Flexen (7–3)	Foltynewicz (2–8)	Graveman (8)	15,146	33–51	L1
85	July 5	Tigers	3–7	Peralta (2–1)	Allard (2–5)	—	34,484	33–52	L2
86	July 6	Tigers	10–5	King (7–5)	Norris (0–3)	—	24,367	34–52	W1
87	July 7	Tigers	3–5	Funkhouser (3–0)	Gibson (6–1)	Soto (7)	33,043	34–53	L1
88	July 9	Athletics	3–2	Lyles (5–5)	Irvin (6–8)	Kennedy (15)	29,619	35–53	W1
89	July 10	Athletics	4–8 (11)	Wendelken (2–1)	Patton (0–1)	—	30,030	35–54	L1
90	July 11	Athletics	1–4	Bassitt (10–2)	Allard (2–6)	Trivino (14)	30,531	35–55	L2
91	July 16	@ Blue Jays	2–10	Ray (8–4)	Lyles (5–6)	—	10,100	35–56	L3
–	July 17	@ Blue Jays	Postponed (Rain; Makeup: July 18)						
92	July 18 (1)	@ Blue Jays	0–5 (7)	Ryu (9–5)	Allard (2–7)	—	N/A	35–57	L4
93	July 18 (2)	@ Blue Jays	0–10 (7)	Matz (8–4)	Foltynewicz (2–9)	—	12,335	35–58	L5
94	July 19	@ Tigers	0–14	Jiménez (4–1)	Gibson (6–2)	—	13,704	35–59	L6
95	July 20	@ Tigers	1–4	Skubal (6–8)	Dunning (3–7)	Soto (9)	13,333	35–60	L7
96	July 21	@ Tigers	2–4	Manning (2–3)	Lyles (5–7)	Soto (10)	21,132	35–61	L8
97	July 22	@ Tigers	5–7	Funkhouser (4–0)	Foltynewicz (2–10)	Soto (11)	16,033	35–62	L9
98	July 23	@ Astros	3–7	Bielak (3–3)	Allard (2–8)	—	38,853	35–63	L10
99	July 24	@ Astros	1–4	Valdez (6–2)	Gibson (6–3)	—	37,050	35–64	L11
100	July 25	@ Astros	1–3	Greinke (10–3)	Santana (0–1)	Pressly (18)	35,627	35–65	L12
101	July 27	Diamondbacks	5–4	Dunning (4–7)	Widener (1–1)	Kennedy (16)	27,336	36–65	W1
102	July 28	Diamondbacks	2–3	Bumgarner (5–6)	Martin (2–3)	Clippard (1)	26,607	36–66	L1
103	July 30	Mariners	5–9	Gilbert (5–2)	Allard (2–9)	—	27,542	36–67	L2
104	July 31	Mariners	5–4 (10)	Patton (1–1)	Castillo (2–5)	—	33,463	37–67	W1

August: 10–18 (Home: 7–9; Away: 3–9)

#	Date	Opponent	Score	Win	Loss	Save	Attendance	Record	Streak
105	August 1	Mariners	4–3	Santana (1–1)	Swanson (0–1)	—	23,664	38–67	W2
106	August 2	Angels	4–1	Dunning (5–7)	Rodriguez (2–1)	Patton (1)	20,533	39–67	W3
107	August 3	Angels	3–11	Suárez (5–4)	Lyles (5–8)	—	19,074	39–68	L1
108	August 4	Angels	1–2	Ohtani (6–1)	Allard (2–10)	Iglesias (23)	27,360	39–69	L2
109	August 5	Angels	0–5	Bundy (2–8)	Howard (0–3)	—	21,670	39–70	L3
110	August 6	@ Athletics	1–4 (11)	Petit (8–1)	Herget (0–1)	—	9,022	39–71	L4
111	August 7	@ Athletics	3–12	Irvin (8–10)	Anderson (0–1)	—	10,082	39–72	L5
112	August 8	@ Athletics	3–6	Kaprielian (6–4)	Lyles (5–9)	Trivino (18)	9,548	39–73	L6
113	August 10	@ Mariners	5–4 (10)	Martin (3–3)	Swanson (0–2)	—	15,412	40–73	W1
114	August 11	@ Mariners	1–2	Steckenrider (4–2)	Santana (1–2)	—	15,789	40–74	L1
115	August 12	@ Mariners	1–3	Gonzales (4–5)	Foltynewicz (2–11)	—	14,031	40–75	L2
116	August 13	Athletics	8–6	Santana (2–2)	Irvin (8–11)	Barlow (1)	26,761	41–75	W1
117	August 14	Athletics	3–8	Chafin (1–2)	Lyles (5–10)	—	31,904	41–76	L1
118	August 15	Athletics	7–4	Allard (3–10)	Manaea (8–8)	Barlow (2)	24,990	42–76	W1
119	August 17	Mariners	1–3	Anderson (6–8)	Hearn (2–4)	Sewald (5)	15,140	42–77	L1
120	August 18	Mariners	1–3	Gonzales (5–5)	Foltynewicz (2–12)	Steckenrider (5)	19,119	42–78	L2
121	August 19	Mariners	8–9 (10)	Smith (2–1)	Barlow (0–1)	Sewald (6)	16,391	42–79	L3
122	August 20	@ Red Sox	0–6	Sale (2–0)	Dunning (5–8)	—	30,012	42–80	L4
123	August 21	@ Red Sox	10–1	Lyles (6–10)	Rodríguez (9–7)	—	32,495	43–80	W1
—	August 22	@ Red Sox	Postponed (rain, makeup August 23)						
124	August 23	@ Red Sox	4–8 (11)	Whitlock (5–2)	Santana (2–3)	—	27,652	43–81	L1
125	August 24	@ Indians	7–3	Hearn (3–4)	Morgan (2–6)	—	11,369	44–81	W1
126	August 25	@ Indians	2–7	Plesac (8–4)	Latz (0–1)	—	11,398	44–82	L1
127	August 26	@ Indians	6–10	Stephan (3–0)	Lyles (6–11)	—	10,827	44–83	L2
128	August 27	Astros	4–5	Maton (3–0)	Martin (3–4)	Pressly (20)	29,286	44–84	L4
129	August 28	Astros	2–5	Valdez (9–4)	Allard (3–11)	Pressly (21)	37,810	44–85	L5
130	August 29	Astros	13–2	Hearn (4–4)	Greinke (11–5)	—	31,062	45–85	W1
131	August 30	Rockies	4–3	Alexy (1–0)	Márquez (11–10)	Barlow (3)	14,990	46–85	W2
132	August 31	Rockies	4–3	Lyles (7–11)	Gomber (9–9)	Patton (2)	18,383	47–85	W3

September: 12–15 (Home: 4–7; Away: 8–8)

#	Date	Opponent	Score	Win	Loss	Save	Attendance	Record	Streak
133	September 1	Rockies	5–9	Chacín (3–1)	Barlow (0–2)	—	14,747	47–86	L1
134	September 3	@ Angels	2–3	Ohtani (9–1)	Santana (2–4)	Iglesias (30)	19,074	47–87	L2
135	September 4	@ Angels	1–4	Suárez (6–7)	Allard (3–12)	—	22,697	47–88	L3
136	September 5	@ Angels	7–3	Hearn (5–4)	Junk (0–1)	—	18,492	48–88	W1
137	September 6	@ Angels	4–0	Alexy (2–0)	Barría (2–3)	—	16,241	49–88	W2
138	September 7	@ Diamondbacks	3–1	Lyles (8–11)	Gallen (2–9)	—	8,758	50–88	W3
139	September 8	@ Diamondbacks	8–5	Cotton (1–0)	Weaver (3–4)	Barlow (4)	6,354	51–88	W4
140	September 10	@ Athletics	5–10	Guerra (4–1)	Otto (0–1)	—	7,157	51–89	L1
141	September 11	@ Athletics	8–6	Martin (4–4)	Chafin (1–3)	Barlow (5)	7,945	52–89	W1
142	September 12	@ Athletics	4–3	Hearn (6–4)	Kaprielian (7–5)	Barlow (6)	6,983	53–89	W2
143	September 13	Astros	1–15	Javier (4–1)	Howard (0–4)	—	18,903	53–90	L1
144	September 14	Astros	8–1	Lyles (9–11)	Greinke (11–6)	—	19,451	54–90	W1
145	September 15	Astros	2–7	Urquidy (7–3)	Arihara (2–4)	—	20,991	54–91	L1
146	September 16	Astros	1–12	García (11–7)	Otto (0–2)	—	19,121	54–92	L2
147	September 17	White Sox	0–8	Cease (12–7)	Hearn (6–5)	—	28,288	54–93	L3
148	September 18	White Sox	2–1	Anderson (1–2)	Lynn (10–5)	Barlow (7)	31,121	55–93	W1
149	September 19	White Sox	2–7	Giolito (10–9)	Lyles (9–12)	—	24,918	55–94	L1
150	September 20	@ Yankees	3–4	Green (8–7)	Alexy (2–1)	Chapman (28)	22,160	55–95	L2
151	September 21	@ Yankees	1–7	Montgomery (6–6)	Dunning (5–9)	—	23,335	55–96	L3
152	September 22	@ Yankees	3–7	Green (9–7)	Patton (1–2)	—	25,170	55–97	L4
153	September 23	@ Orioles	0–3	Lowther (1–2)	Otto (0–3)	Wells (4)	6,328	55–98	L5
154	September 24	@ Orioles	8–5	Sborz (4–3)	Greene (1–3)	Barlow (8)	7,935	56–98	W1
155	September 25	@ Orioles	2–3	Kriske (2–1)	Lyles (9–13)	Tate (3)	10,645	56–99	L1
156	September 26	@ Orioles	7–4	Cotton (2–0)	Means (6–8)	Barlow (9)	13,495	57–99	W1
157	September 28	Angels	5–2	Alexy (3–1)	Naughton (0–4)	Barlow (10)	20,066	58–99	W2
158	September 29	Angels	2–7	Quijada (1–2)	Hearn (6–6)	—	23,241	58–100	L1
159	September 30	Angels	7–6	Patton (2–2)	Herget (2–3)	Barlow (11)	19,960	59–100	W1

October: 1–2 (Home: 1–2; Away: 0–0)

#	Date	Opponent	Score	Win	Loss	Save	Attendance	Record	Streak
160	October 1	Indians	6–9	Morgan (5–7)	Howard (0–5)	—	22,700	59–101	L1
161	October 2	Indians	7–2	Lyles (10–13)	McKenzie (5–9)	—	27,362	60–101	W1
162	October 3	Indians	0–6	Civale (6–0)	Dunning (5–10)	—	28,396	60–102	L1

== Roster ==
2021 Texas Rangers
Roster
Pitchers: 62 A. J. Alexy; 39 Kolby Allard; 58 Drew Anderson; 35 Kohei Arihara; 68 Joe Barlow; 63 Wes Benjamin; 51 Matt Bush; 54 Kyle Cody; 45 Jharel Cotton; 56 Brett de Geus; 33 Dane Dunning; 67 Demarcus Evans; 20 Mike Foltynewicz; 44 Kyle Gibson; 52 Taylor Hearn; 49 Jimmy Herget; 31 Spencer Howard; 31 Ian Kennedy; 60 John King; 73 Jake Latz; 24 Jordan Lyles; 59 Brett Martin; 49 Glenn Otto; 61 Spencer Patton; 57 Joely Rodríguez; 56 Dennis Santana; 66 Josh Sborz; 57 Nick Snyder; 47 Hunter Wood; 36 Hyeon-jong Yang	Catchers: 28 Jonah Heim; 6 John Hicks; 37 Yohel Pozo; 23 Jose Trevino; Infielders: 2 Charlie Culberson; 74 Ryan Dorow; 11 Ronald Guzmán; 65 Yonny Hernández; 16 Brock Holt; 77 Andy Ibáñez; 9 Isiah Kiner-Falefa; 30 Nate Lowe; 15 Nick Solak; 19 Anderson Tejeda; 83 Curtis Terry	Outfielders: 5 Willie Calhoun; 21 David Dahl; 4 Khris Davis; 13 Joey Gallo; 53 Adolis García; 50 Jason Martin; 38 DJ Peters; 3 Leody Taveras; 41 Eli White	Manager: 8 Chris Woodward; Coaches: 27 Tony Beasley (third base); 99 Callix Crabbe (assistant hitting); 66 Josh Frasier (bullpen catcher); 71 Doug Mathis (pitching); 18 Luis Ortiz (hitting); 43 Corey Ragsdale (first base); 85 Brendan Sagara (pitching); 22 Don Wakamatsu (bench); 88 Bobby Wilson (catching)

== Player stats ==
=== Batting ===
Note: G = Games played; AB = At bats; R = Runs; H = Hits; 2B = Doubles; 3B = Triples; HR = Home runs; RBI = Runs batting in; SB = Stolen bases; BB = Walks; AVG = Batting average; SLG = Slugging average

Player	G	AB	R	H	2B	3B	HR	RBI	SB	BB	AVG	SLG
Isiah Kiner-Falefa	158	635	74	172	25	3	8	53	20	28	.271	.357
Adolis García	149	581	77	141	26	2	31	90	16	32	.243	.454
Nathaniel Lowe	157	557	75	147	24	3	18	72	8	80	.264	.415
Nick Solak	127	458	57	111	18	2	11	49	7	34	.242	.362
Joey Gallo	95	310	57	69	6	1	25	55	6	74	.223	.490
Jose Trevino	89	285	23	68	14	0	5	30	1	12	.239	.340
Jonah Heim	82	265	22	52	13	0	10	32	3	15	.196	.358
Willie Calhoun	75	260	26	65	10	3	6	25	0	21	.250	.381
Andy Ibáñez	76	253	31	70	15	2	7	25	0	15	.277	.435
Charlie Culberson	90	247	23	60	15	2	5	22	7	17	.243	.381
Brock Holt	76	235	21	49	13	1	2	23	5	23	.209	.298
David Dahl	63	205	19	43	11	0	4	18	2	10	.210	.322
Eli White	64	198	26	35	6	1	6	15	4	18	.177	.308
DJ Peters	52	197	24	39	7	1	12	34	2	4	.198	.426
Leody Taveras	49	174	14	28	6	2	3	9	10	9	.161	.270
Jason Martin	58	144	14	30	3	0	6	17	3	8	.208	.354
Yonny Hernández	43	143	15	31	5	0	0	6	11	17	.217	.252
Yohel Pozo	21	74	8	21	4	0	1	9	0	3	.284	.378
Khris Davis	22	51	8	8	1	1	2	5	0	8	.157	.333
Curtis Terry	13	45	3	4	2	0	0	1	0	2	.089	.133
John Hicks	10	31	6	8	1	0	4	7	0	0	.258	.677
Ronald Guzmán	7	16	1	1	0	0	1	1	0	1	.063	.250
Anderson Tejeda	5	16	1	1	0	0	0	0	1	1	.063	.063
Ryan Dorow	3	6	0	0	0	0	0	0	0	1	.000	.000
Pitcher totals	162	19	0	1	0	0	0	0	0	0	.053	.053
Team totals	162	5405	625	1254	225	24	167	598	106	433	.232	.375

=== Pitching ===
Note: W = Wins; L = Losses; ERA = Earned run average; G = Games pitched; GS = Games started; SV = Saves; IP = Innings pitched; H = Hits allowed; R = Runs allowed; ER = Earned runs allowed; BB = Walks allowed; SO = Walks allowed

Player	W	L	ERA	G	GS	SV	IP	H	R	ER	BB	SO
Jordan Lyles	10	13	5.15	32	30	0	180.0	194	104	103	56	146
Mike Foltynewicz	2	12	5.44	28	24	0	139.0	139	86	84	36	97
Kolby Allard	3	12	5.41	32	17	0	124.2	128	80	75	31	104
Dane Dunning	5	10	4.51	27	25	0	117.2	126	61	59	43	114
Kyle Gibson	6	3	2.87	19	19	0	113.0	92	38	36	41	94
Taylor Hearn	6	6	4.66	42	11	0	104.1	96	58	54	42	92
Brett Martin	4	4	3.18	66	0	0	62.1	67	31	22	14	42
Josh Sborz	4	3	3.97	63	0	1	59.0	52	29	26	32	69
John King	7	5	3.52	27	0	0	46.0	41	24	18	12	40
Spencer Patton	2	2	3.83	42	0	2	42.1	36	20	18	15	48
Kohei Arihara	2	4	6.64	10	10	0	40.2	45	31	30	13	24
Dennis Santana	2	4	3.63	39	0	0	39.2	30	20	16	21	38
Yang Hyeon-jong	0	3	5.60	12	4	0	35.1	42	24	22	16	25
Ian Kennedy	0	0	2.51	32	0	16	32.1	27	9	9	7	35
Jharel Cotton	2	0	3.52	23	0	0	30.2	28	12	12	15	30
Joe Barlow	0	2	1.55	31	0	11	29.0	12	9	5	12	27
Joely Rodríguez	1	3	5.93	31	0	1	27.1	32	19	18	12	30
Brett de Geus	0	0	8.44	19	0	0	26.2	31	25	25	13	26
DeMarcus Evans	0	2	5.13	25	0	0	26.1	24	16	15	16	33
Glenn Otto	0	3	9.26	6	6	0	23.1	32	24	24	8	28
A. J. Alexy	3	1	4.70	5	4	0	23.0	13	12	12	17	17
Wes Benjamin	0	2	8.74	13	2	0	22.2	29	23	22	17	19
Drew Anderson	1	1	3.27	9	1	0	22.0	20	8	8	6	9
Spencer Howard	0	3	9.70	8	8	0	21.1	28	26	23	10	21
Kyle Cody	0	2	7.94	7	0	0	11.1	16	11	10	2	14
Hunter Wood	0	0	3.60	5	0	0	5.0	2	2	2	2	5
Jake Latz	0	1	5.79	1	1	0	4.2	5	3	3	0	4
Matt Bush	0	0	6.75	4	0	0	4.0	4	3	3	1	5
Jimmy Herget	0	1	9.00	4	0	0	4.0	5	5	4	0	2
Nick Snyder	0	0	4.91	4	0	0	3.2	3	2	2	3	1
Charlie Culberson	0	0	0.00	2	0	0	2.0	2	0	0	0	0
Brock Holt	0	0	0.00	1	0	0	1.0	1	0	0	0	0
Team totals	60	102	4.79	162	162	31	1424.1	1402	815	758	513	1239

== Farm system ==
Level	Team	League	Manager
Triple-A	Round Rock Express	Triple-A West	Kenny Holmberg
Double-A	Frisco RoughRiders	Double-A Central	Jared Goedert
High-A	Hickory Crawdads	High-A East	Josh Johnson
Low-A	Down East Wood Ducks	Low-A East	Carlos Cardoza
Rookie	ACL Rangers	Arizona Complex League	Jay Sullenger
Foreign Rookie	DSL Rangers 1	Dominican Summer League	Carlos Maldonado
Foreign Rookie	DSL Rangers 2	Dominican Summer League	TBD
