= Anthony Alford =

American baseball player (born 1994)

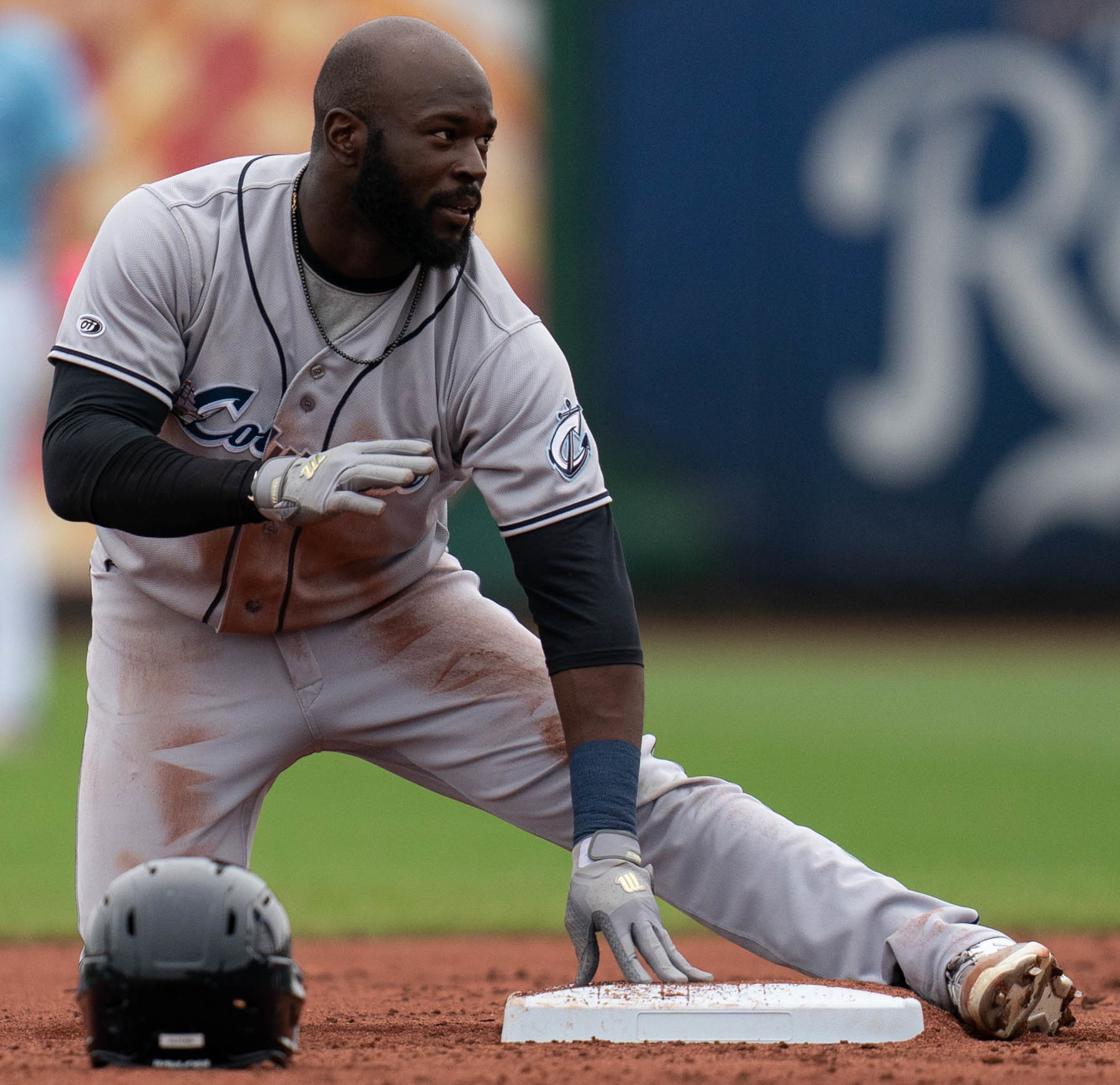
- Alford with the Columbus Clippers in 2022
- Outfielder
- Born: July 20, 1994 (age 32); Columbia, Mississippi, U.S.
- Batted: Right Threw: Right

Professional debut
- MLB: May 19, 2017, for the Toronto Blue Jays
- KBO: June 14, 2022, for the KT Wiz

Last appearance
- MLB: April 23, 2022, for the Pittsburgh Pirates
- KBO: October 10, 2023, for the KT Wiz

MLB statistics
- Batting average: .209
- Home runs: 8
- Runs batted in: 20

KBO statistics
- Batting average: .288
- Home runs: 29
- Runs batted in: 120
- Stats at Baseball Reference

Teams
- Toronto Blue Jays (2017–2020); Pittsburgh Pirates (2020–2022); KT Wiz (2022–2023)

Anthony Joseph Alford (born July 20, 1994) is an American former professional baseball outfielder. He played in Major League Baseball (MLB) for the Toronto Blue Jays and Pittsburgh Pirates, and in the KBO League for the KT Wiz.

== High school and college ==
Alford attended Petal High School in Mississippi, where he was the quarterback of the football team in addition to playing baseball. As a senior, he recorded 2,058 passing yards and 20 passing touchdowns, in addition to 1,731 rushing yards and 24 rushing touchdowns, and played in the U.S. Army All-American Bowl. In the same year, he batted .483 with four home runs and stole 14 bases in 14 attempts.

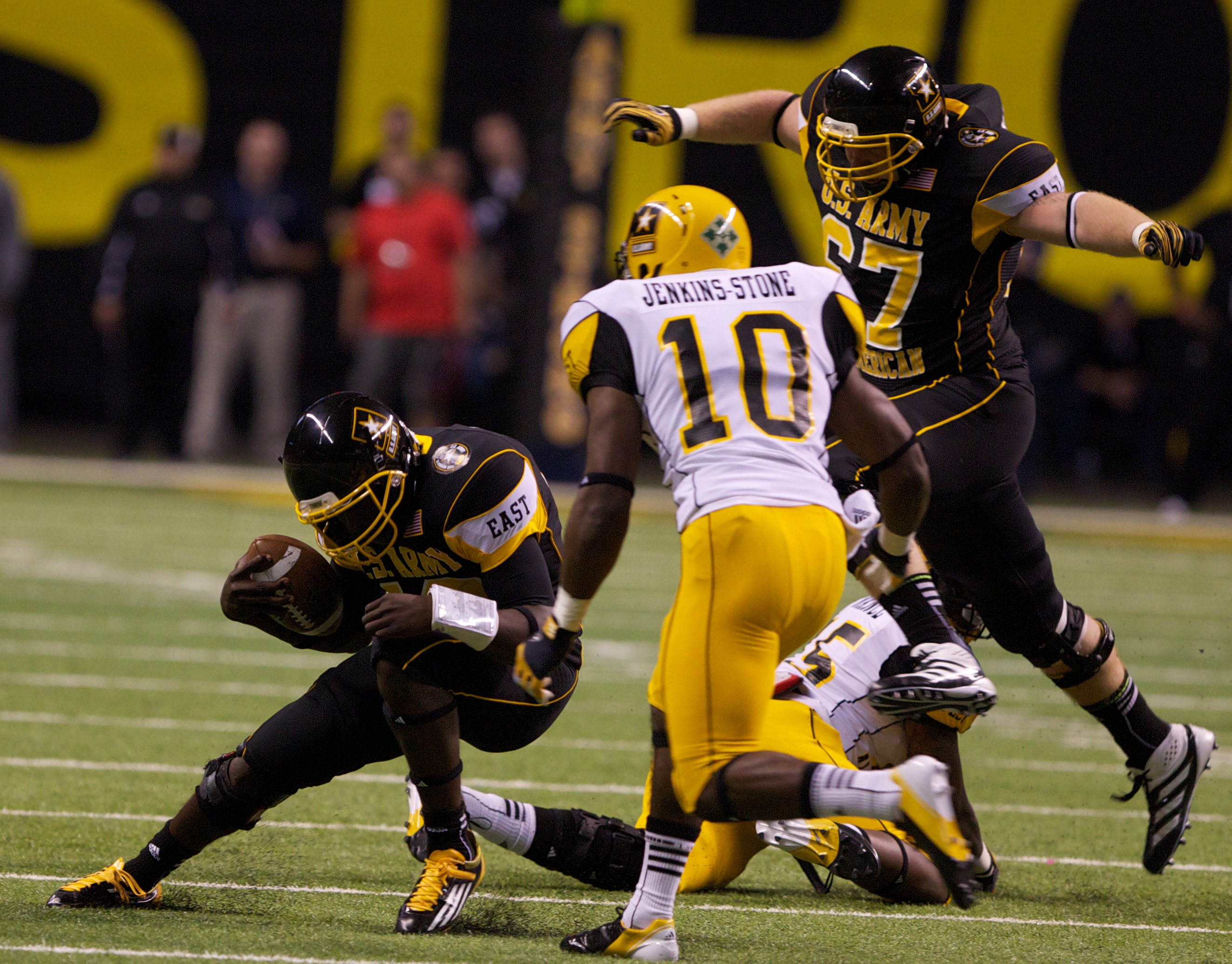
Alford (left) playing quarterback for the East team in the 2012 U.S. Army All-American Bowl

Alford attended University of Southern Mississippi, where he played college football. In the 2012 season, he contributed to the team as the starting quarterback in only five games due in part to a suspension for getting into a fight on campus. He was a dual-threat quarterback with the Golden Eagles. In the 2012 season, he was 57-of-127 for 664 yards and two touchdowns through the air. He had 105 carries for 329 yards and six touchdowns on the ground. Due to a coaching change at Southern Miss and his ineffectiveness at quarterback, Alford transferred to the University of Mississippi where he also struggled.

== Professional career ==
=== Toronto Blue Jays ===
Alford was projected as a first-round talent going into the 2012 Major League Baseball draft, but made it clear that his intention was to continue playing football, leading many teams to pass over him due to signability concerns. The Toronto Blue Jays drafted Alford in the third round, 112th overall. He signed a contract with Toronto which paid him a $750,000 bonus and allowed him to attend university to play football, and then play baseball in the summer.

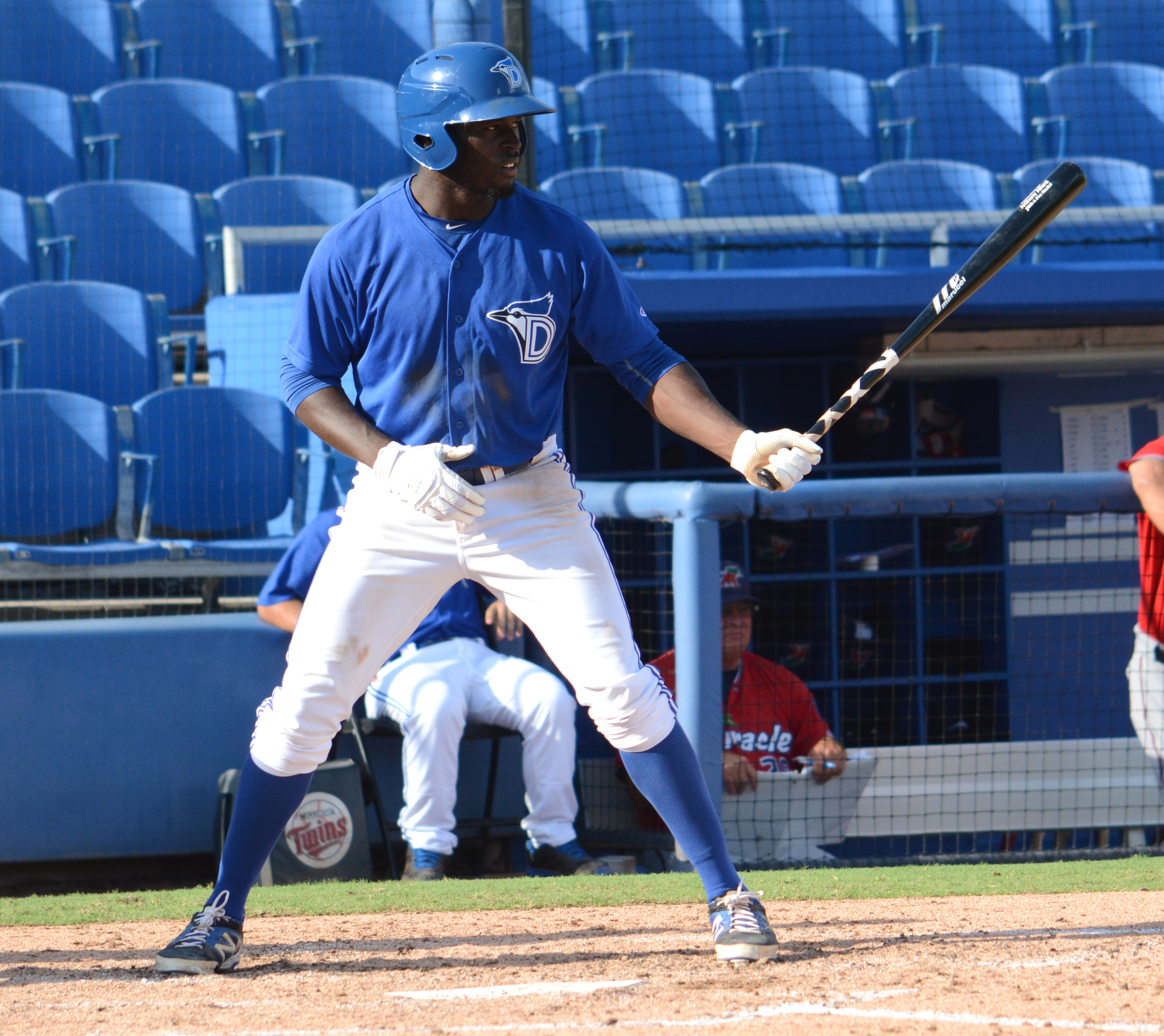
Alford with the Dunedin Blue Jays in 2015

Alford made his professional baseball debut as a member of the Gulf Coast League Blue Jays in 2012 and played in five games, where he hit .167 with one home run and four stolen bases. Following the baseball season, he began attending the University of Southern Mississippi as a member of the football team, but transferred to the University of Mississippi after one year following an on-campus fight. Alford played six games in the Gulf Coast League in 2013, batting .227 with two RBI and two stolen bases. Due to NCAA transfer rules, he was not allowed to play football for the Ole Miss Rebels in 2013. The following year, Alford played nine games for the Bluefield Blue Jays of the Appalachian League and was then promoted to the Single-A Lansing Lugnuts for five games. In total, he batted .259 with two home runs, five RBI, and five stolen bases. He was relegated to a backup safety role for the Rebels in 2014, and made just six tackles in four games. On September 30, 2014, it was announced that Alford was leaving Ole Miss to join the Blue Jays organization full-time, and planning on attending their fall instructional league before playing in the Australian Baseball League. He would go on to play 36 games with the Canberra Cavalry, and batted .200 with three home runs, eight RBI, and seven stolen bases.

Alford opened the 2015 season with the Lansing Lugnuts. On June 5, he was named a Midwest League midseason All-Star. At that time, Alford led the league with a .446 on-base percentage. He was promoted to the High-A Dunedin Blue Jays on June 25, and played the remainder of the season there. Alford played in 107 total games in 2015, and batted .298 with four home runs, 35 RBI, and 27 stolen bases. He was invited to Major League spring training on January 12, 2016, and reassigned to minor league camp on March 12. Alford was assigned to the Dunedin Blue Jays to open the 2016 minor league season. On June 10, Alford suffered a concussion after colliding with a teammate in the outfield, and needed to be stretchered off the field. He returned from injury on June 22. Alford struggled in 2016, batting at or near the Mendoza Line for the first half of the year. Near the end of July, he appeared to find his stroke, raising his season batting average to a high of .249 on August 16. He finished the season with a .236 average, nine home runs, 44 RBI, and 18 stolen bases. After the 2016 season, the Blue Jays assigned Alford to the Mesa Solar Sox of the Arizona Fall League. On October 31, Alford was named an AFL All-Star. The Blue Jays added him to their 40-man roster after the season to protect him from the Rule 5 draft. Alford appeared in 23 games for Mesa during the Fall League season, and hit .253 with three home runs and 15 RBI. He was named an AFL Rising Star at the end of the season.

Alford took part in 2017 Major League spring training, and was praised by manager John Gibbons for the improvements he had made over the past year. On March 17, he was assigned to the Double-A New Hampshire Fisher Cats. Prior to the start of the season, Alford was ranked third on Major League Baseball's 2017 Top 30 Blue Jays prospects list, and 70th on the Top 100 MLB prospects list. In 33 games with New Hampshire, Alford hit .325 with three home runs, 11 RBI, and nine stolen bases before being called up to the majors.

==== Major leagues ====
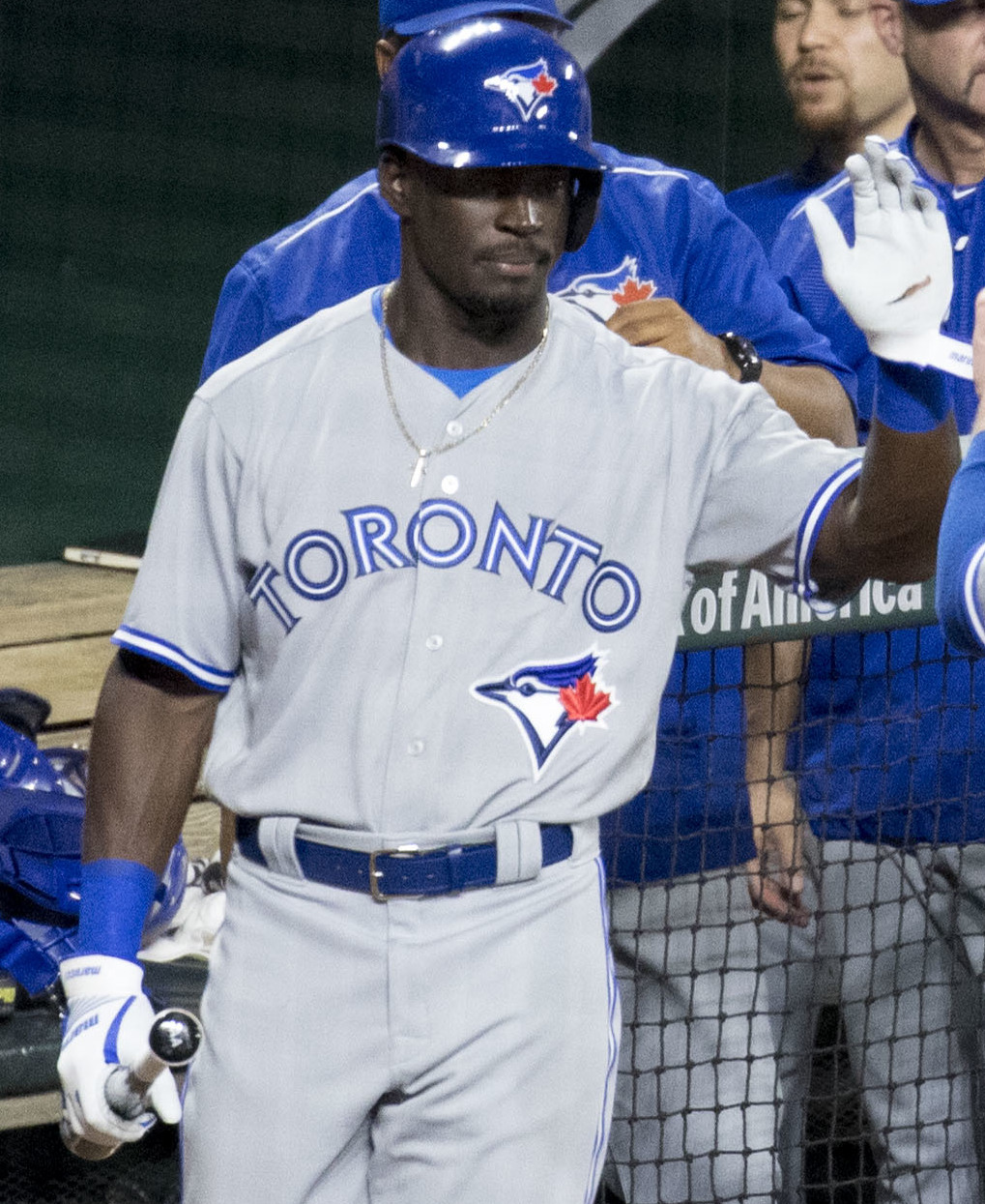
Alford with the Toronto Blue Jays in 2017

On May 19, 2017, Alford was called up by the Blue Jays. He started in left field and batted eighth, going 0-for-2 with a strikeout in his debut against the Baltimore Orioles. In Toronto's 4–3 victory over the Milwaukee Brewers on May 23, Alford was called on to pinch-hit in the seventh inning and recorded a double for the first hit of his career. He was placed on the 10-day disabled list with a fractured wrist the next day. After recovering from the injury, Alford was optioned to Double-A New Hampshire. He earned a late season promotion to the Triple-A Buffalo Bisons, where he finished the 2017 season. In 77 minor league games, Alford hit .299 with five home runs, 29 RBI, and 19 stolen bases.

In January 2018, Baseball America ranked Alford as the third-best Blue Jays prospect, and 60th overall in baseball. He was recalled by the Blue Jays on May 5, 2018, and optioned back to Buffalo on May 13. On September 23, 2019, in bottom of the 15th inning, Alford hit his first major league home run to give Toronto an 11–10 victory over the Orioles. On August 20, 2020, Alford was designated for assignment.

=== Pittsburgh Pirates ===
On August 27, 2020, Alford was claimed off waivers by the Pittsburgh Pirates. He homered in his first start as a Pirate. On September 5, 2020, Alford suffered a fractured right elbow after crashing into the outfield wall attempting to catch a Tucker Barnhart home run in a game against the Cincinnati Reds. The next day Alford was placed on the injured list and missed the remainder of the season. On April 21, 2021, Alford was designated for assignment following the waiver claim of Ka'ai Tom after getting off to a .083/.241/.083 start to the season with no home runs or RBI. On April 25, Alford was outrighted to the alternate training site. On August 7, 2021, Alford's contract was selected by the Pirates. He was designated for assignment on April 24, 2022. He cleared waivers and was sent outright to the Triple-A Indianapolis Indians on April 29. Alford elected free agency on May 1.

=== Cleveland Guardians ===
On May 3, 2022, Alford signed a minor league contract with the Cleveland Guardians.

=== KT Wiz ===
On May 25, 2022, Alford signed a one-year, $577,000 contract with the KT Wiz of the KBO League. In 80 games for the team, he batted .286/.362/.509 with 14 home runs and 50 RBI.

On December 8, 2022, Alford re-signed with the Wiz on a one-year contract for worth $1.1 million. In 133 games for the club in 2023, he hit .289/.357/.456 with 15 home runs, 70 RBI, and 17 stolen bases. Alford became a free agent following the 2023 season.

=== Cincinnati Reds ===
On February 12, 2024, Alford signed a minor league contract with the Cincinnati Reds. In 12 games for the Double–A Chattanooga Lookouts, he batted .222/.317/.361 with one home run and five RBI. On May 9, Alford was released by the Reds organization.

=== Piratas de Campeche ===
On May 17, 2024, Alford signed with the Piratas de Campeche of the Mexican League. In 39 games for Campeche, he hit .271/.353/.511 with eight home runs, 25 RBI, and two stolen bases. Alford was released by the Piratas on January 10, 2025.

== Personal life ==
Alford and professional baseball pitcher Demarcus Evans are cousins.
