= Scott Heineman =

American baseball player (born 1992)

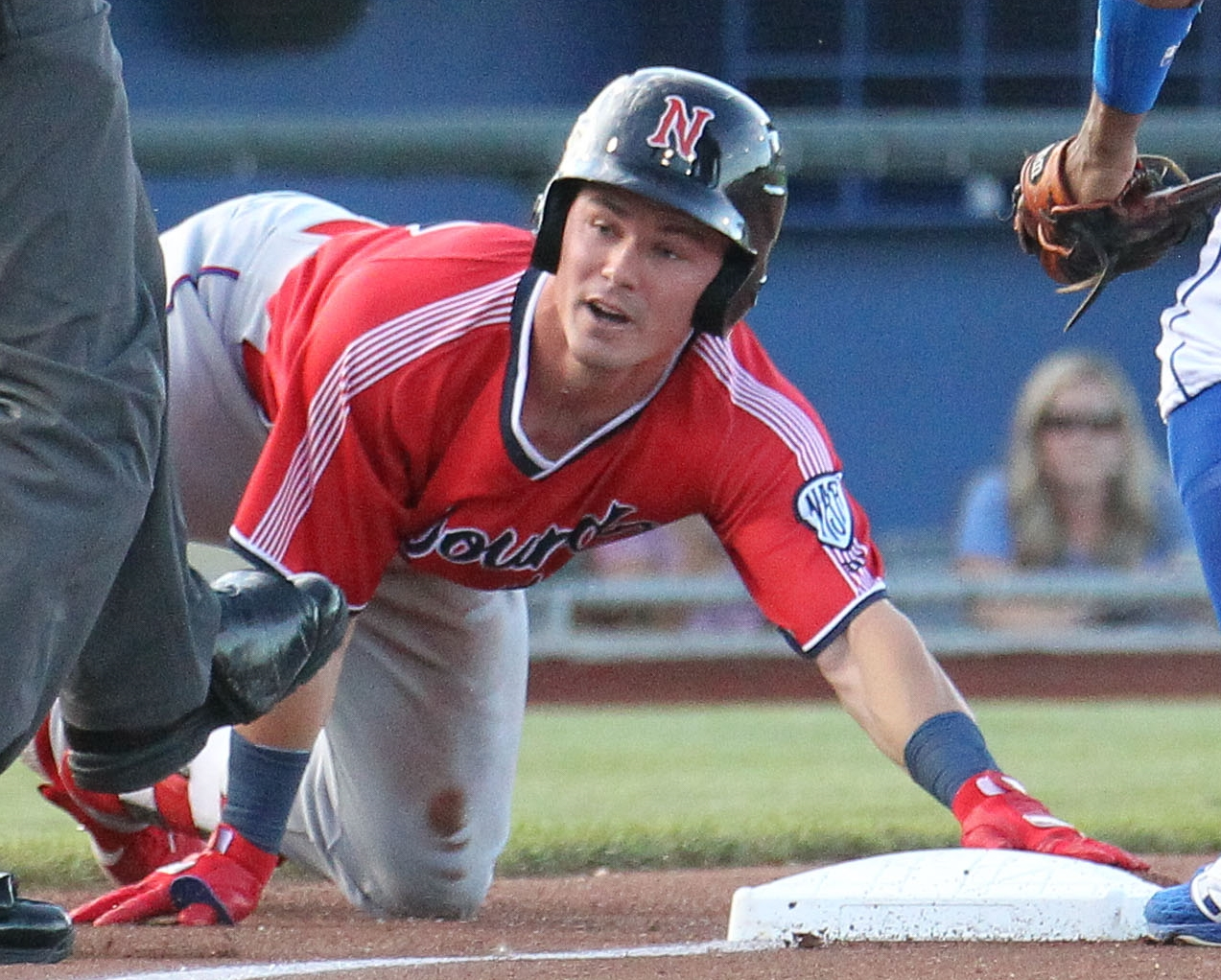
- Heineman with the Nashville Sounds in 2019
- Outfielder / First baseman
- Born: December 4, 1992 (age 33); Los Angeles, California, U.S.
- Batted: Right Threw: Right

Professional debut
- MLB: August 2, 2019, for the Texas Rangers
- NPB: September 10, 2021, for the Yomiuri Giants

Last appearance
- MLB: June 27, 2021, for the Cincinnati Reds
- NPB: September 22, 2021, for the Yomiuri Giants

MLB statistics
- Batting average: .172
- Home runs: 5
- Runs batted in: 17

NPB statistics
- Batting average: .160
- Home runs: 0
- Runs batted in: 2
- Stats at Baseball Reference

Teams
- Texas Rangers (2019–2020); Cincinnati Reds (2021); Yomiuri Giants (2021)

Scott Matthew Heineman (born December 4, 1992) is an American former professional baseball outfielder and first baseman. He played in Major League Baseball (MLB) for the Texas Rangers and Cincinnati Reds.

== Amateur career ==
Heineman attended Crespi Carmelite High School in Encino, California. Undrafted out of high school, he attended the University of Oregon, where he played college baseball for the Oregon Ducks from 2012 through 2015. In 2013, he played collegiate summer baseball with the Brewster Whitecaps of the Cape Cod Baseball League, and was named a league all-star. He played in only 8 games in 2014 before undergoing season-ending surgery on a torn labrum in his hip, resulting in a red-shirt season. The Kansas City Royals selected him in the 19th round of the 2014 MLB draft, but he did not sign, and returned to Oregon for 2015. The Texas Rangers selected Heineman in the 11th round, 318th overall, of the 2015 MLB draft and signed him for $100,000.

== Professional career ==
=== Texas Rangers ===
Heineman underwent season-ending surgery on his right ankle on July 1, 2015, without having appeared in any professional games that season. He made his professional debut and spent the entire 2016 season with the High Desert Mavericks of the California League, hitting .303/.386/.505/.891 with 17 home runs, 80 RBI, and 30 stolen bases. He spent the 2017 season with the Frisco RoughRiders of the Texas League, hitting .284/.363/.427/.790 with 9 home runs, 44 RBI, and 12 stolen bases. In 2018, Heineman played in 107 games for the Round Rock Express of the Triple-A Pacific Coast League (PCL) and 7 games for the Roughriders. He was named to the PCL All-Star Team and participated Triple-A All-Star Game. He hit a combined .306/.371/.445/.816 with 12 home runs, 67 RBI, and 18 stolen bases in the 2018 season.

During the 2018 off-season, Heineman played for the Leones del Escogido of the Dominican Winter League. The Rangers placed him on their 40-man roster following the 2018 season. Heineman was named the recipient of the Rangers' 2018 minor league Tom Grieve Player of the Year award. Heineman underwent surgery on his left shoulder (labrum) in December 2018. On March 3, 2019, he was placed on the 60-day injured list as he recovered from shoulder surgery. After rehabbing with the AZL Rangers of the Rookie-level Arizona League and the Nashville Sounds of the Triple-A Pacific Coast League, he was activated from the injured list on July 3 and optioned to Nashville. Between the two levels, he hit a combined .347/.415/.591/1.006 with 10 home runs and 31 RBI over 46 games.

The Rangers promoted Heineman to the major leagues on August 2, 2019. He made his major league debut that day versus the Detroit Tigers, recording his first career hit off Tyler Alexander. On September 3, Heineman hit his first major league home run off Jonathan Loáisiga. In 25 games for Texas in 2019, Heineman hit .213/.306/.373/.679 with 2 home runs and 7 RBI. In 24 games for Texas in 2020, he hit .154/.185/.269/.454 with 1 home run and 7 RBI.

On December 2, 2020, Heineman was non-tendered by Texas. On December 3, 2020, Heineman re-signed with the Rangers on a major league contract. However, on December 11, after the Rangers signed Jimmy Herget, Heineman was designated for assignment.

=== Cincinnati Reds ===
On December 16, 2020, the Rangers traded Heineman to the Cincinnati Reds in exchange for José Acosta. He was assigned to the Triple-A Louisville Bats to begin the 2021 season. The Reds promoted Heineman to the active roster on May 21, 2021. In 19 games for Cincinnati, Heineman struggled to a .100/.206/.300 slash line with 2 home runs and 3 RBI before being designated for assignment on June 28. He was outrighted to Louisville on July 1. Heineman hit .279/.353/.410 with 1 home run and 4 RBI in 17 games for Louisville before he was released on July 19.

=== Yomiuri Giants ===
On August 6, 2021, Heineman signed with the Yomiuri Giants of the Nippon Professional Baseball (NPB) for $300,000. He became a free agent following the season.

=== Seattle Mariners ===
On June 6, 2022, Heineman signed a minor league contract with the Seattle Mariners. In 29 games for the Triple–A Tacoma Rainiers, he batted .190/.277/.310 with two home runs, 15 RBI, and five stolen bases. Heineman was released by the Mariners organization on August 11.

== Personal life ==
Heineman's brother, Tyler, is a professional baseball catcher. Their father, Steve, served in the Santa Monica Police Department.
