= Kohei Arihara =

Japanese baseball player (born 1992)

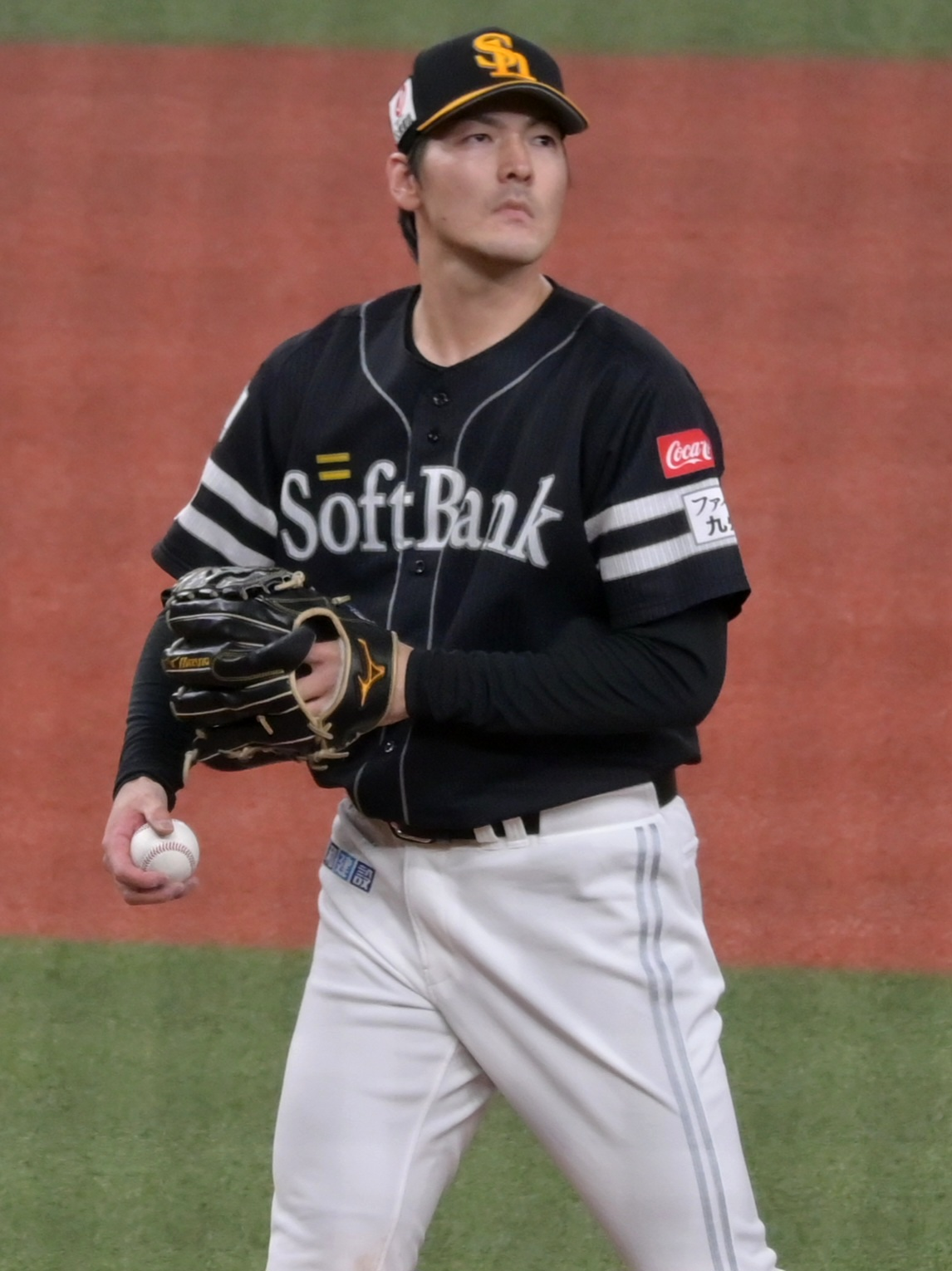
- Arihara with the Fukuoka SoftBank Hawks

Hokkaido Nippon-Ham Fighters – No. 74
- Pitcher
- Born: August 11, 1992 (age 34); Hiroshima, Japan
- Bats: Right Throws: Right

Professional debut
- NPB: May 15, 2015, for the Hokkaido Nippon-Ham Fighters
- MLB: April 3, 2021, for the Texas Rangers

NPB statistics (through August 18, 2026)
- Win–loss record: 103-77
- Earned run average: 3.36
- Strikeouts: 1009

MLB statistics (through 2022 season)
- Win–loss record: 3–7
- Earned run average: 7.57
- Strikeouts: 38
- Stats at Baseball Reference

Teams
- Hokkaido Nippon-Ham Fighters (2015–2020); Texas Rangers (2021–2022); Fukuoka SoftBank Hawks (2023–2025); Hokkaido Nippon-Ham Fighters (2026–present)

Career highlights and awards
- 3× Pacific League wins leader (2019, 2024 , 2025); Pacific League Rookie of the Year (2015); 3× NPB All-Star (2016, 2019, 2024); 2× Japan Series champion (2016, 2025)

Kohei Arihara (有原 航平, Arihara Kōhei; born August 11, 1992) is a Japanese professional baseball pitcher for the Hokkaido Nippon-Ham Fighters of Nippon Professional Baseball (NPB). He has previously played in Major League Baseball (MLB) for the Texas Rangers, and in NPB for the Fukuoka SoftBank Hawks.

== Early baseball career ==
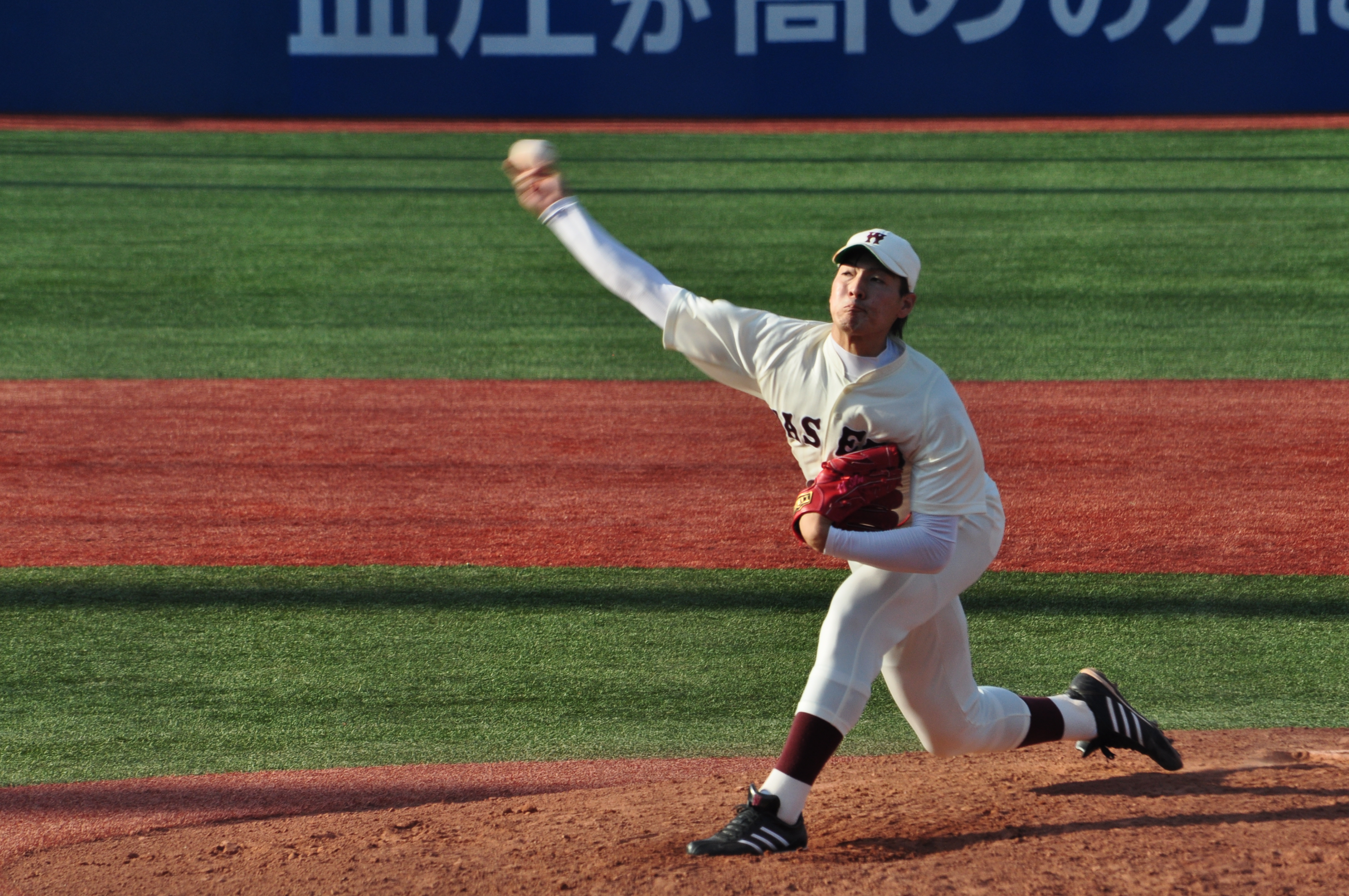
Arihara with the Waseda University Baseball Club

Arihara entered Koryo High School, participated in the spring 82rd Japanese High School Baseball Invitational Tournament and the summer 92rd Japanese High School Baseball Championship in his third year.

He also entered Waseda University, and won the Best ERA leader Award in the Tokyo Big6 Baseball League in the fall of his junior year, and was selected for the Best Nine Award in the spring of his senior year.

== Professional career ==
=== Hokkaido Nippon-Ham Fighters ===
The Hokkaido Nippon-Ham Fighters selected Arihara with the third selection in the 2014 NPB draft.

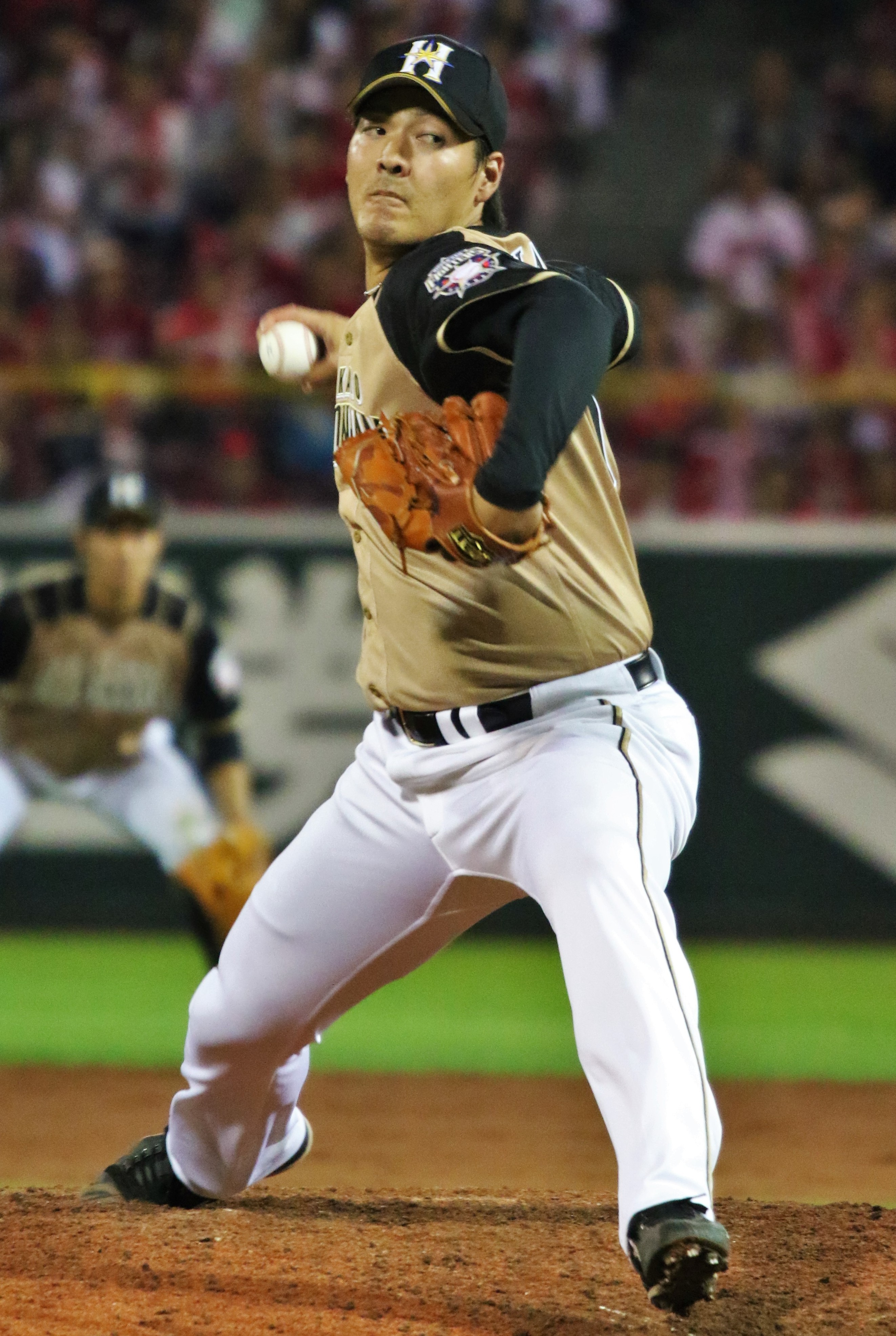
Arihara with the Fighters in 2018

On May 15, 2015, Arihara made his NPB debut. He won the Pacific League Rookie of the Year after pitching to an 8–8 record with 102 strikeouts. Arihara won the Japan Series in the 2016 season, and was also a NPB All-Star after he posted a 2.94 ERA and 11–9 record in 22 appearances.

In 2017, Arihara registered a 10–13 record and 4.74 ERA in 25 appearances. In 20 games in 2018, Arihara pitched to a 8–5 record and a 4.55 ERA with 87 strikeouts. In 2019, Arihara led the NPB in wins, with 15, and was named an All-Star for the second time in his career. In 2020, Arihara recorded an 8–9 record and 3.46 ERA in 20 games.

After the 2020 season, on November 26, 2020, the Fighters announced they were allowing Arihara to enter the posting system to play in Major League Baseball (MLB).

=== Texas Rangers ===
On December 26, 2020, Arihara signed a two-year contract worth $6.2 million with the Texas Rangers of MLB. On April 3, 2021, Arihara made his MLB debut as the starting pitcher against the Kansas City Royals, allowing three earned runs in five innings of work with one strikeout. On May 22, it was revealed that Arihara had a posterior humeral circumflex artery aneurysm in his right shoulder, which required surgery, ruling him out for at least 12 weeks. On May 26, he was placed on the 60-day injured list. On September 1, Arihara was activated from the injured list. On September 19, Arihara was designated for assignment by the Rangers.

Arihara had his contract selected back to the major league roster on August 16, 2022. In a September 10 start against the Toronto Blue Jays, Arihara was clobbered for 11 earned runs on 12 hits and five walks over three innings pitched. The next day, Arihara was designated for assignment, with a cumulative 9.45 ERA in five games. He cleared waivers and was sent outright to the Triple–A Round Rock Express on September 14. Arihara elected free agency following the season on November 6.

=== Fukuoka SoftBank Hawks ===
On January 6, 2023, Arihara returned to Japan, signing a contract with the Fukuoka SoftBank Hawks of Nippon Professional Baseball (NPB). In the interleague play against the Yokohama DeNA Baystars on June 6, Arihara pitched for the first time since returning to NPB. He also earned his first win with the Hawks on June 13 in the interleague play against the Tokyo Yakult Swallows. In 2023 season, he finished the regular season with a 10–5 win–loss record, a 2.31 ERA, and a 74 strikeouts in 120 2/3 innings.

In 2024, Arihara had a 14–7 record and a 2.36 ERA with 137 strikeouts in 182 2/3 innings pitched across 26 appearances. He started Game 1 of the 2024 Japan Series.

Arihara made 26 appearances for Fukuoka in 2025, compiling a 14-9 record and 3.03 ERA with 121 strikeouts over 175 innings of work. With the Hawks, Arihara won the 2025 Japan Series. He became a free agent at the end of the season.

=== Hokkaido Nippon-Ham Fighters (second stint) ===
On December 24, 2025, Ariahara signed a four-year, $15.4 million contract with the Hokkaido Nippon-Ham Fighters of Nippon Professional Baseball.
