= Ryan Dorow =

American baseball player (born 1995)

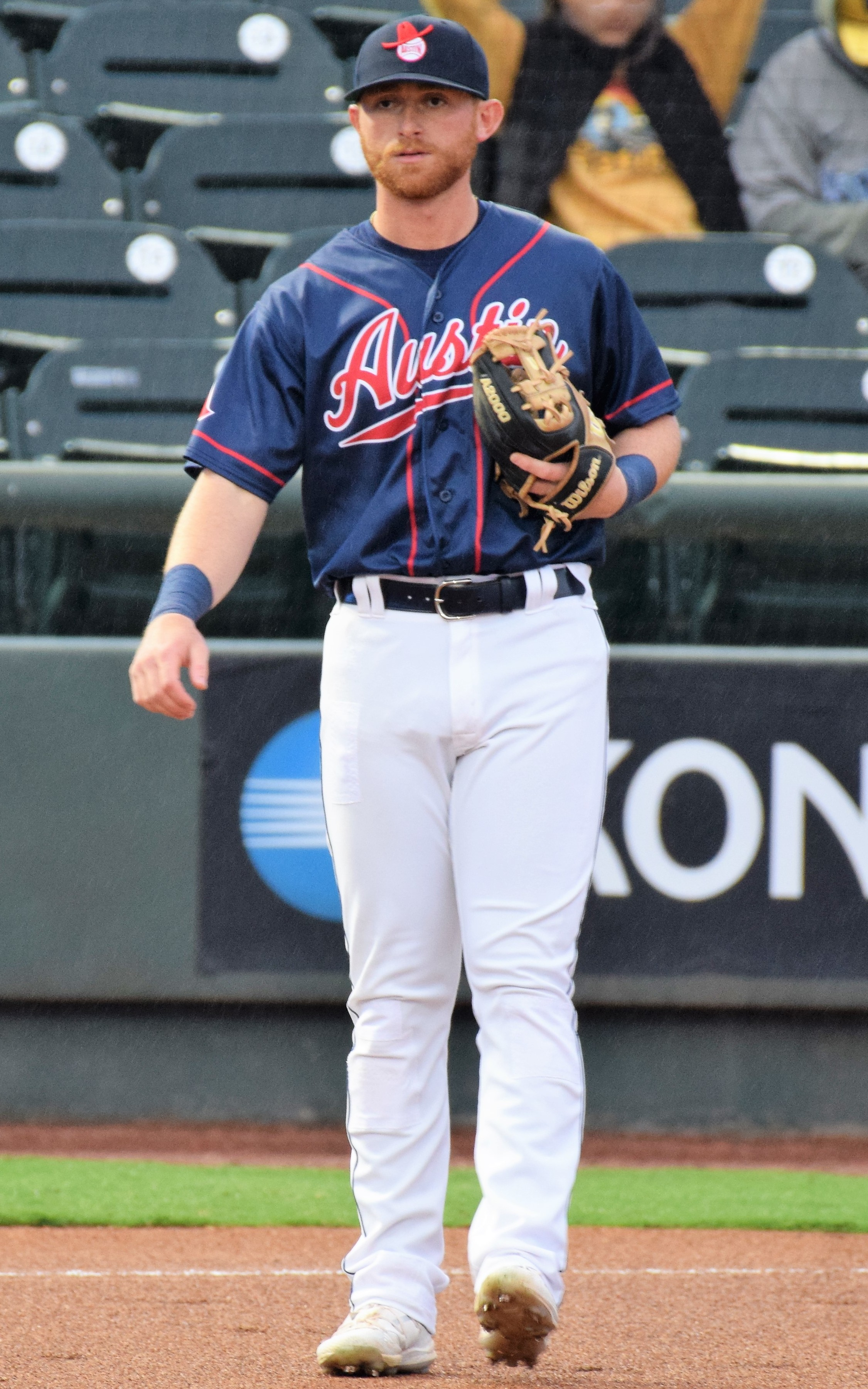
- Dorow with the Round Rock Express in 2022

Hope Flying Dutchmen
- Head coach / Infielder
- Born: August 21, 1995 (age 30); South Haven, Michigan, U.S.
- Batted: Right Threw: Right

MLB debut
- August 26, 2021, for the Texas Rangers

Last MLB appearance
- August 31, 2021, for the Texas Rangers

MLB statistics
- Batting average: .000
- Home runs: 0
- Runs batted in: 0
- Stats at Baseball Reference

Teams
- As player: Texas Rangers (2021); As coach: Hope College (2024–present)

Ryan Patrick Dorow (born August 21, 1995) is an American former professional baseball infielder, who is the current head baseball coach of the Hope College Flying Dutchmen. He played in Major League Baseball (MLB) for the Texas Rangers.

== Amateur career ==
Dorow attended South Haven High School in South Haven, Michigan. Undrafted out of high school in 2013, he attended Adrian College to play college baseball for the Bulldogs. He was a four-year starter at shortstop for Adrian from 2014 through 2017. He played for the Battle Creek Bombers of the Northwoods League in 2016. Dorow was drafted by the Texas Rangers in the 30th round, with the 914th overall selection, of the 2017 MLB draft.

== Professional career ==
Dorow split his professional debut season of 2017 between the AZL Rangers of the Rookie-level Arizona League and the Hickory Crawdads of the Single–A South Atlantic League, hitting a combined .297/.381/.391 with 17 RBI. He spent the 2018 season with Hickory, hitting .271/.342/.425 with 12 home runs and 61 RBI. Dorow split the 2019 season between the Down East Wood Ducks of the High–A Carolina League and the Frisco RoughRiders of the Double-A Texas League, hitting a combined .243/.351/.368/.719 with 12 home runs and 61 RBI. Dorow did not play in 2020 due to the cancelation of the minor league season because of the COVID-19 pandemic. He split the 2021 minor league season between Frisco and the Round Rock Express of the Triple-A West, hitting a combined .255/.333/.461 with 15 home runs and 47 RBI.

The Rangers promoted Dorow to the major leagues for the first time on August 24, 2021. Due to 2021 MLB COVID-19 outbreak rules, his addition to the 40-man roster was temporary. He made his major league debut on August 26. He was returned to Round Rock and removed from the roster on September 1. Dorow spent the 2022 season back with Round Rock, playing in 112 games and hitting .237/.322/.353 with 6 home runs and 44 RBI.

In spring training in 2023, Dorow suffered a separated left shoulder in a play at the plate. As a result, he missed the entirety of the season, and elected free agency following the year on November 6, 2023.

On December 13, 2023, Dorow re-signed with the Rangers on a minor league contract. However, on February 21, 2024, Dorow retired from professional baseball.

== Coaching career ==
After retiring, Dorow spent the 2024 season as an assistant coach and recruiting coordinator for Hope College. Following the 2024 season, Dorow was promoted to Head Coach of the Hope College Flying Dutchmen.
