= A. J. Alexy =

American baseball player (born 1998)

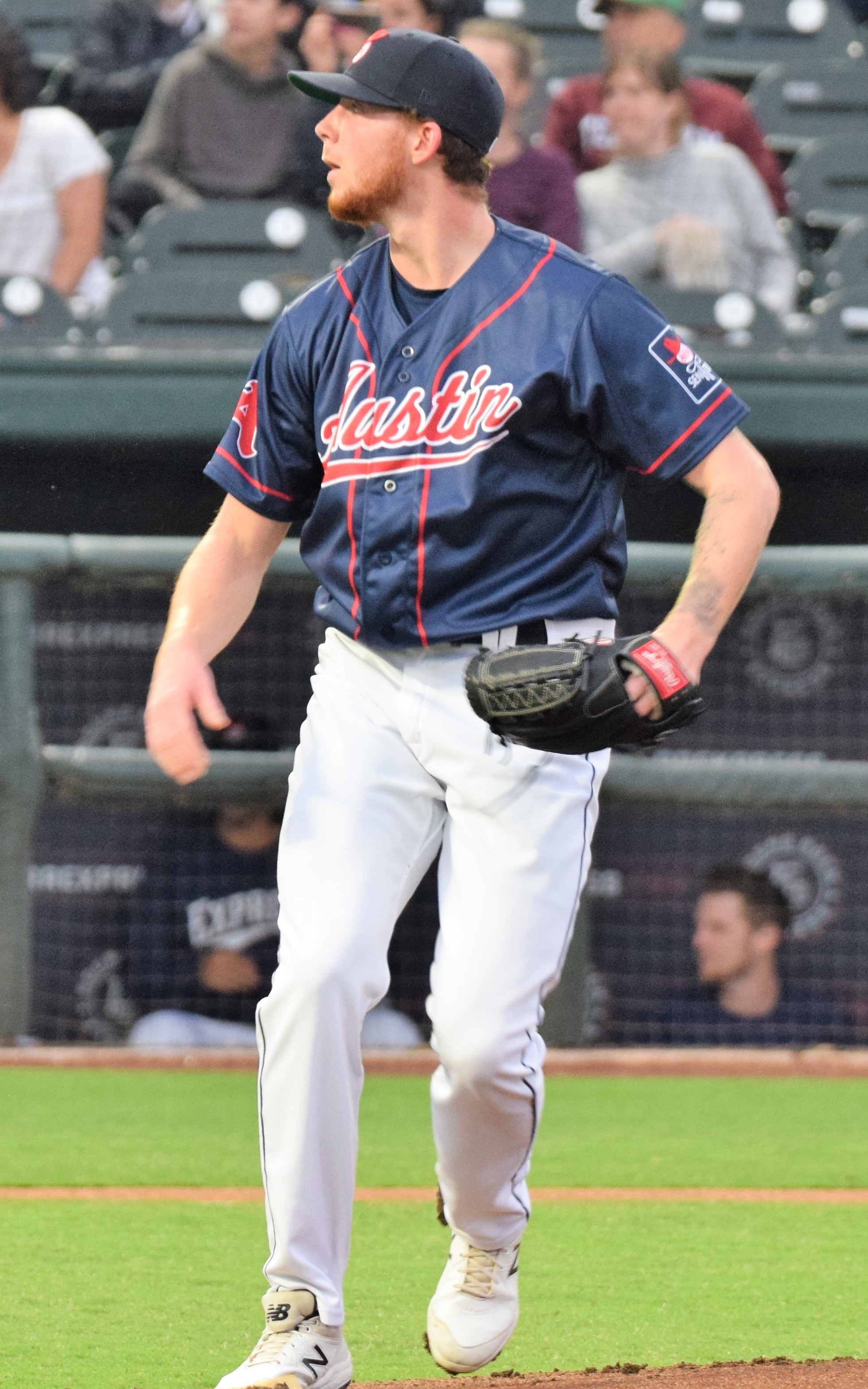
- Alexy with the Round Rock Express in 2022

Free agent
- Pitcher
- Born: April 21, 1998 (age 28); Honey Brook, Pennsylvania, U.S.
- Bats: Right Throws: Right

MLB debut
- August 30, 2021, for the Texas Rangers

MLB statistics (through 2022 season)
- Win–loss record: 4–2
- Earned run average: 6.30
- Strikeouts: 23
- Stats at Baseball Reference

Teams
- Texas Rangers (2021–2022)

Adam John Alexy (born April 21, 1998) is an American professional baseball pitcher who is a free agent. He has previously played in Major League Baseball (MLB) for the Texas Rangers.

== Amateur career ==
Alexy attended Twin Valley High School in Elverson, Pennsylvania. He committed to play college baseball at Radford University. During his senior season at Twin Valley, Alexy went 9 innings in which he threw 164 pitches, leading his team to a 2–1 win. Alexy was drafted by the Los Angeles Dodgers in the 11th round of the 2016 MLB draft, and signed with them for a $600,000 signing bonus, forgoing his commitment to Radford.

== Professional career ==
=== Los Angeles Dodgers ===
After signing, Alexy was assigned to the Arizona League Dodgers to make his professional debut; in 13 2/3 innings pitched for them, he posted a 1–0 record and a 4.61 ERA. He began the 2017 season with the Great Lakes Loons.

=== Texas Rangers ===
On July 31, 2017, the Dodgers traded Alexy, along with Willie Calhoun and Brendon Davis, to the Texas Rangers in exchange for Yu Darvish. The Rangers assigned him to the Hickory Crawdads, where he finished the season. In 19 starts for Great Lakes he was 2–6 with a 3.97 ERA, striking out 86 in 73 2/3 innings, and in five starts for Hickory he was 1–1 with a 3.05 ERA. He spent 2018 with Hickory, going 6–8 with a 3.58 ERA and 138 strikeouts over 108 innings. Alexy was assigned to the Down East Wood Ducks of the High–A Carolina League for the 2019 season, going 0–3 with a 5.12 ERA in 19 1/3 innings. He suffered a strained Latissimus dorsi muscle in his back during a game on May 1 and received a platelet rich plasma injection as part of his rehab process. Alexy missed the rest of the 2019 season due to the lat injury. Following the 2019 season, Alexy played for the Surprise Saguaros of the Arizona Fall League. Alexy did not play in a game in 2020 due to the cancellation of the Minor League Baseball season because of the COVID-19 pandemic.

On November 20, 2020, Alexy was added to the Rangers 40-man roster. Alexy opened the 2021 season with the Frisco RoughRiders of the Double-A Central league. After going 3–1 with a 1.61 ERA and 57 strikeouts over 50 1/3 innings for Frisco, he was promoted to the Round Rock Express of the Triple-A West on August 3.

On August 30, 2021, Alexy was promoted to the active roster to make his MLB debut that night versus the Colorado Rockies. In his debut, he recorded the win while throwing five scoreless innings with four strikeouts. Over five games for Texas in 2021, Alexy posted a 3–1 record with a 4.70 ERA and 17 strikeouts over 23 innings. With Round Rock in 2022, he went 6–6 with a 5.91 ERA over 96 innings. With Texas, he went 1–1 with a 11.57 ERA over 7 innings.

On December 9, 2022, Alexy was designated for assignment by the Rangers.

=== Chicago White Sox ===
On December 13, 2022, Alexy was claimed off waivers by the Washington Nationals. Alexy was designated for assignment on January 4, 2023, after the signing of Dominic Smith was made official.

On January 10, 2023, Alexy was traded to the Minnesota Twins in exchange for minor league right-hander Cristian Jimenez. On January 23, Alexy was designated for assignment by Minnesota following the acquisition of Michael A. Taylor.

On January 30, 2023, Alexy was claimed off waivers by the Chicago White Sox. Alexy was optioned to the Triple-A Charlotte Knights to begin the 2023 season. Alexy struggled to an ugly 15.30 ERA and 10:18 K:BB in 4 appearances with Charlotte. On April 28, Alexy was removed from the 40-man roster and sent outright to Triple-A. He was released on July 1, after remaining struggles left him at an 0–3 record and 12.00 ERA.

=== Southern Maryland Blue Crabs ===
On August 8, 2023, Alexy signed with the Southern Maryland Blue Crabs of the Atlantic League of Professional Baseball. In 6 appearances, he struggled to an 11.81 ERA with 8 strikeouts in 5 1/3 innings pitched. On August 15, Alexy was released by the Blue Crabs.

=== Minnesota Twins ===
On December 19, 2023, Alexy signed a minor league contract with the Minnesota Twins. He pitched to a 7.94 ERA with 16 strikeouts over 7 games for the Double-A Wichita Wind Surge. On May 18, 2024, the Twins organization released Alexy.

=== Kansas City Monarchs ===
On June 7, 2024, Alexy signed with the Kansas City Monarchs of the American Association of Professional Baseball. In 20 appearances for Kansas City, he worked to a 6.26 ERA with 29 strikeouts and 3 saves across 23 innings pitched. On August 7, Alexy was released by the Monarchs.

=== Lancaster Stormers ===
On August 13, 2024, Alexy signed with the Lancaster Stormers of the Atlantic League of Professional Baseball. In 14 appearances for Lancaster, he logged a 2–1 record and 2.57 ERA with 21 strikeouts across 14 innings of relief.

On March 5, 2025, Alexy re-signed with the Stormers. In 30 appearances for Lancaster, he struggled to an 0-2 record and 12.38 ERA with more walks (42) than strikeouts (36) over 40 innings of work. Alexy was released by the Stormers on August 29.

On March 14, 2026, Alexy re-signed with the Stormers for a third straight season. In 30 games he threw 29.1 innings of relief struggling mightily going 1-3 with a 13.50 ERA with more walks (49) than strikeouts (30). He was released on August 20.
