= Yohel Pozo =

Venezuelan baseball player (born 1997)

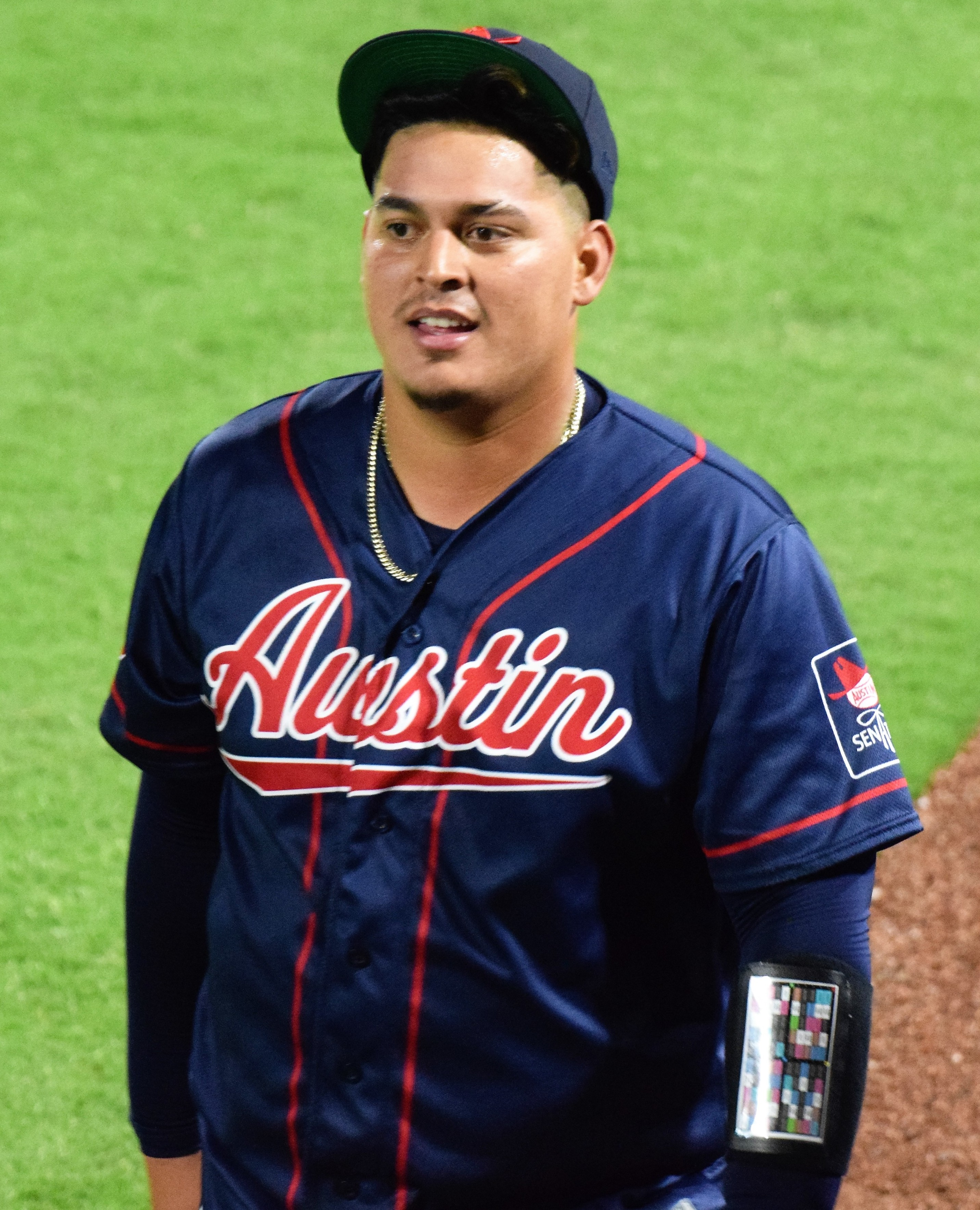
- Pozo with the Round Rock Express in 2022

Free agent
- Catcher
- Born: June 14, 1997 (age 29); Maracaibo, Venezuela
- Bats: Right Throws: Right

MLB debut
- August 13, 2021, for the Texas Rangers

MLB statistics (through 2026 season)
- Batting average: .248
- Home runs: 7
- Runs batted in: 35
- Stats at Baseball Reference

Teams
- Texas Rangers (2021); St. Louis Cardinals (2025–2026); Baltimore Orioles (2026)

Yohel Enrique Pozo (Spanish pronunciation: [ɟʝoˈel ˈpozo] jo-EL; born June 14, 1997) is a Venezuelan professional baseball catcher who is a free agent. He has previously played in Major League Baseball (MLB) for the Texas Rangers, St. Louis Cardinals and Baltimore Orioles.

== Career ==
=== Texas Rangers ===
Pozo signed as an international free agent with the Texas Rangers on August 17, 2013, for a $100,000 signing bonus. He spent the 2014 and 2015 seasons with the Dominican Summer League Rangers, hitting .273/.329/.333 with 29 RBI in 2014 and a similar .272/.335/.354 with one home run and 24 RBI in 2015. He spent the 2016 season with the Arizona League Rangers, hitting .343/.382/.448 with one home run and 22 RBI. Pozo split the 2017 season between the Spokane Indians of the Low-A Northwest League and the Hickory Crawdads of the Single-A South Atlantic League, hitting a combined .323/.351/.478 with four home runs and 25 RBI. Pozo spent the 2018 season back with Hickory, hitting .264/.312/.411 with 10 home runs and 49 RBI. He played the 2019 season with the Down East Wood Ducks of the High-A Carolina League, where he hit .246/.274/.357 with nine home runs and 43 RBI.

Pozo did not play in a game in 2020 due to the cancelation of the minor league season because of the COVID-19 pandemic. He became a free agent on November 2.

On November 17, 2020, Pozo signed a minor league contract with the San Diego Padres. However, on December 10, Pozo returned to the Rangers, when the team selected him in the minor league phase of the Rule 5 draft.

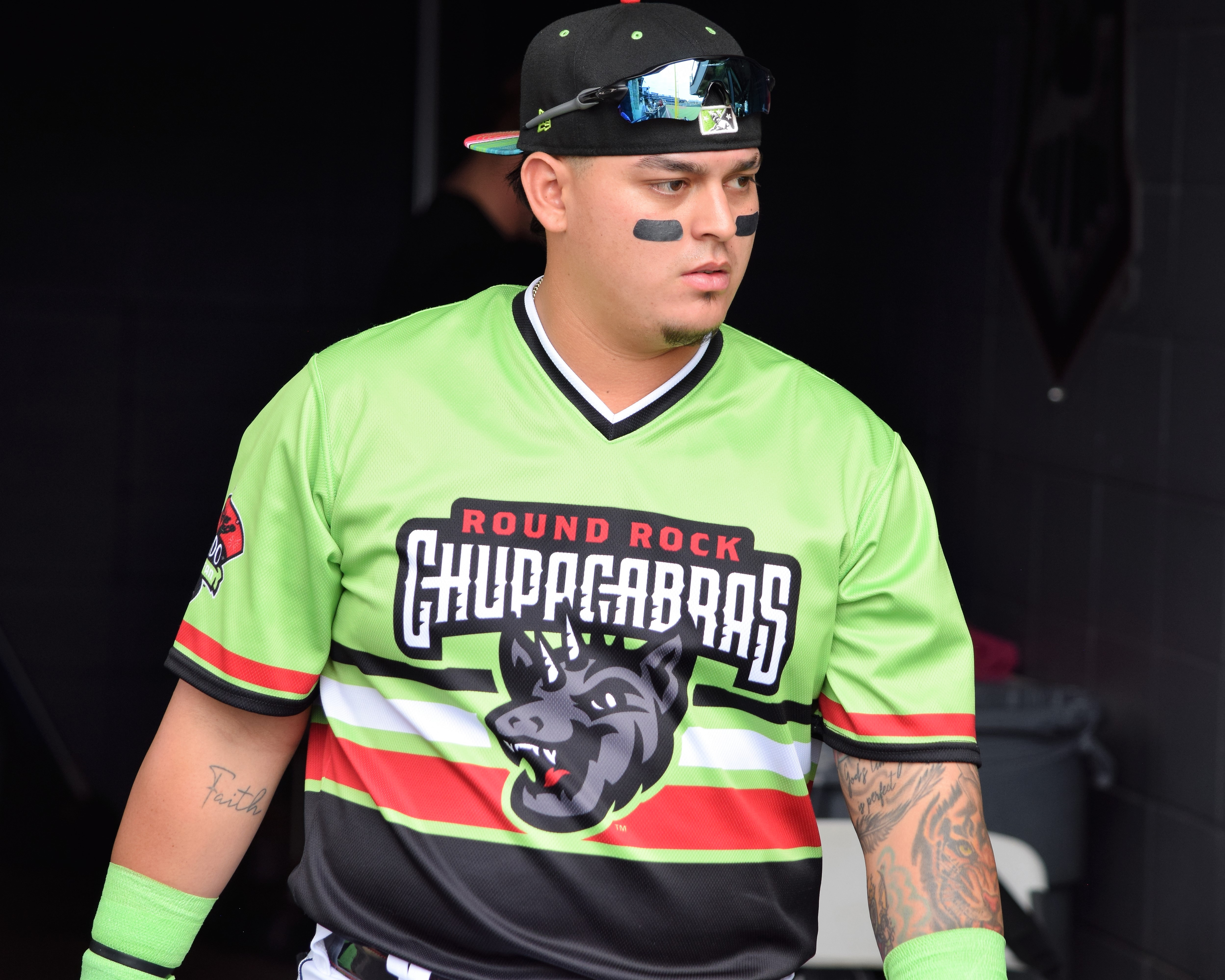
Pozo with Round Rock in 2022

Pozo started the 2021 season with the Round Rock Express of the Triple-A West, hitting .337/.352/.622 with 23 home runs and 74 RBI over 77 games during the season. On August 13, Texas selected his contract and promoted him to the active roster. That night, he made his major league debut, facing the Oakland Athletics. In his debut, Pozo recorded his first career hit off Cole Irvin and hit his first MLB home run off Sergio Romo. Over 21 games for Texas in 2021, Pozo hit .284/.312/.378 with one home run and nine RBI. On November 30, Pozo was non-tendered by the Rangers, making him a free agent. He re-signed with Texas on a minor league contract the next day.

Appearing in just 65 games for Round Rock in 2022, Pozo hit .320/.352/.474 with six home runs and 38 RBI. He elected free agency following the season on November 10.

=== Oakland Athletics ===
On December 13, 2022, Pozo signed a minor league contract with an invitation to spring training with the Oakland Athletics. In 92 games for the Triple-A Las Vegas Aviators in 2023, he slashed .306/.338/.523 with 18 home runs and 81 RBI. Pozo re-signed with Oakland on a minor league contract on November 11. He returned to Las Vegas in 2024, batting .324/.335/.538 with 15 home runs and 54 RBI. Pozo elected free agency following the season on November 4.

On November 13, 2024, Pozo signed a minor league contract with the Atlanta Braves. He was released by the organization two days later.

=== St. Louis Cardinals ===
On January 23, 2025, Pozo signed a minor league contract with the St. Louis Cardinals. Following an injury to Iván Herrera, Pozo was added to St. Louis' active roster on April 7. On June 21, he delivered his first career walk-off hit, an 11th inning RBI single against the Cincinnati Reds. On July 5, Pozo hit a pinch-hit three-run home run out of Wrigley Field to put the Cardinals ahead of the Chicago Cubs. The home run proved to be the decisive play, securing the win for St. Louis in the rivalry matchup. In 67 appearances for St. Louis, he batted .231/.262/.375 with five home runs and 19 RBI. On November 21, Pozo was non-tendered by the Cardinals and became a free agent.

On November 24, 2025, Pozo re-signed with St. Louis on a major league contract. He 18 appearances for the Cardinals in 2026, going 8-for-33 (.242) with five RBI. Pozo was designated for assignment by the team on July 17, 2026.

=== Baltimore Orioles ===
On July 23, 2026, Pozo was claimed off of waivers by the Baltimore Orioles. He made his debut with the Orioles on July 28. Pozo made 19 appearances for Baltimore, slashing .259/.276/.370 with one home run, two RBI, and one walk. On November 2, he was removed from the 40–man roster and sent outright to the Triple–A Norfolk Tides. He elected free agency on November 2.

== Personal life ==
Pozo's father, also named Yohel, played five seasons of minor league baseball in the Colorado Rockies organization. Pozo's grandfather taught him to hit a baseball. Pozo was childhood friends with Rougned Odor, who also grew up in Maracaibo and signed with the Rangers. Pozo played for the Maracaibo, Venezuela team in the 2009 Little League World Series.

After becoming a free agent in 2020, Pozo was living in a car with his wife and kids in a Walmart parking lot in Orlando, Florida, working in food delivery.

=== Legal troubles ===
In 2016, Pozo, Odor, and six other Rangers prospects were investigated by Dominican Republic police concerning an incident where video was uploaded to Snapchat purporting to show the sexual assault of a Rangers minor league player. The Rangers suspended Pozo and the other players while the investigation was pending, but police did not press charges against anyone. Pozo later said the incident was not sexual abuse and that he matured from the process.

== See also ==
- List of Major League Baseball players from Venezuela
- Rule 5 draft results
