= Nick Snyder =

American baseball player (born 1995)

Free agent
- Pitcher
- Born: October 10, 1995 (age 30); Palm City, Florida, U.S.
- Bats: Right Throws: Right

MLB debut
- August 21, 2021, for the Texas Rangers

MLB statistics (through 2022 season)
- Win–loss record: 0–0
- Earned run average: 7.71
- Strikeouts: 1
- Stats at Baseball Reference

Teams
- Texas Rangers (2021–2022)

Nicklaus Scott Snyder (born October 10, 1995) is an American professional baseball pitcher who is a free agent. He has previously played in Major League Baseball (MLB) for the Texas Rangers.

== Amateur career ==
Snyder attended South Fork High School in Stuart, Florida. Undrafted out of high school, Snyder attended Indian River State College in Fort Pierce, Florida. Snyder was an infielder throughout his college baseball career, and was named the Florida NJCAA Defensive Player of the year in 2017. Snyder was drafted by the Texas Rangers in the 19th round of the 2017 MLB draft, as a pitcher.

== Professional career ==
=== Texas Rangers ===
Snyder made his professional debut with the AZL Rangers of the Rookie-level Arizona League in 2017, posting a 1.29 ERA over 7 innings. He returned to the AZL in 2018, going 1–0 with a 6.00 ERA and 12 strikeouts over 12 innings. Snyder spent the 2019 season with the Hickory Crawdads of the Single–A South Atlantic League, posting a 5–3 record with a 3.06 ERA and 60 strikeouts over 53 innings. Following the 2019 season, he played for the Surprise Saguaros of the Arizona Fall League. Snyder underwent Tommy John surgery in February 2020, but did not miss game action that year due to the cancellation of the Minor League Baseball season because of the COVID-19 pandemic.

Snyder opened the 2021 season with the Hickory Crawdads of the High-A East league, posting a 2.17 ERA with 17 strikeouts over 12 1/3 innings, before being promoted to the Frisco RoughRiders of the Double-A Central league on June 17. After posting a 1.65 ERA with 25 strikeouts over 16 1/3 innings, Snyder was promoted to the Round Rock Express of the Triple-A West league. With Round Rock, he posted a 6.23 ERA over five appearances.

On August 20, 2021, Texas selected Snyder's contact to the active roster and promoted him to the major leagues for the first time. He made his major league debut on August 21 versus the Boston Red Sox; throwing a scoreless inning in relief and recording his first MLB strikeout (J. D. Martinez). Snyder made four appearances for Texas in 2021, before being shut down with right shoulder fatigue in September. Snyder was named the Rangers' 2021 minor league Reliever of the Year. He was non–tendered and became a free agent on November 18, 2022. He re-signed with Texas on December 9 on a minor league contract. Snyder did not pitch professionally in 2023 as the result of an injury. He elected free agency following the season on November 6, 2023.

=== Philadelphia Phillies ===
On December 4, 2023, Snyder signed a minor league contract with the Philadelphia Phillies. He did not appear for the organization and elected free agency following the season on November 4, 2024.

=== Gastonia Ghost Peppers ===
On April 11, 2025, Snyder signed with the Gastonia Ghost Peppers of the Atlantic League of Professional Baseball. In 27 appearances for Gastonia, Snyder posted an 0-2 record and 2.17 ERA with 30 strikeouts and six saves across 29 innings pitched.

=== Algodoneros de Unión Laguna ===
On July 10, 2025, Snyder signed with the Algodoneros de Unión Laguna of the Mexican League. In 12 relief appearances, he struggled to a 0–2 record with a 7.62 ERA, 11 strikeouts, and six walks across 13 innings pitched.

Snyder made 15 relief appearances for the Algodoneros in 2026, posting a 1–1 record with a 6.14 ERA, 12 strikeouts, and seven walks over 14 2/3 innings pitched. On May 21, 2026, Snyder was released by Laguna.
