= Spencer Patton =

American baseball player (born 1988)

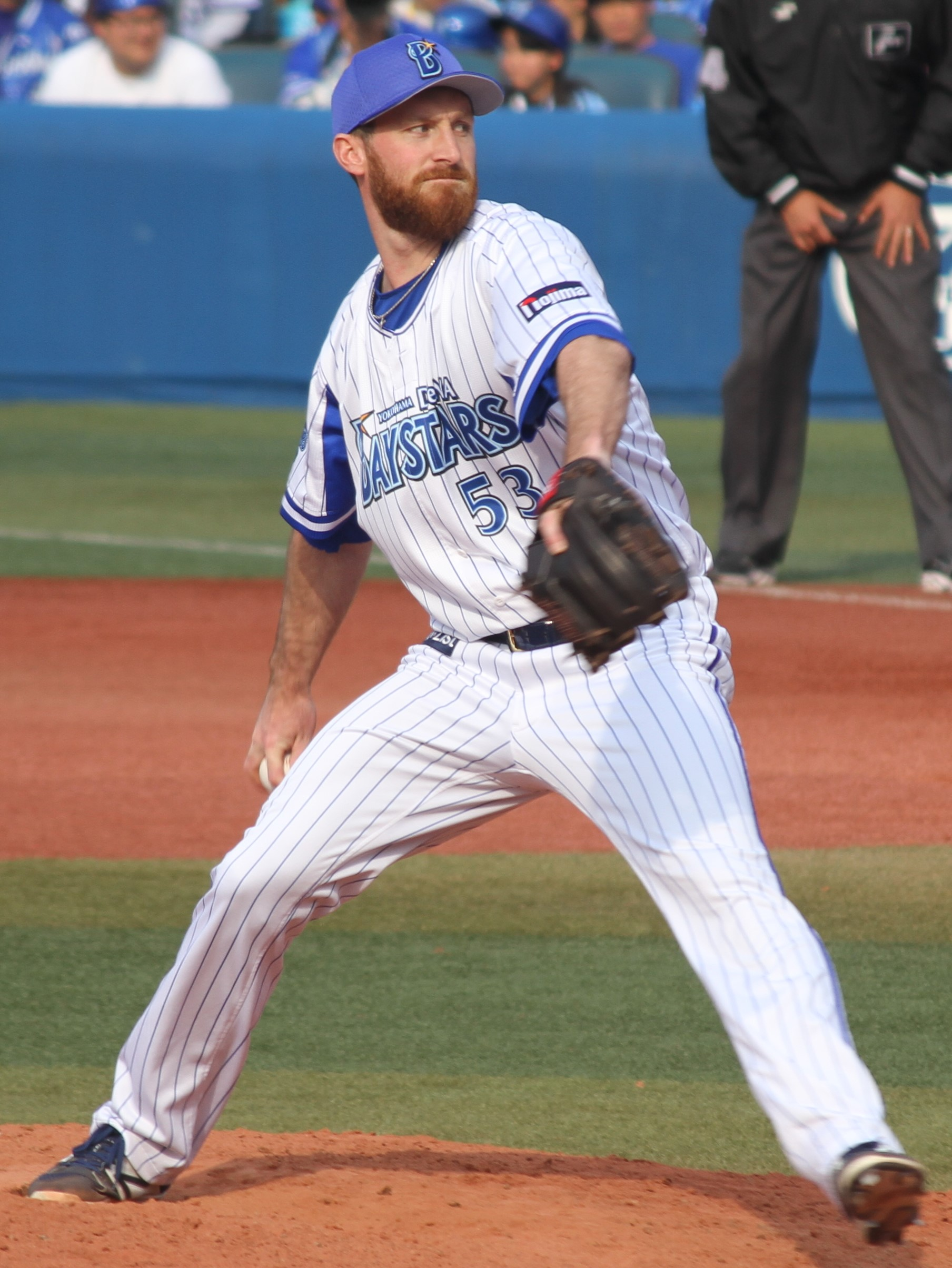
- Patton with the Yokohama DeNA BayStars
- Pitcher
- Born: February 20, 1988 (age 38); Urbana, Illinois, U.S.
- Batted: Right Threw: Right

Professional debut
- MLB: September 4, 2014, for the Texas Rangers
- NPB: April 1, 2017, for the Yokohama DeNA BayStars

Last appearance
- NPB: November 3, 2020, for the Yokohama DeNA BayStars
- MLB: September 5, 2023, for the Oakland Athletics

MLB statistics
- Win–loss record: 5–4
- Earned run average: 5.11
- Strikeouts: 118

NPB statistics
- Win–loss record: 12–9
- Earned run average: 3.68
- Strikeouts: 243
- Stats at Baseball Reference

Teams
- Texas Rangers (2014–2015); Chicago Cubs (2016); Yokohama DeNA BayStars (2017–2020); Texas Rangers (2021–2022); Oakland Athletics (2023)
Medals
Men's baseball
Representing United States
WBSC Premier12
Bronze medal – third place	2024 Tokyo	Team

Spencer Burdette Patton (born February 20, 1988) is an American former professional baseball pitcher. He played in Major League Baseball (MLB) for the Texas Rangers, Chicago Cubs, and Oakland Athletics, and in Nippon Professional Baseball (NPB) for the Yokohama DeNA BayStars.

== Amateur career ==
Patton attended South Central High School in Farina, Illinois where he played both basketball and baseball. In basketball, Patton was a third-team all state selection as a senior and in baseball was named all-area player of the year.

Patton attended Parkland College in Champaign, Illinois where he played baseball for one year. He then transferred to Southern Illinois University Edwardsville (SIUE). Following his senior season at SIUE, Patton was awarded the NCAA Division I Rawlings Gold Glove Award for 2011.

Patton was also named co-pitcher of the year while Pitching for Forest City, NC, of the Coastal Plain League in 2009, winning a CPL championship and being ranked as the #1 collegiate summer team in the country (according to Perfect Game) with a record of 51–9.

== Professional career ==
=== Kansas City Royals ===
Patton was drafted by the Kansas City Royals in the 24th round of the 2011 Major League Baseball draft out of Southern Illinois University Edwardsville. He made his professional debut with the rookie ball Idaho Falls Chukars, registering a 3–1 record and 3.40 ERA in 19 games. He returned to Idaho Falls the next year, appearing in 16 games but struggling to an 0–7 record and 6.32 ERA. He split the 2013 season between the High-A Wilmington Blue Rocks and the Double-A Northwest Arkansas Naturals, posting a stellar 5–2 record and 1.86 ERA with 103 strikeouts in 37 games between the two teams. He was assigned to the Triple-A Omaha Storm Chasers to begin the 2014 season, and pitched to a 4–3 record and 4.08 ERA in 34 games with them.

=== Texas Rangers ===
Patton was traded from the Royals to the Texas Rangers for Jason Frasor on July 16, 2014. On September 4, 2014, Patton was selected to the 40-man roster and promoted to the major leagues for the first time. He made his major league debut that day, recording two scoreless innings against the Seattle Mariners. Patton gave up 1 earned run in 9.1 innings pitched in 2014, marking a 0.94 ERA on the season. Patton made 27 appearances for the Rangers in 2015, and gave up 24 earned runs in 24.0 innings pitched to go along with a 9.00 ERA and 28 strikeouts.

=== Chicago Cubs ===
On November 20, 2015, the Rangers traded Patton to the Chicago Cubs for minor leaguer Frandy Delarosa. In 2016, Patton made 16 relief appearances for the Cubs and finished 1–1 with a 5.48 ERA. The Cubs finished the season 103–58 and eventually won the 2016 World Series. Patton did not participate in the playoffs, but was still on the 40-man roster at the time and won his first World Series title. On November 23, Patton was released from the 40-man roster so he could pursue an opportunity in Japan.

=== Yokohama DeNA BayStars ===
On November 23, 2016, Patton signed with the Yokohama DeNA BayStars of Nippon Professional Baseball (NPB). In 2017 with the BayStars, Patton logged a neat 4–3 record and 2.70 ERA with 66 strikeouts in 60.0 innings of work. The next year, he continued his success, posting a 5–1 record and 2.57 ERA with 67 strikeouts in 56.0 innings pitched.

On November 25, 2018, Patton signed a contract extension with the team worth $3 million with up to $1 million in incentives. In 2019, Patton was less productive, recording an 0–3 record and 5.15 ERA in 42 appearances. On November 18, 2019, Patton signed a one-year extension to remain with the BayStars. In 2020, Patton pitched to a 3–2 record and 4.92 ERA with 65 strikeouts in 57 appearances. On December 2, 2020, he became a free agent. In 4 seasons with the BayStars, Patton cumulatively pitched to a 12–9 record with a 3.68 ERA and 243 strikeouts.

=== Texas Rangers (second stint) ===
On February 2, 2021, Patton signed a minor league contract with the Texas Rangers organization and was invited to Spring Training. Patton was assigned to the Triple-A Round Rock Express, where he logged 12 scoreless innings before having his contract selected to the active roster on June 9, 2021. Over 42.1 innings for Texas in 2021, Patton posted a 2–2 record with a 3.83 ERA.

In 7 appearances for the Rangers in 2022, Patton registered a 3.86 ERA with 5 strikeouts in 7.0 innings pitched. Patton was designated for assignment on June 23, 2022. He cleared waivers and was sent outright to Triple-A Round Rock on June 25. He made 24 total appearances for the Express, posting a 4-2 record and 6.44 ERA with 40 strikeouts in 29.1 innings pitched. On August 16, the Rangers released Patton.

=== Oakland Athletics ===
On April 5, 2023, Patton signed a minor league contract with the Oakland Athletics organization. He made 6 appearances for the Triple-A Las Vegas Aviators, posting a 4.32 ERA with 10 strikeouts and 2 saves. On May 4, Patton had his contract selected to the active roster. In 4 games, Patton surrendered 4 runs on 5 hits and 1 walk with 1 strikeouts in 5.1 innings pitched. He was designated for assignment on May 13, when James Kaprielian was recalled from Triple-A. He cleared waivers and was sent outright to Triple-A on May 15. On August 21, Patton had his contract selected back to the major league roster. Patton was designated for assignment a second time on September 6. On September 8, he cleared waivers and was sent outright to Triple–A Las Vegas. On October 2, Patton elected free agency.

=== Olmecas de Tabasco ===
On February 28, 2024, Patton signed with the Olmecas de Tabasco of the Mexican League. In 42 appearances for Tabasco, he posted a 4–1 record and 2.29 ERA with 64 strikeouts across 39 1/3 innings pitched. Patton became a free agent following the season.

Patton played winter ball for the Leones del Escogido in the 2024-25 LIDOM season, winning the title championship with them.

On February 19, 2025, Patton announced his retirement from professional baseball via his X account.
