= Demarcus Evans =

American baseball player (born 1996)

Free agent
- Pitcher
- Born: October 22, 1996 (age 29); Petal, Mississippi, U.S.
- Bats: Right Throws: Right

MLB debut
- September 18, 2020, for the Texas Rangers

MLB statistics (through 2021 season)
- Win–loss record: 0–2
- Earned run average: 4.75
- Strikeouts: 37
- Stats at Baseball Reference

Teams
- Texas Rangers (2020–2021)

Demarcus Malik Evans (born October 22, 1996) is an American professional baseball pitcher who is currently a free agent. He has previously played in Major League Baseball (MLB) for the Texas Rangers.

== Amateur career ==
Evans attended Petal High School in Petal, Mississippi. Evans was drafted by the Texas Rangers in the 25th round of the 2015 MLB draft and signed with them for a $100,000 signing bonus, forgoing his college commitment to Hinds Community College.

== Professional career ==
=== Texas Rangers ===
After signing, Evans was assigned to the Arizona League Rangers of the Rookie-level Arizona League to make his professional debut; in 11 2/3 innings pitched for them, he posted a 0–0 record with a 2.31 ERA. He split the 2016 season between the AZL Rangers and the Spokane Indians of the Low–A Northwest League. In a combined 14 games (12 starts), he went 1–2 with a 2.95 ERA, striking out 75 in 55 innings. He split 2017 between the AZL Rangers, Spokane, and Hickory Crawdads of the Single–A South Atlantic League, going a combined 2–8 with a 4.53 ERA in 20 games (14 starts). He spent 2018 with Hickory, going 4–1 with a 1.77 ERA, while striking out 103 in 56.0 innings. He earned a spot on the South Atlantic League post-season all-star team. After the 2018 regular season, Evans played for the Surprise Saguaros of the Arizona Fall League. Evans was named the Texas Rangers 2018 Minor League Reliever of the Year.

Evans was assigned to the Down East Wood Ducks of the High–A Carolina League to open the 2019 season. He went 4–0 with a 0.81 ERA and 40 strikeouts in 22 1/3 innings for them. On May 29, he was promoted to the Frisco RoughRiders of the Double-A Texas League. With Frisco, Evans went 2–0 with a 0.96 ERA and 60 strikeouts over 37 2/3 innings. Evans was named the 2019 MiLB Relief Pitcher of the Year by Baseball America. Evans was named the Texas Rangers 2019 Minor League Reliever of the Year. Following the 2019 season, Evans played for Leones del Escogido of the Dominican Winter League. On November 20, 2019, the Rangers added Evans to their 40–man roster to protect him from the Rule 5 draft.

On September 15, 2020, Evans was promoted to the major leagues for the first time. He made his debut on September 18 against the Los Angeles Angels, surrendering Albert Pujols' career home run number 662. In four appearances for Texas in 2020, Evans recorded a 2.25 ERA with 4 strikeouts over 4 innings. Evans split the 2021 season between Texas and the Round Rock Express of the Triple-A West. With Texas he went 0–2 with a 5.13 ERA and 33 strikeouts over 26 1/3 innings, and with Round Rock he posted a 2–0 record with a 3.74 ERA and 31 strikeouts over 21 2/3 innings.

He was designated for assignment on June 26, 2022. Evans cleared waivers and was sent outright to Triple-A Round Rock on July 1. He spent the 2022 season back with Round Rock, going 2–3 with a 3.82 ERA over 33 innings. He elected free agency following the season on November 10.

=== New York Yankees ===
On December 8, 2022, Evans signed a minor league contract with the New York Yankees. He did not play in a game for the organization and elected free agency following the season on November 6, 2023.

=== Charleston Dirty Birds ===
On February 22, 2024, Evans signed with the Leones de Yucatán of the Mexican League. However, he did not make an appearance for Yucátan, and signed with the Charleston Dirty Birds of the Atlantic League of Professional Baseball on May 9. In four games for the Dirty Birds, Evans struggled to a 12.46 ERA with three strikeouts across 4 1/3 innings. On May 21, Evans was released by Charleston.

=== Cleburne Railroaders ===
On April 14, 2025, Evans signed with the Cleburne Railroaders of the American Association of Professional Baseball. He made one appearance for the team, allowing four runs on three hits across 2/3 of an inning. Evans was released by Cleburne on June 3.

=== Gary SouthShore RailCats ===
On June 10, 2025, Evans signed with the Gary SouthShore RailCats of the American Association of Professional Baseball. In 27 games (1 start) he threw 33.2 innings going 2-3 with a 3.48 ERA and 27 strikeouts. He became a free agent following the season.

== Personal life ==
Evans and professional baseball outfielder Anthony Alford are cousins.
