= Kolby Allard =

American baseball player (born 1997)

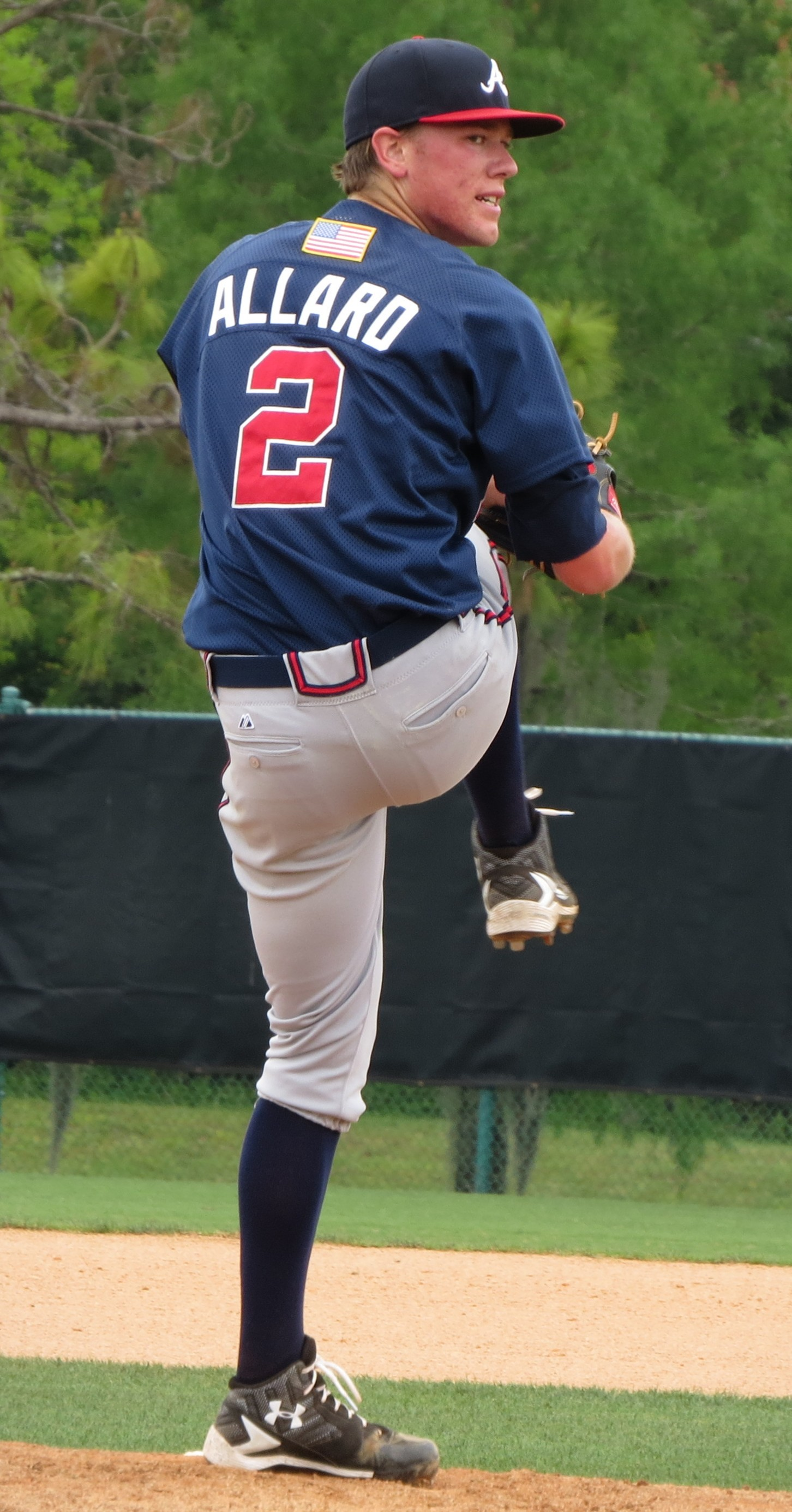
- Allard pitching for the Atlanta Braves organization in 2016

Free agent
- Pitcher
- Born: August 13, 1997 (age 29); Anaheim, California, U.S.
- Bats: Left Throws: Left

MLB debut
- July 31, 2018, for the Atlanta Braves

MLB statistics (through 2026 season)
- Win–loss record: 13–26
- Earned run average: 5.47
- Strikeouts: 278
- Stats at Baseball Reference

Teams
- Atlanta Braves (2018); Texas Rangers (2019–2022); Atlanta Braves (2023); Philadelphia Phillies (2024); Cleveland Guardians (2025–2026)

Kolby Kenneth Allard (born August 13, 1997) is an American professional baseball pitcher who is a free agent. He has previously played in Major League Baseball (MLB) for the Atlanta Braves, Texas Rangers, and Cleveland Guardians. He was selected by the Braves with the 14th overall pick in the first round of the 2015 MLB draft.

== Early life and amateur career ==
Kolby Allard was born in Anaheim, California on August 13, 1997, to parents Kenny and Kristi. He has a younger brother. Allard began playing baseball at the age of five, and focused on pitching at age ten.

Allard attended San Clemente High School in San Clemente, California. As a junior, he had a 1.32 earned run average (ERA) with 98 strikeouts in 62 2/3 innings pitched. After the season, he played in the Perfect Game All-American Classic, where he was named MVP after striking out the side in the inning he pitched. Later in the summer he played for the USA Baseball 18U National Team. Allard's senior season ended prematurely after he suffered a stress fracture in his back. Prior to the injury, Allard was projected to be a top 10 pick in the 2015 Major League Baseball draft. He committed to play college baseball for the UCLA Bruins.

== Professional career ==
=== Atlanta Braves ===
The Atlanta Braves selected Allard with the 14th pick in the first round of the 2015 Major League Baseball draft. His high school batterymate, Lucas Herbert, was also drafted by the Braves, 54th overall. Allard signed with the Braves on July 9 for $3 million.

Allard began pitching for the Gulf Coast League Braves in August 2015. After three scoreless appearances, he was shut down for back surgery which was described as a "minor back procedure." The Braves sent Allard to extended spring training to start the 2016 season. Allard spent 2016 with both the Rome Braves and the Danville Braves. In 2017, he pitched for the Mississippi Braves. The next year Allard was invited to spring training and ultimately began the season with the Gwinnett Stripers. Allard pitched 109 1/3 innings for the Stripers, recording a 2.80 ERA, 87 strikeouts and 33 walks. He was promoted to the major leagues for the first time on July 30, 2018. Allard made his major league debut the next day, pitching five innings against the Miami Marlins, yielding four earned runs on five hits, as well as two walks and one strikeout. Age 20 at the time of his first appearance, Allard became the youngest left-handed pitcher since Charlie Vaughan in 1966 to record a win in his debut. Allard opened the 2019 season with Gwinnett, going 7–5 with a 4.17 ERA over 110 innings.

=== Texas Rangers ===
On July 30, 2019, Allard was traded to the Texas Rangers in exchange for Chris Martin. He was then optioned to the Triple-A Nashville Sounds. After one start for Nashville, Allard was promoted to the Rangers. In 9 starts for Texas, Allard went 4–2 with a 4.96 ERA, 52 hits, and 33 strikeouts over 45 1/3 innings.

He struggled greatly in 2020 for Texas, when he went 0–6 with a 7.75 ERA with 20 walks over 33 2/3 innings; his six losses were second-most in the American League. In 2021 for Texas, Allard posted a 3–12 record with a 5.41 ERA and 104 strikeouts over 124 2/3 innings. His 12 losses were fifth-most in the American League, and the 29 home runs he gave up were 7th-most in the AL. Among AL pitchers with 120+ innings pitched, he had the league's 5th-highest ERA (5.41); he also had MLB’s 3rd-highest home runs per nine innings pitched rate, at 2.09.

In 2022 for Texas he was 1–2 with a 7.29 ERA. He gave up nine home runs in 21 innings.

=== Atlanta Braves (second stint) ===
On November 9, 2022, Allard was traded to the Atlanta Braves in exchange for Jake Odorizzi and cash considerations. Allard suffered a Grade 2 right oblique strain in spring training and was placed on the 60-day injured list to begin the season. On June 18, 2023, he began a rehab assignment with the Triple–A Gwinnett Stripers. Allard was activated from the injured list on June 28 and slotted as the starting pitcher in the team's game against the Minnesota Twins, where he contributed to a win for the Braves by pitching 4 2/3 innings with three hits and one walk allowed along with eight strikeouts thrown. On July 18, 2023, Allard was placed back on the 60-day injured list with left shoulder nerve inflammation. For the 2023 season, with Atlanta he was 0-1 with a 6.57 ERA in 12.1 innings in which he gave up 16 hits. He was non-tendered and became a free agent on November 17.

=== Philadelphia Phillies ===
On January 23, 2024, Allard signed a one-year, $1 million contract with the Philadelphia Phillies. He was optioned to the Triple–A Lehigh Valley IronPigs to begin the 2024 season. The Phillies promoted him to the major leagues on July 28.

Allard made 23 appearances (17 starts) in the minor leagues in 2024, compiling a 3–9 record and 5.66 ERA with 84 strikeouts across 90 2/3 innings pitched for the Double–A Reading Fightin Phils and Triple–A Lehigh Valley. In 7 games (4 starts) for the Phillies, he recorded a 5.00 ERA with 23 strikeouts over 27 innings of work. On November 4, Allard was removed from the 40–man roster and sent outright to Lehigh Valley, but he rejected the assignment and elected free agency.

=== Cleveland Guardians ===
On February 3, 2025, Allard signed a minor league contract with the Cleveland Guardians that included an invitation to spring training. He began the year with the Triple-A Columbus Clippers, recording a 4.86 ERA with 13 strikeouts over his first four starts. On April 26, the Guardians selected Allard's contract, adding him to their active roster. On July 3, Allard was designated for assignment by the Guardians. He elected free agency after clearing waivers on July 8. The next day, Cleveland re-signed Allard to a minor league contract and selected him to the active roster. In 33 appearances for the Guardians, he posted a 2-2 record and 2.63 ERA with 42 strikeouts over 65 innings of work. On November 6, Allard was removed from the 40-man roster and sent outright to Columbus; he subsequently rejected the assignment and elected free agency.

On February 2, 2026, Allard re-signed with the Guardians organization on a minor league contract. On March 30, Cleveland selected Allard's contract, adding him to their active roster. In four appearances for the Guardians, he struggled to a 10.38 ERA with nine strikeouts across 8 2/3 innings pitched. On April 13, Allard was designated for assignment by Cleveland. He cleared waivers and elected free agency on April 16. Allard re-signed with the Guardians on a new minor league contract the next day. He was released by Cleveland on May 17, but re-signed with the organization on another minor league contract two days later. Allard opted out his contract and was released by Cleveland for a second time on June 15.

=== Philadelphia Phillies (second stint) ===
On June 18, 2026, Allard signed a minor league contract with the Philadelphia Phillies. In 7 starts with Triple-A Lehigh Valley IronPigs he threw 36 innings going 1-3 with a 6.75 ERA and 30 strikeouts. He elected free agency on November 2.
