= 2020 Seattle Mariners season =

2020 Seattle Mariners
- League: American League
- Division: West
- Ballpark: T-Mobile Park
- City: Seattle, Washington
- Record: 27–33 (.450)
- Divisional place: 3rd
- Owners: Baseball Club of Seattle, LP, represented by CEO John Stanton
- Manager: Scott Servais
- Television: Root Sports Northwest (Dave Sims, Aaron Goldsmith, Mike Blowers)
- Radio: ESPN-710; Seattle Mariners Radio Network (Rick Rizzs, Aaron Goldsmith, Dave Sims)

The 2020 Seattle Mariners season was the 44th season in franchise history. The Mariners played their 21st full season (22nd overall) at T-Mobile Park, their home ballpark. The Mariners extended the longest active playoff drought in the four major North American professional sports leagues, having not made the postseason since 2001. They also entered this season as the only team not to win a league pennant.

On March 12, 2020, MLB announced that because of the ongoing COVID-19 pandemic, the start of the regular season would be delayed by at least two weeks in addition to the remainder of spring training being cancelled. Four days later, it was announced that the start of the season would be pushed back indefinitely due to the recommendation made by the CDC to restrict events of more than 50 people for eight weeks. On June 23, commissioner Rob Manfred unilaterally implemented a 60-game season. Players reported to training camps on July 1 in order to resume spring training and prepare for a July 24 Opening Day. The 2020 MLB season saw the adoption of many temporary rules, including universal DH, 7-inning scheduled doubleheaders, and extra innings starting with a runner on second base. All affiliated minor league seasons were canceled, leaving top prospects and depth players at the team's alternate training site in Tacoma, Washington, on an expanded roster.

The Mariners, led by their Black players, postponed a game against the San Diego Padres in late August following the shooting of Jacob Blake in Wisconsin. A three-game series against the Oakland Athletics at the start of September was postponed due to positive COVID-19 testing by the Athletics. A September 15 game against the San Francisco Giants in Seattle was postponed due to poor air quality caused by wild fires.

The Mariners finished the season 27–33, in third place in the American League (AL) West and five games out of a Wild Card spot. Center fielder Kyle Lewis won the AL Rookie of the Year Award, the fourth player in franchise history to win the award. Shortstop J. P. Crawford and first baseman Evan White won Gold Glove Awards. Marco Gonzales led Seattle pitchers in wins and innings pitched, led the AL in walks per nine innings pitched, and led MLB in strikeout-to-walk ratio.

== Standings ==
=== American League West ===
AL West
Team	W	L	Pct.	GB	Home	Road
Oakland Athletics	36	24	.600	—	22‍–‍10	14‍–‍14
Houston Astros	29	31	.483	7	20‍–‍9	9‍–‍22
Seattle Mariners	27	33	.450	9	14‍–‍10	13‍–‍23
Los Angeles Angels	26	34	.433	10	16‍–‍15	10‍–‍19
Texas Rangers	22	38	.367	14	16‍–‍14	6‍–‍24

=== American League Wild Card ===
Division leaders
Team	W	L	Pct.
Tampa Bay Rays	40	20	.667
Oakland Athletics	36	24	.600
Minnesota Twins	36	24	.600

Division 2nd place
Team	W	L	Pct.
Cleveland Indians	35	25	.583
New York Yankees	33	27	.550
Houston Astros	29	31	.483

Wild Card teams (Top 2 teams qualify for postseason)
Team	W	L	Pct.	GB
Chicago White Sox	35	25	.583	+3
Toronto Blue Jays	32	28	.533	—
Seattle Mariners	27	33	.450	5
Los Angeles Angels	26	34	.433	6
Kansas City Royals	26	34	.433	6
Baltimore Orioles	25	35	.417	7
Boston Red Sox	24	36	.400	8
Detroit Tigers	23	35	.397	8
Texas Rangers	22	38	.367	10

=== Record against opponents ===
2020 American League record Source: MLB Standings Grid – 2020
Team	HOU	LAA	OAK	SEA	TEX	NL
Houston	—	4–6	3–7	7–3	5–5	10–10
Los Angeles	6–4	—	4–6	5–5	4–6	7–13
Oakland	7–3	6–4	—	6–4	7–3	10–10
Seattle	3–7	5–5	4–6	—	8–2	7–13
Texas	5–5	6–4	3–7	2–8	—	6–14

== Game log ==
=== Regular season ===
2020 game log: 27–33 (Home: 16–14; Away: 11–19)
July: 4–4 (Home: 1–0; Away: 3–4)

#	Date	Opponent	Score	Win	Loss	Save	Record	Streak
1	July 24	@ Astros	2–8	Verlander (1–0)	**Gonzales** (0–1)	—	0–1	L1
2	July 25	@ Astros	2–7	McCullers Jr. (1–0)	**Walker** (0–1)	—	0–2	L2
3	July 26	@ Astros	7–6	**Altavilla** (1–0)	Devenski (0–1)	**Williams** (1)	1–2	W1
4	July 27	@ Astros	5–8	Bielak (1–0)	**Graveman** (0–1)	Osuna (1)	1–3	L1
5	July 28	@ Angels	2–10	Buchter (1–0)	**Sheffield** (0–1)	—	1–4	L2
6	July 29	@ Angels	10–7	**Shaw** (1–0)	Barnes (0–1)	**Altavilla** (1)	2–4	W1
7	July 30	@ Angels	8–5	**Gonzales** (1–1)	Bundy (1–1)	—	3–4	W2
8	July 31	Athletics	5–3	**Walker** (1–1)	Manaea (0–2)	**Williams** (2)	4–4	W3

August: 11–18 (Home: 6–8; Away: 5–10)

#	Date	Opponent	Score	Win	Loss	Save	Record	Streak
9	August 1	Athletics	2–3 (10)	Soria (1–0)	**Altavilla** (1–1)	Hendriks (2)	4–5	L1
10	August 2	Athletics	2–3	Bassitt (1–0)	**Graveman** (0–2)	Hendriks (3)	4–6	L2
11	August 3	Athletics	1–11	Montas (1–1)	**Sheffield** (0–2)	—	4–7	L3
12	August 4	Angels	3–5	Heaney (1–0)	**Dunn** (0–1)	Buttrey (1)	4–8	L4
13	August 5	Angels	7–6	**Gonzales** (2–1)	Teherán (0–1)	**Edwards Jr.** (1)	5–8	W1
14	August 6	Angels	1–6	Bundy (2–1)	**Walker** (1–2)	—	5–9	L1
15	August 7	Rockies	4–8	Senzatela (3–0)	**Kikuchi** (0–1)	—	5–10	L2
16	August 8	Rockies	0–5	Hoffman (2–0)	**Misiewicz** (0–1)	—	5–11	L3
17	August 9	Rockies	5–3	**Sheffield** (1–2)	Márquez (2–2)	**Williams** (3)	6–11	W1
18	August 10	@ Rangers	10–2	**Dunn** (1–1)	Gibson (0–2)	—	7–11	W2
19	August 11	@ Rangers	2–4	Vólquez (2–1)	**Gonzales** (2–2)	Montero (3)	7–12	L1
20	August 12	@ Rangers	4–7	Hernández (3–0)	**Swanson** (0–1)	Montero (4)	7–13	L2
21	August 14	@ Astros	1–11	Valdez (1–2)	**Cortes Jr.** (0–1)	—	7–14	L3
22	August 15	@ Astros	1–2	Javier (2–1)	**Margevicius** (0–1)	Pressly (2)	7–15	L4
23	August 16	@ Astros	2–3	Pressly (1–1)	**Swanson** (0–2)	—	7–16	L5
24	August 17	@ Dodgers	9–11	Ferguson (1–0)	**Magill** (0–1)	Jansen (7)	7–17	L6
25	August 18	@ Dodgers	1–2	Treinen (2–1)	**Altavilla** (1–2)	—	7–18	L7
26	August 19	Dodgers	6–4	**Walker** (2–2)	Santana (1–1)	**Williams** (4)	8–18	W1
27	August 20	Dodgers	1–6	Kershaw (3–1)	**Kikuchi** (0–2)	—	8–19	L1
28	August 21	Rangers	7–4	**Margevicius** (1–1)	Allard (0–2)	**Williams** (5)	9–19	W1
29	August 22	Rangers	10–1	**Sheffield** (2–2)	Lyles (1–3)	—	10–19	W2
30	August 23	Rangers	4–1	**Dunn** (2–1)	Minor (0–5)	**Williams** (6)	11–19	W3
31	August 25	@ Padres	8–3	**Gonzales** (3–2)	Paddack (2–3)	—	12–19	W4
—	August 26	@ Padres	Postponed (strikes due to shooting of Jacob Blake); Makeup: August 27					
32	August 27	@ Padres (1)	7–10 (7)	Johnson (3–1)	**Williams** (0–1)	—	12–20	L1
33	August 27	@ Padres (2)	8–3 (7)	**Kikuchi** (1–2)	Richards (1–2)	—	13–20	W1
34	August 28	@ Angels	2–3	Heaney (2–2)	**Margevicius** (1–2)	Buttrey (4)	13–21	L1
35	August 29	@ Angels	3–16	Bundy (4–2)	**Sheffield** (2–3)	—	13–22	L2
36	August 30	@ Angels	2–1 (10)	**Williams** (1–1)	Quijada (0–1)	**Ramírez** (1)	14–22	W1
37	August 31	@ Angels	2–1	**Gonzales** (4–2)	Andriese (1–2)	—	15–22	W2

September: 12–11 (Home: 9–6; Away: 3–5)

#	Date	Opponent	Score	Win	Loss	Save	Record	Streak
—	September 1	Athletics	Postponed (COVID-19); Makeup: September 14					
—	September 2	Athletics	Postponed (COVID-19); Makeup: September 14					
—	September 3	Athletics	Postponed (COVID-19); Makeup: September 26					
38	September 4	Rangers	6–3	**Kikuchi** (2–2)	Cody (0–1)	—	16–22	W3
39	September 5	Rangers	5–3	**Gerber** (1–0)	Hernández (5–1)	**Ramírez** (2)	17–22	W4
40	September 6	Rangers	4–3	**Dunn** (3–1)	Lyles (1–4)	**Hirano** (1)	18–22	W5
41	September 7	Rangers	8–4	**Gonzales** (5–2)	Allard (0–5)	**Ramírez** (3)	19–22	W6
42	September 8	@ Giants	5–6	Rogers (2–3)	**Misiewicz** (0–2)	Watson (2)	19–23	L1
43	September 9	@ Giants	1–10	Anderson (2–3)	**Margevicius** (1–3)	—	19–24	L2
44	September 11	@ Diamondbacks	3–4	Young (2–3)	**Kikuchi** (2–3)	Crichton (1)	19–25	L3
45	September 12	@ Diamondbacks	7–3	**Sheffield** (3–3)	Gallen (1–2)	—	20–25	W1
46	September 13	@ Diamondbacks	7–3	**Sadler** (1–0)	Weaver (1–7)	—	21–25	W2
47	September 14 (1)	Athletics	6–5 (7)	**Gonzales** (6–2)	Soria (2–2)	**Hirano** (2)	22–25	W3
48	September 14 (2)	Athletics	0–9 (7)	Minor (1–5)	**Yacabonis** (0–1)	—	22–26	L1
—	September 15	Giants	Postponed (Bad Air Quality); Makeup: September 17					
49	September 16	Giants	3–9	Cahill (1–1)	**Newsome** (0–1)	—	22–27	L2
50	September 17	Giants	4–6	Garcia (1–1)	**Graveman** (0–3)	Selman (1)	22–28	L3
51	September 18	Padres	1–6	Paddack (4–4)	**Kikuchi** (2–4)	—	22–29	L4
52	September 19	Padres	4–1	**Sheffield** (4–3)	Altavilla (1–3)	**Hirano** (3)	23–29	W1
53	September 20	Padres	4–7 (11)	Rosenthal (1–0)	**Sadler** (1–1)	—	23–30	L1
54	September 21	Astros	6–1	**Gonzales** (7–2)	McCullers Jr. (3–3)	—	24–30	W1
55	September 22	Astros	1–6	Valdez (5–3)	**Sadler** (1–2)	—	24–31	L1
56	September 23	Astros	3–2	**Margevicius** (2–3)	Greinke (3–3)	**Hirano** (4)	25–31	W1
57	September 25	@ Athletics	1–3 (10)	Diekman (2–0)	**Gerber** (1–1)	—	25–32	L1
58	September 26 (1)	@ Athletics	5–1 (8)	**Graveman** (1–3)	Hendriks (3–1)	—	26–32	W1
59	September 26 (2)	Athletics	12–3 (7)	**Dunn** (4–1)	Blackburn (0–1)	—	27–32	W2
60	September 27	@ Athletics	2–6	Petit (2–1)	**Hirano** (0–1)	—	27–33	L1

Legend: = Win = Loss = Postponement
Bold = Mariners team member

== Roster ==
2020 Seattle Mariners
Roster
Pitchers: 53 Dan Altavilla; 65 Brandon Brennan; 30 Nestor Cortes Jr.; 35 Justin Dunn; 16 Carl Edwards Jr.; 81 Aaron Fletcher; 60 Seth Frankoff; 59 Joey Gerber; 7 Marco Gonzales; 49 Kendall Graveman; 37 Zac Grotz; 45 Taylor Guilbeau; 6 Yoshihisa Hirano; 18 Yusei Kikuchi; 62 Brady Lail; 73 Walker Lockett; 61 Matt Magill; 52 Nick Margevicius; 38 Anthony Misiewicz; 74 Ljay Newsome; 55 Yohan Ramírez; 37 Casey Sadler; 36 Bryan Shaw; 33 Justus Sheffield; 50 Erik Swanson; 99 Taijuan Walker; 47 Taylor Williams; 47 Jimmy Yacabonis	Catchers: 57 Joe Hudson; 23 Austin Nola; 54 Joseph Odom; 22 Luis Torrens; Infielders: 3 J. P. Crawford; 23 Ty France; 9 Dee Strange-Gordon; 4 Shed Long; 15 Kyle Seager; 31 Donovan Walton; 12 Evan White	Outfielders: 5 Braden Bishop; 20 Phil Ervin; 8 Jake Fraley; 28 Sam Haggerty; 1 Kyle Lewis; 10 Tim Lopes; 26 José Marmolejos; 25 Dylan Moore; 0 Mallex Smith; Other Batters: 20 Dan Vogelbach	Manager: 29 Scott Servais; Coaches: 14 Manny Acta (third base); 66 Fleming Baez (bullpen catcher); 44 Jarret DeHart (assistant hitting); 40 Brian DeLunas (bullpen); 13 Perry Hill (first base); 21 Tim Laker (hitting); 48 Jared Sandberg (bench); 39 Carson Vitale (field coordinator); 32 Pete Woodworth (pitching)

== Statistics ==
=== Batting ===
Note: G = Games played; AB = At bats; R = Runs; H = Hits; 2B = Doubles; 3B = Triples; HR = Home runs; RBI = Runs batted in; SB = Stolen bases; BB = Walks; K = Strikeouts; AVG = Batting average; OBP = On base percentage; SLG = Slugging percentage;

Player	G	AB	R	H	2B	3B	HR	RBI	SB	BB	K	AVG	OBP	SLG	TB
Austin Nola	29	98	15	30	5	1	5	19	0	9	17	.306	.373	.531	52
Evan White	54	182	15	32	7	0	8	26	1	18	84	.176	.252	.346	63
Shed Long	34	117	10	20	5	0	3	9	4	11	37	.171	.242	.291	34
J. P. Crawford	53	204	33	52	7	2	2	24	6	23	39	.255	.336	.338	69
Kyle Seager	60	203	35	49	12	0	9	40	5	32	33	.241	.355	.433	88
José Marmolejos	35	107	12	22	4	0	6	18	0	7	32	.206	.261	.411	44
Kyle Lewis	58	206	37	54	3	0	11	28	5	34	71	.262	.364	.437	90
Phil Ervin	18	39	5	8	3	0	0	4	0	8	14	.205	.340	.282	11
Tim Lopes	46	143	16	34	12	0	2	15	5	6	34	.238	.278	.364	52
Dylan Moore	38	137	26	35	9	0	8	17	12	14	43	.255	.358	.496	68
Ty France	23	86	10	26	5	1	2	13	0	6	22	.302	.362	.453	39
Dee Strange-Gordon	33	75	12	15	1	0	0	3	3	5	13	.200	.268	.213	16
Luis Torrens	18	59	5	15	4	0	1	6	0	6	13	.254	.323	.373	22
Daniel Vogelbach	18	53	3	5	1	0	2	4	0	11	13	.094	.250	.226	12
Sam Haggerty	13	50	7	13	4	0	1	6	4	4	16	.260	.315	.400	20
Mallex Smith	14	45	2	6	2	0	0	3	2	2	13	.133	.170	.178	8
Joseph Odom	18	39	2	5	0	0	0	2	0	4	20	.128	.209	.128	5
Braden Bishop	12	30	2	5	2	0	0	4	1	2	10	.167	.242	.233	7
Jake Fraley	7	26	3	4	1	1	0	0	2	2	11	.154	.241	.269	7
Joe Hudson	9	17	0	3	0	0	0	0	0	2	5	.176	.263	.176	3
Donovan Walton	5	13	0	2	1	0	0	3	0	1	5	.154	.214	.231	3
Team totals	60	1929	254	435	88	5	60	244	50	207	545	.226	.309	.370	713

=== Pitching ===
Note: W = Wins; L = Losses; ERA = Earned run average; G = Games pitched; GS = Games started; SV = Saves; IP = Innings pitched; H = Hits allowed; R = Runs allowed; ER = Earned runs allowed; BB = Walks allowed; K = Strikeouts

Player	W	L	ERA	G	GS	SV	IP	H	R	ER	BB	K
Marco Gonzales	7	2	3.10	11	11	0	69.2	59	27	24	7	64
Justus Sheffield	4	3	3.58	10	10	0	55.1	52	23	22	20	48
Yusei Kikuchi	2	4	5.17	9	9	0	47.0	41	27	27	20	47
Justin Dunn	4	1	4.34	10	10	0	45.2	31	23	22	31	38
Nick Margevicius	2	3	4.57	10	7	0	41.1	38	21	21	14	36
Taijuan Walker	2	2	4.00	5	5	0	27.0	21	13	12	8	25
Taylor Williams	1	1	5.93	14	0	6	13.2	12	9	9	7	19
Yohan Ramírez	0	0	2.61	16	0	3	20.2	9	6	6	20	26
Anthony Misiewicz	0	2	4.05	21	0	0	20.0	20	9	9	6	25
Joey Gerber	1	1	4.02	17	0	0	15.2	13	8	7	5	6
Yoshihisa Hirano	0	1	5.84	13	0	4	12.1	18	9	8	8	11
Kendall Graveman	1	3	5.79	11	2	0	18.2	15	13	12	8	15
Ljay Newsome	0	1	5.17	5	4	0	15.2	20	9	9	1	9
Brady Lail	0	0	4.80	7	0	0	15.0	12	8	8	7	11
Dan Altavilla	1	2	7.71	13	0	1	11.2	12	11	10	7	14
Matt Magill	0	1	6.10	11	0	0	10.1	9	7	7	6	11
Casey Sadler	1	2	4.50	7	0	0	10.0	7	7	5	4	12
Walker Lockett	0	0	4.32	5	0	0	8.1	12	4	4	1	3
Taylor Guilbeau	0	0	1.17	8	0	0	7.2	8	1	1	6	3
Erik Swanson	0	2	12.91	9	0	0	7.2	11	12	11	2	9
Nestor Cortes Jr.	0	1	15.26	5	1	0	7.2	12	14	13	6	8
Brandon Brennan	0	0	3.68	5	0	0	7.1	7	3	3	5	7
Zac Grotz	0	0	14.73	5	0	0	7.1	11	12	12	11	4
Bryan Shaw	1	0	18.00	6	0	0	6.0	13	12	12	6	4
Carl Edwards Jr.	0	0	1.93	5	0	1	4.2	2	1	1	1	6
Aaron Fletcher	0	0	12.46	6	0	0	4.1	7	6	6	7	7
Seth Frankoff	0	0	16.88	2	0	0	2.2	6	5	5	2	0
Jimmy Yacabonis	0	1	3.86	2	1	0	2.1	2	1	1	3	1
Tim Lopes	0	0	18.00	1	0	0	1.0	2	2	2	1	0
Team totals	27	33	5.03	60	60	15	516.2	482	303	289	230	469

== Farm system ==
Level	Team	League	Manager
AAA	Tacoma Rainiers	Pacific Coast League	
AA	Arkansas Travelers	Texas League	
A-Advanced	Modesto Nuts	California League	
A	West Virginia Power	South Atlantic League	
A-Short Season	Everett AquaSox	Northwest League	
Rookie	AZL Mariners	Arizona League	
Rookie	DSL Mariners 1	Dominican Summer League	
Rookie	DSL Mariners 2	Dominican Summer League	
