= Casey Sadler =

American baseball player (born 1990)

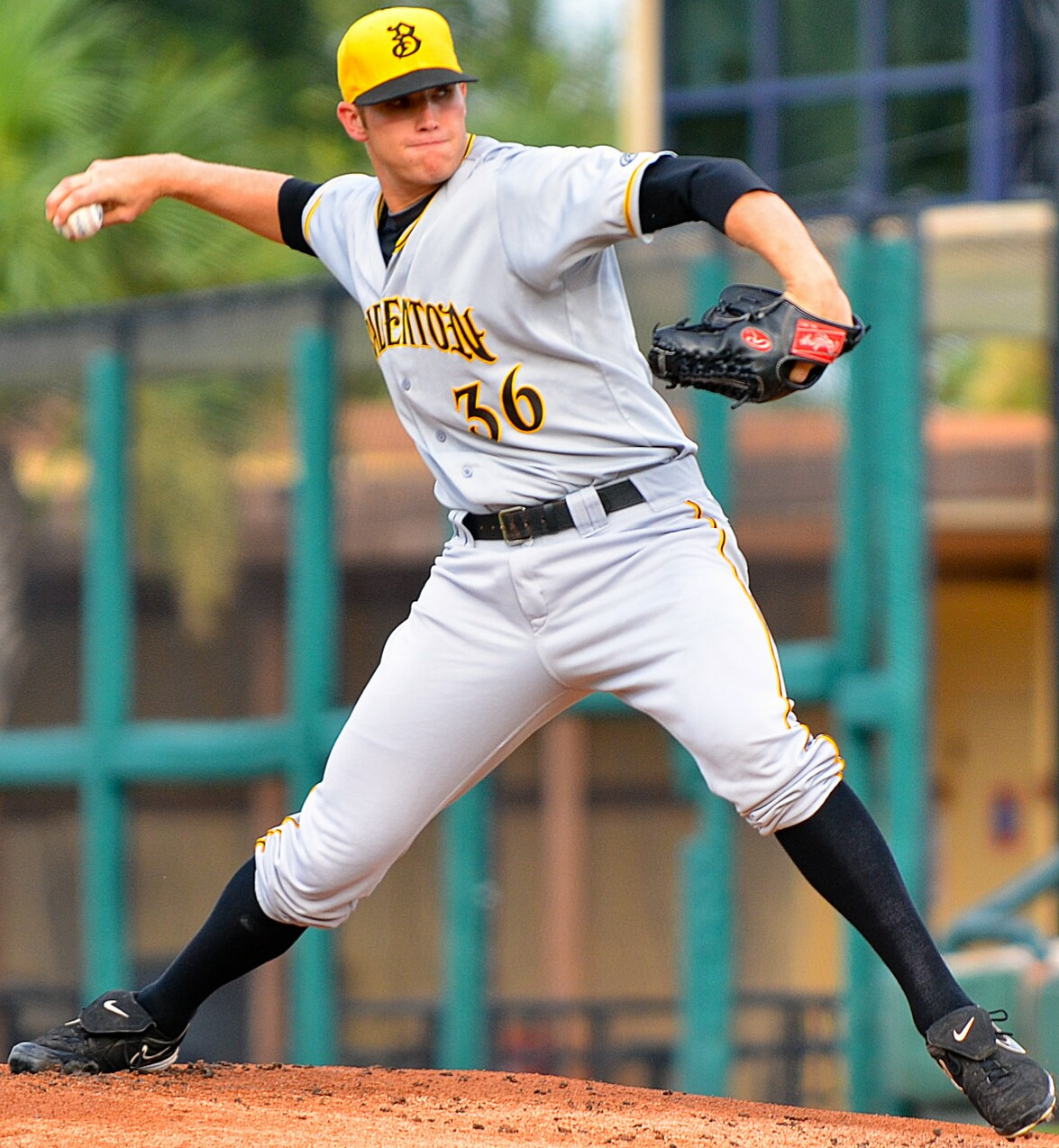
- Sadler in 2012
- Pitcher
- Born: July 13, 1990 (age 36); Ripley, Oklahoma, U.S.
- Batted: Right Threw: Right

MLB debut
- May 2, 2014, for the Pittsburgh Pirates

Last MLB appearance
- October 3, 2021, for the Seattle Mariners

MLB statistics
- Win–loss record: 6–4
- Earned run average: 2.86
- Strikeouts: 104
- Stats at Baseball Reference

Teams
- Pittsburgh Pirates (2014–2015, 2018); Tampa Bay Rays (2019); Los Angeles Dodgers (2019); Chicago Cubs (2020); Seattle Mariners (2020–2021)

Casey Scott Sadler (born July 13, 1990) is an American former professional baseball pitcher. Between 2014 and 2021, he played in Major League Baseball (MLB) for the Pittsburgh Pirates, Tampa Bay Rays, Los Angeles Dodgers, Chicago Cubs, and Seattle Mariners.

== Career ==
=== Pittsburgh Pirates ===
After graduating from Ripley High School in Ripley, Oklahoma, Sadler attended Western Oklahoma State College for two years. The Pirates selected Sadler in the 25th round of the 2010 Major League Baseball draft, He made his professional debut with the Low-A State College Spikes. In 2011, Sadler played for the Single-A West Virginia Power, recording a 5–5 record and 2.43 ERA in 35 appearances. The next year he played for the High-A Bradenton Marauders, pitching to a 4–6 record and 3.73 ERA in 32 games. In 2013, Sadler split the year between the Double-A Altoona Curve and the Triple-A Indianapolis Indians, posting an 11–7 record and 3.37 ERA between the two teams. Sadler was added to the Pirates' 40-man roster after the 2013 season.

Sadler was optioned to the Triple-A Indianapolis Indians on March 10, 2014. He was recalled by the Pirates on April 27, and made his major league debut against the Toronto Blue Jays on May 2. He was optioned back to the Indians on May 5 to make room for Jeff Locke on the active roster. In 2014 he was 0–1 with a 7.84 ERA.

After starting pitcher Francisco Liriano was placed on paternity leave, Sadler made his first career major league start on April 12, 2015, pitching five innings and earning the first win of his career in a 10–2 victory against the Milwaukee Brewers.

Sadler missed the entire 2016 season due to Tommy John surgery. On January 8, 2016, Sadler was released by the Pirates. He was re-signed by the Pirates the next day. In 2017, Sadler split the season between Bradenton, Altoona, and Indianapolis, registering a 4.00 ERA with 66 strikeouts in 78.2 innings of work.

He began the 2018 season with Indianapolis before being selected to the active roster on July 23, 2018. In 2 appearances for the Pirates in 2018, he was 0–0 with an 8.31 ERA. On August 16, Sadler was designated for assignment by the Pirates. He was outrighted to Indianapolis on August 22 and elected free agency on October 2, 2018.

=== Tampa Bay Rays ===
On December 6, 2018, Sadler signed a minor league deal with the Tampa Bay Rays. He opened the 2019 season with the Durham Bulls. On April 19, his contract was selected and he was recalled to the major league roster. On June 29, he was designated for assignment.

=== Los Angeles Dodgers ===
On July 3, 2019, the Rays traded Sadler to the Los Angeles Dodgers in exchange for Nathan Witt. He made his debut on July 15, 2019, pitching two innings against the Philadelphia Phillies. On August 28, 2019, Sadler picked up his first big league save against the San Diego Padres. Overall, he appeared in 24 games for the Dodgers (including making one start) and was 4–0 with a 2.33 ERA while striking out 20 batters in 27 innings. He was designated for assignment on January 15, 2020.

=== Chicago Cubs ===
On January 17, 2020, the Chicago Cubs acquired Sadler from the Dodgers in exchange for infielder Clayton Daniel. He went 0–0 with a 5.79 ERA, appearing in 10 games of the COVID-19-shortened season. Sadler was designated for assignment by the Cubs organization on September 1.

=== Seattle Mariners ===
On September 5, 2020, the Seattle Mariners claimed Sadler off waivers from the Cubs. Upon joining the Mariners, Sadler appeared in 7 games to finish out 2020, going 1–2 with a 4.50 ERA.

On May 30, 2021, Sadler was placed on the 60-day injured list with a right shoulder impingement. Sadler was activated off of the injured list on July 23, after missing nearly two months of action. Sadler completed the 2021 season with an ERA of 0.67 over 40 1/3 innings pitched.

In March 2022, Sadler was dealing with inflammation in his right shoulder resulting from his previous injury in 2021. Mariners manager Scott Servais said that Sadler would be out indefinitely pending a decision on surgery. On March 20, Sadler opted to undergo season-ending surgery. On November 9, Sadler was removed from the 40-man roster and sent outright to the Triple–A Tacoma Rainiers; he subsequently elected free agency the same day.

On December 7, 2022, Sadler re-signed with the Mariners on a minor league deal. He split the 2023 season between the rookie–level Arizona Complex League Mariners, High–A Everett AquaSox, and Triple–A Tacoma Rainiers. In 22 games between the three affiliates, Sadler struggled to a 7.71 ERA with 21 strikeouts across 18 2/3 innings pitched. He elected free agency following the season on November 6, 2023.

On November 27, 2024, Sadler announced his retirement from professional baseball on Twitter.
