= Kyle Lewis =

American baseball player (born 1995)

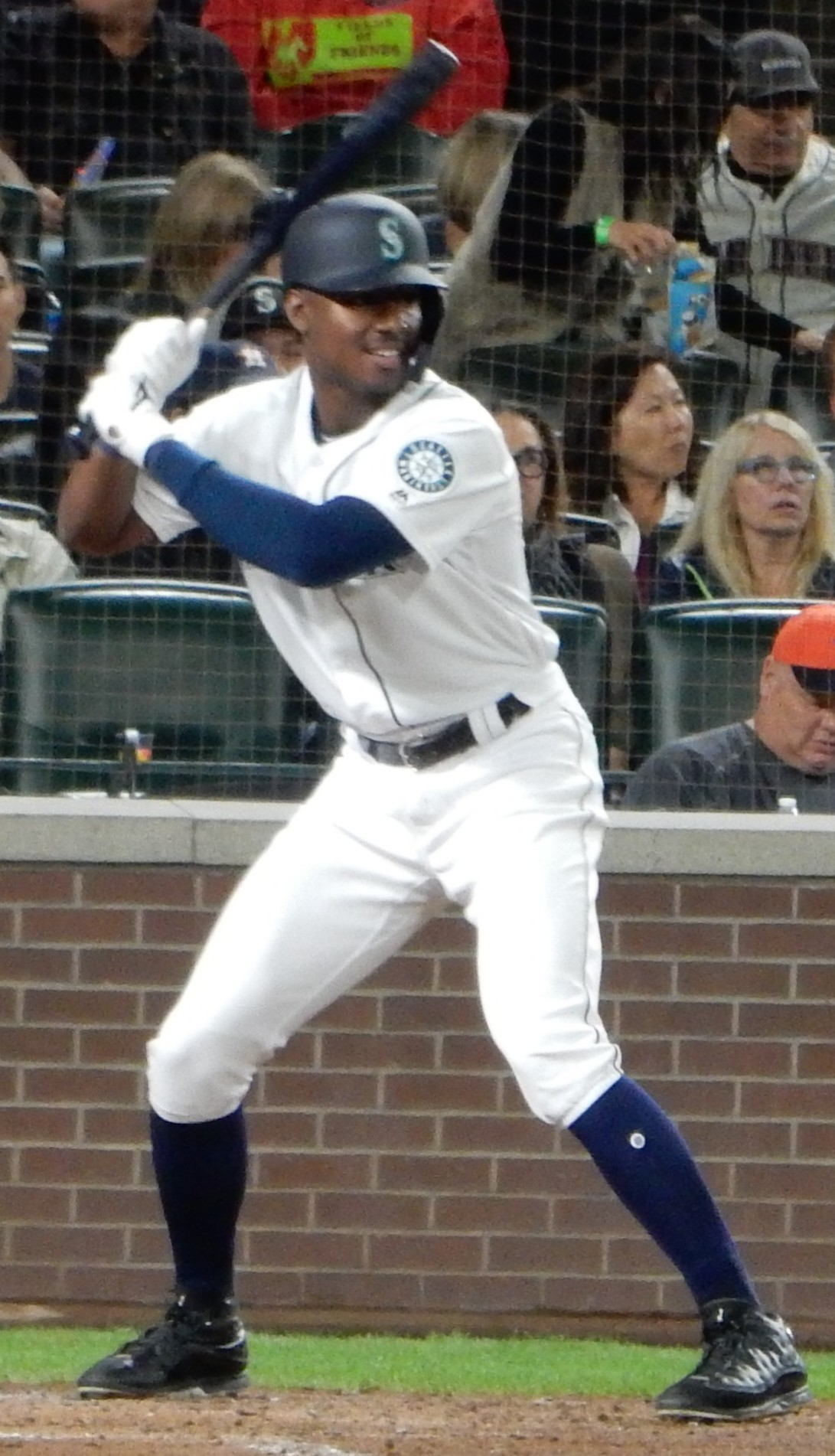
- Lewis with the Seattle Mariners in 2019
- Outfielder
- Born: July 13, 1995 (age 31); Snellville, Georgia, U.S.
- Batted: Right Threw: Right

MLB debut
- September 10, 2019, for the Seattle Mariners

Last MLB appearance
- August 19, 2023, for the Arizona Diamondbacks

MLB statistics
- Batting average: .235
- Home runs: 26
- Runs batted in: 59
- Stats at Baseball Reference

Teams
- Seattle Mariners (2019–2022); Arizona Diamondbacks (2023)

Career highlights and awards
- AL Rookie of the Year (2020); Golden Spikes Award (2016)

Kyle Alexander Lewis (born July 13, 1995) is an American former professional baseball outfielder. He played in Major League Baseball (MLB) for the Seattle Mariners and Arizona Diamondbacks. Prior to his MLB debut, he played college baseball for the Mercer Bears.

For his 2016 performance at Mercer, Lewis was named an All-American, Baseball America's 2016 College Player of the Year, and won the 2016 Golden Spikes Award. He was selected in the first round of the 2016 Major League Baseball draft by the Seattle Mariners.

Lewis made his major league debut in September 2019, and was unanimously selected as the 2020 American League Rookie of the Year.

== Amateur career ==
Lewis attended Shiloh High School in Snellville, Georgia. He played both baseball and basketball in high school. He chose baseball over basketball and attended Mercer University, where he played college baseball for the Bears. As a freshman in 2014, he appeared in 42 games with 17 starts and hit .281/.340/.382 with two home runs and 17 runs batted in (RBI) over 89 at-bats. After his freshman season he played collegiate summer baseball in the Cape Cod Baseball League (CCBL) for the Cotuit Kettleers. As a sophomore in 2015, he played in 54 games, hitting .367/.423/.677 with 17 home runs and 56 RBI. He was the Southern Conference Baseball Player of the Year and was the co-winner of the Gregg Olson Award, bestowed upon college baseball's breakout player of the year. After the season, Lewis returned to the CCBL to play for the Orleans Firebirds and was named a league all-star.

As a junior at Mercer, he hit .395/.535/.731 with 20 home runs and 72 RBI, and was named an All-American by Louisville Slugger, Baseball America, the American Baseball Coaches Association, and Collegiate Baseball. Following that season, Lewis received the 2016 Golden Spikes Award, which is awarded annually to the best amateur baseball player in the United States. In addition, he was the Southern Conference Baseball Player of the Year for the second straight year and was named both Baseball America's College Player of the Year and the American Baseball Coaches Association's Division I National Player of the Year.

== Professional career ==
=== Minor Leagues ===
The Seattle Mariners selected Lewis with the 11th overall pick in the 2016 Major League Baseball draft. He made his professional debut with the Everett AquaSox. Lewis only played 30 games for the Everett AquaSox due to a right ACL injury, batting .299 with three home runs and 26 RBIs. He spent 2017 with both the AZL Mariners and the Modesto Nuts, posting a combined .257 average with seven home runs and 31 RBIs in 49 games between both clubs, and 2018 with Modesto and the Arkansas Travelers, batting .244 with nine home runs and 52 RBIs in 86 games with the two teams.

Lewis returned to Arkansas for the 2019 season, hitting .263/.343/.398/.741 with 11 home runs and 62 RBI over 122 games.

=== Seattle Mariners ===
The Mariners selected Lewis' contract and promoted him to the major leagues on September 10, 2019. Lewis hit a home run off Trevor Bauer in his major league debut that night versus the Cincinnati Reds. He hit home runs in each of his next two games as well, becoming the second player in history, after Trevor Story, to homer in each of his first three major league games. He finished the 2019 season with a .268/.293/.592 slash line along with 6 home runs and 13 RBIs in 71 at bats.

In 2020, Lewis became the first Mariners player to be selected for the American League Rookie of the Year award since 2001, finishing the abbreviated season with a .262/.364/.437 slash line, 11 home runs, and 28 RBIs across 206 at bats. He was awarded the title of American League Rookie of the Year by numerous other publications, including Sporting News.

On June 1, 2021, Lewis was placed on the injured list after suffering a right meniscus tear. He was placed on the 60-day injured list on June 18 and subsequently missed the rest of the season.

Lewis went into MLB's concussion protocol after having been hit by a pitch in a game against the Houston Astros on May 29, 2022. He returned to the active roster on July 22. After continuing to struggle at the plate, and still dealing with issues related to his knee, Lewis was demoted to the Triple-A Tacoma Rainiers, where he ended the 2022 season.

=== Arizona Diamondbacks ===
On November 17, 2022, the Mariners traded Lewis to the Arizona Diamondbacks in exchange for Cooper Hummel. On January 13, 2023, Lewis agreed to a one-year, $1.61 million contract with the Diamondbacks, avoiding salary arbitration. He made 16 appearances for Arizona, batting .157/.204/.255 with one home run and two RBI. Lewis was non-tendered by the Diamondbacks and became a free agent on November 17.
