= Joseph Odom =

American baseball player (born 1992)

- Catcher
- Born: January 9, 1992 (age 34); Birmingham, Alabama, U.S.
- Batted: Right Threw: Right

MLB debut
- July 28, 2020, for the Seattle Mariners

Last MLB appearance
- April 7, 2021, for the Tampa Bay Rays

MLB statistics
- Batting average: .122
- Home runs: 0
- Runs batted in: 2
- Stats at Baseball Reference

Teams
- Seattle Mariners (2020); Tampa Bay Rays (2021)

Joseph Caleb Odom (born January 9, 1992) is an American former professional baseball catcher. He played in Major League Baseball (MLB) for the Seattle Mariners and Tampa Bay Rays.

== Career ==
Odom attended Vestavia Hills High School in Vestavia Hills, Alabama. He played for the school's baseball team as a catcher, serving as a defensive replacement. He did not begin to start for Vestavia Hills until he lost weight in his junior year. He graduated from Vestavia Hills in 2010, and enrolled at Huntingdon College, where played college baseball for the Huntingdon Hawks. In 2013, he had a .369 batting average and led all of NCAA Division III with 14 home runs.

=== Atlanta Braves ===
The Atlanta Braves selected Odom in the 13th round, with the 403rd overall selection, of the 2013 Major League Baseball draft. After he signed with Atlanta, he made his professional debut at the rookie-level. In 30 games split between the Gulf Coast League Braves and Danville Braves, he batted .216/.310/.257 with 6 RBI. In 2014, Odom played for the Lynchburg Hillcats of the High–A Carolina League. In 61 games for Lynchburg, he hit .205/.313/.341 with 6 home runs and 20 RBI.

He spent the 2015 season with the Carolina Mudcats of the Carolina League, playing in 65 games and slashing .222/.285/.403 with career–highs in home runs (7) and RBI (40). Odom was invited by the Braves to spring training as a non-roster player in 2016. He split the ensuing season between Carolina and the Double–A Mississippi Braves, batting .278/.327/.431 with a career–high 9 home runs and 38 RBI in 91 total games. Odom returned to Carolina and Mississippi in 2017, but played in only 28 games and hit .266/.329/.359 with one home run and 8 RBI.

=== Seattle Mariners ===
On December 14, 2017, the Seattle Mariners selected Odom from the Braves in the minor league portion of the Rule 5 draft. In 2018, Odom spent the majority of the season with the Double–A Arkansas Travelers, also playing in 6 games for the Triple–A Tacoma Rainiers. In 76 games for Arkansas, he batted .241/.300/.361 with 5 home runs and 36 RBI. Odom split the 2019 season between Arkansas and Tacoma, playing in 98 games and hitting a combined .235/.302/.339 with 6 home runs and 34 RBI.

Odom was not assigned to an affiliate in 2020 after the minor league season was cancelled because of the COVID-19 pandemic. On July 28, 2020, Odom was selected to the 40-man roster and promoted to the major leagues for the first time. He made his MLB debut that night. In 18 games, he went 5–for–39 (.128) with 2 RBI and 4 walks. Odom was outrighted off of the 40-man roster on October 19. He elected free agency following the year on November 2.

=== Tampa Bay Rays ===
On December 16, 2020, Odom signed a minor league contract with the Tampa Bay Rays organization. On April 3, 2021, Odom was selected to the 40-man roster to take the roster spot of Ryan Sherriff, who had been placed on the restricted list. On April 9, Odom was designated for assignment after Hunter Strickland was added to the roster. In his time with Tampa, he registered two hitless at-bats. On April 12, Odom cleared waivers and was outrighted to the alternate training site. In 29 games for the Triple–A Durham Bulls, he batted .217/.305/.359 with 3 home runs and 15 RBI. On October 16, Odom elected free agency.

=== Seattle Mariners (second stint) ===
On March 28, 2022, Odom signed a minor league contract with the Seattle Mariners organization. Odom played in 62 games for the Triple-A Tacoma Rainiers, batting .231/.328/.447 with 10 home runs, 25 RBI, and 2 stolen bases. He was released by Seattle on August 17.

On March 19, 2023, Odom announced his retirement from professional baseball via Instagram.
