= Southern Conference Baseball Player of the Year =

- Awarded for: the most outstanding baseball Player in the Southern Conference
- Country: United States
- First award: 1972
- Currently held by: Chris Katz, Mercer

The Southern Conference Baseball Player of the Year is a baseball award given to the Southern Conference's most outstanding player. The award was first given after the 1972 season. The Southern Conference began sponsoring baseball in 1947.

== Key ==
Player (X)	Denotes the number of times the player had been awarded the Player of the Year award at that point

== Winners ==
Season	Player	School	Reference
1972	Reggie Dunnavant	Richmond	
1973	Steve Arrington	The Citadel	
1974	Mike Ramsey	Appalachian State	
1975	George Weicker	Davidson	
1976	Richard Wieters	The Citadel	
1977	Richard Wieters (2)	The Citadel	
1978	Wayne Tolleson	Western Carolina	
1979	Randy Ingle	Appalachian State	
1980	Gary Robinette	East Tennessee State	
1981	Mel Kinsey	Western Carolina	
1982	Bill White	The Citadel	
1983	Mike Cherry	The Citadel	
1984	Tony Welborn	Appalachian State	
1985	Scott Gay	Western Carolina	
1986	Len Stratton	Appalachian State	
1987	Clint Fairey	Western Carolina	
1988	Clint Fairey (2)	Western Carolina	
1989	Clint Fairey (3)	Western Carolina	
1989	Scott Waugh	Appalachian State	
1990	Grant Brittain	Western Carolina	
1991	Kevin Bellomo	Western Carolina	
1992	Matt Raleigh	Western Carolina	
1993	Todd Greene	Georgia Southern	
1994	Mike Tidick	Western Carolina	
1995	Steve Wilson	Georgia Southern	
1996	Tommy Peterman	Georgia Southern	
1997	Alex Tolbert	Western Carolina	
1998	Martin Barrow	Western Carolina	
1999	Chris Moore	Western Carolina	
2000	Matt Easterday	Georgia Southern	
2001	Philip Hartig	The Citadel	
2002	Lee Curtis	College of Charleston	
2003	Alan Beck	Western Carolina	
2004	Caleb Moore	East Tennessee State	
2005	Jay Heafner	Davidson	
2006	A. J. Davdiuk	Furman	
2007	Kenny Smith	Western Carolina	
2008	Jeremie Tice	College of Charleston	
2009	Joey Bergman	College of Charleston	
2009	Chase Austin	Elon	
2010	Matt Leeds	College of Charleston	
2011	Victor Roache	Georgia Southern	
2012	Marty Gantt	College of Charleston	
2013	Ryan Kinsella	Elon	
2014	Forrest Brandt	Davidson	
2014	Casey Jones	Elon	
2015	Kyle Lewis	Mercer	
2016	Kyle Lewis (2)	Mercer	
2017	Bryson Bowman	Western Carolina	
2018	Andrew Mortiz	UNC Greensboro	
2019	Justice Bigbie	Western Carolina	
2021	Colin Davis	Wofford	
2022	Hogan Windish	UNC Greensboro	
2023	Ryan Galanie	Wofford	
2024	Caleb Cozart	UNC Greensboro	
2025	Cooper Torres	East Tennessee State	
2026	Chris Katz	Mercer	

== Winners by school ==
School (year joined)	Winners	Years
Western Carolina (1977)	17	1978, 1981, 1985, 1987, 1988, 1989, 1990, 1991, 1992, 1994, 1997, 1998, 1999, 2003, 2007, 2017, 2019
The Citadel (1947)	6	1973, 1976, 1977, 1982, 1983, 2001
Appalachian State (Note: Appalachian State departed the SoCon for the Sun Belt Conference after the 2014 season.) (1972)	5	1974, 1979, 1984, 1986, 1989
College of Charleston (Note: College of Charleston departed the SoCon for the Colonial Athletic Association after the 2013 season.) (1998)	5	2002, 2008, 2009, 2010, 2012
Georgia Southern (Note: Georgia Southern departed the SoCon for the Sun Belt Conference after the 2014 season.) (1993)	5	1993, 1995, 1996, 2000, 2011
Davidson (Note: Davidson was not a member of the SoCon from 1989 through 1992, and departed for the Atlantic 10 Conference after the 2014 season.) (1947)	3	1975, 2005, 2014
East Tennessee State (Note: East Tennessee State departed the SoCon for the Atlantic Sun Conference after the 2005 season, but returned beginning with the 2015 season.) (1979)	3	1980, 2004, 2025
Elon (Note: Elon departed the SoCon for the Colonial Athletic Association after the 2014 season.) (2003)	3	2009, 2013, 2014
Mercer (2015)	3	2015, 2016, 2026
UNC Greensboro (1981)	3	2018, 2022, 2024
Wofford (1998)	2	2021, 2023
Furman (1947)	1	2006
Richmond (Note: Richmond departed the SoCon to become an Independent after the 1976 season.) (1947)	1	1972
