= Taylor Williams =

American baseball player (born 1991)

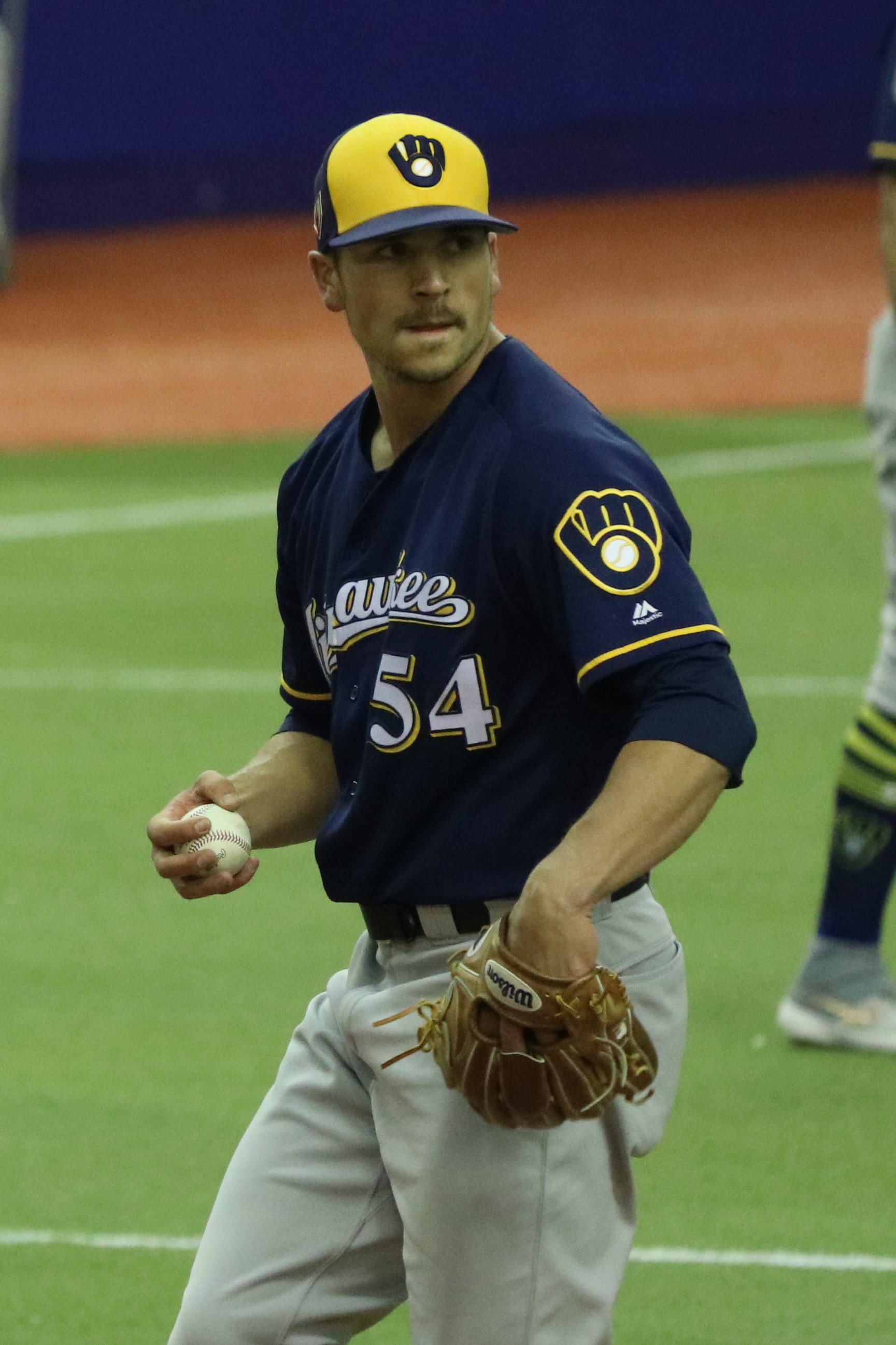
- Williams with the Brewers in 2019

Tecolotes de los Dos Laredos – No. 54
- Pitcher
- Born: July 21, 1991 (age 34); Vancouver, Washington, U.S.
- Bats: Switch Throws: Right

MLB debut
- September 6, 2017, for the Milwaukee Brewers

MLB statistics (through 2021 season)
- Win–loss record: 3–5
- Earned run average: 5.29
- Strikeouts: 105
- Stats at Baseball Reference

Teams
- Milwaukee Brewers (2017–2019); Seattle Mariners (2020); San Diego Padres (2020–2021); Miami Marlins (2021)

Taylor Grant Williams (born July 21, 1991) is an American professional baseball pitcher for the Tecolotes de los Dos Laredos of the Mexican League. He made his Major League Baseball (MLB) debut with the Milwaukee Brewers in 2017 and has also played for the Seattle Mariners, San Diego Padres, and Miami Marlins.

== Amateur career ==
Williams attended Camas High School in Camas, Washington. He played for the school's baseball team and graduated in 2010. Camas reached the state championship game in 2010. He won the most valuable player trophy at an all-state series.

Williams enrolled at Washington State University and played college baseball for the Washington State Cougars baseball team for one season. In 2012, Taylor pitched collegiate summer baseball for the Cowlitz Black Bears of the West Coast League. Discontented with Washington State, he transferred to Mount Hood Community College, a junior college. He then played summer baseball for the Keene Swamp Bats of the New England Collegiate Baseball League, where he had three members of the Kent State Golden Flashes baseball team as his teammates. Based on their recommendations, he transferred to Kent State. With the Golden Flashes, Williams had a 10-1 win–loss record with a 2.47 earned run average and 110 strikeouts. He was named to the Mid-American Conference's first-team.

== Professional career ==
=== Milwaukee Brewers ===
The Milwaukee Brewers selected Williams in the fourth round, with the 122nd overall pick, of the 2013 MLB draft. He signed with the Brewers, receiving a $400,000 signing bonus.

After signing, the Brewers assigned Williams to the Helena Brewers of the Rookie-level Pioneer League. In 12 games (six starts) for Helena, he was 3-1 with a 4.25 ERA. He began 2014 with the Wisconsin Timber Rattlers of the Class A Midwest League before being promoted to the Brevard County Manatees of the Class A-Advanced Florida State League. In 27 games (17 starts) for the two teams, he had a 9-3 record and 2.72 ERA. Williams missed the 2015 and 2016 seasons while recovering from Tommy John surgery.

The Brewers added Williams to their 40-man roster following the 2016 season. He played for the Biloxi Shuckers of the Double-A Southern League in 2017 where he compiled a 0-2 record and 3.09 ERA in 22 games (14 starts).

Williams was recalled from Biloxi on September 1, 2017, and he made his major league debut on September 6. In 4.2 innings pitched for Milwaukee, he compiled a 1.93 ERA. In 2018, Williams began the season with the Triple-A Colorado Springs Sky Sox and was recalled by Milwaukee on April 8. In 2019 for Milwaukee, Williams recorded a ghastly 9.82 ERA over 12 appearances. The Brewers designated Williams for assignment on February 19, 2020 following the club's acquisition of Brock Holt.

=== Seattle Mariners ===
On February 21, 2020, Williams was claimed off waivers by the Seattle Mariners. He served as the team's closer, earning 6 saves and pitching in 14 games with 19 strikeouts in 13 2/3 innings.

=== San Diego Padres ===
On August 31, 2020, Williams was traded to the San Diego Padres for Matt Brash. He only pitched once for the Padres in 2020, allowing one run while pitching the sixth inning of a win over the Colorado Rockies.

On June 5, 2021, Williams was placed on the 60-day injured list with right knee inflammation. Williams pitched 5 1/3 innings in 2021 for the Padres, giving up one run. On September 3, Williams was designated for assignment by the Padres.

=== Miami Marlins ===
Williams was claimed off waivers by the Miami Marlins on September 6, 2021. Williams pitched in six games for the Marlins, posting a 7.11 ERA with 3 strikeouts. On September 22, Williams was designated for assignment by the Marlins. On September 27, Williams elected free agency.

=== San Francisco Giants ===
On March 20, 2022, Williams signed a minor league contract with the San Francisco Giants. In 27 appearances for the Triple–A Sacramento River Cats, he struggled to a 2–1 record and 4.69 ERA with 68 strikeouts across 63 1/3 innings pitched. Williams was released by the Giants organization on July 17.

=== Seattle Mariners (second stint) ===
On July 22, 2022, Williams signed a minor league contract with the Seattle Mariners. Pitching for the Triple-A Tacoma Rainiers, he was 2-1 with one save and a 1.14 ERA in 23 2/3 innings. Williams elected free agency following the season on November 10.

On January 30, 2023, Williams re-signed with the Mariners on a minor league contract that included an invitation to spring training. He made 32 relief outings for Tacoma during the year, struggling to a 7.47 ERA with 30 strikeouts across 37 1/3 innings pitched. Williams elected free agency on November 6.

=== Algodoneros de Unión Laguna ===
On March 1, 2024, Williams signed with the Algodoneros de Unión Laguna of the Mexican League. In 47 games, he went 3–0 with a 2.63 ERA with 50 strikeouts in 48 innings of relief. Williams was selected as a Mexican League All-Star in 2024.

Williams made 27 appearances for the Algodoneros in 2025, but struggled to a 1-2 record and 10.38 ERA with 21 strikeouts across 21 2/3 innings pitched. On April 4, 2026, Williams was released by the team.

=== Tecolotes de los Dos Laredos ===
On June 2, 2026, Williams signed with the Tecolotes de los Dos Laredos of the Mexican League.
