= Pete Woodworth =

American baseball coach (born 1988)

Seattle Mariners – No. 32
- Pitching coach
- Born: July 29, 1988 (age 37); St. Petersburg, Florida, U.S.
- Bats: Right Throws: Right

Teams
- As coach: Seattle Mariners (2020–present)

Peter Graham Woodworth (born July 29, 1988) is an American professional baseball coach. He is the pitching coach for the Seattle Mariners of Major League Baseball (MLB).

== Career ==
Woodworth attended St. Petersburg Catholic High School in St. Petersburg, Florida. Woodworth attended the University of South Florida for one year, before transferring to Florida Gulf Coast University (FGCU). He played four years of college baseball for the FGCU Eagles and graduated with a bachelor's degree in history.

Woodworth went undrafted in the 2010 MLB draft, and signed a free agent contract with the Tampa Bay Rays. He spent his only professional season playing for the GCL Rays in 2010. Woodworth returned to FGCU as a volunteer assistant coach for the team from August 2011 until February 2012. He then rejoined the Rays as an area scout. He then served as the pitching coach for Nova Southeastern University in 2014. Woodworth returned to Florida Gulf Coast and served as their pitching coach in 2015 and 2016.

Woodworth was hired by the Seattle Mariners organization on June 22, 2016, to be the pitching coach for the Clinton LumberKings. He served as the Modesto Nuts pitching coach for the 2017 and 2018 seasons. He was the Arkansas Travelers pitching coach in 2019. He was named the 2019 Texas League Coach of the Year.

On November 7, 2019, Woodworth was named the pitching coach for the Seattle Mariners. He was named the 2022 MLB Coach of the Year by Baseball America.

== Personal life ==
Woodworth and his wife reside in St. Petersburg. They have two children.
