= José Marmolejos =

Dominican baseball player (born 1993)

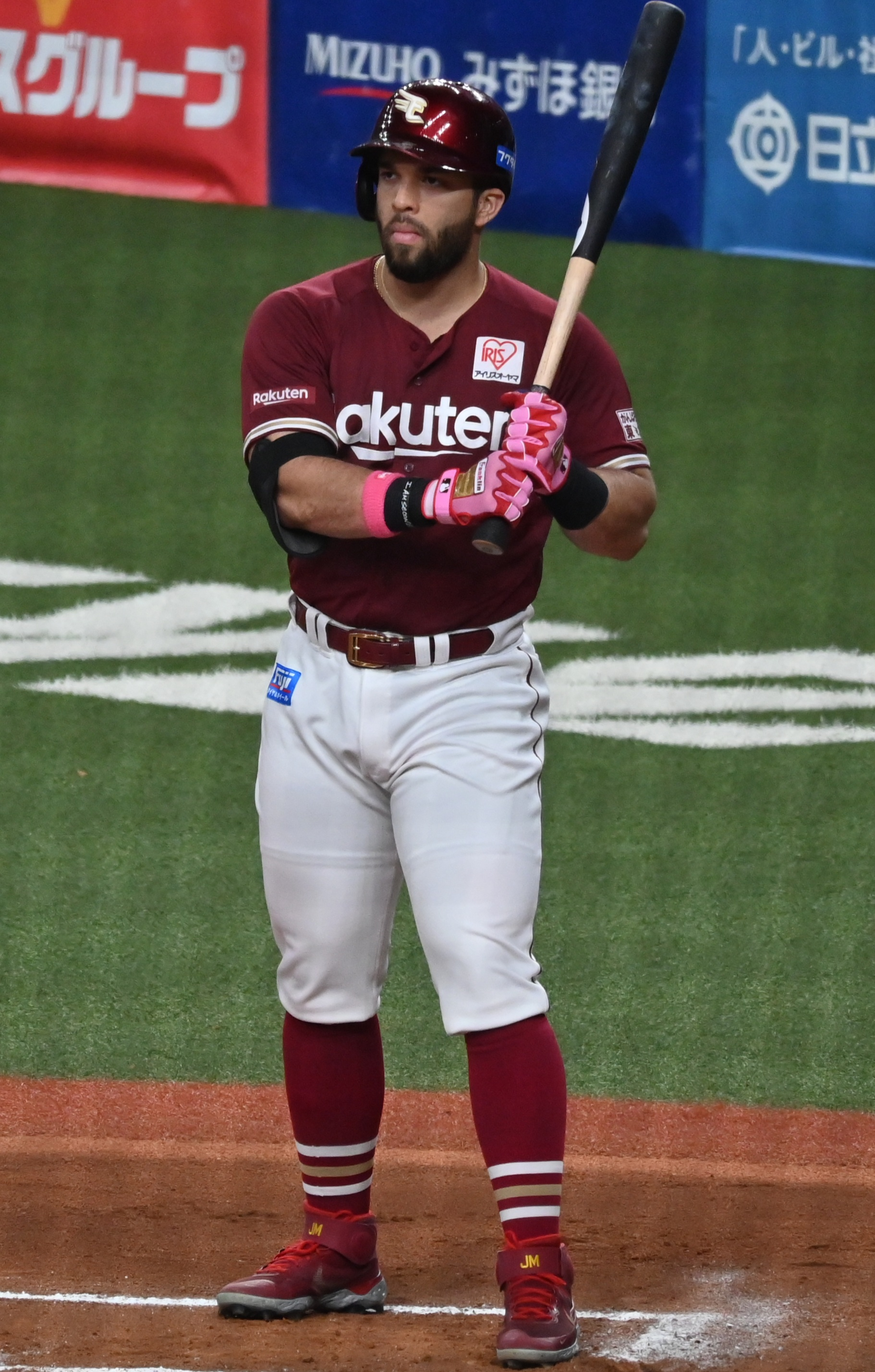
- Marmolejos with the Tohoku Rakuten Golden Eagles in 2022

Leones del Escogido – No. 57
- First baseman / Outfielder
- Born: January 2, 1993 (age 33); Perth Amboy, New Jersey, U.S.
- Bats: Left Throws: Left

Professional debut
- MLB: July 24, 2020, for the Seattle Mariners
- NPB: March 29, 2022, for the Tohoku Rakuten Golden Eagles

MLB statistics (through 2021 season)
- Batting average: .183
- Home runs: 10
- Runs batted in: 30

NPB statistics (through 2022 season)
- Batting average: .208
- Home runs: 7
- Runs batted in: 28
- Stats at Baseball Reference

Teams
- Seattle Mariners (2020–2021); Tohoku Rakuten Golden Eagles (2022)

José Ramon Marmolejos (born January 2, 1993), sometimes referred to as José Marmolejos-Diaz, is an American professional baseball first baseman and outfielder for the Diablos Rojos del México of the Mexican League. He has previously played in Major League Baseball (MLB) for the Seattle Mariners and in Nippon Professional Baseball (NPB) for the Tohoku Rakuten Golden Eagles.

== Early life ==
Marmolejos was born in Perth Amboy, New Jersey but moved to the Dominican Republic before his first birthday. He spent summers with family in the United States throughout his early childhood before returning to New Jersey for middle school. He attended high school both in Florida and the Dominican Republic.

== Career ==
=== Washington Nationals ===
Marmolejos signed with the Washington Nationals as an international free agent in June 2011. After hitting .310 over 124 games with 11 home runs for the Single–A Hagerstown Suns of the South Atlantic League in 2015, Marmolejos was named the Nationals' Minor League Player of the Year. He repeated in 2016, earning organizational Minor League Player of the Year honors with a combined .289 batting average and 13 home runs with the High–A Potomac Nationals and the Double–A Harrisburg Senators.

On November 18, 2016, the Nationals added Marmolejos to their 40-man roster to protect him from the Rule 5 draft. On February 24, 2017, Marmolejos was placed on the 60-day disabled list with a left forearm strain. While rehabbing, Marmolejos went 5-for-6 with the Harrisburg Senators in a May 22, 2017, game visiting the Erie SeaWolves. He capped off his day by hitting a two-out, go-ahead grand slam in the ninth inning, and the Senators won the ballgame 14–13. He was activated from the disabled list and assigned to continue playing for Double–A Harrisburg on June 1, 2017. He was named to participate in the Eastern League All-Star game in 2017. In total, he hit .288 with 14 home runs in 107 games in Double–A for the 2017 season. Marmolejos was designated for assignment on July 26, 2018. He remained with the Nationals and received a non-roster invitation to major league spring training before the 2019 season. Marmolejos elected free agency following the season on November 4, 2019.

=== Seattle Mariners ===
On November 27, 2019, Marmolejos signed a minor league contract with the Seattle Mariners, that included an invitation to spring training.

On July 24, 2020, Marmolejos made his MLB debut on Opening Day, going hitless over 3 at-bats against the Houston Astros. Marmolejos finished the 2020 season hitting .206 with 6 home runs and 18 RBI. Marmolejos hit .139 with 3 home runs and 9 RBI in 31 games for the Mariners in 2021 before being designated for assignment on May 20, 2021. He was outrighted to the Triple-A Tacoma Rainiers on May 23. After having a great stint with Triple-A Tacoma, hitting .360 with 23 home runs and 71 RBI's through 72 games, his contract was re-selected by the Mariners on August 30, 2021. On September 14, Marmolejos was once again designated for assignment by the Mariners. On October 5, Marmolejos elected free agency.

=== Tohoku Rakuten Golden Eagles ===
On December 7, 2021, Marmolejos signed with the Tohoku Rakuten Golden Eagles of Nippon Professional Baseball. He played in 58 games for Rakuten, hitting .208/.278/.342 with 7 home runs and 28 RBI. Marmolejos became a free agent following the 2022 season.

=== Spire City Ghost Hounds ===
On April 29, 2023, Marmolejos signed with the Spire City Ghost Hounds of the Atlantic League of Professional Baseball. In 107 games for Spire City, he batted .303/.395/.578 with 28 home runs and 90 RBI. Following the season, Marmolejos was named an Atlantic League All–Star.

=== Diablos Rojos del México ===
On November 2, 2023, Marmolejos was drafted by the Lexington Counter Clocks in the Ghost Hounds dispersal draft. However, on January 15, 2024, Marmolejos signed with the Diablos Rojos del México of the Mexican League. In 70 games, he hit .364/.470/.559 with 10 home runs, 48 RBI and three stolen bases. With the team, Marmolejos won the Serie del Rey, and was named the Series MVP.

Marmolejos made 53 appearances for the Diablos during the 2025 season, batting .330/.400/.495 with seven home runs and 41 RBI. With the team, Marmolejos won his second Serie del Rey title, and was named the Series MVP for the second consecutive season.
