= Joey Gerber =

American baseball player (born 1997)

Free agent
- Pitcher
- Born: May 3, 1997 (age 29); Maple Grove, Minnesota, U.S.
- Bats: Right Throws: Right

MLB debut
- August 4, 2020, for the Seattle Mariners

MLB statistics (through July 4, 2026)
- Win–loss record: 1–1
- Earned run average: 3.81
- Strikeouts: 18
- Stats at Baseball Reference

Teams
- Seattle Mariners (2020); Tampa Bay Rays (2025); New York Mets (2026)

Joseph Cliff Gerber (born May 3, 1997) is an American professional baseball pitcher who is a free agent. He has previously played in Major League Baseball (MLB) for the Seattle Mariners, Tampa Bay Rays, and New York Mets.

== Amateur career ==
Gerber graduated from Wayzata High School in Plymouth, Minnesota in 2015. He went undrafted in the 2015 Major League Baseball draft out of high school and enrolled at the University of Illinois where he played college baseball for the Fighting Illini.

As a freshman at Illinois in 2016, Gerber pitched only six innings, compiling a 7.50 ERA. In 2017, his sophomore season, he went 2–1 with a 4.36 ERA in 33 relief innings pitched, striking out 43. In 2017, he played collegiate summer baseball with the Mankato MoonDogs of the Northwoods League. In 2018, as a junior for the Illini, Gerber went 1–1 with a 3.14 ERA in 28 2/3 relief innings along with compiling 14 saves, tying the Illinois single-season record, earning a spot on the All-Big Ten Third Team.

== Professional career ==
=== Seattle Mariners ===
The Seattle Mariners drafted Gerber in the eighth round, with the 238th overall selection, of the 2018 Major League Baseball draft. Gerber signed with Seattle and made his professional debut with the Everett AquaSox of the Low–A Northwest League before being promoted to the Clinton LumberKings of the Single–A Midwest League in July. In 23 2/3 relief innings between the two clubs, he went 1–0 with a 2.10 ERA and 43 strikeouts. Gerber began the 2019 season with the Modesto Nuts of the High–A California League, earning All-Star honors. He was promoted to the Arkansas Travelers of the Double–A Texas League in June, and finished the season there. Over 48 2/3 relief innings pitched between the two clubs, Gerber went 1–4 with a 2.59 ERA, striking out 69 and compiling a .215 batting average against.

On August 4, 2020, Gerber made his MLB debut against the Los Angeles Angels, pitching one scoreless inning. He ended the 2020 season with a 1–1 record and a 4.02 ERA, striking out six batters over 15 2/3 innings. Gerber began the 2021 season on the injured list and underwent back surgery in July, forcing him to miss the whole year. He missed the beginning of the 2022 season due to the injury and was ultimately designated for assignment on June 18, 2022. He was released on June 22.

=== New York Yankees ===
On July 25, 2022, Gerber signed a minor league contract with the New York Yankees.

Gerber returned to game action in June 2024 with the rookie–level Florida Complex League Yankees. In 26 appearances split between the FCL Yankees, Single–A Tampa Tarpons, Double–A Somerset Patriots, and Triple–A Scranton/Wilkes-Barre RailRiders, he accumulated a 2–1 record and 2.43 ERA with 40 strikeouts across 33 2/3 innings pitched. Gerber elected free agency following the season on November 4, 2024.

=== Tampa Bay Rays ===
On December 18, 2024, Gerber signed a minor league contract with the Tampa Bay Rays. On July 17, 2025, the Rays added Gerber to their 40-man roster and subsequently optioned him to the Triple-A Durham Bulls. In two appearances for Tampa Bay, he recorded a 2.08 ERA with four strikeouts across 4 1/3 innings pitched. Gerber was designated for assignment by the Rays on November 3.

=== New York Mets ===
On November 4, 2025, the Rays traded Gerber to the New York Mets in exchange for cash considerations. Gerber was optioned to the Triple-A Syracuse Mets to begin the 2026 season. He made seven appearances for New York, recording a 4.32 ERA with eight strikeouts across 8 1/3 innings pitched. Gerber was designated for assignment by the Mets on August 2, 2026; he cleared waivers and was released the same day.
