= Tacoma Rainiers =

Minor league baseball team

- Founded in 1960; Tacoma, Washington

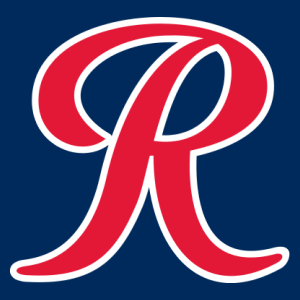
Team logo	Cap insignia

Minor league affiliations
- Class: Triple-A (1960–present)
- League: Pacific Coast League (1960–present)
- Division: West Division

Major league affiliations
- Team: Seattle Mariners (1995–present)
- Previous teams: Oakland Athletics (1981–1994); Cleveland Indians (1979–1980); New York Yankees (1978); Minnesota Twins (1972–1977); Chicago Cubs (1966–1971); San Francisco Giants (1960–1965)

Minor league titles
- League titles (6): 1961; 1969; 1978; 2001; 2010; 2021
- Conference titles (3): 2001; 2005; 2010
- Division titles (10): 1969; 1971; 1978; 1981; 2001; 2005; 2009; 2010; 2016; 2021
- First-half titles (3): 1982; 1987; 1990
- Second-half titles (2): 1981; 2025

Team data
- Name: Tacoma Rainiers (1995–present)
- Previous names: Tacoma Tigers (1980–1994); Tacoma Tugs (1979); Tacoma Yankees (1978); Tacoma Twins (1972–1977); Tacoma Cubs (1966–1971); Tacoma Giants (1960–1965)
- Colors: Navy blue, red, white
- Mascot: Rhubarb the Reindeer
- Ballpark: Cheney Stadium (1960–present)
- Owner/ Operator: The Baseball Club of Tacoma
- General manager: Aaron Artman
- Manager: John Russell
- Website: milb.com/tacoma

The Tacoma Rainiers are a Minor League Baseball team of the Pacific Coast League (PCL) and the Triple-A affiliate of the Seattle Mariners. They are located in Tacoma, Washington, and play their home games at Cheney Stadium, which opened in 1960. Tacoma has competed in the PCL since 1960, including the 2021 season when it was known as the Triple-A West. The team operated under several monikers before becoming the Rainiers in 1995.

Tacoma has won the PCL championship six times (1961, 1969, 1978, 2001, 2010, and 2021).

== History ==
=== 1904–1905: Tacoma Tigers ===
Tacoma's first team in the PCL was the Tacoma Tigers, who joined the league in 1904, having moved from Sacramento after the 1903 season. The 1904 Tigers won Tacoma's first PCL pennant, finishing first in both halves of the split season schedule, seven games (annualized) over the runner-up Los Angeles Angels. The 1905 Tigers won the first-half championship, then lost the postseason series to the Angels. After the season owner Mike Fisher relocated the team as the Fresno Raisin Eaters.

The PCL did not return to Tacoma for 55 years; however, another Tacoma Tigers franchise operated in the Western International League from the 1930s through 1951. Owned by William Starr of San Diego, they were affiliated with the San Diego Padres of the PCL. The team was sold, relocated to north central Idaho, and became the Lewiston Broncs in 1952.

=== 1960–1965: Tacoma Giants ===
The current PCL franchise was founded in 1960 when the Phoenix Giants, a San Francisco Giants affiliate, moved to Tacoma and became the Tacoma Giants, the first team to play at brand-new Cheney Stadium.

The Giants' first win at Cheney Stadium came on April 16, 1960—an 11-0 victory over Portland in game two of a doubleheader. Future Hall Of Fame pitcher Juan Marichal worked the victory, giving Tacoma their first franchise shutout performance.

The 1961 iteration of the club posted a 97–57 record under manager Red Davis, who steered a team led by Gaylord Perry, Ron Herbel, Eddie Fisher, and Dick Phillips. Following a season in which he hit .264 with 16 home runs and 98 RBI, Phillips was named the 1961 PCL Most Valuable Player (MVP). The franchise did not have another MVP winner until José Marmolejos in 2021.

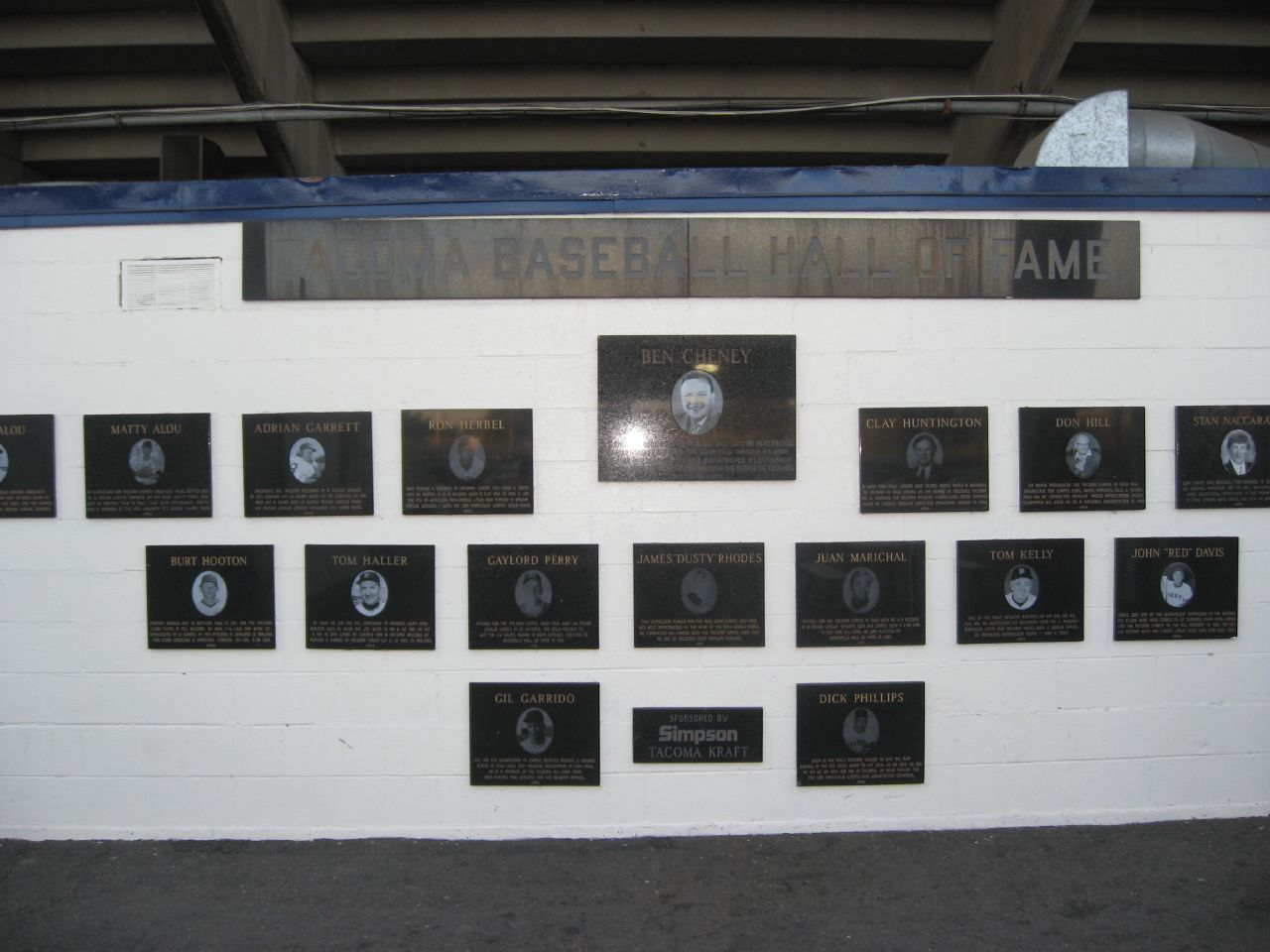
Tacoma Baseball Hall of Fame at Cheney Stadium

=== 1966–1971: Tacoma Cubs ===
In 1965, the Giants moved its PCL team back to Phoenix. However, the Chicago Cubs chose to move their affiliate, the Salt Lake City Bees, to Tacoma the same year and renamed the team the Tacoma Cubs.

Tacoma played as a Cubs affiliate for six seasons, compiling a 410–466 (.468) record. The Tacoma Cubs were managed by Whitey Lockman for their first four seasons, including a 1969 PCL Championship after finishing the year 86–60. The 1969 Cubs pitching staff compiled a 3.01 team ERA, and bested Eugene for the league championship 3–2 in a best-of-five series.

=== 1972–1977: Tacoma Twins ===
Following the 1971 season, the Cubs left town. Local businessmen Stan Naccarato and Clay Huntington spearheaded a group of local investors who purchased the franchise and secured an affiliation with the Minnesota Twins, who renamed the team the Tacoma Twins. The new local ownership team, known as the Tacoma Twins Baseball Club Directors, comprised the following: E.J. Zarelli (President); Stan Naccarato (General Manager-Vice President); Frank Manley (Treasurer); Tom Baker (Secretary); and Clay Huntington, Alden Woodworth, Francis Browne, Robert Alessandro, Mike Tucci Jr., Walt Wiklund, Dr. Robert Johnson, Lawrence Ghilarducci Sr., James Topping, Marley Brotman, Carl Miraldi, Frank Ruffo, Douglas Goneya, Ray Carlson, Frank Pupo, Bill Cammarano Sr., and Mike Block (Vice Presidents).

Through six seasons as a Twins affiliate, Tacoma compiled a 422–441 (.489) record with no league championships.

During the Twins era, infielder Rick Renick (1973–76) slugged his way to 72 home runs, giving him the most career home runs in franchise history. In the midst of a 1977 season in which he hit .321 with 25 home runs and 117 RBI, first baseman Randy Bass notched four home runs on June 9, 1977 at Phoenix. Bass is one of only six players in PCL history to hit four or more home runs in one game.

Future Toronto Blue Jays broadcaster Jerry Howarth broadcast games for Tacoma during this period.

=== 1978: Tacoma Yankees ===
For one season, the Tacoma franchise was affiliated with the New York Yankees. As the Yankees compiled a 100-win 1978 season that culminated in an American League East title over the Boston Red Sox, the Tacoma Yankees compiled an 80–57 record and advanced to the league championship. The 1978 PCL championship series with Albuquerque was cancelled due to rain, so Tacoma and Albuquerque were named PCL co-champions.

=== 1979 Tacoma Tugs and 1980 Tacoma Tigers ===
Following an affiliation change to the Cleveland Indians, a local contest was held and long-time Tacoma resident, Gary Grip won with his entry, the Tacoma Tugs. Grip drew his inspiration for the name from the many tugboats in the Tacoma waters. The franchise was renamed the Tacoma Tugs, marking the first time the team's nickname did not align with its major league club. After one season as the Tugs, the team returned to the Tigers nickname in 1980.

The team finished with nearly identical records in both years as a Cleveland affiliate, going 74–73 in 1979, and 74–74 in 1980.

=== 1981–1994: Tacoma Tigers ===
Following their brief stints with the Yankees and Indians, the team changed their affiliation to the Oakland A's, a partnership that lasted fourteen seasons.

While the affiliation with Oakland provided five playoffs appearances for Tacoma fans, it produced no league champions. Future American League Rookies of the Year Walt Weiss, Jose Canseco, and Mark McGwire all played in Tacoma during this period. Scott Brosius, Tacoma's future hitting coach, also played for Tacoma during the Oakland era.

=== 1995–present: Tacoma Rainiers ===
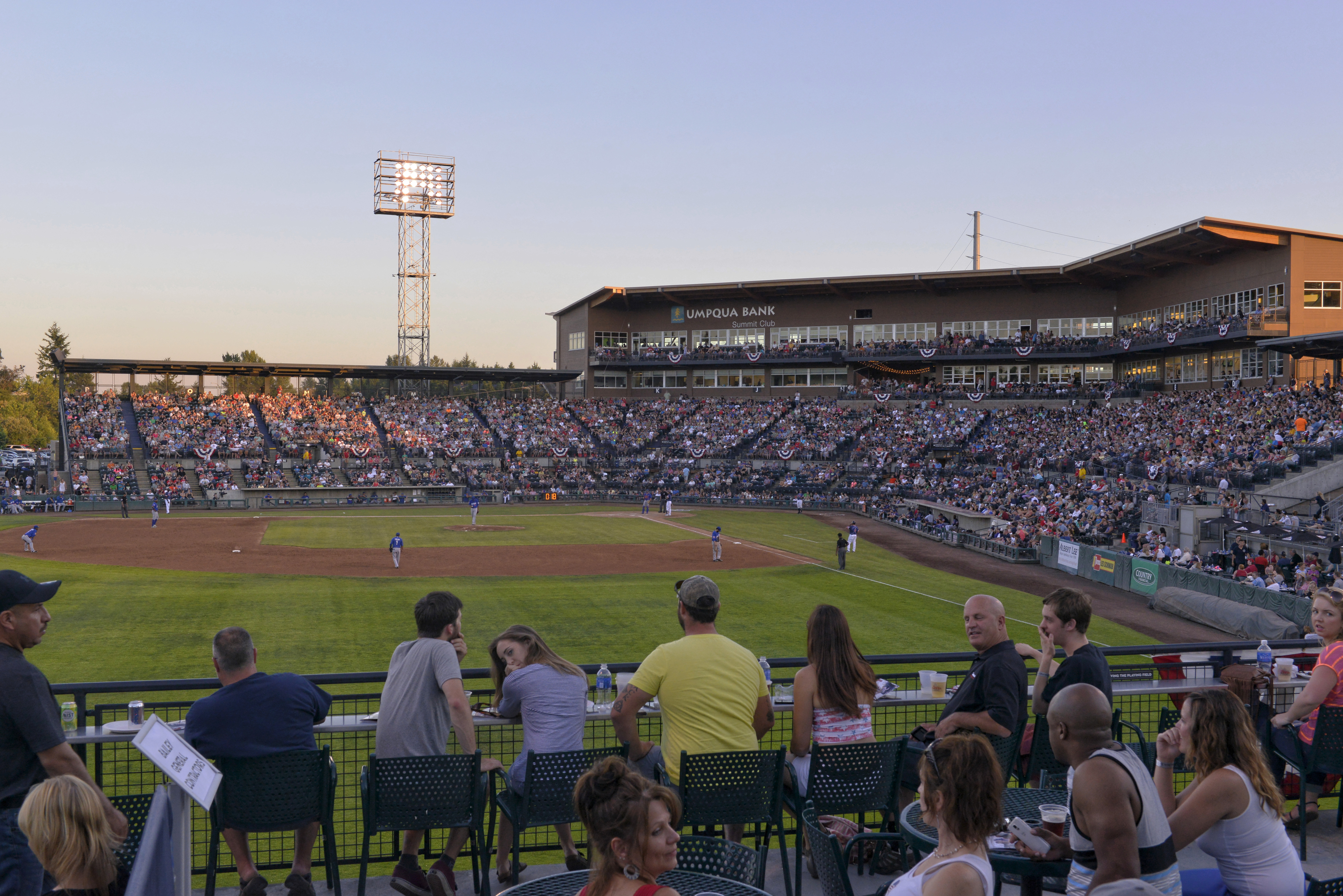
A packed Cheney Stadium on July 3, 2015

The team affiliated with the nearby Seattle Mariners in 1995, whose Triple-A team for the previous ten seasons had been the Calgary Cannons. On November 3, 1994, Tacoma adopted the Rainiers name in part as a tribute to the Seattle Rainiers minor league teams that played from 1938 to 1964 in the PCL and again from 1972 to 1976 in the Northwest League (NWL).

Since their affiliation began with the Mariners in 1995, nearly all of the organization's homegrown prospects have passed through Tacoma, including Alex Rodriguez, Raúl Ibañez, Félix Hernández, J. J. Putz, Kyle Seager, Ken Griffey Jr. (on rehab assignments), and more.

Tacoma was managed by Dan Rohn from 2001 to 2005, a three-time PCL Manager of the Year Award recipient. Under Rohn's direction, the Rainiers compiled a 375–340 (.524) record.

The Tacoma Rainiers shared the 2001 PCL championship with New Orleans after the September 11 attacks forced the cancellation of the championship series. The Rainiers advanced to the championship series in 2005 but were swept by the Nashville Sounds. The Tacoma Rainiers won its second PCL championship in 2010.

The Rainiers are broadcast on KIXI 880 AM with radio play-by-play also streamed online. Rylee Pay became the team's play-by-play announcer in 2025, making her the first female lead broadcaster in Triple-A baseball, and replacing Mike Curto, who had been with the team since 1999 and retired in 2024. The team had an internet-only radio broadcast from 2021 to 2023 and previously was broadcast on KHHO 850 AM.

In conjunction with Major League Baseball's restructuring of Minor League Baseball in 2021, the Rainiers were organized into the Triple-A West. Tacoma ended the season as champions of the Western Division by finishing in first place with a 73–47 record. No playoffs were held to determine a league champion; instead the Rainiers also won the Triple-A West championship by having the best regular-season record among all 10 teams. However, 10 games that had been postponed from the start of the season were reinserted into the schedule as a postseason tournament called the Triple-A Final Stretch, in which all 30 Triple-A clubs competed for the highest winning percentage. Tacoma finished the tournament tied for 13th place with a 5–5 record. José Marmolejos won the Triple-A West MVP award that season.

In 2022, Triple-A West was renamed as the Pacific Coast League, the name historically used by the regional circuit prior to 2021.

The Rainiers set a new PCL record in 2024 with 286 stolen bases, surpassing the 1981 Albuquerque Dukes' 281 steals.

== Season-by-season records ==
Key
League	The team's final position in the league standings
Division	The team's final position in the divisional standings
GB	Games behind the team that finished in first place in the division that season
‡	Class champions (1960–present)
†	League champions (1960–present)
§	Conference champions (1998–2020)
*	Division champions (1963–2022)
^	Postseason berth (1978–present)

Season-by-season records
Season	League	Regular-season					Postseason			MLB affiliate	Ref.
Season	League	Record	Win %	League	Division	GB	Record	Win %	Result	MLB affiliate	Ref.
1960	PCL	81–73	.526	2nd	—	11 1/2	—	—	Result	—	San Francisco Giants
1961 †	PCL	97–57	.630	1st	—	—	—	—	Won PCL championship	San Francisco Giants	
1962	PCL	81–73	.526	2nd (tie)	—	12	—	—	—	San Francisco Giants	
1963	PCL	79–79	.500	5th (tie)	3rd	19	—	—	—	San Francisco Giants	
1964	PCL	73–82	.471	9th	5th	16 1/2	—	—	—	San Francisco Giants	
1965	PCL	75–72	.510	6th (tie)	4th (tie)	5 1/2	—	—	—	San Francisco Giants	
1966	PCL	63–85	.426	11th	6th	20	—	—	—	Chicago Cubs	
1967	PCL	73–75	.493	8th	4th	7	—	—	—	Chicago Cubs	
1968	PCL	65–83	.439	10th	5th	21 1/2	—	—	—	Chicago Cubs	
1969 * †	PCL	86–60	.589	2nd	1st	—	3–2	.600	Won Northern Division title Won PCL championship vs. Eugene Emeralds, 3–2	Chicago Cubs	
1970	PCL	45–98	.315	7th	4th	47 1/2	—	—	—	Chicago Cubs	
1971 *	PCL	78–65	.545	1st	1st	—	1–3	.250	Won Northern Division title Lost PCL championship vs. Salt Lake City Angels, 3–1	Chicago Cubs	
1972	PCL	65–83	.439	6th	3rd	14	—	—	—	Minnesota Twins	
1973	PCL	65–79	.451	6th	3rd	16	—	—	—	Minnesota Twins	
1974	PCL	75–66	.532	3rd	2nd	2 1/2	—	—	—	Minnesota Twins	
1975	PCL	73–69	.514	3rd	2nd	14	—	—	—	Minnesota Twins	
1976	PCL	76–79	.524	4th	2nd	1	—	—	—	Minnesota Twins	
1977	PCL	68–75	.476	5th	3rd	9 1/2	—	—	—	Minnesota Twins	
1978 * †	PCL	80–57	.584	1st	1st	—	2–2	.500	Won Western Division title Tied semifinals vs. Portland Beavers, 2–2; Declared PCL co-champions with Albuquerque Dukes	New York Yankees	
1979	PCL	74–73	.503	4th	2nd	5	—	—	—	Cleveland Indians	
1980	PCL	74–74	.500	6th	3rd	9 1/2	—	—	—	Cleveland Indians	
1981^ *	PCL	78–61	.561	2nd	1st	—	2–4	.333	Won Second Half Northern Division title Won Northern Division title vs. Hawaii Islanders, 2–1; Lost PCL championship vs. Albuquerque Dukes, 3–0	Oakland Athletics	
1982^	PCL	84–59	.587	2nd	1st	—	1–2	.333	Won First Half Northern Division title Lost Northern Division title vs. Spokane Indians, 2–1	Oakland Athletics	
1983	PCL	65–77	.458	8th	4th	10	—	—	—	Oakland Athletics	
1984	PCL	69–71	.493	5th (tie)	3rd	5	—	—	—	Oakland Athletics	
1985	PCL	66–76	.465	7th (tie)	4th (tie)	12 1/2	—	—	—	Oakland Athletics	
1986^	PCL	72–72	.500	4th	2nd	16	0–3	.000	Lost Northern Division title vs. Vancouver Canadians, 3–0	Oakland Athletics	
1987^	PCL	78–65	.545	2nd	2nd	7	2–3	.400	Won First Half Northern Division title Lost Northern Division title vs. Calgary Cannons, 3–2	Oakland Athletics	
1988	PCL	62–82	.431	10th	5th	—	—	—	—	Oakland Athletics	
1989	PCL	77–66	.538	3rd	1st	—	—	—	—	Oakland Athletics	
1990^	PCL	75–67	.528	4th	2nd	3 1/2	2–3	.400	Won First Half Northern Division title Lost Northern Division title vs. Edmonton Trappers, 3–2	Oakland Athletics	
1991	PCL	63–73	.463	9th	4th	9	—	—	—	Oakland Athletics	
1992	PCL	56–87	.392	10th	5th	26 1/2	—	—	—	Oakland Athletics	
1993	PCL	69–74	.483	7th	5th	18	—	—	—	Oakland Athletics	
1994	PCL	61–81	.430	9th	5th	16	—	—	—	Oakland Athletics	
1995	PCL	68–76	.472	6th (tie)	3rd (tie)	14 1/2	—	—	—	Seattle Mariners	
1996	PCL	69–73	.486	6th (tie)	5th	15	—	—	—	Seattle Mariners	
1997	PCL	75–66	.532	4th	2nd	3 1/2	—	—	—	Seattle Mariners	
1998	PCL	77–67	.535	6th (tie)	2nd	4 1/2	—	—	—	Seattle Mariners	
1999	PCL	69–70	.496	8th	2nd	13 1/2	—	—	—	Seattle Mariners	
2000	PCL	76–67	.531	5th	2nd	14	—	—	—	Seattle Mariners	
2001 * § †	PCL	85–59	.590	1st (tie)	1st	—	3–2	.600	Won Pacific Conference Northern Division title Won Pacific Conference title vs. Sacramento River Cats, 3–2; Declared PCL co-champions with New Orleans Zephyrs	Seattle Mariners	
2002	PCL	65–76	.461	13th	4th	16 1/2	—	—	—	Seattle Mariners	
2003	PCL	66–78	.458	14th	4th	8	—	—	—	Seattle Mariners	
2004	PCL	79–63	.556	3rd	2nd	4	—	—	—	Seattle Mariners	
2005 * §	PCL	80–64	.556	2nd (tie)	1st	—	3–5	.375	Won Pacific Conference Northern Division title Won Pacific Conference title vs. Sacramento River Cats, 3–2; Lost PCL championship vs. Nashville Sounds, 3–0	Seattle Mariners	
2006	PCL	74–70	.514	7th (tie)	3rd	7	—	—	—	Seattle Mariners	
2007	PCL	68–76	.472	12th	3rd	6 1/2	—	—	—	Seattle Mariners	
2008	PCL	80–64	.556	4th	2nd	4	—	—	—	Seattle Mariners	
2009 *	PCL	74–70	.514	6th (tie)	1st (tie)	—	1–3	.250	Won Pacific Conference Northern Division title Lost Pacific Conference title vs. Sacramento River Cats, 3–1	Seattle Mariners	
2010 * § †	PCL	74–69	.517	7th	1st	—	6–3	.667	Won Pacific Conference Northern Division title Won Pacific Conference title vs. Sacramento River Cats, 3–2; Won PCL championship vs. Memphis Redbirds, 3–0; Lost Triple-A championship vs. Columbus Clippers	Seattle Mariners	
2011	PCL	70–74	.486	8th (tie)	2nd	7	—	—	—	Seattle Mariners	
2012	PCL	63–81	.438	5th	4th	18	—	—	—	Seattle Mariners	
2013	PCL	76–68	.528	6th (tie)	2nd	2	—	—	—	Seattle Mariners	
2014	PCL	74–70	.514	7th (tie)	3rd	7	—	—	—	Seattle Mariners	
2015	PCL	68–76	.472	11th	4th	16 1/2	—	—	—	Seattle Mariners	
2016 *	PCL	81–62	.566	3rd	1st	—	1–3	.250	Won Pacific Conference Northern Division title Lost Pacific Conference title vs. El Paso Chihuahuas, 3–1	Seattle Mariners	
2017	PCL	66–76	.465	13th	3rd	14	—	—	—	Seattle Mariners	
2018	PCL	66–73	.475	11th	3rd	16	—	—	—	Seattle Mariners	
2019	PCL	61–78	.439	13th	4th	11 1/2	—	—	—	Seattle Mariners	
2020	PCL	Season cancelled (COVID-19 pandemic)								Seattle Mariners	
2021 †	AAAW	78–52 (Note: In 2021, the team with the best record at the end of the regular-season was declared the Triple-A West champion. Tacoma had a 73–47 (.601) record, which put them 1st in the league and made them the AAAW champion. The regular-season was followed by the Triple-A Final Stretch, a 10-game postseason tournament in which all 30 Triple-A clubs competed for the highest winning percentage. Tacoma finished the tournament tied for 13th place with a 5–5 (.500) record.)	.600	1st	1st	—	—	—	Won AAAW championship	Seattle Mariners	
2022	PCL	72–78	.480	6th	2nd	14	—	—	—	Seattle Mariners	
2023	PCL	77–73	.513	4th	2nd	11	—	—	—	Seattle Mariners	
2024	PCL	82–68	.547	2nd	1st	—	—	—	—	Seattle Mariners	
2025^	PCL	86–64	.573	1st	1st	—	0–2	.000	Won second-half title Lost PCL championship vs. Las Vegas Aviators, 2–0	Seattle Mariners	
2026	PCL	72–78	.480	7th	3rd	16	—	—	—	Seattle Mariners	
Totals	—	4,792–4,747	.502	—	—	—	27–40	.403	—	—	—

=== Postseason history ===
==== 1961 Tacoma Giants ====
The 1961 Tacoma Giants finished the season with a record of 97–57 (.630), which still stands as the best season in the club's PCL history. No playoffs were held in 1961; instead, the Giants clinched the league championship by earning the top spot in the league's sole, eight-team division. The club finished the season going 57–10 over their final 67 games, including a 16-game winning streak.

==== 1969 Tacoma Cubs ====
The 1969 Tacoma Cubs finished the season with an 86–60 (.589) record, and earned the franchise's second league championship. The Cubs won the four-team Northern Division by 14 games to advance to the league championship. After going down 0–2 in the championship series to Eugene, then a Philadelphia Phillies affiliate, the Cubs rallied to win three straight games, clinching the five-game series. Cubs pitcher Archie Reynolds fired a complete game, two-hit shutout in game four to force a deciding fifth game. The 1969 Cubs were the first Tacoma team to win a championship playoff series.

==== 1971 Tacoma Cubs ====
The Tacoma Cubs compiled a record of 78–65 (.545) and returned to the PCL championship series just two short years after winning the league title. This time, the Cubs would fall to the Salt Lake Angels, three games to one. After falling behind 0–1 in the series, Cubs starting pitcher Jim Colborn fired a 10-inning, complete-game winning effort in game two, surrendering only one run and evening the series. Tacoma played the series without Adrian Garrett, who had hit a franchise record 43 home runs during the regular season before being sold to Oakland on August 31.

==== 1978 Tacoma Yankees ====
Tacoma finished with a record of 80–57 (.584) during their only season as a Yankees affiliate and was declared PCL co-champions, along with Albuquerque, after inclement weather in the Pacific Northwest forced the league office to cancel the playoffs.

==== 1981 Tacoma Tigers ====
For the first time since the PCL switched to a split-season format, Tacoma made the playoffs after finishing 43–27 in the second half to win the Northern Division. The Tigers defeated Hawaii, winners of the first half, two games to one to advance to the PCL championship series against Albuquerque. The Dukes would go on to sweep the Tigers 3–0 by a combined score of 22–7 to win the PCL championship.

==== 2001 Tacoma Rainiers ====
While the Seattle Mariners compiled a major league record 116 wins, the Rainiers put together an 85–59 (.590) record to win the Northern Division by 12 1/2 games. The 2001 Rainiers led the Pacific Coast League with a 3.74 team ERA, while the offense finished fifth in the league in runs scored. Tacoma defeated Sacramento 3–2, after falling behind in the Pacific Conference series 2–1, to move on to the championship series. Tacoma and New Orleans were scheduled to begin the series on September 11, before it was cancelled in the aftermath of the September 11 terrorist attacks. The league office announced that Tacoma and New Orleans would be declared co-champions of the 2001 season.

==== 2005 Tacoma Rainiers ====
The 2005 Rainiers finished 80–64 (.556) under the guidance of manager Dan Rohn. The Rainiers clinched the Pacific Conference Northern Division crown on the second-to-last day of the season, eliminating a Salt Lake team that had won their final nine games of the season. Tacoma dropped the first two games of the five-game Pacific Conference series at home against Sacramento, before taking the final three games at Raley Field to advance to the championship. After falling behind 0–1 in the series to Nashville, a season-high five errors in game two sunk the Rainiers and gave the Sounds a 2–0 series advantage. In the 13th inning of game three, eventual series MVP Nelson Cruz launched a three-run home run to give Nashville a 5–2 victory and the PCL championship.

==== 2009 Tacoma Rainiers ====
The 2009 Rainiers, guided by manager Daren Brown, worked a record of 74–70 to sneak into the postseason. Tacoma was quickly eliminated from championship contention after dropping the conference series to Sacramento, 3–1.

==== 2010 Tacoma Rainiers ====
The Rainiers went into playoffs with its home ballpark, Cheney Stadium, under construction. Displaced from its home field, the Rainiers had to play its playoff home games at other venues. The first round of playoff games against the Sacramento Rivercats saw the Rainiers winning two straight on the road, then coming "home" to Safeco Field, the Mariners' home ballpark. The Rainiers then dropped two straight games at Safeco, before winning Game 5 to advance to the PCL championship series against the Memphis Redbirds.

Due to Safeco Field not being available for the championship series and no other ballpark in the Pacific Northwest meeting PCL requirements, the Rainiers were forced to play all games in the PCL finals on the road. For Games 1 and 2, the Rainiers played as the home team, batting second against the Memphis Redbirds, with AutoZone Park in Memphis, Tennessee, (the Redbirds' home park) hosting all the games. Despite playing all its games in its opponents home park, the Rainiers swept the Redbirds in three games to win the 2010 PCL championship.

The Columbus Clippers defeated the Rainiers, 12–6, on September 21, 2010, to win the Triple-A Baseball National Championship Game in Oklahoma City.

== Uniforms ==
In March 2015, the Tacoma Rainiers announced a set of new logo marks and additions to the club's uniform set. An updated version of the team's script logo, introduced in 1995, became the club's primary logo mark. A long-standing fan-favorite, the standalone "R" logo, became the team's secondary mark.

In addition to the logo marks, a new look was given to the club's home alternate, away, and batting practice uniforms. A red alternate jersey, worn with a new red hat, was added to the rotation of uniform sets. The club's new road uniform was modeled after the Tacoma Giants uniforms of the 1960s with a gray color scheme and block letters on the front. The final addition to the uniform set was a new batting practice cap, adorned with a mountain outline and a climbing axe with a baseball bat handle.

== Roster ==
Tacoma Rainiers roster
Players	Coaches/Other
Pitchers: 58 Peyton Alford; 20 Charlie Beilenson; 39 Cooper Criswell * #; 31 Jhonathan Diaz *; 38 Dane Dunning; 18 Scott Effross; 12 Carson Fulmer; 46 Nick Garcia; 6 Domingo González; 47 Nick Hull ~; 49 Nolan Kingham *; 21 Gabe Mosser ~; 13 Robinson Ortiz *; 19 Houston Roth; 33 Seth Shuman; 37 Josh Simpson *; 59 Troy Taylor *; 10 Reid VanScoter; 61 Carlos Vargas * #; 35 Troy Watson *; 25 Simeon Woods Richardson * ~; Catchers: 9 Jake Harvey ~; 44 Willie MacIver *; 36 Nick Raposo; 27 Jakson Reetz ~; Infielders: 40 Ryan Bliss *; 6 Stuart Fairchild *; 33 Brendan Donovan * #; -- Josh Hood; 8 Andy Ibanez *; 23 Connor Joe *; 1 Miles Mastrobuoni *; 35 Axel Sanchez; 35 Patrick Wisdom *; Outfielders: 9 Connor Joe *; 41 Nolan Jones; 4 Victor Labrada; 9 Spencer Packard	Manager: 7 John Russell; Coaches: 17 Mike McCarthy (pitching); 5 Eric Farris (bench); 60 Seth Mejias-Brean (hitting); 28 Jacob Nottingham (coach); 60-day injured list: 63 Austin Kitchen (full season); 7-day injured list; * On Seattle Mariners 40-man roster; ~ Development list; # Rehab assignment; ∞ Reserve list; ‡ Restricted list; § Suspended list; † Temporarily inactive list; Roster updated September 19, 2026; Transactions; → More rosters: MiLB • Pacific Coast League; → Seattle Mariners minor league players
