= 2024 Detroit Tigers season =

Major League Baseball season

2024 Detroit Tigers
- American League Wild Card winners
- League: American League
- Division: Central
- Ballpark: Comerica Park
- City: Detroit, Michigan
- Record: 86–76 (.531)
- Divisional place: 3rd
- Owners: Christopher Ilitch; Ilitch family trust
- President of baseball operations: Scott Harris
- General managers: Jeff Greenberg
- Managers: A. J. Hinch
- Television: Bally Sports Detroit; Jason Benetti/Dan Dickerson (play-by-play); Craig Monroe/Dan Petry/Kirk Gibson/Todd Jones/Carlos Peña/Andy Dirks/Alex Avila (color commentary); John Keating/Mickey York/Trevor Thompson/Johnny Kane/Natalie Kerwin/Dannie Rogers (host/reporters)
- Radio: Detroit Tigers Radio Network; Dan Dickerson/Greg Gania (play-by-play); Bobby Scales/Andy Dirks (color commentary); Daniella Bruce (field reporter)
- Stats: ESPN.com; Baseball Reference

The 2024 Detroit Tigers season was the team's 124th season and its 25th at Comerica Park. This was the Tigers' fourth season under manager A. J. Hinch. The team opened their season on the road on March 28 against their divisional rivals the Chicago White Sox and concluded the regular season on September 29 at home also against the White Sox.

In mid-August, the Tigers’ playoff odds were down to 0.2 percent (per FanGraphs) and they were 10 games out of a playoff spot. From August 11 onward, the Tigers surged with a 31–13 record down the stretch. They clinched their first winning season since 2016 with a win over the Baltimore Orioles on September 22. On September 27, they clinched their first playoff appearance since 2014, ending the longest current playoff drought in MLB, which was tied with the Los Angeles Angels, with a 4–1 win over the White Sox (which was also notable for it giving the White Sox a modern record 121 losses to their season). They swept the Houston Astros in the American League Wild Card Series, which was the team that Hinch formerly managed. But the Tigers' run ended when they lost the American League Division Series to their division rival Cleveland Guardians in five games.

On August 3, the Tigers retired #10 for former manager Jim Leyland, who led the team from 2006 to 2013, including American League Championships in 2006 and 2012.

After the season, team ace Tarik Skubal would win his first of two AL Cy Young awards with the Tigers.

== Announcer changes ==
On November 9, 2023, Jason Benetti was hired by the Tigers to be the new play-by-play TV broadcaster. Craig Monroe was originally the primary color commentator, with occasional fill-ins by Dan Petry, Kirk Gibson, Todd Jones, and the new hire of Carlos Peña. Monroe was indefinitely suspended from both TV and radio on July 1 after he was accused of alleged sex crimes in Florida against a minor that started in 2001.

On the radio side, play-by-play man Dan Dickerson returned for his 25th season. He was honored for this career landmark at the Tigers home game on April 27 where the first 15,000 fans who arrived were given a free bobblehead in his likeness and he was presented with a vintage 1935 radio during the game and the team donated $25,000 to charity of his choice. He also fills in on TV when Benetti is on assignment for Fox Sports. Greg Gania fills in when Dickerson is on TV. Bobby Scales does color commentary for half of Tigers home games and all road games. Andy Dirks instead does color on half of Tigers home games and Daniella Bruce does field reports.

== Roster moves ==
=== Coaching staff ===
- On December 5, 2023, the Tigers announced the following coaching changes: third base coach Gary Jones was moved to the bench as a major league coach, Joey Cora was hired to replace Jones as third base coach, Lance Zawadzki was hired as an assistant hitting coach, Anthony Iapoce was moved to first base coach after managing the Toledo Mud Hens in 2023, and Ryan Sienko was moved to catching coach after working for the Vice President of player development in 2023.

=== Trades ===
- On November 4, 2023, the Tigers acquired outfielder Mark Canha from the Milwaukee Brewers in exchange for minor-league pitcher Blake Holub.
- On January 22, 2024, the Tigers traded infielder Tyler Nevin to the Baltimore Orioles for cash considerations.
- On February 7, 2024, the Tigers traded utility player Nick Maton to the Baltimore Orioles for cash considerations.
- On March 4, 2024, the Tigers traded infielder Andre Lipcius to the Los Angeles Dodgers for cash considerations.
- On June 7, 2024, the Tigers traded infielder Buddy Kennedy to the Philadelphia Phillies for cash considerations.
- On July 6, 2024, the Tigers traded pitcher Trey Wingenter to the Boston Red Sox for minor league pitcher CJ Weins.
- On July 29, 2024, the Tigers traded catcher Carson Kelly to the Texas Rangers for minor-league catcher Liam Hicks and pitcher Tyler Owens.
- On July 29, 2024, the Tigers acquired pitcher Ricky Vanasco from the Los Angeles Dodgers for cash considerations and assigned him to Toledo.
- On July 30, 2024, the Tigers traded pitcher Andrew Chafin to the Texas Rangers for minor-league pitchers Joseph Montalvo and Chase Lee.
- On July 30, 2024, the Tigers traded infielder Mark Canha to the San Francisco Giants for minor-league pitcher Eric Silva.
- On July 30, 2024, the Tigers traded pitcher Jack Flaherty to the Los Angeles Dodgers for minor league catcher Thayron Liranzo and shortstop Trey Sweeney.

=== Releases ===
- On October 2, 2023, pitcher Zach Logue elected free agency. On December 8, 2023, he signed a minor league contract with the Atlanta Braves.
- On November 2, 2023, pitchers Mathew Boyd and José Cisnero became free agents, Cisnero via election and Boyd via the end of his contract. On February 3, 2024, Cisnero signed a one-year $1.75 million contract with the Los Angeles Angels. On June 29, 2024, Boyd signed a one-year major league contract with the Cleveland Guardians and was placed on the 15-day injured list while he recovered from elbow surgery.
- On November 3, 2023, the Tigers declined the option for designated hitter Miguel Cabrera, making him a free agent. He was expected to retire. After his retirement became official, it was announced that Cabrera would remain with the Tigers as a special assistant to the president of baseball operations.
- On November 5, 2023, pitcher Eduardo Rodríguez opted out of the final four years of his contract with the Tigers and became a free agent. On December 8, 2023, he signed a four-year, $80 million contract with the Arizona Diamondbacks.
- On November 6, 2023, the Tigers placed infielder Zack Short, pitchers Andrew Vasquez and Trey Wingenter on waivers. Short was claimed by the New York Mets. Vasquez and Wingenter cleared waivers and were outrighted to Triple-A Toledo Mud Hens. Both Vasquez and Wingenter refused assignment and became free agents. Wingenter resigned a minor league contract with the Tigers on December 12, 2023. Vasquez resigned a minor league contract with the Tigers on January 4, 2024.
- On November 6, 2023, minor league pitchers Braden Bristo, Sam Clay, Angel De Jesus and Rony Garcia elected free agency. On April 23, 2024, Bristo announced his retirement. On May 26, 2024, Clay signed a contract with Olmecas de Tabasco of the Mexican League.
- On November 6, 2023, minor league catchers Mario Feliciano and Michael Papierski along with minor league infielder Nick Solak elected free agency. On January 22, 2024, Papierski signed a minor league contract with the Seattle Mariners. On February 6, 2024, Solak also signed a minor league contract with the Mariners.
- On November 6, 2023, the Tigers designated pitcher Tyler Alexander for assignment. Alexander was claimed off waivers by the Tampa Bay Rays four days later.
- On November 14, 2023, the Tigers designated pitchers Brenan Hanifee and Freddy Pacheco for assignment. Both players elected free agency and resigned to a minor league contract.
- On November 17, 2023, the Tigers did not tender contracts to pitchers Garrett Hill, Spencer Turnbull, Freddy Pecheco and Brenan Hanifee as well as outfielder Austin Meadows making them free agents. Pecheco and Hanifee had been designated for assignment three days earlier. Hill was resigned to a minor league contract four days later. Hanifee resigned a minor league contract with the Tigers on December 8, 2023. Pacheco resigned a minor league contract with the Tigers on December 18, 2023 On February 14, 2024, Turnbull signed a one-year $2 Million contract with the Philadelphia Phillies.
- On December 22, 2023, the Tigers designated catcher Donny Sands for assignment. On January 5, 2024, Sands was outrighted to Triple-A Toledo Mud Hens. On March 26, 2024, Sands was released by the Tigers organization. On April 11, 2024, Sands signed with Toros de Tijuana of the Mexican League.
- On January 18, 2024, the Tigers designated infielder Tyler Nevin for assignment. He was later traded for cash considerations.
- On February 5, 2024, the Tigers designated infielder Nick Maton for assignment. He was later traded for cash considerations.
- On February 29, 2024, the Tigers designated infielder Andre Lipcius for assignment. He was later traded for cash considerations.
- On March 28, 2024, the Tigers designated pitcher Miguel Díaz for assignment. On April 4, 2024, Díaz was claimed off waivers by the Houston Astros.
- On May 23, 2024, the Tigers designated pitcher Ty Adcock for assignment. On May 23, 2024, Adcock claimed off waivers by the New York Mets.
- On June 3, 2024, the Tigers released infielder Keston Hiura from his minor league contract and designated infielder Buddy Kennedy for assignment. Kennedy was later traded for cash considerations. On June 11, 2024, Hiura signed a minor league contract with the Los Angeles Angels.
- On August 16, 2024, the Tigers designated infielder Gio Urshela and pitcher Easton Lucas for assignment. Lucas was claimed off waivers by the Toronto Blue Jays on August 19. After clearing waivers and being released by the Tigers on August 18, Urshela signed a contract with the Atlanta Braves for the remainder of the season on August 20.
- On August 30, 2024, the Tigers designated pitcher Joey Wentz for assignment. On September 3, 2024, Wentz was claimed off waivers by the Pittsburgh Pirates.
- On September 24, 2024, the Tigers designated pitcher Shelby Miller for assignment. He was released five days later. Miller signed a minor league contract with the Arizona Diamondbacks on February 16, 2025.

=== Signings ===
- On November 6, 2023, the Tigers signed outfielder Bligh Madris to a minor league contract with an invitation to spring training. The Tigers selected Madris's contract and added him to the active roster on July 21, 2024.
- On November 14, 2023, the Tigers purchased the contracts of pitcher Wilmer Flores and catcher Dillon DIngler. Dingler was selected in second round of the 2020 MLB draft while Flores was signed as an undrafted free agent after that same draft.
- On November 21, 2023, the Tigers signed outfielder Ryan Vilade and resign pitcher Garrett Hill to minor league contracts. The Tigers selected Vilade's contract and added him to the active roster on May 7, 2024.
- On November 28, 2023, the Tigers signed pitcher Kenta Maeda to a two-year, $24 million contract.
- On December 8, 2023, the Tigers signed catcher Anthony Benboom and resigned pitcher Brenan Hanifee to minor league contracts.
- On December 12, 2023, the Tigers signed pitcher Andrew Chafin to a one-year, $4.25 million contract with a $6.5 million option for 2025.
- On December 12, 2023, the Tigers resigned pitcher Trey Wingenter to a minor league contract. He was later traded for minor league pitcher CJ Weins.
- On December 18, 2023, the Tigers resigned pitcher Freddy Pacheco to a minor league contract.
- On December 18, 2023, the Tigers signed pitcher Jack Flaherty to a one-year, $14 million contract.
- On December 22, 2023, the Tigers signed pitcher Shelby Miller to a one-year, $3 million contract.
- On January 4, 2024, the Tigers resigned pitcher Andrew Vasquez to a minor league contract.
- On January 18, 2024, the Tigers claimed pitcher Devin Sweet off waiver from the San Francisco Giants. He was then designated for assignment on January 29, 2024. Sweet cleared waivers and was sent outright to the Toledo Mud Hens on February 5, 2024.
- On January 29, 2024, the Tigers purchased the contract of infielder Colt Keith, a 2020 fifth-round draft pick, after signing him to a six-year contract extension worth at least $28.6 million.
- On February 5, 2024, the Tigers claimed pitcher Kolton Ingram off waivers from the Los Angeles Angels. He was designated for assignment on February 20, 2024. On February 25, 2024, Ingram was claimed off waivers by the New York Mets.
- On February 12, 2024, the Tigers signed infielder Keston Hiura to a minor league contract. He was released on June 3, 2024.
- On February 20, 2024, the Tigers claimed outfielder TJ Hopkins off waivers from the San Francisco Giants. He was designated for assignment two days later. On February 25, 2024, Hopkins cleared waivers and was sent outright to the Toledo Mud Hens on February 25, 2024.
- On February 22, 2024, the Tigers signed infielder Gio Urshela to a one-year $1.5 million contract.
- On February 29, 2024, the Tigers claimed infielder Buddy Kennedy off waivers from the St. Louis Cardinals. Kennedy was optioned to Toledo on March 14, 2024.
- On April 15, 2024, the Tigers claimed pitcher Ty Adcock off waivers from the Seattle Mariners and optioned him to Toledo. Adcock was designated for assignment on May 18, 2024.
- On May 18, 2024, the Tigers claimed pitcher Easton Lucas off waivers from the Oakland Athletics and optioned him to Toledo.
- On June 10, 2024, the Tigers resigned pitcher Miguel Díaz to a minor league contract after losing him to a waiver claim in April.
- On June 17, 2024, the Tigers signed pitcher Eli Villalobos to a minor league contract and assigned him to Toledo.
- On June 27, 2024, the Tigers signed infielder Drew Maggi to a minor league contract and assigned him to Toledo.
- On July 29, 2024, the Tigers purchased the contract of pitcher Bryan Sammons, he was signed to a minor-league contract in 2023.
- On August 1, 2024, the Tigers purchased the contracts of pitchers Sean Guenther and Brenan Hanifee. Guenther was claimed off waivers by the Tigers in 2022 and Hanifee resigned a minor-league contract in 2023.
- On August 4, 2024, the Tigers purchased the contract of pitcher Brant Hurter, a 2021 seventh-round draft pick.
- On August 16, 2024, the Tigers purchased the contracts of two infielders: Trey Sweeney, who was recently acquired in a trade, and Jace Jung, a 2022 first-round draft pick.
- On August 23, 2024, the Tigers signed outfielder Óscar Mercado to a minor league contract and assigned him to Toledo.
- On September 18, 2024, the Tigers signed catcher Tomás Nido to a minor league contract and assigned him to Toledo.
- On September 24, 2024, the Tigers purchased the contract of pitcher Jackson Jobe, a 2021 first-round draft pick.

== Season standings ==
=== American League Central ===
AL Central
Team	W	L	Pct.	GB	Home	Road
Cleveland Guardians	92	69	.571	—	50‍–‍30	42‍–‍39
Kansas City Royals	86	76	.531	6½	45‍–‍36	41‍–‍40
Detroit Tigers	86	76	.531	6½	43‍–‍38	43‍–‍38
Minnesota Twins	82	80	.506	10½	43‍–‍38	39‍–‍42
Chicago White Sox	41	121	.253	51½	23‍–‍58	18‍–‍63

=== American League Wildcard ===
Division leaders
Team	W	L	Pct.
New York Yankees	94	68	.580
Cleveland Guardians	92	69	.571
Houston Astros	88	73	.547

Wild Card teams (Top 3 teams qualify for postseason)
Team	W	L	Pct.	GB
Baltimore Orioles	91	71	.562	+5
Kansas City Royals	86	76	.531	—
Detroit Tigers	86	76	.531	—
Seattle Mariners	85	77	.525	1
Minnesota Twins	82	80	.506	4
Boston Red Sox	81	81	.500	5
Tampa Bay Rays	80	82	.494	6
Texas Rangers	78	84	.481	8
Toronto Blue Jays	74	88	.457	12
Oakland Athletics	69	93	.426	17
Los Angeles Angels	63	99	.389	23
Chicago White Sox	41	121	.253	45

=== Record vs. opponents ===
==== Record vs. American League ====
2024 American League record Source: MLB Standings Grid – 2024
Team	BAL	BOS	CWS	CLE	DET	HOU	KC	LAA	MIN	NYY	OAK	SEA	TB	TEX	TOR	NL
Baltimore	—	8–5	6–1	3–4	2–4	2–5	4–2	4–2	6–0	8–5	3–3	4–2	9–4	5–2	7–6	20–26
Boston	5–8	—	4–3	2–5	3–4	2–4	4–2	4–2	3–3	6–7	5–1	4–3	6–7	4–2	8–5	21–25
Chicago	1–6	3–4	—	5–8	3–10	2–4	1–12	4–2	1–12	1–5	3–3	1–6	4–2	0–7	1–5	11–35
Cleveland	4–3	5–2	8–5	—	7–6	1–4	5–8	5–1	10–3	2–4	6–1	4–2	3–4	4–2	4–2	24–22
Detroit	4–2	4–3	10–3	6–7	—	2–4	6–7	3–4	6–7	2–4	3–3	5–1	5–1	3–4	5–2	22–24
Houston	5–2	4–2	4–2	4–1	4–2	—	4–3	9–4	2–4	1–6	8–5	5–8	4–2	7–6	5–2	22–24
Kansas City	2–4	2–4	12–1	8–5	7–6	3–4	—	5–2	6–7	2–5	4–2	3–3	3–3	1–5	5–2	23–23
Los Angeles	2–4	2–4	2–4	1–5	4–3	4–9	2–5	—	1–5	3–3	5–8	8–5	3–4	4–9	0–7	22–24
Minnesota	0–6	3–3	12–1	3–10	7–6	4–2	7–6	5–1	—	0–6	6–1	5–2	3–4	5–2	4–2	18–28
New York	5–8	7–6	5–1	4–2	4–2	6–1	5–2	3–3	6–0	—	5–2	4–3	7–6	3–3	7–6	23–23
Oakland	3–3	1–5	3–3	1–6	3–3	5–8	2–4	8–5	1–6	2–5	—	4–9	3–4	6–7	3–3	24–22
Seattle	2–4	3–4	6–1	2–4	1–5	8–5	3–3	5–8	2–5	3–4	9–4	—	3–3	10–3	2–4	26–20
Tampa Bay	4–9	7–6	2–4	4–3	1–5	2–4	3–3	4–3	4–3	6–7	4–3	3–3	—	1–5	9–4	26–20
Texas	2–5	2–4	7–0	2–4	4–3	6–7	5–1	9–4	2–5	3–3	7–6	3–10	5–1	—	2–4	19–27
Toronto	6–7	5–8	5–1	2–4	2–5	2–5	2–5	7–0	2–4	6–7	3–3	4–2	4–9	4–2	—	20–26

Updated with the results of all games through September 30, 2024.

==== Record vs. National League ====
2024 American League record vs. National League Source: MLB Standings
Team	AZ	ATL	CHC	CIN	COL	LAD	MIA	MIL	NYM	PHI	PIT	SD	SF	STL	WSH
Baltimore	2–1	2–1	0–3	3–0	2–1	1–2	1–2	1–2	1–2	2–1	1–2	1–2	1–2	0–3	2–2
Boston	0–3	1–3	2–1	2–1	1–2	0–3	3–0	1–2	0–3	2–1	3–0	1–2	2–1	1–2	2–1
Chicago	1–2	2–1	0–4	0–3	2–1	0–3	1–2	0–3	0–3	0–3	0–3	0–3	1–2	2–1	2–1
Cleveland	0–3	1–2	3–0	3–1	1–2	1–2	2–1	0–3	3–0	2–1	2–1	1–2	2–1	1–2	2–1
Detroit	2–1	0–3	1–2	3–0	2–1	2–1	1–2	1–2	2–1	1–2	2–2	1–2	1–2	2–1	1–2
Houston	2–1	0–3	0–3	0–3	4–0	2–1	3–0	2–1	2–1	1–2	1–2	1–2	1–2	2–1	1–2
Kansas City	1–2	1–2	1–2	3–0	1–2	1–2	2–1	2–1	1–2	1–2	2–1	1–2	0–3	3–1	3–0
Los Angeles	1–2	1–2	1–2	0–3	1–2	2–2	3–0	1–2	2–1	1–2	2–1	3–0	2–1	1–2	1–2
Minnesota	2–1	0–3	1–2	1–2	2–1	1–2	1–2	1–3	1–2	2–1	1–2	1–2	1–2	1–2	2–1
New York	2–1	1–2	2–1	0–3	2–1	1–2	2–1	2–1	0–4	3–0	1–2	2–1	3–0	1–2	1–2
Oakland	1–2	1–2	2–1	2–1	2–1	1–2	2–1	1–2	2–1	2–1	3–0	0–3	2–2	1–2	2–1
Seattle	2–1	2–1	1–2	3–0	2–1	0–3	1–2	1–2	3–0	2–1	1–2	3–1	2–1	2–1	1–2
Tampa Bay	3–0	1–2	2–1	2–1	2–1	1–2	3–1	1–2	3–0	0–3	2–1	1–2	2–1	1–2	2–1
Texas	2–2	1–2	2–1	2–1	0–3	2–1	2–1	0–3	1–2	0–3	2–1	1–2	1–2	1–2	2–1
Toronto	1–2	1–2	1–2	1–2	2–1	1–2	0–3	1–2	1–2	1–3	2–1	2–1	2–1	3–0	1–2

Updated with the results of all games through September 30, 2024.

== Season highlights ==
=== Pitching ===
- On May 30 against the Boston Red Sox, Jack Flaherty took a no-hitter into the seventh inning before it was broken up when Rob Refsnyder hit a single into left field.
- On July 7 against the Cincinnati Reds, Tarik Skubal recorded a career-high 13 strikeouts with zero walks and only allowed one run, the first Tiger to do so since Mickey Lolich. Skubal was selected for the All Star Game later that day, along with outfielder Riley Greene.
- On September 10 against the Colorado Rockies, Keider Montero threw a complete game, becoming the first Tigers pitcher to throw a complete game since Spencer Turnbull on May 18, 2021, and the first to face the minimum 27 batters in a complete game since Justin Verlander on May 7, 2011.
- On September 13 against the Baltimore Orioles, Brant Hurter and Beau Brieske combined for seven perfect innings before a walk by Adley Rutschman. Brenan Hanifee kept the no-hitter going through the eighth inning until Tyler Holton allowed a triple to Gunnar Henderson in the final inning.
- With 18 wins, a 2.39 ERA and 228 strikeouts, Tarik Skubal became the first pitcher to win the Triple Crown since Shane Bieber in the COVID-19 shortened 2020 season. Skubal is the first pitcher to earn the Triple Crown in a full season since 2011, when both Justin Verlander (AL) and Clayton Kershaw (NL) claimed the honor.

=== Team accomplishments ===
- The Tigers swept the season-opening three-game series against the Chicago White Sox, winning each game by one run. It is the first time in team history that the Tigers won three one-run decisions to start a season.
- The Tigers became the second team in MLB history to make the playoffs after being eight or more games below .500 in August, and the first since the 1973 National League Champion Mets.

== Game log ==
=== Regular season ===
2024 Game Log: 86–76 (Home 43–38, Road 43–38)
March/April: 17–13 (Home 7–9, Road 10–4)

#	Date	Opponent	Score	Win	Loss	Save	Attendance	Record	Streak
1	March 28	@ White Sox	1–0	**Skubal** (1–0)	Crochet (0–1)	**Foley** (1)	33,420	1–0	W1
2	March 30	@ White Sox	7–6 (10)	**Miller** (1–0)	García (0–1)	—	28,176	2–0	W2
3	March 31	@ White Sox	3–2	**Holton** (1–0)	Wilson (0–1)	**Foley** (2)	17,478	3–0	W3
4	April 1	@ Mets	5–0 (10)	**Foley** (1–0)	Tonkin (0–1)	—	16,853	4–0	W4
—	April 2	@ Mets	Postponed (inclement weather). Rescheduled to April 4.						
—	April 3	@ Mets	Postponed (inclement weather). Rescheduled to April 4.						
5	April 4	@ Mets	6–3 (11)	**Miller** (2–0)	Tonkin (0–2)	—	15,020	5–0	W5
6	April 4	@ Mets	1–2	Garrett (1–0)	**Faedo** (0–1)	—	15,020	5–1	L1
7	April 5	Athletics	5–4	**Foley** (2–0)	Erceg (0–1)	**Lange** (1)	44,711	6–1	W1
8	April 6	Athletics	0–4	Blackburn (1–0)	**Maeda** (0–1)	—	27,529	6–2	L1
9	April 7	Athletics	1–7	Boyle (1–1)	**Flaherty** (0–1)	—	15,174	6–3	L2
10	April 8	@ Pirates	4–7	Keller (1–1)	**Olson** (0–1)	—	9,957	6–4	L3
11	April 9	@ Pirates	5–3	**Miller** (3–0)	Bednar (1–1)	**Foley** (3)	10,058	7–4	W1
–	April 11	Twins	Postponed (inclement weather). Rescheduled to April 13.						
12	April 12	Twins	8–2	**Skubal** (2–0)	López (1–2)	—	12,434	8–4	W2
13	April 13	Twins	5–11 (12)	Alcalá (1–0)	**Lange** (0–1)	—	22,548	8–5	L1
14	April 13	Twins	1–4	Woods Richardson (1–0)	**Manning** (0–1)	Sands (1)	22,548	8–6	L2
15	April 14	Twins	4–3	**Vest** (1–0)	Jax (1–1)	**Foley** (4)	17,317	9–6	W1
16	April 15	Rangers	0–1	Lorenzen (1–0)	**Olson** (0–2)	Yates (1)	12,005	9–7	L1
17	April 16	Rangers	4–2	**Chafin** (1–0)	Ureña (0–2)	**Foley** (5)	10,377	10–7	W1
18	April 17	Rangers	4–5	Yates (2–0)	**Miller** (3–1)	—	10,259	10–8	L1
19	April 18	Rangers	7–9	Leclerc (1–2)	**Miller** (3–2)	Yates (2)	11,339	10–9	L2
20	April 19	@ Twins	5–4	**Chafin** (2–0)	Thielbar (0–1)	**Foley** (6)	13,849	11–9	W1
21	April 20	@ Twins	3–4	Ober (1–1)	**Olson** (0–3)	Jax (2)	20,064	11–10	L1
22	April 21	@ Twins	6–1	**Mize** (1–0)	Varland (0–4)	—	17,757	12–10	W1
23	April 22	@ Rays	7–1	**Skubal** (3–0)	Littell (1–1)	—	13,522	13–10	W2
24	April 23	@ Rays	4–2	**Faedo** (1–1)	Poche (0–1)	**Foley** (7)	13,648	14–10	W3
25	April 24	@ Rays	5–7	Devenski (1–1)	**Vest** (1–1)	Cleavinger (2)	13,754	14–11	L1
26	April 26	Royals	0–8	Lugo (4–1)	**Olson** (0–4)	—	17,254	14–12	L2
27	April 27	Royals	6–5	**Faedo** (2–1)	Stratton (2–2)	**Foley** (8)	22,734	15–12	W1
28	April 28	Royals	4–1	**Skubal** (4–0)	Wacha (1–3)	**Foley** (9)	18,794	16–12	W2
–	April 29	Cardinals	Postponed (inclement weather). Rescheduled to April 30.						
29	April 30	Cardinals	1–2	Liberatore (1–1)	**Miller** (3–3)	Helsley (10)	16,290	16–13	L1
30	April 30	Cardinals	11–6	**Holton** (2–0)	Leahy (0–1)	—	16,290	17–13	W1

May: 11–16 (Home 7–6, Road 4–10)

#	Date	Opponent	Score	Win	Loss	Save	Attendance	Record	Streak
31	May 1	Cardinals	4–1	**Maeda** (1–1)	Mikolas (2–4)	**Lange** (2)	16,035	18–13	W2
32	May 3	@ Yankees	1–2	Santana (2–0)	**Foley** (2–1)	—	37,386	18–14	L1
33	May 4	@ Yankees	3–5	Schmidt (3–1)	**Mize** (1–1)	Holmes (11)	45,017	18–15	L2
34	May 5	@ Yankees	2–5 (8)	González (2–1)	**Miller** (3–4)	Santana (2)	35,119	18–16	L3
35	May 6	@ Guardians	1–2	Sandlin (3–0)	**Flaherty** (0–2)	Clase (11)	15,029	18–17	L4
36	May 7	@ Guardians	11–7	**Holton** (3–0)	Ávila (1–1)	—	15,531	19–17	W1
37	May 8	@ Guardians	4–5 (10)	Clase (2–1)	**Lange** (0–2)	—	20,788	19–18	L1
38	May 10	Astros	2–5	Valdez (2–1)	**Chafin** (2–1)	Hader (5)	21,215	19–19	L2
39	May 11	Astros	8–2	**Skubal** (5–0)	Javier (2–1)	—	27,140	20–19	W1
40	May 12	Astros	3–9	Verlander (2–1)	**Flaherty** (0–3)	—	27,004	20–20	L1
41	May 13	Marlins	6–5	**Faedo** (3–1)	Maldonado (0–1)	**Foley** (10)	12,901	21–20	W1
42	May 14	Marlins	0–1 (10)	Scott (2–4)	**Lange** (0–3)	Puk (1)	16,498	21–21	L1
43	May 15	Marlins	0–2	Rogers (1–6)	**Mize** (1–2)	Scott (5)	19,806	21–22	L2
44	May 17	@ Diamondbacks	13–0	**Skubal** (6–0)	Nelson (2–3)	—	25,122	22–22	W1
45	May 18	@ Diamondbacks	8–3	**Flaherty** (1–3)	Gallen (5–3)	—	35,826	23–22	W2
46	May 19	@ Diamondbacks	4–6	Thompson (2–0)	**Holton** (3–1)	Sewald (3)	26,911	23–23	L1
47	May 20	@ Royals	3–8	Wacha (4–4)	**Olson** (0–5)	Stratton (3)	12,986	23–24	L2
48	May 21	@ Royals	3–10	Marsh (4–1)	**Mize** (1–3)	—	14,031	23–25	L3
49	May 22	@ Royals	3–8	Ragans (4–3)	**Skubal** (6–1)	—	15,004	23–26	L4
50	May 23	Blue Jays	1–9	Gausman (3–3)	**Flaherty** (1–4)	—	17,049	23–27	L5
51	May 24	Blue Jays	6–2	**Maeda** (2–1)	Manoah (1–2)	**Foley** (11)	27,160	24–27	W1
52	May 25	Blue Jays	2–1	**Olson** (1–5)	Berríos (5–4)	**Holton** (1)	35,331	25–27	W2
53	May 26	Blue Jays	14–11	**Englert** (1–0)	Romano (1–2)	—	27,627	26–27	W3
—	May 28	Pirates	Postponed (inclement weather). Rescheduled to May 29.						
54	May 29	Pirates	8–0	**Skubal** (7–1)	Jones (3–5)	—	23,408	27–27	W4
55	May 29	Pirates	2–10	Skenes (2–0)	**Montero** (0–1)	—	23,408	27–28	L1
56	May 30	@ Red Sox	5–0	**Flaherty** (2–4)	Pivetta (2–4)	—	31,077	28–28	W1
57	May 31	@ Red Sox	3–7	Houck (5–5)	**Maeda** (2–2)	—	31,231	28–29	L1

June : 10–17 (Home 5–7, Road 5–10)

#	Date	Opponent	Score	Win	Loss	Save	Attendance	Record	Streak
58	June 1	@ Red Sox	3–6	Criswell (3–2)	**Olson** (1–6)	—	33,806	28–30	L2
59	June 2	@ Red Sox	8–4 (10)	**Chafin** (3–1)	Booser (0–2)	—	34,662	29–30	W1
60	June 3	@ Rangers	2–1	**Brieske** (1–0)	Leclerc (3–4)	—	28,620	30–30	W2
61	June 4	@ Rangers	3–1	**Flaherty** (3–4)	Dunning (4–4)	**Foley** (12)	35,095	31–30	W3
62	June 5	@ Rangers	1–9	Ureña (2–5)	**Wentz** (0–1)	—	29,748	31–31	L1
63	June 7	Brewers	0–10	Myers (2–2)	**Olson** (1–7)	—	24,512	31–32	L2
64	June 8	Brewers	4–5	Koenig (6–1)	**Mize** (1–4)	Megill (9)	32,333	31–33	L3
65	June 9	Brewers	10–2	**Skubal** (8–1)	Wilson (3–3)	—	24,077	32–33	W1
66	June 11	Nationals	4–5 (10)	Finnegan (2–3)	**Chafin** (3–2)	—	18,368	32–34	L1
67	June 12	Nationals	5–7	Irvin (5–5)	**Olson** (1–8)	Finnegan (19)	20,645	32–35	L2
68	June 13	Nationals	7–2	**Miller** (4–4)	Law (3–2)	—	21,925	33–35	W1
69	June 14	@ Astros	0–4	Brown (3–5)	**Skubal** (8–2)	—	36,902	33–36	L1
70	June 15	@ Astros	13–5	**Flaherty** (4–4)	Arrighetti (3–6)	—	37,675	34–36	W1
71	June 16	@ Astros	1–4	Blanco (7–2)	**Maeda** (2–3)	—	39,199	34–37	L1
72	June 17	@ Braves	1–2	Hernández (1–0)	**Miller** (4–5)	Jiménez (1)	38,273	34–38	L2
73	June 18	@ Braves	1–2	Schwellenbach (1–2)	**Mize** (1–5)	Iglesias (19)	37,561	34–39	L3
74	June 19	@ Braves	0–7	López (5–2)	**Skubal** (8–3)		36,055	34–40	L4
75	June 21	White Sox	2–1	**Flaherty** (5–4)	Fedde (5–2)	**Foley** (13)	24,938	35–40	W1
76	June 22	White Sox	1–5	Thorpe (1–1)	**Maeda** (2–4)	—	29,269	35–41	L1
77	June 23	White Sox	11–2	**Olson** (2–8)	Cannon (1–2)	—	22,975	36–41	W1
78	June 24	Phillies	1–8	Nola (9–3)	**Mize** (1–6)	—	20,108	36–42	L1
79	June 25	Phillies	4–1	**Skubal** (9–3)	Suárez (10–2)	—	24,345	37–42	W1
80	June 26	Phillies	2–6	Ruiz (2–1)	**Montero** (0–2)	—	22,530	37–43	L1
81	June 27	@ Angels	0–5	Daniel (1–0)	**Flaherty** (5–5)	—	27,340	37–44	L2
82	June 28	@ Angels	2–5	García (3–0)	**Miller** (4–6)	Estévez (16)	34,381	37–45	L3
83	June 29	@ Angels	5–6 (10)	Joyce (1–0)	**Foley** (2–2)	—	39,559	37–46	L4
84	June 30	@ Angels	7–6	**Mize** (2–6)	Anderson (7–8)	**Holton** (2)	35,061	38–46	W1

July : 14–11 (Home 6–6, Road 8–5)

#	Date	Opponent	Score	Win	Loss	Save	Attendance	Record	Streak
85	July 2	@ Twins	3–5	Alcalá (2–3)	**Vest** (1–2)	Durán (13)	19,609	38–47	L1
86	July 3	@ Twins	9–2	**Montero** (1–2)	Festa (1–1)	—	25,053	39–47	W1
87	July 4	@ Twins	3–12 (7)	Ober (8–4)	**Maeda** (2–5)	—	20,893	39–48	L1
88	July 5	@ Reds	5–4	**Olson** (3–8)	Spiers (2–2)	**Foley** (14)	40,663	40–48	W1
89	July 6	@ Reds	5–3	**Miller** (5–6)	Cruz (3–6)	**Chafin** (1)	31,464	41–48	W2
90	July 7	@ Reds	5–1	**Skubal** (10–3)	Ashcraft (5–5)	—	25,451	42–48	W3
91	July 8	Guardians	1–0	**Holton** (4–1)	Barlow (2–3)	**Miller** (1)	17,677	43–48	W4
92	July 9	Guardians	8–9 (10)	Barlow (3–3)	**Vest** (1–3)	Clase (28)	17,111	43–49	L1
93	July 10	Guardians	5–4	**Olson** (4–8)	Bibee (7–4)	**Foley** (15)	16,862	44–49	W1
94	July 11	Guardians	10–1	**Flaherty** (6–5)	Howard (1–2)	—	22,399	45–49	W2
95	July 12	Dodgers	3–4	Petersen (3–0)	**Foley** (2–3)	Hudson (4)	42,060	45–50	L1
96	July 13	Dodgers	11–9 (10)	**Vest** (2–3)	Ramírez (0–4)	—	40,196	46–50	W1
97	July 14	Dodgers	4–3	**Faedo** (4–1)	Ramírez (0–5)	—	35,159	47–50	W2
**94th All-Star Game in Arlington, TX**
98	July 19	@ Blue Jays	5–4	**Flaherty** (7–5)	Bassitt (8–8)	**Holton** (3)	39,697	48–50	W3
99	July 20	@ Blue Jays	7–3	**Faedo** (5–1)	Kikuchi (4–9)	—	38,583	49–50	W4
100	July 21	@ Blue Jays	4–5	Gausman (8–8)	**Montero** (1–3)	Green (7)	38,766	49–51	L1
101	July 22	@ Guardians	8–2	**Skubal** (11–3)	Carrasco (3–8)	—	22,451	50–51	W1
102	July 23	@ Guardians	4–5	Smith (5–1)	**Wentz** (0–2)	Clase (30)	23,277	50–52	L1
103	July 24	@ Guardians	1–2	Gaddis (4–2)	**Brieske** (1–1)	Clase (31)	24,633	50–53	L2
104	July 25	@ Guardians	3–0	**Lucas** (1–0)	Williams (0–3)	**Miller** (2)	32,867	51–53	W1
105	July 26	Twins	3–9	López (9–7)	**Montero** (1–4)	—	27,778	51–54	L1
106	July 27	Twins	7–2	**Skubal** (12–3)	Ryan (6–7)	—	35,138	52–54	W1
107	July 28	Twins	0–5	Ober (10–5)	**Faedo** (5–2)	—	24,264	52–55	L1
108	July 29	Guardians	2–8	Bibee (9–4)	**Brieske** (1–2)	—	18,387	52–56	L2
109	July 30	Guardians	0–5	Williams (1–3)	**Faedo** (5–3)	—	23,239	52–57	L3

August: 17–11 (Home 9–6, Road 8–5)

#	Date	Opponent	Score	Win	Loss	Save	Attendance	Record	Streak
110	August 1	Royals	1–7	Lugo (13–5)	**Montero** (1–5)	—	15,743	52–58	L4
111	August 2	Royals	2–9	Ragans (8–7)	**Skubal** (12–4)	—	21,035	52–59	L5
112	August 3	Royals	6–5 (11)	**Foley** (3–3)	McArthur (4–5)	—	35,210	53–59	W1
113	August 4	Royals	2–3	Stratton (4–3)	**Miller** (5–7)	Harvey (1)	25,990	53–60	L1
114	August 6	@ Mariners	4–2	**Montero** (2–5)	Castillo (9–11)	**Holton** (4)	27,119	54–60	W1
115	August 7	@ Mariners	6–2	**Skubal** (13–4)	Kirby (8–8)	—	26,033	55–60	W2
116	August 8	@ Mariners	3–4	Chargois (2–0)	**Vest** (2–4)	—	27,927	55–61	L1
117	August 9	@ Giants	2–3	Rogers (2–4)	**Foley** (3–4)	—	33,037	55–62	L2
118	August 10	@ Giants	1–3	Webb (10–8)	**Hurter** (0–1)	Walker (1)	40,030	55–63	L3
119	August 11	@ Giants	5–4	**Montero** (3–5)	Birdsong (3–2)	**Vest** (1)	40,447	56–63	W1
120	August 13	Mariners	15–1	**Skubal** (14–4)	Kirby (8–9)	**Wentz** (1)	20,170	57–63	W2
121	August 14	Mariners	3–2 (10)	**Holton** (5–1)	Snider (2–2)	—	18,714	58–63	W3
122	August 15	Mariners	2–1	**Miller** (6–7)	Muñoz (2–4)	**Foley** (16)	20,429	59–63	W4
123	August 16	Yankees	0–3	Cole (4–2)	**Brieske** (1–3)	Holmes (26)	36,244	59–64	L1
124	August 17	Yankees	4–0	**Montero** (4–5)	Rodón (13–8)	—	38,110	60–64	W1
125	August 18	Yankees (Note: Played at Bowman Field in Williamsport, Pennsylvania)	3–2 (10)	**Brieske** (2–3)	Leiter Jr. (3–5)	—	2,532	61–64	W2
126	August 20	@ Cubs	1–3	Assad (6–3)	**Sammons** (0–1)	Hodge (2)	31,119	61–65	L1
127	August 21	@ Cubs	8–2	**Hurter** (1–1)	Taillon (8–8)	—	31,940	62–65	W1
128	August 22	@ Cubs	2–10	Steele (4–5)	**Maeda** (2–6)	—	33,536	62–66	L1
129	August 23	@ White Sox	5–2	**Vest** (3–4)	Ellard (1–2)	**Foley** (17)	24,012	63–66	W1
130	August 24	@ White Sox	13–4	**Skubal** (15–4)	Bush (0–3)	—	23,570	64–66	W2
131	August 25	@ White Sox	9–4	**Sammons** (1–1)	Cannon (2–8)	—	16,928	65–66	W3
132	August 26	@ White Sox	6–3	**Guenther** (1–0)	Shuster (1–3)	**Holton** (5)	10,975	66–66	W4
133	August 27	Angels	6–2	**Hurter** (2–1)	Cueto (0–2)	**Foley** (18)	18,258	67–66	W5
134	August 28	Angels	3–2	**Maeda** (3–6)	Canning (4–12)	**Foley** (19)	16,303	68–66	W6
135	August 29	Angels	0–3	Kochanowicz (2–3)	**Montero** (4–6)	Joyce (3)	16,119	68–67	L1
136	August 30	Red Sox	5–7 (10)	Jansen (4–2)	**Miller** (6–8)	Martin (2)	25,207	68–68	L2
137	August 31	Red Sox	2–1	**Skubal** (16–4)	Pivetta (5–10)	**Holton** (6)	34,355	69–68	W1

September: 17–8 (Home 9–4, Road 8–4)

#	Date	Opponent	Score	Win	Loss	Save	Attendance	Record	Streak
138	September 1	Red Sox	4–1	**Hurter** (3–1)	Hill (0–1)	**Foley** (20)	30,173	70–68	W2
139	September 2	@ Padres	0–3	Musgrove (5–4)	**Hanifee** (0–1)	Suárez (31)	44,957	70–69	L1
140	September 4	@ Padres	5–6 (10)	Estrada (5–2)	**Foley** (3–5)	—	41,669	70–70	L2
141	September 5	@ Padres	4–3	**Vanasco** (1–0)	Suárez (8–3)	**Holton** (7)	40,221	71–70	W1
142	September 6	@ Athletics	6–7 (13)	Holman (1–1)	**Brieske** (2–4)	—	14,669	71–71	L1
143	September 7	@ Athletics	2–1	**Hurter** (4–1)	McFarland (2–2)	**Foley** (21)	14,694	72–71	W1
144	September 8	@ Athletics	9–1	**Madden** (1–0)	Ginn (0–1)	—	11,250	73–71	W2
145	September 10	Rockies	11–0	**Montero** (5–6)	Blalock (1–3)	—	18,120	74–71	W3
146	September 11	Rockies	7–4	**Holton** (6–1)	Gordon (0–6)	**Foley** (22)	18,847	75–71	W4
147	September 12	Rockies	2–4	Halvorsen (1–0)	**Foley** (3–6)	Kinley (12)	19,538	75–72	L1
148	September 13	Orioles	1–0	**Hurter** (5–1)	Eflin (10–9)	**Holton** (8)	25,253	76–72	W1
149	September 14	Orioles	2–4	Burnes (14–8)	**Madden** (1–1)	—	33,513	76–73	L1
150	September 15	Orioles	4–2	**Montero** (6–6)	Povich (2–9)	**Foley** (23)	20,643	77–73	W1
151	September 16	@ Royals	7–6	**Hanifee** (1–1)	Long (3–2)	**Foley** (24)	18,920	78–73	W2
152	September 17	@ Royals	3–1 (10)	**Holton** (7–1)	Erceg (2–6)	**Foley** (25)	21,086	79–73	W3
153	September 18	@ Royals	4–2	**Skubal** (17–4)	Marsh (8–9)	**Vest** (2)	16,279	80–73	W4
154	September 20	@ Orioles	1–7	Burnes (15–8)	**Holton** (7–2)	—	33,629	80–74	L1
155	September 21	@ Orioles	6–4 (10)	**Brieske** (3–4)	Canó (4–3)	—	39,647	81–74	W1
156	September 22	@ Orioles	4–3	**Guenther** (2–0)	Suárez (8–7)	**Foley** (26)	44,040	82–74	W2
157	September 24	Rays	2–1	**Skubal** (18–4)	Pepiot (8–7)	**Brieske** (1)	22,770	83–74	W3
158	September 25	Rays	7–1	**Guenther** (3–0)	Littell (8–10)	—	32,463	84–74	W4
159	September 26	Rays	4–3	**Brieske** (4–4)	Cleavinger (7–5)	**Foley** (27)	27,867	85–74	W5
160	September 27	White Sox	4–1	**Hurter** (6–1)	Shuster (2–5)	**Foley** (28)	44,435	86–74	W6
161	September 28	White Sox	0–4	Burke (2–0)	**Brieske** (4–5)	—	41,933	86–75	L1
162	September 29	White Sox	5–9	Cannon (5–10)	**Maeda** (3–7)	De Los Santos (2)	41,740	86–76	L2

Legend: = Win = Loss = Postponement = Clinched playoff spot
Bold = Tigers team member

=== Postseason ===
2024 Postseason Game Log: 4–3 (Home 1–1, Road 3–2)
AL Wild Card Series: 2–0 (Home 0–0, Road 2–0)

#	Date	Opponent	Score	Win	Loss	Save	Attendance	Record
1	October 1	@ Astros	3–1	**Skubal** (1–0)	Valdez (0–1)	**Brieske** (1)	40,617	1–0
2	October 2	@ Astros	5–2	**Guenther** (1–0)	Pressly (0–1)	**Vest** (1)	40,824	2–0

AL Division Series: 2–3 (Home 1–1, Road 1–2)

#	Date	Opponent	Score	Win	Loss	Save	Attendance	Record
1	October 5	@ Guardians	0–7	Smith (1–0)	**Holton** (0–1)	—	33,548	0–1
2	October 7	@ Guardians	3–0	**Vest** (1–0)	Clase (0–1)	**Brieske** (2)	33,650	1–1
3	October 9	Guardians	3–0	**Hurter** (1–0)	Cobb (0–1)	**Holton** (1)	44,885	2–1
4	October 10	Guardians	4–5	Gaddis (1–0)	**Brieske** (0–1)	Clase (1)	44,923	2–2
5	October 12	@ Guardians	3–7	Herrin (1–0)	**Skubal** (1–1)	Clase (2)	34,105	2–3

==== Postseason rosters ====
Playoff rosters
American League Wild Card Series

- Pitchers: 4 Beau Brieske 12 Casey Mize 19 Will Vest 21 Jackson Jobe 29 Tarik Skubal 36 Ty Madden 45 Reese Olson 48 Brant Hurter 68 Jason Foley 73 Sean Guenther 75 Brenan Hanifee 87 Tyler Holton
- Catchers: 34 Jake Rogers 38 Dillon Dingler
- Infielders: 17 Jace Jung 20 Spencer Torkelson 27 Trey Sweeney 33 Colt Keith 39 Zach McKinstry 77 Andy Ibáñez
- Outfielders: 8 Matt Vierling 22 Parker Meadows 30 Kerry Carpenter 31 Riley Greene 44 Justyn-Henry Malloy 46 Wenceel Pérez

American League Division Series

- Pitchers: 4 Beau Brieske 19 Will Vest 21 Jackson Jobe 29 Tarik Skubal 36 Ty Madden 45 Reese Olson 48 Brant Hurter 54 Keider Montero 68 Jason Foley 73 Sean Guenther 75 Brenan Hanifee 87 Tyler Holton
- Catchers: 34 Jake Rogers 38 Dillon Dingler
- Infielders: 17 Jace Jung 20 Spencer Torkelson 27 Trey Sweeney 33 Colt Keith 39 Zach McKinstry 77 Andy Ibáñez
- Outfielders: 8 Matt Vierling 22 Parker Meadows 30 Kerry Carpenter 31 Riley Greene 44 Justyn-Henry Malloy 46 Wenceel Pérez

== Roster ==
2024 Detroit Tigers
Roster
Pitchers: 4 Beau Brieske; 17 Andrew Chafin; 53 Mason Englert; 49 Alex Faedo; 9 Jack Flaherty; 68 Jason Foley; 73 Sean Guenther; 75 Brenan Hanifee; 87 Tyler Holton; 48 Brant Hurter; 21 Jackson Jobe; 55 Alex Lange; 57 Easton Lucas; 36 Ty Madden; 18 Kenta Maeda; 25 Matt Manning; 7 Shelby Miller; 12 Casey Mize; 54 Keider Montero; 45 Reese Olson; 62 Bryan Sammons; 29 Tarik Skubal; 57 Ricky Vanasco; 19 Will Vest; 43 Joey Wentz	Catchers: 38 Dillon Dingler; 15 Carson Kelly; 34 Jake Rogers; Infielders: 28 Javier Báez; 77 Andy Ibáñez; 17 Jace Jung; 33 Colt Keith; 40 Buddy Kennedy; 32 Ryan Kreidler; 40 Bligh Madris; 39 Zach McKinstry; 27 Trey Sweeney; 20 Spencer Torkelson; 13 Gio Urshela	Outfielders: 60 Akil Baddoo; 21 Mark Canha; 30 Kerry Carpenter; 31 Riley Greene; 36,44 Justyn-Henry Malloy; 22 Parker Meadows; 46 Wenceel Pérez; 8 Matt Vierling; 50 Ryan Vilade	Manager: 14 A. J. Hinch; Coaches: 37 Keith Beauregard (hitting); 90 Michael Brdar (hitting); 98 Chris Chinea (bullpen catcher); 56 Joey Cora (third base); 41 Chris Fetter (pitching); 99 Anthony Iapoce (first base); 86 Gary Jones (major league coach); 26 George Lombard (bench); 63 Robin Lund (assistant pitching); 61 Juan Nieves (assistant pitching); 97 Tim Remes (bullpen catcher); 83 Ryan Sienko (catching); 91 Lance Zawadzki (assistant hitting)

== Player stats ==
= Indicates team leader

= Indicates league leader

=== Batting ===
Note: G = Games played; AB = At bats; R = Runs scored; H = Hits; 2B = Doubles; 3B = Triples; HR = Home runs; RBI = Runs batted in; SB = Stolen bases; BB = Walks; AVG = Batting average; SLG = Slugging average

Player	G	AB	R	H	2B	3B	HR	RBI	SB	BB	AVG	SLG
Matt Vierling	144	518	80	133	28	5	16	57	6	41	.257	.423
Colt Keith	148	516	54	134	15	4	13	61	7	36	.260	.380
Riley Greene	137	512	82	134	27	6	24	74	4	64	.262	.479
Wenceel Pérez	112	389	51	94	16	6	9	37	9	32	.242	.383
Spencer Torkelson	92	342	45	75	21	1	10	37	0	33	.219	.374
Mark Canha	93	320	42	74	17	0	7	38	4	42	.231	.350
Jake Rogers	102	310	43	61	16	1	10	36	1	22	.197	.352
Gio Urshela	92	300	25	73	10	1	5	37	0	19	.243	.333
Zach McKinstry	118	297	32	64	14	5	4	23	16	24	.215	.337
Javier Báez	80	272	25	50	12	0	6	37	8	12	.184	.294
Parker Meadows	82	270	39	66	12	6	9	28	9	25	.244	.433
Kerry Carpenter	87	264	37	75	16	5	18	57	0	22	.284	.587
Andy Ibáñez	99	224	30	54	9	1	5	32	2	15	.241	.357
Justyn-Henry Malloy	71	202	18	41	7	1	8	21	1	23	.203	.366
Carson Kelly	60	179	21	43	4	1	7	29	0	17	.240	.391
Trey Sweeney	36	110	11	24	5	0	4	17	2	7	.218	.373
Dillon Dingler	27	84	2	14	5	2	1	11	0	3	.167	.310
Jace Jung	34	79	14	19	5	0	0	3	0	15	.241	.304
Akil Baddoo	31	73	7	10	2	2	2	5	1	8	.137	.301
Bligh Madris	21	67	8	18	3	0	1	5	0	6	.269	.358
Ryan Kreidler	35	59	9	7	0	0	1	2	5	6	.119	.169
Ryan Vilade	17	45	5	8	0	0	1	5	0	2	.178	.244
Buddy Kennedy	6	10	2	2	0	0	1	4	1	2	.200	.500
Team totals	162	5442	682	1273	244	47	162	656	76	476	.234	.385

Source:Baseball Reference

=== Pitching ===
Note: W = Wins; L = Losses; ERA = Earned run average; G = Games pitched; GS = Games started; SV = Saves; IP = Innings pitched; H = Hits allowed; R = Runs allowed; ER = Earned runs allowed; BB = Walks allowed; SO = Strikeouts

Player	W	L	ERA	G	GS	SV	IP	H	R	ER	BB	SO
Tarik Skubal	18	4	2.39	31	31	0	192.0	142	54	51	35	228
Kenta Maeda	3	7	6.09	29	17	0	112.1	124	80	76	31	96
Reese Olson	4	8	3.53	22	22	0	112.1	100	51	44	33	101
Jack Flaherty	7	5	2.95	18	18	0	106.2	83	38	35	19	133
Casey Mize	2	6	4.49	22	20	0	102.1	121	57	51	29	78
Keider Montero	6	6	4.76	19	16	0	98.1	100	54	52	31	77
Tyler Holton	7	2	2.19	66	9	8	94.1	57	25	23	17	77
Will Vest	3	4	2.82	69	0	2	70.1	61	23	22	18	63
Beau Brieske	4	5	3.59	46	12	1	67.2	55	31	27	30	69
Jason Foley	3	6	3.15	69	0	28	60.0	51	28	21	20	46
Alex Faedo	5	3	3.61	37	6	0	57.1	49	24	23	28	55
Shelby Miller	6	8	4.53	51	0	2	55.2	41	31	28	13	49
Joey Wentz	0	2	5.37	38	0	1	55.1	60	35	33	27	60
Brant Hurter	6	1	2.58	10	1	0	45.1	34	13	13	6	38
Andrew Chafin	3	2	3.16	41	0	1	37.0	35	16	13	16	50
Brenan Hanifee	1	1	1.84	21	3	0	29.1	27	7	6	6	23
Matt Manning	0	1	4.88	5	5	0	27.2	31	15	15	12	23
Bryan Sammons	1	1	3.62	6	0	0	27.1	16	11	11	9	18
Ty Madden	1	1	4.30	6	1	0	23.0	25	12	11	8	17
Mason Englert	1	0	5.40	12	1	0	21.2	23	15	13	5	16
Sean Guenther	3	0	0.86	17	0	0	21.0	9	2	2	2	12
Alex Lange	0	3	4.34	21	0	2	18.2	16	16	9	17	21
Jackson Jobe	0	0	0.00	2	0	0	4.0	1	0	0	1	2
Easton Lucas	1	0	5.40	3	0	0	3.1	3	2	2	2	2
Zach McKinstry	0	0	9.00	3	0	0	2.0	1	2	2	1	0
Ricky Vanasco	1	0	0.00	2	0	0	2.0	0	0	0	0	0
Team totals	86	76	3.61	162	162	45	1447.0	1265	642	581	416	1354

Source:Baseball Reference

== Farm system ==
Level	Team	League	Manager
AAA	Toledo Mud Hens	International League	Tim Federowicz
AA	Erie SeaWolves	Eastern League	Gabe Álvarez
High-A	West Michigan Whitecaps	Midwest League	Tony Cappuccilli
Single-A	Lakeland Flying Tigers	Florida State League	Andrew Graham
Rookie	Florida Complex League Tigers	Florida Complex League	Salvador Paniagua
Rookie	DSL Tigers 1	Dominican Summer League	Marcos Yepez
Rookie	DSL Tigers 2	Dominican Summer League	Sandy Acevedo
