= Sean Guenther =

American baseball player (born 1995)

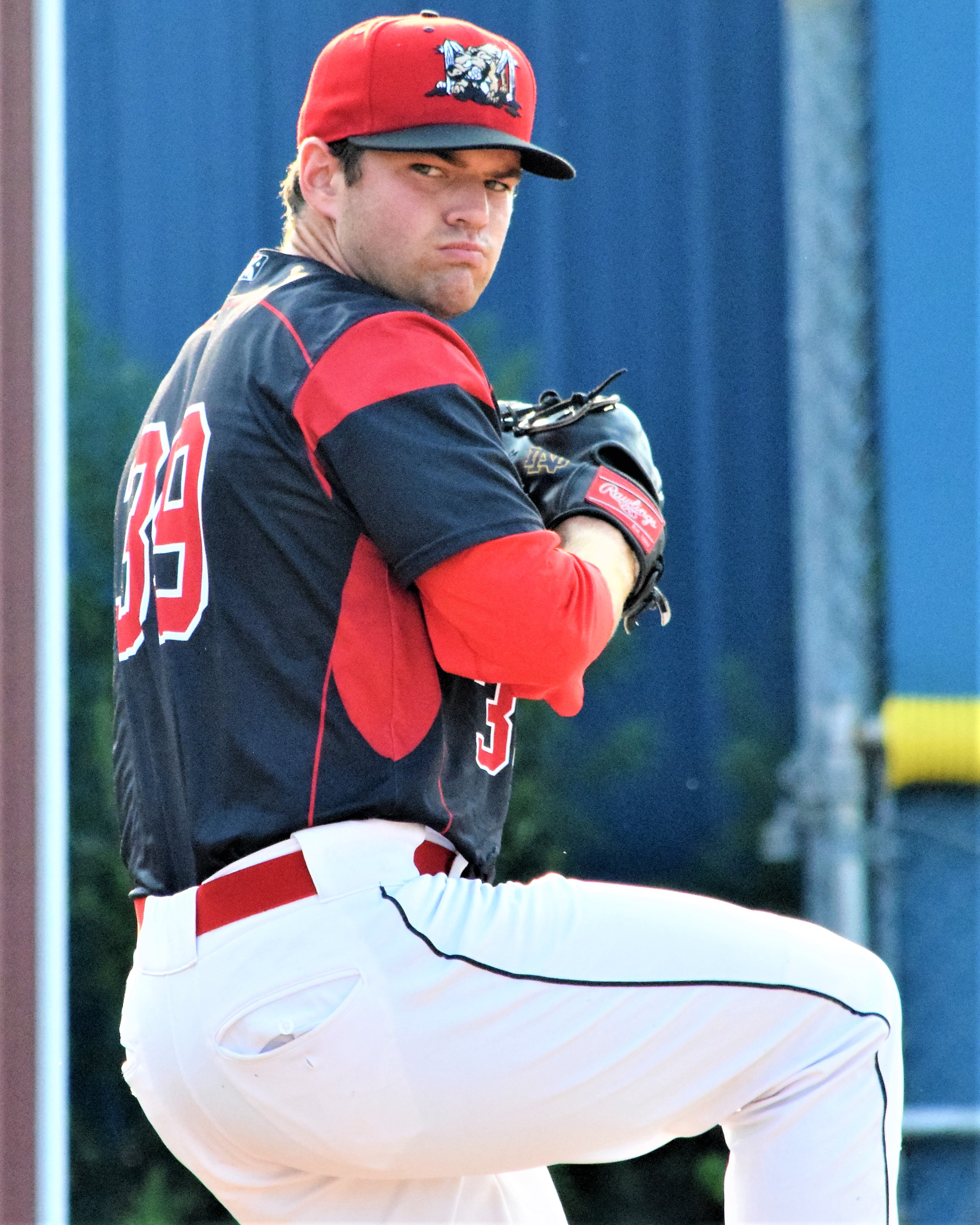
- Guenther with the Batavia Muckdogs in 2017

Free agent
- Pitcher
- Born: December 29, 1995 (age 30); Atlanta, Georgia, U.S.
- Bats: Left Throws: Left

MLB debut
- August 4, 2021, for the Miami Marlins

MLB statistics (through 2025 season)
- Win–loss record: 3–2
- Earned run average: 5.05
- Strikeouts: 35
- Stats at Baseball Reference

Teams
- Miami Marlins (2021); Detroit Tigers (2024–2025)

Sean McManus Guenther (born December 29, 1995) is an American professional baseball pitcher who is a free agent. He has previously played in Major League Baseball (MLB) for the Miami Marlins and Detroit Tigers.

== Amateur career ==
A native of Atlanta, Georgia, Guenther attended Marist School in Brookhaven, Georgia. He graduated from high school in 2014. Guenther committed to play baseball for the Fighting Irish baseball team of the University of Notre Dame. During the 2014 summer, he played for the Brookhaven Bucks in the Sunbelt Baseball League. In his freshman season, Guenther was named a Louisville Slugger Freshman All-American and named on the ACC All-Freshman team as well as leading the Irish with five saves. In 2015, Guenther posted a 1–3 record with a 2.72 ERA and a 1.295 WHIP in his freshman season. In his Sophomore season, Guenther posted a 3–5 record, 4.62 ERA, and a 1.369 WHIP with 11 starts and 15 total appearances in 2016. After the 2016 season, Guenther played collegiate summer baseball for the Orleans Firebirds of the Cape Cod Baseball League. In his junior year, Guenther posted a 2–6 record, a 2.64 ERA, 1.328 WHIP, and seven saves. After his junior year, Guenther was drafted by the Miami Marlins in the seventh round (209th overall) of the 2017 MLB draft.

== Professional career ==
=== Miami Marlins ===
To begin his professional baseball career, Guenther was assigned to the Gulf Coast League Marlins of the Gulf Coast League in 2017. In three starts and four total games with the GCL Marlins, Guenther only allowed one run, five hits, and eleven strikeouts in 11 innings. Guenther was quickly promoted to the Batavia Muckdogs of the New York-Penn League. In 40 innings with the Muckdogs, Guenther posted a 1–4 record with thirty-three strikeouts and a 3.83 ERA. For the 2018 season, Guenther was assigned to the Jupiter Hammerheads of the Florida State League. Early struggles with the Hammerheads had Guenther demoted to the Greensboro Grasshoppers of the Single-A South Atlantic League. Guenther also appeared in a rehab game with the GCL Marlins in 2018. In 2019, Guenther appeared with the Clinton LumberKings of the Midwest League and with the Jupiter Hammerheads. Guenther did not play in a game in 2020 due to the cancellation of the minor league season because of the COVID-19 pandemic.

To begin the 2021 season, Guenther was assigned to the Pensacola Blue Wahoos of Double-A South. In 17 2/3 innings with Pensacola, Guenther posted a 1–0 record with a 1.02 ERA and 28 strikeouts. On June 8, Guenther was promoted to the Jacksonville Jumbo Shrimp of Triple-A East. On August 4, Guenther was called up by the Marlins and made his debut 2 days later.

On April 7, 2022, Guenther underwent Tommy John surgery, ending his season before it began.

=== Detroit Tigers ===
On November 2, 2022, Guenther was claimed off waivers by the Detroit Tigers. On November 15, he was removed from the 40-man roster and sent outright to the Triple–A Toledo Mud Hens.

Guenther began the 2024 campaign with Toledo, recording a 3.86 ERA with 46 strikeouts and 3 saves across 44 1/3 innings pitched. On August 1, 2024, the Tigers selected Guenther's contract, adding him to their active roster. He made his season debut later that day against the Kansas City Royals, coming in with two outs in the 8th inning in relief of Brenan Hanifee. Guenther finished the 8th inning and continued into the 9th, ultimately giving up 1 hit, 1 earned run, and 0 walks over 1 1/3 innings.In 17 appearances for Detroit, Gunther logged a 3-0 record and 0.86 ERA with 12 strikeouts across 21 innings pitched.

Guenther was optioned to Triple-A Toledo to begin the 2025 season. On July 6, 2025, Guenther was placed on the 60-day injured list after undergoing a left hip arthroscopy. In nine appearances for Detroit, he had logged an 0-1 record and 5.23 ERA with eight strikeouts across 10 1/3 innings pitched. Guenther was designated for assignment by the Tigers on November 18. On November 21, he was non-tendered by Detroit and became a free agent.

On December 16, 2025, Guenther re-signed with the Tigers on a minor league contract. He made 12 appearances (including three starts) with Triple-A Toledo, posting an 0–2 record and 5.40 ERA with 15 strikeouts across 16 2/3 innings of work. Guenther was released by the Tigers organization on July 31, 2026.
