= Beau Brieske =

American baseball player (born 1998)

Detroit Tigers – No. 4
- Pitcher
- Born: April 4, 1998 (age 28); Chandler, Arizona, U.S.
- Bats: Right Throws: Right

MLB debut
- April 23, 2022, for the Detroit Tigers

MLB statistics (through 2026 season)
- Win–loss record: 11–17
- Earned run average: 4.23
- Strikeouts: 194
- Stats at Baseball Reference

Teams
- Detroit Tigers (2022–present)

Beau Conner Brieske (/ˈbrɪskiː/ BRISK-ee; born April 4, 1998) is an American professional baseball pitcher for the Detroit Tigers of Major League Baseball (MLB).

== Amateur career ==
Brieske attended Perry High School in Gilbert, Arizona, graduating in 2016. He spent two years playing college baseball at Glendale Community College before transferring to Colorado State University Pueblo for his junior season. As a junior, Brieske started 14 games in which he went 7–5 with a 5.42 ERA and 116 strikeouts over 79 2/3 innings.

== Professional career ==
Brieske was drafted by the Detroit Tigers in the 27th round, with the 802nd overall selection, of the 2019 Major League Baseball draft.

Brieske signed with Detroit and made his professional debut with the Rookie-level Gulf Coast League Tigers and was promoted to the Lakeland Flying Tigers of the High–A Florida State League to end the season. Over 20 1/3 innings between both teams, he went 3–1 with a 3.10 ERA. He did not play a minor league game in 2020 due to the cancellation of the season caused by the COVID-19 pandemic. Brieske began the 2021 season with the West Michigan Whitecaps of the High-A Central and was promoted to the Erie SeaWolves of the Double-A Northeast in late July. Over 21 starts between the two clubs, he pitched to a 9–4 record and 3.12 ERA with 116 strikeouts over 106 2/3 innings.

Brieske was assigned to the Toledo Mud Hens of the Triple-A International League to begin the 2022 season. After making two starts with Toledo, Brieske's contract was selected by the Tigers on April 22. He made his MLB debut for the Tigers as the starting pitcher on April 23, 2022, in a loss to the Colorado Rockies, pitching five innings in which he allowed three hits, three runs, two walks, and three strikeouts. Brieske earned his first major league win on June 11, throwing 5 2/3 scoreless innings in the Tigers' 3–1 victory over the Toronto Blue Jays. On July 21, Brieske was placed on the 15-day injured list with forearm soreness

Brieske returned for spring training in 2023 but ended up back on the injured list before the season started with the same injury that ended his 2022 season. He was activated from the injured list on July 7, 2023. In 25 games for Detroit, Brieske logged a 3.60 ERA with 31 strikeouts and 2 saves across 35 innings pitched.

Brieske was optioned to Triple–A Toledo to begin the 2024 season. In limited duty for the Tigers, he went 4–5 with a 3.59 ERA and 69 strikeouts in 67 2/3 innings. In the 2024 postseason, Brieske pitched in six of his team's seven games. He gave up only one hit in the six innings, that hit being a 2-run home run by David Fry.

On January 9, 2025, the Tigers and Brieske agreed to a one-year, $1.025 million contract, avoiding arbitration. In 22 appearances (one start) for Detroit, he struggled to a 1–3 record and 6.55 ERA with 16 strikeouts and one save across 22 innings of work. On July 10, Brieske was placed on the injured list due to right elbow soreness. He was transferred to the 60-day injured list on September 12, with the diagnosis of a right forearm strain.

At the start of the 2026 season, Brieske was diagnosed with an adductor strain and remained on the 60-day injured list. He returned to the active roster on May 29. Across 18 relief appearances for the Tigers, he went 1–0 with a 4.97 ERA and 24 strikeouts across 25 1/3 innings.
