= Matt Vierling =

American baseball player (born 1996)

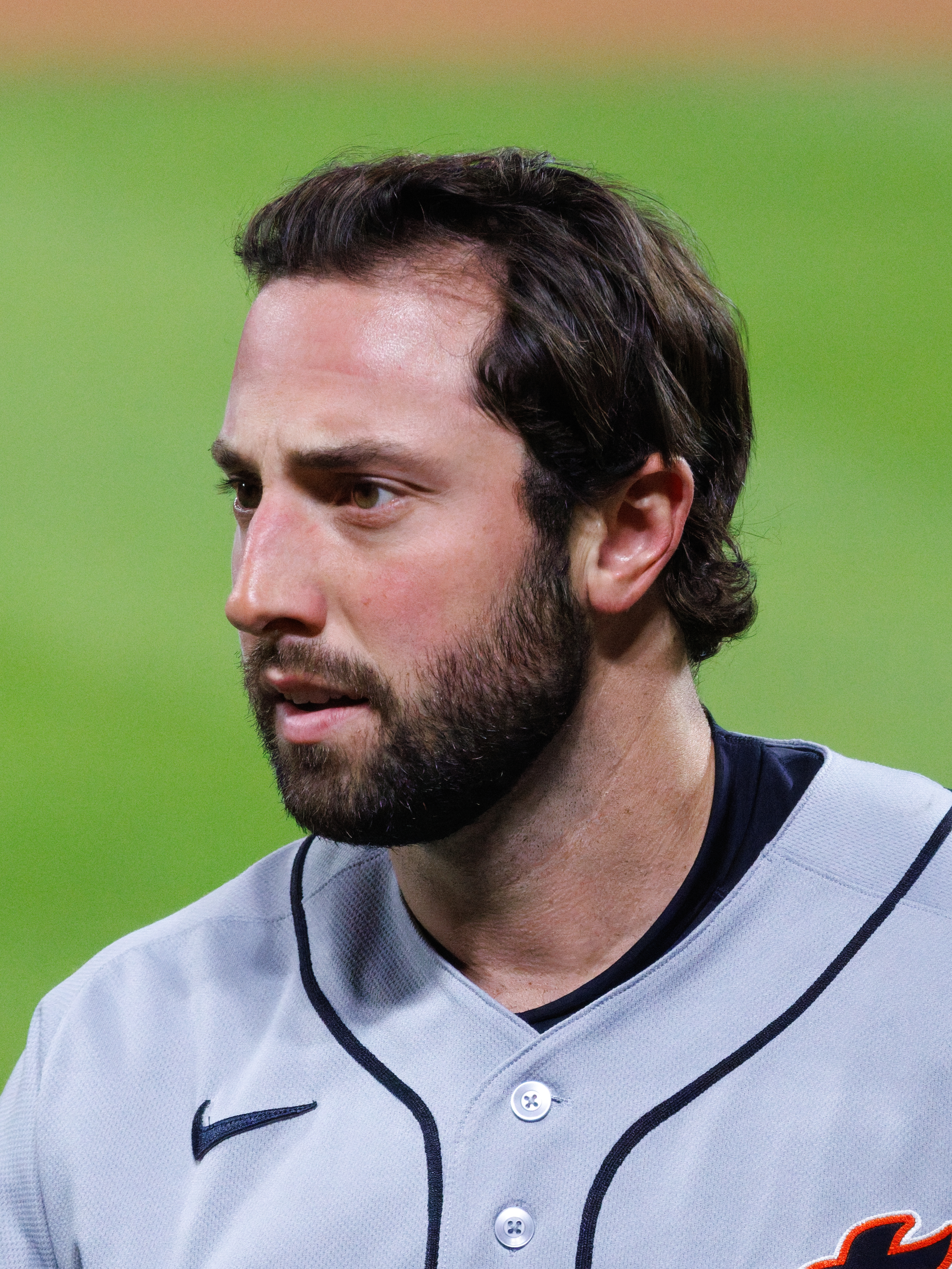
- Vierling with the Tigers in 2026

Free agent
- Utility player
- Born: September 16, 1996 (age 30); St. Louis, Missouri, U.S.
- Bats: Right Throws: Right

MLB debut
- June 19, 2021, for the Philadelphia Phillies

MLB statistics (through 2026 season)
- Batting average: .250
- Home runs: 40
- Runs batted in: 181
- Stats at Baseball Reference

Teams
- Philadelphia Phillies (2021–2022); Detroit Tigers (2023–2026)

Matthew Gregory Vierling (born September 16, 1996) is an American professional baseball utility player who is a free agent. He has previously played in Major League Baseball (MLB) for the Philadelphia Phillies and Detroit Tigers. He played college baseball at the University of Notre Dame. The Phillies selected Vierling in the fifth round of the 2018 Major League Baseball draft, and he made his MLB debut with them in 2021.

== Early life ==
Vierling was born in St. Louis, Missouri. His father was a former college football player for the Kansas Jayhawks. Both Vierling and his younger brother, Mark, were dedicated baseball players throughout their childhoods. They played for one season together in 2015 on the varsity team for Christian Brothers College High School in Town and Country, Missouri, where Matt led the Cadets to the Class 5 Missouri state high school baseball championship. Vierling, a senior, had been moved from his usual fielding position of outfielder to shortstop, next to his brother, a sophomore, at second base. That year, Vierling led Christian Brothers in most offensive metrics, batting .451 with three home runs, 32 runs batted in (RBIs), and 31 runs scored. He also had an 8–0 win–loss record as a pitcher, with a 2.07 earned run average (ERA).

== College career ==
Vierling was selected in the 30th round of the 2015 Major League Baseball draft by his hometown St. Louis Cardinals, but did not sign with the team and honored his commitment to the Notre Dame Fighting Irish.

Vierling attended the University of Notre Dame, and played college baseball for the Notre Dame Fighting Irish for three seasons. As a sophomore, he batted .330 with seven home runs and 42 RBIs and was named third team All-Atlantic Coast Conference (ACC). After his sophomore year, he played for the Harwich Mariners of the Cape Cod Baseball League. Vierling was named second team All-ACC as a junior after hitting for a .310 average with 10 home runs and 43 RBIs.

As a sophomore, he batted .330 with seven home runs and 42 RBIs and was named third team All-Atlantic Coast Conference (ACC). After the season, Vierling played summer collegiate baseball with the Harwich Mariners in the Cape Cod Baseball League, a prestigious summer league for top college prospects. He performed well enough to elevate his draft stock heading into his junior year.

== Professional career ==
=== Philadelphia Phillies (2018–2022) ===
==== Minor leagues ====
The Philadelphia Phillies selected Vierling in the fifth round of the 2018 Major League Baseball draft. After signing with the team, he was assigned to the short-season Williamsport Crosscutters. Vierling batted .420 in 12 games and was then promoted to the Single–A Lakewood Blue Claws for the remainder of the season. He spent the 2019 season with the Clearwater Threshers of the High–A Florida State League. Vierling did not play in a game in 2020 due to the cancellation of the minor league season because of the COVID-19 pandemic.

After starting the 2021 season at the Phillies' alternate training site, Vierling was assigned to the Double-A Reading Fightin Phils to begin the minor league season. He was promoted to the Triple–A Lehigh Valley IronPigs after hitting .345 with six home runs and 16 RBI in 24 games with Reading.

==== Major leagues ====
On June 19, 2021, Vierling was selected to the 40-man roster and promoted to the major leagues for the first time. He made his Major League debut that day as a pinch hitter, hitting a single to right field in his first at-bat off of San Francisco Giants reliever Jarlin García while also stealing second base and scoring a run. Vierling hit his first Major League home run on September 25, in Philadelphia in a 3–0 win over the Pittsburgh Pirates. In 2021, he had the fastest sprint speed of all major league first basemen, at 29.2 feet/second. By the first anniversary of his MLB debut, Vierling had started a game at six positions (1B, 2B, 3B, LF, CF, and RF).

On June 7, 2022, Vierling was recalled to the Phillies from the Triple–A Lehigh Valley IronPigs, and hit the game-winning home run off of Josh Hader of the Milwaukee Brewers. Vierling's first multi home run game was on June 17, in a win against the Washington Nationals. On September 21, Vierling went 5-for-5, including his first career walk-off hit in the 10th inning, in a 4–3 win against the Toronto Blue Jays, halting a five-game losing streak. In the regular season, he slashed .246/.297/.351 in 325 at–bats, with six home runs, 32 RBI, and seven stolen bases. Vierling had the fastest sprint speed of all Phillies players, at 29.6 feet/second. He played 61 games in center field, 37 in right field, 30 in left field, four at second base, and two at first base. As a center fielder, Vierling set up farther away from home plate than any other major leaguer, at a depth of 332 feet.

Vierling played in 12 games during the Phillies playoff run to the World Series in 2022. He had 15 plate appearances, with two hits, one walk, one RBI, and two runs.

=== Detroit Tigers (2023–present) ===
On January 7, 2023, the Phillies traded Vierling, infielder Nick Maton, and catcher Donny Sands to the Detroit Tigers for pitcher Gregory Soto and infielder Kody Clemens. For the 2023 season, Vierling played 134 games, batting .261 with 10 home runs and 44 RBI.

Vierling made 144 appearances for Detroit during the 2024 season, batting .257/.312/.423 with 16 home runs, 57 RBI, and six stolen bases.

On January 9, 2025, the Tigers and Vierling agreed to a one-year, $3.005 million contract, avoiding arbitration. Vierling started the regular season on the injured list with a strained rotator cuff. He returned to the active roster on May 23. However, after two more stints on the disabled list, the second shutting him down on August 10 due to an oblique strain, he played only 31 games for the 2025 Tigers. He hit .239 with one home run and 11 RBI.

Vierling made 92 appearances for Detroit in 2026, slashing .207/.255/.335 with five home runs, 31 RBI, and four stolen bases. On July 31, 2026, he was placed on the injured list due to a left adductor strain. On August 28, it was reported that Vierling had suffered a setback in his recovery due to a heel injury. He was transferred to the 60–day injured list on September 6, officially ending his season. He was designated for assignment by the Tigers on November 17. Three days later, Vierling was non-tendered by the Tigers and became a free agent.

== Player profile ==
Vierling is regarded as a highly versatile utility player. As of 2025, he has started games at six different positions in the major leagues: first base, second base, third base, left field, center field, and right field. He is also known for his above-average speed. In 2021, he recorded the fastest sprint speed among all MLB first basemen, at 29.2 feet per second. He topped that in 2022, reaching 29.6 feet per second — the highest on the Phillies roster. As a center fielder, he was also notable for his unusually deep positioning, setting up on average 332 feet from home plate — the farthest among all players at that position.
