= Brant Hurter =

American baseball player (born 1998)

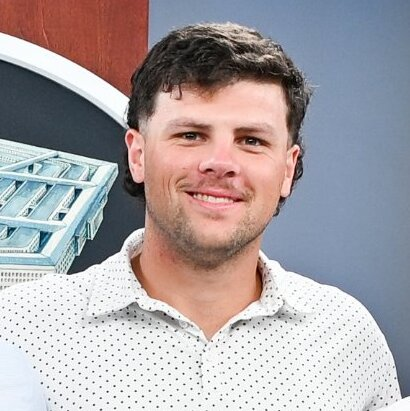
- Hurter at the Pentagon in 2025

Detroit Tigers – No. 48
- Pitcher
- Born: September 6, 1998 (age 28); Canton, Georgia, U.S.
- Bats: Left Throws: Left

MLB debut
- August 4, 2024, for the Detroit Tigers

MLB statistics (through 2026 season)
- Win–loss record: 14–5
- Earned run average: 2.63
- Strikeouts: 130
- Stats at Baseball Reference

Teams
- Detroit Tigers (2024–present)

Brant Harris Hurter (born September 6, 1998) is an American professional baseball pitcher for the Detroit Tigers of Major League Baseball (MLB).

== Career ==
Hurter attended Woodstock High School in Woodstock, Georgia, and played college baseball at Georgia Tech. In 2018, he played collegiate summer baseball with the Yarmouth–Dennis Red Sox of the Cape Cod Baseball League. He was drafted by the Detroit Tigers in the seventh round of the 2021 Major League Baseball draft.

Hurter made his professional debut with the Single–A Lakeland Flying Tigers in 2022. He was later promoted to the High–A West Michigan Whitecaps and Double–A Erie SeaWolves during the season, posting a cumulative 7–6 record and 3.71 ERA with 136 strikeouts for the three affiliates. Hurter made 26 starts for Erie in 2023, compiling a 6–7 record and 3.28 ERA with 133 strikeouts across 118 innings pitched.

Hurter began the 2024 campaign with the Triple–A Toledo Mud Hens, posting a 2–4 record and 5.80 ERA with 70 strikeouts over 19 games (18 starts). On August 4, 2024, Hurter was selected to the 40-man roster and promoted to the major leagues for the first time. He made his Major League debut that day when he tossed three scoreless innings against the Kansas City Royals, where he struck out Salvador Perez for his first career strikeout.

On March 31, 2025, Hurter recorded his first career save after tossing three innings of two-run ball in a 9–6 victory over the Seattle Mariners. On the season, he made 43 appearances for the Tigers (39 in relief and 4 as an opener), compiling a 4–3 record, 2.43 ERA, and 68 strikeouts in 63 innings pitched.

On May 24, 2026, Hurter was placed on the injured list due to lumbar spine inflammation. He was transferred to the 60-day injured list on May 29. Hurter was activated from the injured list on September 6.

== Pitch selection ==
Hurter throws a two-seam sinking fastball in the 91 to 93 MPH range (topping out at 95 MPH). His primary offspeed pitches are a slider in the 81 to 84 MPH range and a changeup averaging 85 to 87 MPH. The slider has been his toughest pitch to hit, yielding a .161 batting average against to date.
