= Ty Madden =

American baseball player (born 2000)

Detroit Tigers – No. 36
- Pitcher
- Born: February 21, 2000 (age 26); Cypress, Texas, U.S.
- Bats: Right Throws: Right

MLB debut
- August 26, 2024, for the Detroit Tigers

MLB statistics (through 2026 season)
- Win–loss record: 2–1
- Earned run average: 3.60
- Strikeouts: 63
- Stats at Baseball Reference

Teams
- Detroit Tigers (2024, 2026–present)

Tyler Dylan Madden (born February 21, 2000) is an American professional baseball pitcher for the Detroit Tigers of Major League Baseball (MLB). Madden played college baseball for the Texas Longhorns, and was selected 32nd overall by the Tigers in the 2021 MLB draft.

== Amateur career ==
Madden grew up in Cypress, Texas, and attended Cypress Ranch High School. He was rated a top-100 collegiate recruit and high school prospect for the MLB Draft and initially committed to play college baseball at Rice before switching his commitment to Texas going into his senior year. Madden was selected in the 34th round of the 2018 MLB Draft by the Kansas City Royals but opted not to sign with the team.

Madden pitched in 15 games with eight starts as a freshman, posting a 4–1 record with 3.40 ERA and 37 strikeouts in 42.1 innings pitched. After the 2019 season, he played collegiate summer baseball with the Chatham Anglers of the Cape Cod Baseball League. As a sophomore, he served as the Longhorns' Saturday starter and went 3–0 with a 1.80 ERA in four starts before the season was cut short due to the coronavirus pandemic. Madden entered his redshirt sophomore season on the watchlist for the Golden Spikes Award and a preseason All-American by multiple outlets, as well as a top pitching prospect in the upcoming draft. Madden was named first team All-Big 12 and the Conference Pitcher of the Year after posting a 7-5 record with a 2.45 ERA and 137 strikeouts in 113 2/3 innings over 18 starts.

== Professional career ==
Madden was selected by the Detroit Tigers with the 32nd overall pick of the 2021 Major League Baseball draft. He signed with the Tigers on July 19, 2021, for a $2.5 million bonus. Madden made his professional debut in 2022 with the High–A West Michigan Whitecaps. In 26 starts split between the Whitecaps and the Double–A Erie SeaWolves, he accumulated an 8–6 record and 3.01 ERA with 133 strikeouts across 122 2/3 innings pitched. Madden spent the entirety of the 2023 campaign with Erie, compiling a 3–4 record and 3.43 ERA with 146 strikeouts over 26 games (25 starts).

Madden began the 2024 campaign with Erie, and was promoted to the Triple–A Toledo Mud Hens in late April. In 22 starts between the two affiliates, he accumulated a 3–5 record and 6.98 ERA with 124 strikeouts over 96 2/3 innings pitched. On August 26, 2024, Madden was selected to the 40-man roster and promoted to the major leagues for the first time. He made his major league debut that day against the Chicago White Sox, tossing five innings and allowing two runs (one earned) on four hits with two strikeouts. In six appearances for Detroit during his rookie campaign, Madden posted a 1-1 record and 4.30 ERA with 17 strikeouts across 23 innings of work.

On March 28, 2025, Madden was placed on the 60-day injured list with a rotator cuff strain. On August 20, manager A. J. Hinch announced that Madden would not return in 2025.

Madden was optioned to Triple-A Toledo to begin the 2026 season. He was called up to the major league club in May. In 20 appearances with the Tigers, mostly in relief, he went 1–0 with a 3.26 ERA and 46 strikeouts in 47 innings.
