= Justyn-Henry Malloy =

American baseball player (born 2000)

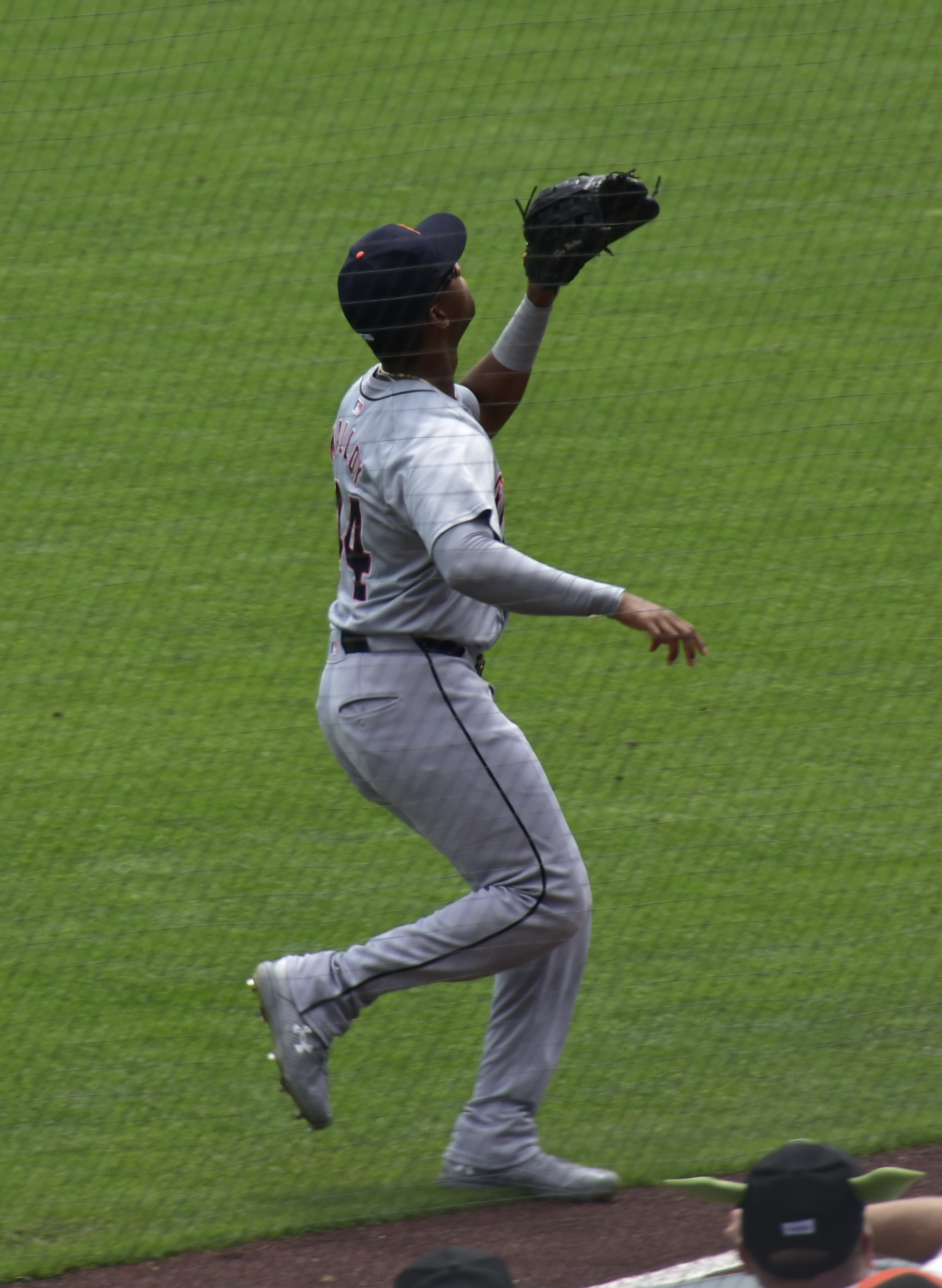
- Malloy with the Detroit Tigers

Tampa Bay Rays
- Outfielder / Third baseman
- Born: February 19, 2000 (age 26); New York City, U.S.
- Bats: Right Throws: Right

MLB debut
- June 3, 2024, for the Detroit Tigers

MLB statistics (through 2025 season)
- Batting average: .209
- Home runs: 9
- Runs batted in: 38
- Stats at Baseball Reference

Teams
- Detroit Tigers (2024–2025)

Justyn-Henry Conrad Malloy (born February 19, 2000) is an American professional baseball outfielder and third baseman in the Tampa Bay Rays organization. He has previously played in Major League Baseball (MLB) for the Detroit Tigers.

== Early life and amateur career ==
Malloy grew up in Bergenfield, New Jersey, and attended Saint Joseph Regional High School. He committed to attend Vanderbilt University after his freshman year, during which he batted .329 with five home runs and 31 RBIs. Malloy began his college baseball with the Vanderbilt Commodores. He played mostly as a reserve for the Commodores over two seasons. After his sophomore season, Malloy transferred to Georgia Tech. In his only season with the Yellow Jackets, he batted .308 with 11 home runs and 43 RBIs.

== Professional career ==
=== Atlanta Braves ===
The Atlanta Braves selected Malloy in the sixth round of the 2021 Major League Baseball draft. After signing with the team for a bonus of $297,500, he was assigned to the Low-A Augusta GreenJackets. Malloy was assigned to the High-A Rome Braves at the beginning of the 2022 season. He slashed .304/.409/.479 with 10 home runs, 16 doubles, and 44 RBIs in 71 games with Rome before being promoted to the Double-A Mississippi Braves in July. Malloy appeared in 54 games with Mississippi, hit for a .268 batting average with 11 doubles, six home runs, 31 RBI, .403 OBP, and .824 OPS, and was promoted to the Gwinnett Braves in September. After the 2022 Minor League Baseball season ended, MILB.com considered Malloy an organizational All-Star. He was assigned to the Scottsdale Scorpions of the Arizona Fall League in the 2022 offseason. In the AFL, Malloy primarily played left field, a position he had started playing upon his promotion to Mississippi.

=== Detroit Tigers ===
On December 7, 2022, Malloy and Jake Higginbotham were traded to the Detroit Tigers in exchange for Joe Jiménez. Malloy was assigned to the Triple-A Toledo Mud Hens to begin the 2023 season. He was selected to play in the All-Star Futures Game at midseason. In 136 games, Malloy batted .277/.417/.474 with 23 home runs and 83 RBI.

On June 3, 2024, Malloy was selected off the 40-man roster and promoted to the major leagues for the first time. Malloy's first major league hit was a 413-foot home run on June 5 against the Texas Rangers. It was the Tigers' only hit off Rangers starter José Ureña, and broke up a perfect game in the sixth inning. His third home run on June 30 was an inside-the-park homer off Tyler Anderson of the Los Angeles Angels. It was the Tigers' first inside-the-park home run since Victor Reyes in 2021, and the first at Angel Stadium since 2019 (Tommy La Stella). On July 21, Malloy recorded his first career grand slam off Kevin Gausman of the Toronto Blue Jays. On August 19, Malloy was optioned to the Mud Hens after batting .217 with 8 home runs and 20 RBI in 180 at-bats.

Malloy was optioned to Triple-A Toledo to begin the 2025 season. He made 52 appearances for Detroit during the year, batting .221/.346/.308 with one home run and 17 RBI. On December 20, 2025, Malloy was designated for assignment by the Tigers following the signing of Kyle Finnegan.

=== Tampa Bay Rays ===
On January 6, 2026, Malloy was traded to the Tampa Bay Rays in exchange for cash considerations. He was optioned to the Triple-A Durham Bulls to begin the regular season. On May 9, Malloy was designated for assignment by the Rays. He cleared waivers and was sent outright to Durham on May 11. In 85 games across 4 levels of the minors he batted .205/.358/.398 with 13 home runs, 41 RBIs and 10 stolen bases.
