= Jace Jung =

American baseball player (born 2000)

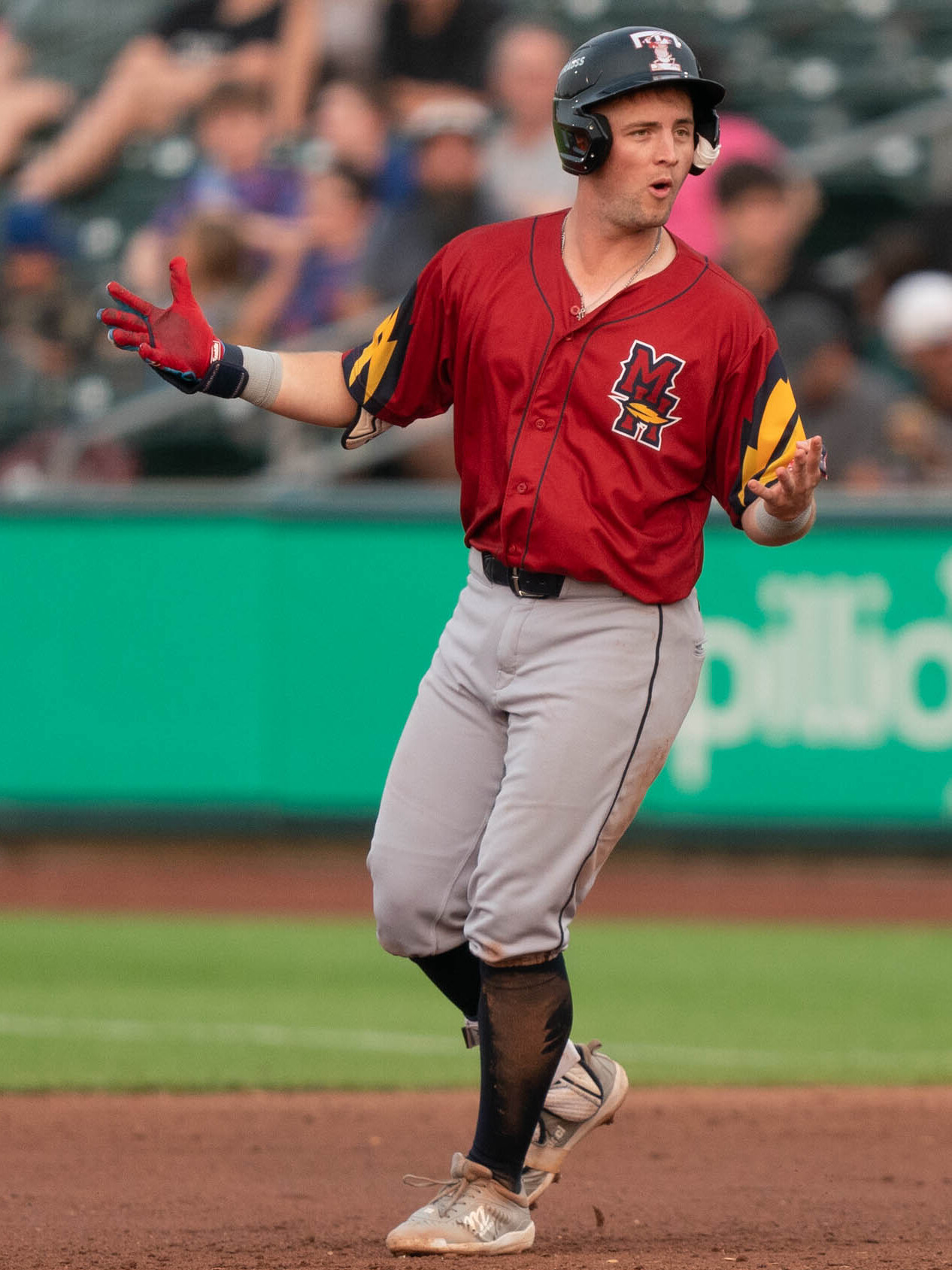
- Jung with the Toledo Mud Hens in 2025

Los Angeles Angels
- Second baseman / Third baseman
- Born: October 4, 2000 (age 26); San Antonio, Texas, U.S.
- Bats: Left Throws: Right

MLB debut
- August 16, 2024, for the Detroit Tigers

MLB statistics (through 2026 season)
- Batting average: .193
- Home runs: 0
- Runs batted in: 6
- Stats at Baseball Reference

Teams
- Detroit Tigers (2024–2026)

Jace Andrew Jung (yung; born October 4, 2000) is an American professional baseball second baseman and third baseman for the Los Angeles Angels of Major League Baseball (MLB). He has previously played in MLB for the Detroit Tigers. He played college baseball for the Texas Tech Red Raiders and made his MLB debut in 2024.

== Early life and amateur career ==
Jung grew up in San Antonio, Texas and attended Douglas MacArthur High School.

Jung enrolled at Texas Tech University to play college baseball for the Texas Tech Red Raiders. Jung batted .264 through 19 games of his true freshman season before it was cut short due to the coronavirus pandemic. As a redshirt freshman, Jung and was named the Big 12 Conference Baseball Player of the Year after batting for a .337 average with 21 home runs and 67 RBIs. During the summer of 2021, he played for the Orleans Firebirds of the Cape Cod Baseball League, batting .219 while playing second base. Jung was named the preseason Big 12 Player of the Year going into his redshirt sophomore season.

== Professional career ==
=== Detroit Tigers ===
The Detroit Tigers selected Jung in the first round, with the 12th overall selection, of the 2022 Major League Baseball draft. He signed with the team on July 25, 2022, and received a $4,590,300 signing bonus. Jung made his professional debut with the High–A West Michigan Whitecaps, batting .232/.373/.333. He split the 2023 campaign between West Michigan and the Double–A Erie SeaWolves, slashing .265/.376/.502 with 28 home runs and 82 RBI over 128 total games, and playing second base. He then played for the Salt River Rafters in the Arizona Fall League, and batted .200/.385/.300, switching to third base.

Jung began 2024 with the Triple–A Toledo Mud Hens, playing in 91 games and slashing .257/.377/.454 with 14 home runs and 60 RBI. On August 16, 2024, Jung was selected to the 40-man roster and promoted to the major leagues for the first time. He was also inserted into the lineup that evening to make his Major League debut. In 34 games for the Tigers, Jung batted .241/.362/.304 with no home runs and three RBI. He underwent an arthroscopic wrist procedure following the season in October.

Jung was optioned to Triple-A Toledo to begin the 2025 season. He was called up from Toledo on April 21, 2025. Jung made 21 total appearances for Detroit during the regular season, batting .106/.236/.106 with three RBI and seven walks.

Jung was again optioned to Triple-A Toledo to begin the 2026 season. He made six appearances for Detroit during the regular season, going 2–for–9 (.222) with two walks. Jung was designated for assignment by the Tigers on November 17, 2026.

=== Los Angeles Angels ===
On November 18, 2026, the Tigers traded Jung to the Los Angeles Angels in exchange for cash considerations.

== Personal life ==
Jung's older brother, Josh Jung, also played baseball at Texas Tech and was selected by the Texas Rangers in the first round of the 2019 MLB draft.
