= Bryan Sammons =

American baseball player (born 1995)

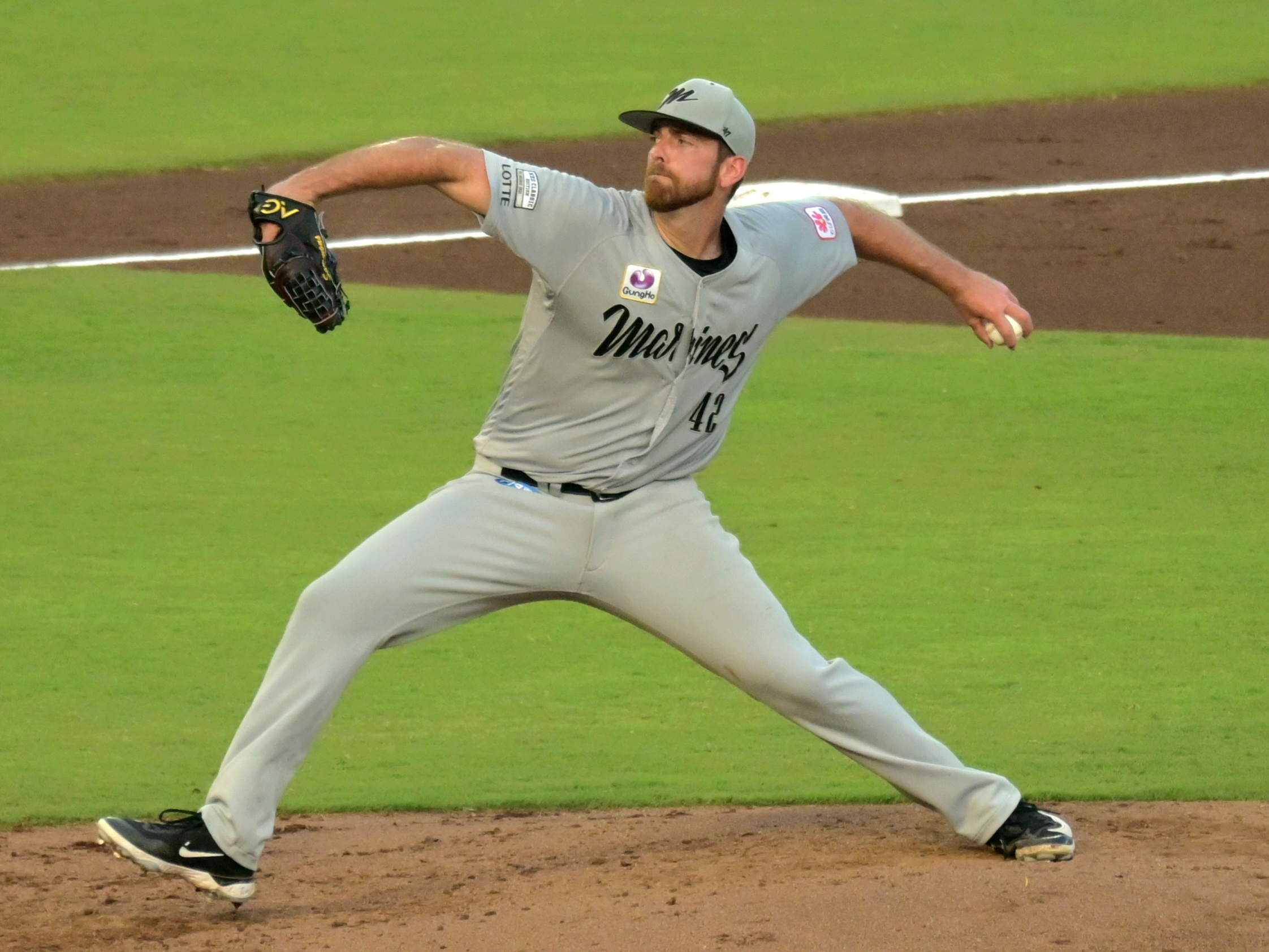
- Sammons with the Chiba Lotte Marines in 2025

Free agent
- Pitcher
- Born: April 27, 1995 (age 31); Wilmington, North Carolina, U.S.
- Bats: Left Throws: Left

Professional debut
- MLB: July 29, 2024, for the Detroit Tigers
- NPB: May 7, 2025, for the Chiba Lotte Marines

MLB statistics (through 2024 season)
- Win–loss record: 1–1
- Earned run average: 3.62
- Strikeouts: 18

NPB statistics (through 2025 season)
- Win–loss record: 5-5
- Earned run average: 3.78
- Strikeouts: 73
- Stats at Baseball Reference

Teams
- Detroit Tigers (2024); Chiba Lotte Marines (2025)

Bryan Todd Sammons (born April 27, 1995) is an American professional baseball pitcher who is a free agent. He has previously played in Major League Baseball (MLB) for the Detroit Tigers, and in Nippon Professional Baseball (NPB) for the Chiba Lotte Marines.

== Career ==
=== Amateur career ===
Sammons attended John T. Hoggard High School in Wilmington, North Carolina, and Western Carolina University, where he played college baseball for the Western Carolina Catamounts. In 2016, he played collegiate summer baseball for the Yarmouth-Dennis Red Sox of the Cape Cod Baseball League.

=== Minnesota Twins ===
The Minnesota Twins drafted Sammons in the eighth round, with the 226th overall selection, of the 2017 Major League Baseball draft. He split his first professional season between the rookie–level Elizabethton Twins and Single–A Cedar Rapids Kernels.

Sammons split 2018 between Cedar Rapids, the High–A Fort Myers Miracle, and Double–A Chattanooga Lookouts, accumulating a 6–8 record and 3.91 ERA with 101 strikeouts over 22 games (21 starts). He spent 2019 with Fort Myers and the Double–A Pensacola Blue Wahoos, registering a 9–6 record and 3.18 ERA with 131 strikeouts across 25 games (24 starts). Sammons did not play in a game in 2020 due to the cancellation of the minor league season because of the COVID-19 pandemic.

Sammons returned to action in 2021 with the Double–A Wichita Wind Surge and Triple–A St. Paul Saints. In 27 games (21 starts) for the two affiliates, he posted a 4–7 record and 6.52 ERA with 100 strikeouts across 107 2/3 innings pitched. Sammons returned to Wichita in 2022, struggling to a 3–6 record and 5.76 ERA with 59 strikeouts in 37 appearances. He was released by the Twins organization on September 5, 2022.

=== Gastonia Honey Hunters ===
On January 18, 2023, Sammons signed a minor league contract with the Houston Astros. He was released prior to the start of the season on March 26.

On April 28, 2023, Sammons signed with a Gastonia Honey Hunters of the Atlantic League of Professional Baseball. He pitched in 5 games (4 starts) for Gastonia and recorded a 2.29 ERA while striking out 26 batters in 19 2/3 innings.

=== Detroit Tigers ===
On June 4, 2023, Sammons signed a minor league contract with the Detroit Tigers. He spent the season with the Double–A Erie SeaWolves and the Triple–A Toledo Mud Hens, pitching to a combined 3–4 with a 4.83 earned run average between the two levels in 59 2/3 innings across 15 games (13 starts).

Sammons began the 2024 season with Triple–A Toledo. On July 29, 2024, Sammons was selected to the 40-man roster and promoted to the major leagues for the first time, and he made his debut that day. Sammons pitched 7 1/3 innings in his debut, the most for a Tigers pitcher in his debut since Andy van Hekken's complete game shutout. In 6 appearances during his rookie campaign, he logged a 3.62 ERA with 18 strikeouts across 27 1/3 innings pitched. On November 4, Sammons was removed from the 40–man roster and sent outright to Toledo. He elected free agency the same day.

=== Chiba Lotte Marines ===
On December 13, 2024, Sammons signed with the Chiba Lotte Marines of Nippon Professional Baseball. Sammons made his debut for the Marines on May 7, 2025, pitching two innings and allowing one run. He made 16 appearances for Lotte, compiling a 5–5 record and 3.78 ERA with 73 strikeouts across 85 2/3 innings pitched. Sammons became a free agent following the season.

=== Detroit Tigers (second stint) ===
On January 12, 2026, Sammons signed a minor league contract with the Detroit Tigers. He was assigned to the Triple-A Toledo Mud Hens to begin the regular season, posting an 0-4 record and 4.83 ERA with 35 strikeouts across 10 appearances (including eight starts). Sammons was released by the Tigers organization on June 3.
