= Bligh Madris =

American baseball player (born 1996)

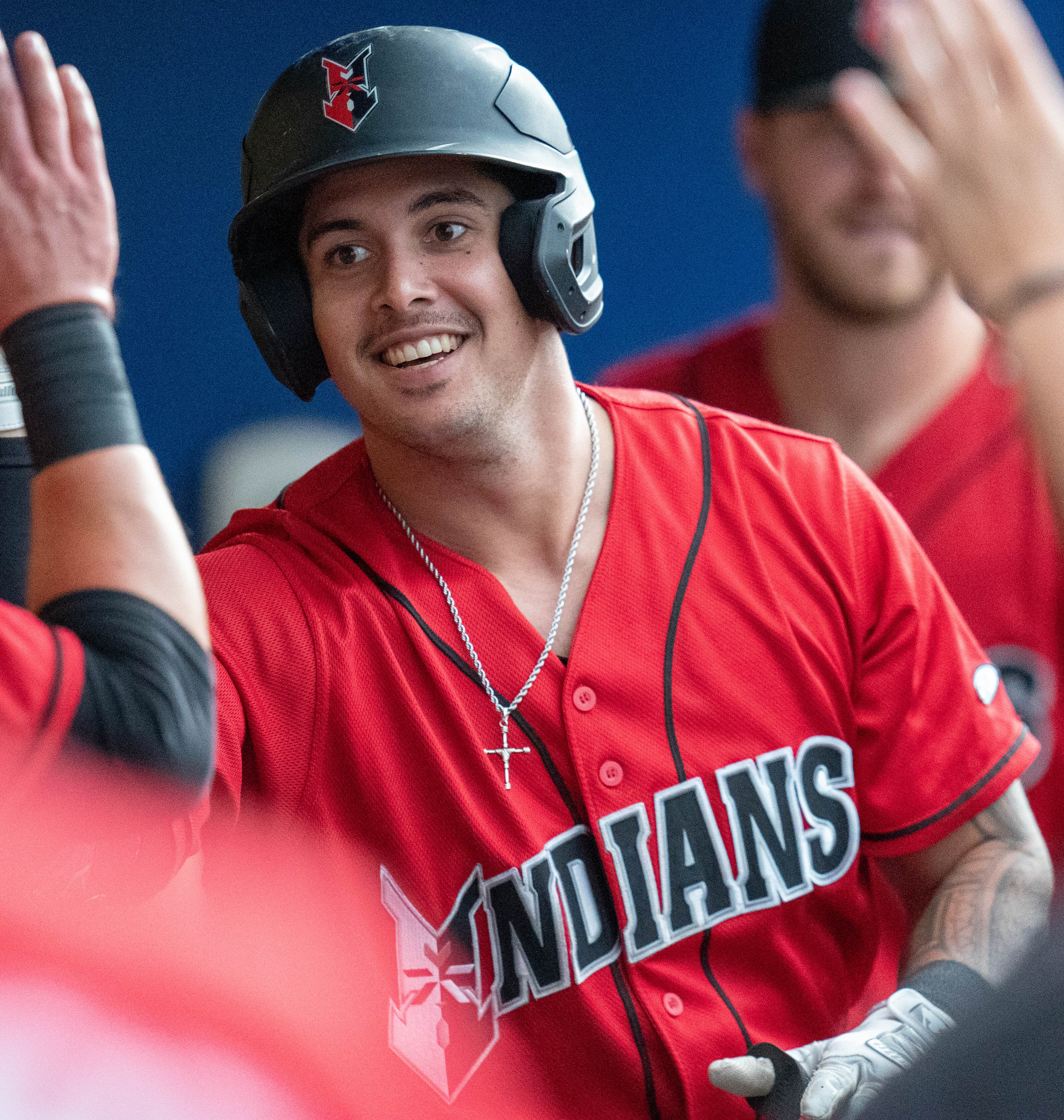
- Madris with the Indianapolis Indians in 2022

Free agent
- First baseman / Outfielder
- Born: February 29, 1996 (age 30); Las Vegas, Nevada, U.S.
- Bats: Left Throws: Right

Professional debut
- MLB: June 20, 2022, for the Pittsburgh Pirates
- KBO: July 21, 2026, for the SSG Landers

MLB statistics (through 2024 season)
- Batting average: .204
- Home runs: 2
- Runs batted in: 12

KBO statistics (through 2026 season)
- Batting average: .175
- Home runs: 4
- Runs batted in: 9
- Stats at Baseball Reference

Teams
- Pittsburgh Pirates (2022); Houston Astros (2023); Detroit Tigers (2024); SSG Landers (2026)

Bligh John Madris (born February 29, 1996) is a Palauan-American professional baseball first baseman and outfielder who is a free agent. He has previously played in Major League Baseball (MLB) for the Pittsburgh Pirates, Houston Astros, and Detroit Tigers, and in the KBO League for the SSG Landers.

== Amateur career ==
Madris attended Foothill High School in Henderson, Nevada, and played college baseball at Colorado Mesa University. As a junior at Colorado Mesa in 2017, he had a .422 batting average with 17 home runs and 67 runs batted in (RBI). He was selected by the Pittsburgh Pirates in the ninth round of the 2017 Major League Baseball draft.

== Professional career ==
=== Pittsburgh Pirates ===
Madris made his professional debut with the Class A Short Season West Virginia Black Bears, batting .270 with five home runs and 31 RBI over 56 games. He spent the 2018 season with the Class A-Advanced Bradenton Marauders with whom he hit .238 with nine home runs and 53 RBI over 103 games, and he spent 2019 with the Double-A Altoona Curve, batting .260 with eight home runs and 55 RBI over 132 games. After not playing a game in 2020 due to the cancellation of the season, he returned to Altoona to begin the 2021 season before being promoted to the Triple-A Indianapolis Indians in May. Over 114 games, he slashed .267/.353/.417 with nine home runs and 56 RBI and was named Rookie of the Year by the Indians. After the season, he played in the Puerto Rico Baseball League for the Gigantes de Carolina. He returned to the Indians to open the 2022 season.

On June 19, 2022, the Pirates announced that Madris would have his contract selected and that he would be promoted to the major leagues the next day. He made his MLB debut the next day as the starting right fielder at PNC Park versus the Chicago Cubs and recorded his first major league hit, a two-RBI single, in his first at-bat versus Caleb Kilian. Madris became the first Pirates rookie since Jason Kendall in 1996 to record three hits in his major league debut. As the Pirates continued their series against the Cubs on June 21, Madris hit his first major league home run while facing Mark Leiter Jr. He played in 39 games for the Pirates and hit .177 with one home run, seven RBI, and seven doubles. On September 13, Madris was designated for assignment.

=== Tampa Bay Rays ===
On September 16, 2022, Madris was claimed by the Tampa Bay Rays. He played in 10 games for the Triple–A Durham Bulls to close out the year, and had a .317/.370/.683 slash line with four home runs and 15 RBI. On November 15, he was designated for assignment.

On November 18, 2022, Madris was claimed off waivers by the Detroit Tigers. On December 21, he was designated for assignment following the waiver claim of Mario Feliciano.

=== Houston Astros ===
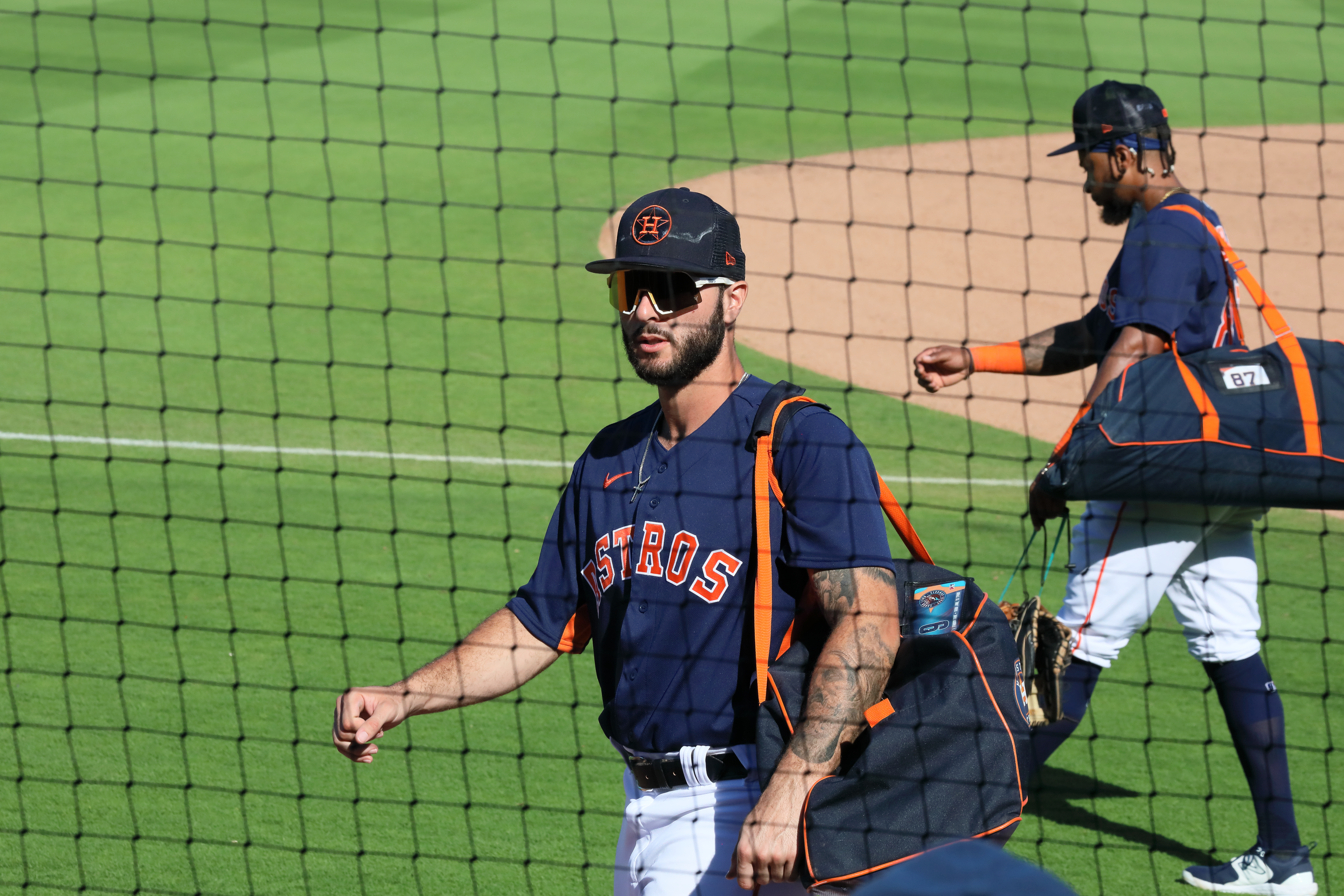
Madris with the Houston Astros at spring training in 2023

On January 3, 2023, Madris was traded to the Houston Astros in exchange for cash considerations. Madris was optioned to the Triple-A Sugar Land Space Cowboys to begin the 2023 season. On March 30, Madris was designated for assignment, after Corey Julks and César Salazar were added to the roster. On April 3, he cleared waivers and was sent outright to Sugar Land. In 60 games for Sugar Land, Madris hit .249/.363/.446 with 10 home runs, 36 RBI, and 10 stolen bases. On June 23, the Astros selected Madris' contract, adding him to the active roster. In 12 games for Houston, he went 4–for–26 (.154) with four walks. On August 8, Madris was designated for assignment following the promotion of Jon Singleton. He cleared waivers and was sent outright to Sugar Land on August 10. Madris elected free agency on October 11.

=== Detroit Tigers (second stint) ===
On November 13, 2023, Madris signed a minor league contract with the Detroit Tigers. In 80 games for the Triple–A Toledo Mud Hens, he batted .236/.339/.464 with 14 home runs, 46 RBI, and 17 stolen bases. The Tigers purchased Madris' contract on July 21, 2024, and added him to the active roster. He hit his first home run as a Tiger on August 3, against the Kansas City Royals. In 21 games for Detroit, he slashed .269/.324/.358 with one home run and five RBI. On November 4, Madris was removed from the 40–man roster and sent outright to Toledo. He elected free agency the same day.

On November 8, 2024, Madris re-signed with the Tigers on a minor league contract. He made 60 appearances split between Toledo and the Single-A Lakeland Flying Tigers, batting a cumulative .238/.328/.410 with eight home runs, 46 RBI, and three stolen bases. Madris was released by the Tigers organization on August 19, 2025.

=== St. Louis Cardinals ===
On February 5, 2026, Madris signed a minor league contract with the St. Louis Cardinals. In 71 games with the Triple-A Memphis Redbirds he batted .277/.389/.519 with 14 home runs, 52 RBI, and four stolen bases. He was released on July 12, so he could pursue an opportunity in the KBO League.

=== SSG Landers ===
On July 16, 2026, Madris signed a six-week, $100,000 contract with the SSG Landers of the KBO League as an injury replacement for Guillermo Heredia. He played in 17 games for the Landers and batted .175 with four home runs and nine RBI.

=== St. Louis Cardinals (second stint) ===
On August 19, 2026, Madris re-signed with the St. Louis Cardinals on a minor league contract. He elected free agency on November 2.

== Personal life ==
Madris is of Palauan descent. Upon making his MLB debut, he became the first person of Palauan descent to play in the major leagues.
