= Trey Sweeney =

American baseball player (born 2000)

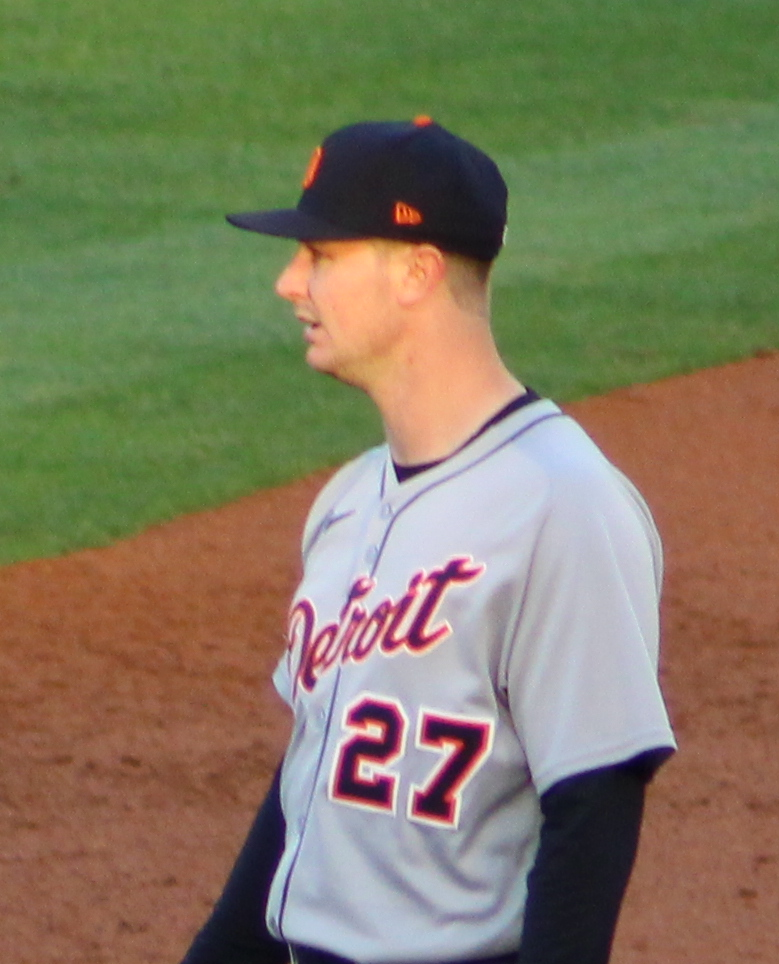
- Sweeney with the Detroit Tigers in 2025

Free agent
- Shortstop
- Born: April 24, 2000 (age 26); Louisville, Kentucky, U.S.
- Bats: Left Throws: Right

MLB debut
- August 16, 2024, for the Detroit Tigers

MLB statistics (through 2025 season)
- Batting average: .202
- Home runs: 10
- Runs batted in: 49
- Stats at Baseball Reference

Teams
- Detroit Tigers (2024–2025)

Trey Thomas Sweeney (born April 24, 2000) is an American professional baseball shortstop who is a free agent. He has previously played in Major League Baseball (MLB) for the Detroit Tigers. He played college baseball for the Eastern Illinois Panthers. He was selected by the New York Yankees in the first round of the 2021 MLB draft and traded to the Los Angeles Dodgers in 2023 and the Tigers in 2024. He made his MLB debut with the Tigers in 2024.

== Amateur career ==
Sweeney grew up in Louisville, Kentucky, and attended St. Xavier High School. As a senior, he batted .389 with 41 RBIs and 18 stolen bases as St. Xavier won the state championship. Sweeney committed to play baseball at Eastern Illinois University, which was the only Division I school to offer him a scholarship.

Sweeney played college baseball for the Eastern Illinois Panthers for three seasons. He became a starter as a freshman and was named to the Ohio Valley Conference (OVC) All-Freshman team after batting .266 with 61 total bases, 27 runs scored, and 24 runs batted in (RBIs). After the season, Sweeney played collegiate summer baseball for the Lafayette Aviators of the Prospect League and was named a league All-Star after slashing .354/.453/.524 in 257 plate appearances. He batted .351 as a sophomore before the season was cut short due to the coronavirus pandemic. As a redshirt sophomore, Sweeney was named the OVC Player of the Year after he hit .382 with 14 home runs and 58 RBIs and was a finalist for the Brooks Wallace Award. Due to his performance he became rated as one of the best college batting prospects in the 2021 Major League Baseball draft.

== Professional career ==
=== New York Yankees ===
The New York Yankees selected Sweeney in the first round, with the 20th overall pick, in the 2021 Major League Baseball draft. On July 19, 2021, Sweeney signed with the Yankees. He was assigned to the Rookie-level Florida Complex League Yankees to start his professional career and was later promoted to the Tampa Tarpons of the Low-A Southeast. Over 32 games between the two teams, Sweeney slashed .261/.384/.584 with seven home runs and 14 RBIs. He opened the 2022 season with the Hudson Valley Renegades of the High-A South Atlantic League. Sweeney was promoted to the Double-A Somerset Patriots after batting .241 with 14 home runs and 51 RBIs in 100 games played with Hudson Valley.

=== Los Angeles Dodgers ===
On December 11, 2023, the Yankees traded Sweeney to the Los Angeles Dodgers in exchange for Victor González and Jorbit Vivas. Sweeney was selected to participate in the inaugural "Spring Breakout" minor league showcase during spring training 2024 and he was assigned to the Triple–A Oklahoma City Baseball Club to start the season, where he hit .255 in 96 games with 13 homers and 62 RBI.

=== Detroit Tigers ===
On July 30, 2024, the Dodgers traded Sweeney and Thayron Liranzo to the Detroit Tigers in exchange for Jack Flaherty. In 11 games for the Triple–A Toledo Mud Hens, he batted .381/.447/.667 with two home runs, nine RBI, four stolen bases. On August 16, Sweeney was selected to the 40-man roster and promoted to the major leagues for the first time. He made his Major League debut the same day, against the New York Yankees, the team by which he was originally drafted. Sweeney played 36 games for the Tigers during his rookie campaign, hitting .218 with four home runs and 17 RBI. Sweeney made 118 appearances for the Tigers during the 2025 season, slashing .196/.258/.291 with six home runs, 32 RBI, and three stolen bases.

Sweeney began the 2026 season on the injured list due to a right shoulder strain. He was transferred to the 60-day injured list on April 11, 2026. On June 5, the Tigers announced that Sweeney underwent surgery on his right shoulder and that he would miss the remainder of the 2026 season. On November 17, 2026, he was designated for assignment by the Tigers. Three days later, he was non-tendered and became a free agent.
