= Colt Keith =

American baseball player (born 2001)

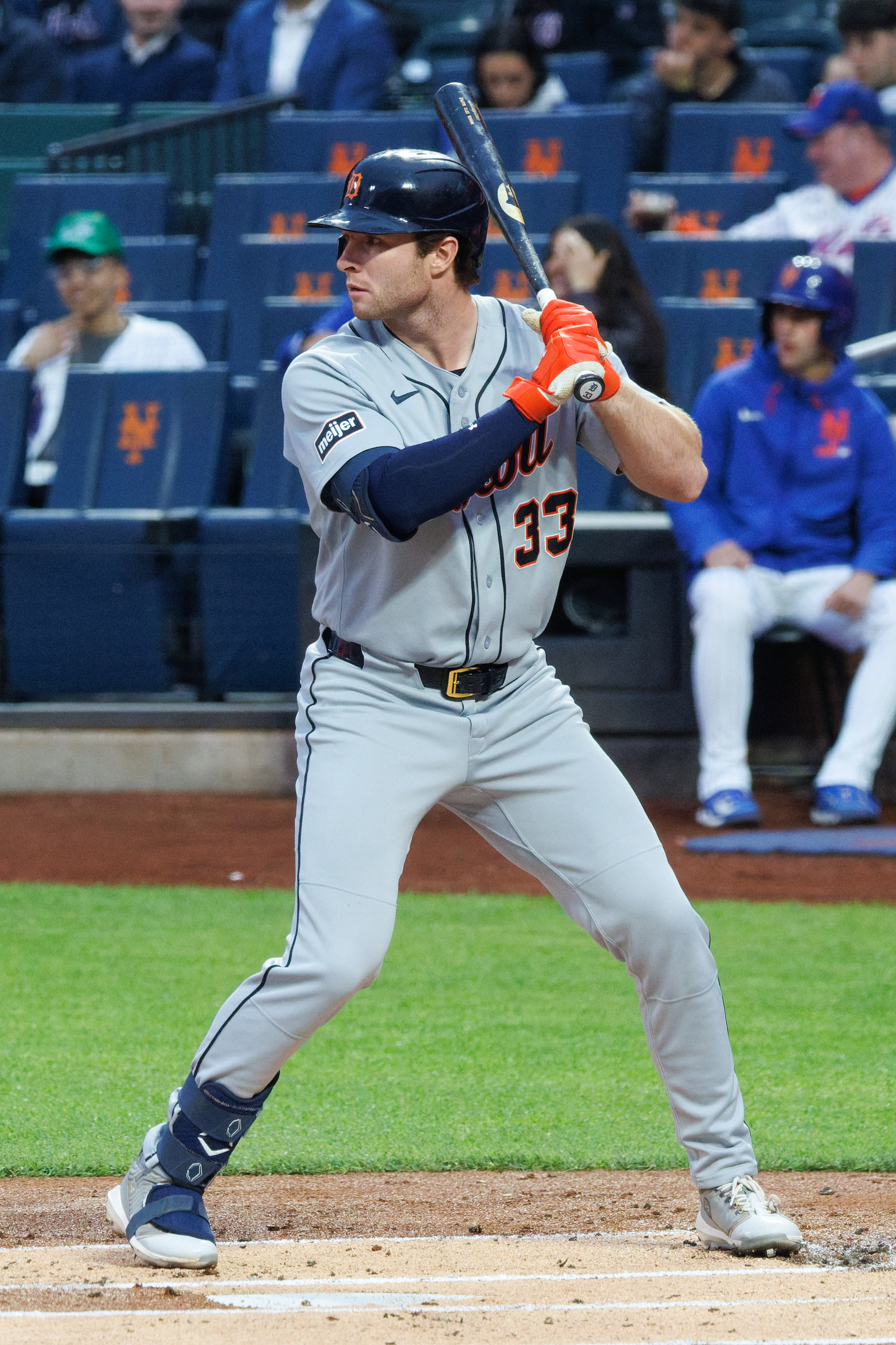
- Keith with the Tigers in 2026

Detroit Tigers – No. 33
- Infielder
- Born: August 14, 2001 (age 25); Zanesville, Ohio, U.S.
- Bats: Left Throws: Right

MLB debut
- March 28, 2024, for the Detroit Tigers

MLB statistics (through 2026 season)
- Batting average: .258
- Home runs: 36
- Runs batted in: 142
- Stats at Baseball Reference

Teams
- Detroit Tigers (2024–present)

Colten Thomas Keith (born August 14, 2001) is an American professional baseball infielder for the Detroit Tigers of Major League Baseball (MLB). He made his MLB debut in 2024.

== Amateur career ==
Keith grew up in Ohio before moving to Utah at the age of eight. When he was twelve years old, he and his family then moved again to Buckeye, Arizona, where he attended Verrado High School. In order to follow his mother's job in the oil and gas industry, he transferred to Biloxi High School in Biloxi, Mississippi, as a junior in 2019.

He was named the Gatorade Baseball Player of the Year for the state of Mississippi as a junior after batting .527 with nine home runs and 49 RBIs. As a senior in 2020, he batted .269 with eight RBIs before the season was cancelled due to the COVID-19 pandemic. He was drafted by the Detroit Tigers in the fifth round of the 2020 Major League Baseball draft. He signed with the Tigers rather than play college baseball at Arizona State University.

== Professional career ==
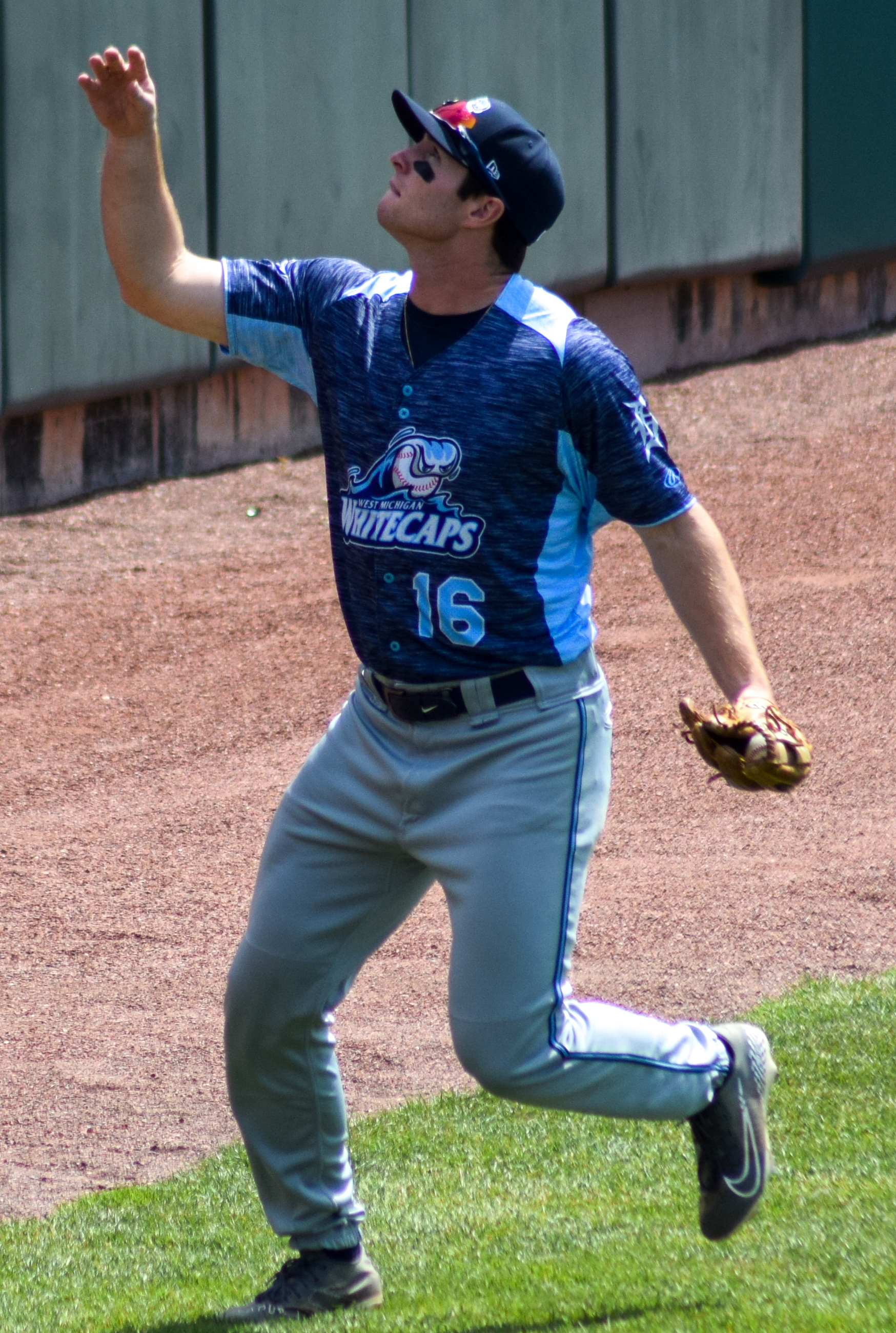
Keith with the West Michigan Whitecaps in 2022

Keith made his professional debut in 2021 with the Florida Complex League Tigers before being promoted to the Lakeland Flying Tigers and West Michigan Whitecaps. Over 65 games between the three teams, he slashed .286/.396/.789 with two home runs, 32 RBI, eight doubles, and five triples. He opened the 2022 season with West Michigan, playing 48 games with a slash of .301/.370/.544 with nine home runs and 31 RBI. He also played with the Salt River Rafters in the Arizona Fall League, where he broke out hitting .344/.463/.541 with three home runs and 10 RBI in 19 games.

Before entering the 2023 season, Keith was ranked the No. 1 Tigers prospect and No. 93 overall. Keith began the 2023 season with the Double-A Erie SeaWolves. On May 16, 2023, in a game against the Harrisburg Senators, Keith went 6-for-6 with 2 home runs while hitting for the cycle. In 59 games with Erie, he hit .325/.391/.585 with 14 home runs and 50 RBI. On June 26, Keith was promoted to the Triple-A Toledo Mud Hens. On the same day, he was selected to the 2023 All-Star Futures Game. In 67 games with Toledo, he batted .287/.369/.521 with 13 home runs and 51 RBIs. Baseball America named him the 2023 Tigers Minor League Player of the Year.

On January 28, 2024, Keith and the Tigers signed a six-year contract worth $28,642,500 that includes club options for the 2030, 2031, and 2032 seasons. On March 21, he was named to the Tigers' Opening Day roster. Keith made his MLB debut on Opening Day, recording an infield single for his first career hit. In his rookie season, Keith hit .260 with 13 home runs and 61 RBI.

Following their offseason signing of Gleyber Torres, the Tigers announced that Keith would be utilized as a first baseman in 2025. He also played games at second base, third base and designated hitter. For the 2025 season, he batted .256/.333/.413 with 13 home runs and 45 RBI.

After a considerable homer drought to start the 2026 season, Keith hit his first on June 11. On June 15, he hit three home runs in a single game against the Houston Astros, becoming the youngest Tigers player (24) to have a three-homer game since Al Kaline did so as a 20-year old on April 17, 1955. He finished the 2026 season batting .258/.322/.406 with 10 home runs and 36 RBI.
