= Buddy Kennedy =

American baseball player (born 1998)

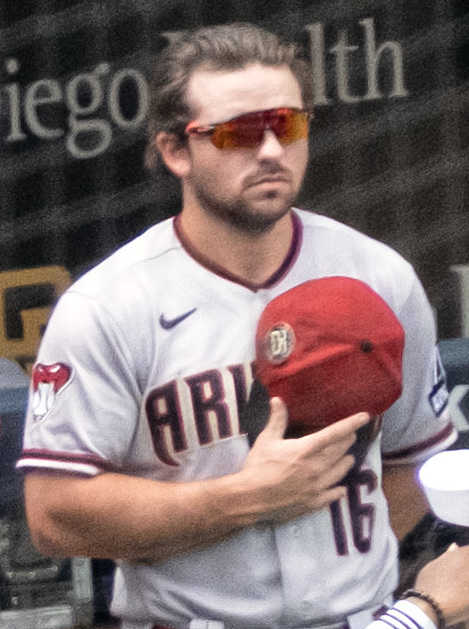
- Kennedy with the Arizona Diamondbacks in 2023

Free agent
- Infielder
- Born: October 5, 1998 (age 28); Millville, New Jersey, U.S.
- Bats: Right Throws: Right

MLB debut
- June 17, 2022, for the Arizona Diamondbacks

MLB statistics (through 2026 season)
- Batting average: .165
- Home runs: 2
- Runs batted in: 21
- Stats at Baseball Reference

Teams
- Arizona Diamondbacks (2022–2023); Detroit Tigers (2024); Philadelphia Phillies (2024–2025); Toronto Blue Jays (2025); Los Angeles Dodgers (2025); San Francisco Giants (2026); Seattle Mariners (2026); San Francisco Giants (2026)

Clifton Lewis "Buddy" Kennedy (born October 5, 1998) is an American professional baseball infielder who is a free agent. He has previously played in Major League Baseball (MLB) for the Arizona Diamondbacks, Detroit Tigers, Philadelphia Phillies, Toronto Blue Jays, Los Angeles Dodgers, San Francisco Giants, and Seattle Mariners.

== Amateur career ==
Born and raised in Millville, New Jersey, Kennedy attended Millville Senior High School. There, he played baseball and batted .493 with six home runs as a senior in 2017.

He was selected by the Arizona Diamondbacks in the fifth round of the 2017 Major League Baseball draft and signed for $550,000, forgoing his commitment to play college baseball at the University of North Carolina.

== Professional career ==
=== Arizona Diamondbacks ===
Kennedy made his professional debut with the Arizona League Diamondbacks, batting .270 with nine doubles, eight triples, and twenty RBIs over fifty games. In 2018, he played with the Missoula Osprey with whom he had a slash line of a .327 batting average, .396 on base percentage and .465 slugging percentage with four home runs and 32 RBIs over 57 games. For the 2019 season, he played for the Kane County Cougars, hitting .262 with seven home runs and 49 RBIs over 101 games. He did not play a minor league game in 2020 after the season was cancelled due to the COVID-19 pandemic. Kennedy began the 2021 season with the Hillsboro Hops and was promoted to the Amarillo Sod Poodles in mid-June. Over 96 games between the two clubs, Kennedy slashed .290/.384/.523 with 22 home runs, sixty RBIs, and 16 stolen bases. He was selected to play in the Arizona Fall League for the Salt River Rafters after the season, batting .236 in 16 games.

Kennedy was assigned to the Reno Aces of the Triple-A Pacific Coast League to begin the 2022 season, where he hit .261 in 93 games with seven homers and 40 RBI. On June 17, the Diamondbacks selected his contract and he made his MLB debut that night as the starting designated hitter versus the Minnesota Twins. He recorded his first MLB hit that night with a single off Devin Smeltzer. On June 19, he recorded his first MLB home run, a grand slam off Caleb Thielbar of the Minnesota Twins. In 30 games for the Diamondbacks, he had a .217 batting average. He was sent outright off the roster and back to the minors on November 11.

Kennedy was assigned to Reno to begin the 2023 season, where he played in 87 games and hit .318/.447/.480 with five home runs and 46 RBI. On August 12, the Diamondbacks again selected Kennedy's contract, adding him back to the major league roster. In 10 games for Arizona, he went 4-for-24 (.167) with one RBI. On September 6, he was designated for assignment to make room on the roster for Seby Zavala, who was claimed off waivers.

=== Oakland Athletics ===
On September 9, 2023, Kennedy was claimed off waivers by the Oakland Athletics. In 11 games for the Triple-A Las Vegas Aviators, Kennedy hit .216/.326/.216 with no home runs, four RBI, and six walks.

=== Detroit Tigers ===
On October 25, 2023, Kennedy was claimed off waivers by the St. Louis Cardinals. However, he was designated for assignment on February 27, 2024 and claimed off waivers by the Detroit Tigers on February 29. He was optioned to the Triple-A Toledo Mud Hens to begin the 2024 season, where he played in 39 games with a .234 batting average. The Tigers called up Kennedy on April 20 to replace Gio Urshela, who was placed on the injured list. In six games for Detroit, he went 2-for-10 with one home run and four RBI. On June 3, Kennedy was once more designated for assignment.

=== Philadelphia Phillies ===
On June 7, 2024, Kennedy was traded to the Philadelphia Phillies in exchange for cash considerations. On September 9, in his third game with the Phillies, Philadelphia fans chanted "Buddy," repeatedly as Kennedy walked in a pinch-hit appearance, one batter before Kody Clemens hit a bases loaded walk-off single in a 2–1 win over the Tampa Bay Rays. In eight appearances for the Phillies, Kennedy went 2-for-11 (.182) with two RBI and two walks. He also played in 67 games for the Triple-A Lehigh Valley IronPigs, where he batted .294 with 10 homers and 35 RBI.

Kennedy, the final cut from the Phillies 2025 Opening Day roster, was designated for assignment on March 27. On April 1, he cleared waivers and elected free agency in lieu of an outright assignment to the minors. However, he re-signed with the organization on a minor league contract the same day. In 61 appearances for Lehigh, Kennedy batted .283/.388/.447 with eight home runs, 40 RBI, and three stolen bases. On June 19, the Phillies added him back to their active major league roster. In four appearances for Philadelphia, he went 0-for-7 with one walk and he was once more designated for assignment on June 30. He elected free agency after clearing waivers on July 5.

=== Toronto Blue Jays ===
On July 9, 2025, Kennedy signed a minor league contract with the Toronto Blue Jays. In 16 appearances for the Triple-A Buffalo Bisons, he batted .207/.309/.259 with five RBI and nine walks. On August 5, he was added to the Blue Jays active roster, and made two appearances for Toronto, going 1-for-5 (.200) with a walk. Kennedy was designated for assignment by the Blue Jays on August 12.

=== Los Angeles Dodgers ===
On August 15, 2025, Kennedy was claimed off waivers by the Los Angeles Dodgers. Kennedy had one hit in 17 at-bats for the Dodgers across seven games, with one RBI. He was designated for assignment on August 25. He cleared waivers on August 28, and elected to become a free agent rather than accept an outright assignment to the minors.

=== Toronto Blue Jays (second stint) ===
On September 1, 2025, Kennedy signed a minor league contract to return to the Toronto Blue Jays organization. He elected free agency following the season on November 6.

=== San Francisco Giants ===
On December 15, 2025, Kennedy signed a minor league contract with the San Francisco Giants. He made 48 appearances for the Triple-A Sacramento River Cats to begin the regular season, slashing .321./424/.543 with eight home runs, 33 RBI, and five stolen bases. On June 1, 2026, the Giants selected Kennedy's contract, adding him to their active roster. He made seven appearances for San Francisco, going 0-for-7 with one walk. Kennedy was designated for assignment by the Giants on June 28.

=== Seattle Mariners ===
On June 28, 2026, Kennedy was traded to the Seattle Mariners in exchange for cash considerations. He made five appearances for Seattle, going 1–for–10 (.100) with one walk. Kennedy was designated for assignment on July 28.

=== San Francisco Giants (second stint) ===
On August 2, 2026, Kennedy was claimed off waivers by the San Francisco Giants. In 20 total appearances for San Francesco, he posted a .121/.237/.121 slash line with one RBI and four walks. Kennedy was designated for assignment by the Giants on August 27. He went unclaimed on waivers and elected free agency rather than accept a minor league assignment.

=== Washington Nationals ===
On September 2, 2026, Kennedy signed a minor league contract with the Washington Nationals. In 12 games with Triple-A Rochester Red Wings he batted .174/.291/.283 with one home run, 7 RBIs and one stolen base. He elected free agency on November 2.

== Personal life ==
Kennedy is close friends with Los Angeles Angels outfielder Mike Trout and trains with him in the off-season. Kennedy's grandfather, Don Money, played in MLB for the Philadelphia Phillies and Milwaukee Brewers.
