= Brenan Hanifee =

American baseball player (born 1998)

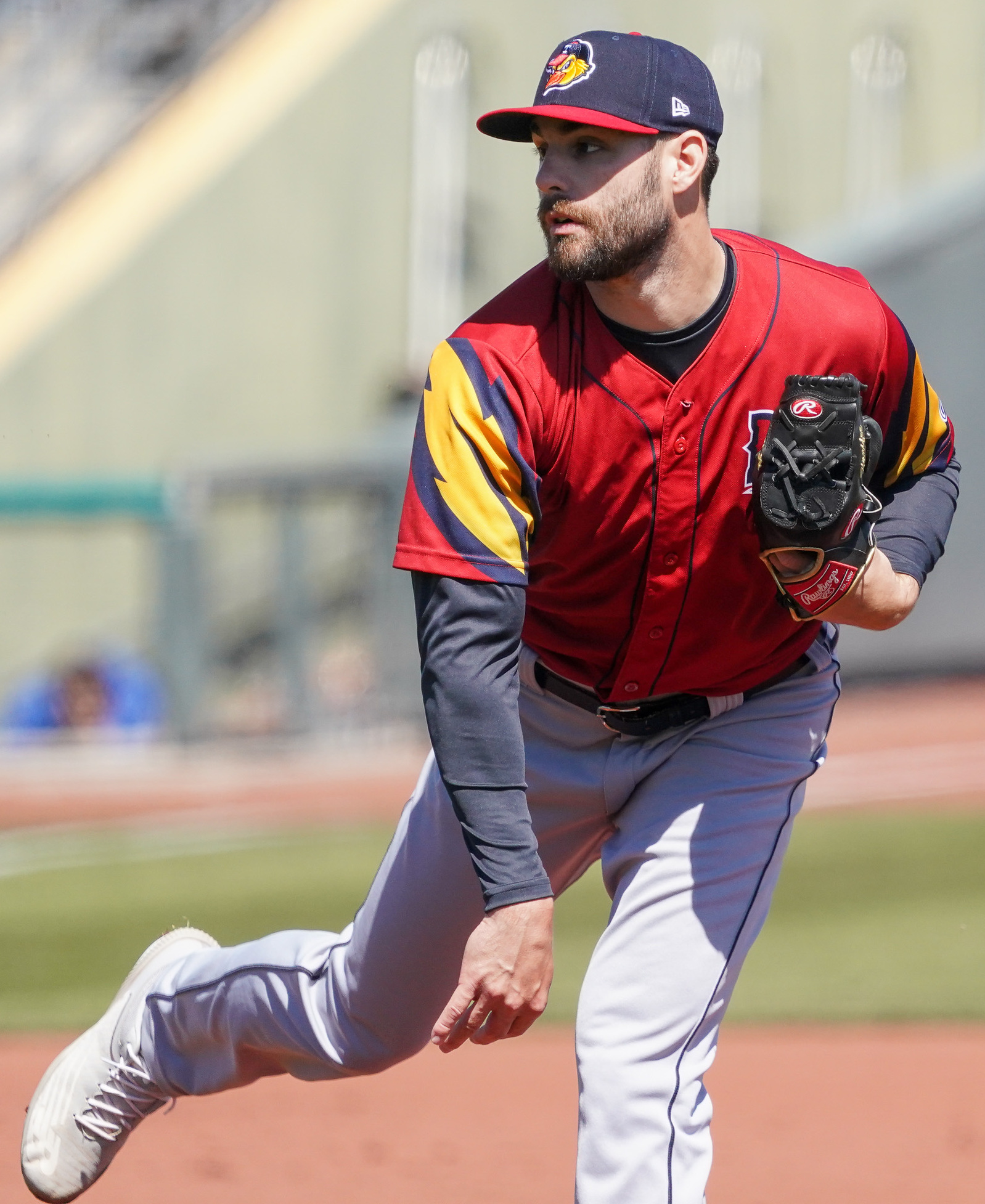
- Hanifee with the Toledo Mud Hens in 2023

Detroit Tigers – No. 75
- Pitcher
- Born: May 29, 1998 (age 28); Harrisonburg, Virginia, U.S.
- Bats: Right Throws: Right

MLB debut
- September 21, 2023, for the Detroit Tigers

MLB statistics (through August 6, 2026)
- Win–loss record: 4–5
- Earned run average: 3.19
- Strikeouts: 76
- Stats at Baseball Reference

Teams
- Detroit Tigers (2023–present)

Brenan Reese Hanifee (born May 29, 1998) is an American professional baseball pitcher for the Detroit Tigers of Major League Baseball (MLB).

== Career ==
=== Baltimore Orioles ===
Hanifee played baseball at Turner Ashby High School. He was drafted by the Baltimore Orioles in the fourth round, with the 121st overall selection, of the 2016 Major League Baseball draft. Hanifee made his professional debut in 2017 with the Low–A Aberdeen IronBirds, starting 12 games and posting a 7–3 record and 2.75 ERA with 44 strikeouts.

He spent the 2018 season with the Single–A Delmarva Shorebirds, starting 23 contests and logging an 8–6 record and 2.86 ERA with 85 strikeouts across 132 innings pitched. In 2019, Hanifee played for the High–A Frederick Keys, making 24 appearances and registering a 9–10 record and 4.60 ERA with 78 strikeouts across 129 innings of work. He did not play in a game in 2020 due to the cancellation of the minor league season because of the COVID-19 pandemic.

On May 26, 2021, Hanifee underwent Tommy John surgery, causing him to miss the entire 2021 season. He returned from injury in 2022, playing for the Double–A Bowie Baysox, Aberdeen, and the rookie–level Florida Complex League Orioles. In 13 starts between the three affiliates, Hanifee accumulated a 3.92 ERA with 40 strikeouts across 43 2/3 innings pitched. He elected free agency following the season on November 10, 2022.

=== Detroit Tigers ===
On December 5, 2022, Hanifee signed a minor league contract with the Detroit Tigers. He was assigned to the Triple–A Toledo Mud Hens, for whom he made 25 appearances (13 starts) and logged a 2–8 record and 4.38 ERA with 82 strikeouts.

On September 20, 2023, Hanifee was selected to the 40-man roster and promoted to the major leagues for the first time. In three games for Detroit, he allowed three runs on eight hits with three strikeouts in five innings of work. On November 14, Hanifee was designated for assignment by Detroit after multiple prospects were added to the roster. Three days later Hanifee became a free agent when he was not tendered a contract from the Tigers.

On December 8, 2023, Hanifee re-signed with the Tigers on a minor league contract. In 34 appearances for Toledo, he logged a 5.17 ERA with 53 strikeouts across 47 innings pitched. On August 1, 2024, the Tigers selected Hanifee's contract, adding him to their active roster. He made 21 appearances down the stretch for Detroit, recording a 1.84 ERA with 23 strikeouts across 29 1/3 innings pitched.

Hanifee made 54 appearances out of the bullpen for the Tigers during the 2025 campaign, accumulating a 3-3 record and 3.00 ERA with 40 strikeouts across 60 innings of work.

Hanifee was optioned to Triple-A Toledo to begin the 2026 season. He was called up on April 26, 2026, when pitcher Connor Seabold was placed on the injured list.
