= 2026 Detroit Tigers season =

Major League Baseball season

2026 Detroit Tigers
- League: American League
- Division: Central
- Ballpark: Comerica Park
- City: Detroit, Michigan
- Record: 76–86 (.469)
- Divisional place: 4th
- Owners: Christopher Ilitch; Ilitch family trust
- President of baseball operations: Scott Harris
- General manager: Jeff Greenberg
- Manager: A. J. Hinch
- Television: MLB Local Media; Jason Benetti/Dan Dickerson (play-by-play); Andy Dirks/Dan Petry/Todd Jones/Carlos Peña (color commentary); Daniella Bruce (reporter); Johnny Kane (host)
- Radio: Detroit Tigers Radio Network; Dan Dickerson/Greg Gania (play-by-play); Bobby Scales/Dan Petry/Andy Dirks (color commentary)
- Stats: ESPN.com; Baseball Reference

The 2026 Detroit Tigers season was the team's 126th season and its 27th at Comerica Park. This was the Tigers' sixth season under manager A. J. Hinch.

After a subpar first half of the season, the Tigers had a mini-teardown and sent star pitcher Tarik Skubal to the Dodgers in exchange prospects Zahir Hope, River Ryan and Brady Smith at the trade deadline. Longtime rotation stalwart and former No. 2 overall pick Casey Mize was also sent to San Diego for prospects Kash Mayfield and Jackson Wolf. On September 19, the Tigers ensured their first losing record since the 2023 season. On the following day, they were eliminated from the playoffs for the first time since that 2023 season.

On September 26, Justin Verlander, in his first season back with the team since being traded in 2017 and the final season of his career, pitched his last game.

== Roster moves ==
=== Trades ===
- On December 12, 2025, the Tigers traded pitcher Chase Lee to the Toronto Blue Jays for minor league pitcher Johan Simon.
- On January 6, 2026, the Tigers traded Justyn-Henry Malloy to the Tampa Bay Rays for cash considerations.
- On March 30, 2026, the Tigers traded pitcher Dylan Smith to the San Francisco Giants for cash considerations.
- On May 1, 2026, the Washington Nationals traded infielder Zack Short to the Tigers for cash considerations or a player to be named later. His minor league contract was selected by the Tigers two days later.
- On May 27, 2026, the Tigers traded pitcher Connor Seabold to the Toronto Blue Jays for minor league pitcher Juanmi Vasquez.
- On June 10, 2026, the Milwaukee Brewers traded minor league pitcher Jacob Waguespack to the Tigers for a player to be named later and cash considerations. the Tigers selected his minor league contract and added him to the active roster two days later.
- On July 13, 2026, the Tigers traded outfielder Jahmai Jones to the Boston Red Sox for a player to be named later. On August 1, the Red Sox traded minor league pitcher Jojo Ingrassia to the Tigers to complete the deal.
- On July 30, 2026, the Tigers traded catcher Jake Rogers to the Baltimore Orioles for minor league pitcher Zane Barnhart.
- On August 2, 2026, the Tigers traded pitcher Tarik Skubal to the Los Angeles Dodgers for outfielder Zahir Hope and pitchers River Ryan and Brady Smith.
- On August 3, 2025, the Tigers traded pitcher Casey Mize and infielder Gage Workman to the San Diego Padres for minor league pitchers Kash Mayfield and Jackson Wolf.

=== Releases ===
- On October 14, 2025, minor league catcher Tomás Nido and minor league outfielder Akil Badoo refused their minor league assignment and elected free agency. Nido resigned to a minor league contract on October 30. Badoo signed a one-year contract with the Milwaukee Brewers on December 11.
- On November 2, 2025, pitchers Alex Cobb, Kyle Finnegan, Tommy Kahnle, Rafael Montero and Chris Paddack along with infielder Gleyber Torres elected free agency. On November 18, Torres accepted the $22.025 million qualifying offer to remain with the Tigers in 2026. On December 20, Finnegan resigned with the Tigers. On February 12, 2026, Paddack signed a minor league contract with the Miami Marlins. On February 13, 2026, Montero signed a minor league contract with the New York Yankees. On March 18, 2026, Kahnle signed a minor league contract with the Boston Red Sox.
- On November 4, 2025, the Tigers declined the option for minor league pitcher Randy Dobnak making him a free agent. On November 11,he signed a minor league contract with the Seattle Mariners.
- On November 6, 2025, the Tigers declined options on pitchers Paul Sewald, José Urquidy, making them free agents. On February 11, 2026, Urquidy signed a minor league contract with the Pittsburgh Pirates. On February 13, 2026, Sewald signed a minor league contract with the Arizona Diamondbacks.
- On November 6, 2025, minor league infielder Kevin Newman elected free agency. He signed a minor league contract with the Kansas City Royals on December 16, 2025.
- On November 12, 2025, the Tigers designated pitcher Alex Lange for assignment. The Tigers released Lange on November 18 and he signed a one-year contract with the Kansas City Royals two days later.
- On November 18, 2025, the Tigers designated the following pitchers for assignment: Jason Foley, Sean Guenther, Tanner Rainey, and Tyler Mattison along with recently acquired pitchers Dugan Darnell and Jack Little. They were all non-tendered on November 21 and became free agents. The Tigers resigned Rainey to a minor league contract on November 26. The San Francisco Giants signed Foley to a one-year contract on December 16. The Tigers resigned Darnell, Guenther, Mattison and Little to minor league contracts in December, 2026.
- On November 21, 2025, the Tigers did not tender a contract to infielder Andy Ibanez, making him a free agent. He signed a one-year contract with the Los Angeles Dodgers on January 13.
- On December 20, 2025, the Tigers designated outfielder Justyn-Henry Malloy for assignment. He was traded to the Rays on January 6.
- On March 21, 2026, the Tigers released minor league outfielder Austin Slater after he failed to make the opening day roster. He signed a one-year contract with the Miami Marlins on March 24.
- On March 25, 2026, the Tigers designated pitcher Dylan Smith for assignment. He was traded to the Giants on March 30.
- On May 3, 2026, the Tigers designated pitcher Grant Holman for assignment. He was claimed off waivers by the Philadelphia Phillies on May 7.
- On May 5, 2026, the Tigers designated infielder Zack Short for assignment. Short was outrighted to Triple-A Toledo Mud Hens on May 7. Short refused the assignment and became a free agent on May 8 then resigned with the Tigers on a major league contract.
- On May 24, 2026, the Tigers designated pitcher Connor Seabold for assignment. He was traded to the Blue Jays three days later.
- On June 3, 2026, the Tigers released pitchers Bryan Sammons and Dugan Darnell from their minor league contracts.
- On June 12, 2026, the Tigers designated infielder Zack Short for assignment for the second time this season. He was claimed off waivers by the New York Mets three days later.
- On June 24, 2026, the Tigers released pitcher Konnor Pilkington from his minor league contract. He signed a minor league contract with the Washington Nationals on July 2.
- On July 9, 2026, the Tigers designated outfielder Jahmai Jones for assignment. He was traded to the Red Sox four days later.
- On July 23, 2026, the Tigers released minor league catcher Tomás Nido. On August 27, 2026, Nido signed a minor league contract with the Boston Red Sox.
- On July 28, 2026, the Tigers designated catcher Jake Rogers for assignment. He was traded to the Orioles two days later.
- On July 31, 2026, the Tigers designated pitcher Andre Granillo for assignment and released pitcher Sean Guenther from his minor league contract. Granillo was outrighted to Triple-A Toledo on August 4, after clearing waivers.
- On August 8, 2026, the Tigers released pitcher Scott Effross from his minor league contract. Effros signed a minor league deal with the Seattle Mariners two days later.
- On August 10, 2026, the Tigers released outfielder Tyler Gentry from his minor league contract. Gentry signed with the Kansas City Monarchs of the American Association of Professional Baseball four days later.
- On August 12, 2026, the Tigers designated pitcher Troy Watson for assignment. He was claimed off waivers by the Seattle Mariners three days later.
- On August 16, 2026, the Tigers designated outfielder Trei Cruz for assignment. Cruz was outrighted to Triple-A Toledo on August 18, after clearing waivers.
- On August 18, 2026, the Tigers released pitcher Tyler Owens from his minor league contract. On September 3, 2026, Owens signed a minor league contract with the Pittsburgh Pirates.
- On August 23, 2026, the Tigers designated outfielder James Outman for assignment. Outman was outrighted to Triple-A Toledo on August 25, after clearing waivers.
- On August 24, 2026, the Tigers designated pitcher Ricky Vanasco for assignment. He was claimed off waivers by the Atlanta Braves two days later.
- On August 25, 2026, the Tigers released pitcher Nick Sandlin from his minor league contract. He was resigned to a minor league contract by the Tigers three days later.
- On August 31, 2026, the Tigers designated pitcher Tanner Rainey for assignment. Rainey was outrighted to Triple-A Toledo on September 2, after clearing waivers.

=== Signings ===
- On November 6, 2025, the Tigers claimed pitcher Jack Little off waivers from the Pittsburgh Pirates. Little was designated for assignment on November 18 and released three days later.
- On November 12, 2025, the Tigers claimed pitcher Dugan Darnell off waivers from the Pittsburgh Pirates. Darnell was designated for assignment on November 18 and released three days later.
- On November 18, 2025, the Tigers selected the contracts of pitcher Jake Miller, catchers Eduardo Valencia and Thayron Liranzo, infielder Hao-Yu Lee and outfielder Trei Cruz to protect them from the Rule 5 draft.
- On December 16, 2025, the Tigers signed pitchers Enmanuel De Jesus and Cole Waites and resigned pitchers Sean Guenther and Jack Little to minor league contracts.
- On December 16, 2025, the Tigers signed pitcher Drew Anderson to a one-year $7 million contract with a club option for 2027.
- On December 17, 2025, the Tigers signed pitcher Kenley Jansen to a one-year $9 million contract with a $2 million buyout on a club option for 2027.
- On December 17, 2025, the Tigers signed pitcher Scott Effross to a minor league contract with an invitation to spring training. He was released from his minor league contract on August 8.
- On December 20, 2025, the Tigers signed pitcher Kyle Finnegan to a two-year $16.75 million contract with a mutual option for 2028.
- On December 23, 2025, the Tigers signed pitcher Burch Smith to a minor league contract and invited him to spring training. The Tigers selected his contract on April 22, 2026, and added him to the active roster.
- On January 6, 2026, the Tigers agreed on 1-year contracts to avoid arbitration with seven players: pitcher Casey Mize ($6.15 million), outfielder Riley Greene ($5 million), utility player Zach McKinstry ($4.2 million), first baseman Spencer Torkelson ($4.075 million), pitcher Will Vest ($3.95 million), outfielder Kerry Carpenter ($3.275 million) and pitcher Tyler Holton ($1.575 million).
- On January 12, 2026, the Tigers signed pitcher Bryan Sammons to a minor league contract. He was released from his minor league contract on June 3.
- On January 16, 2026, the Tigers signed outfielder Corey Julks to a minor league contract with an invitation lo spring training.
- On February 7, 2026, the Tigers signed pitcher Konnor Pilkington to a minor league contract with an invitation lo spring training. He was released from his minor league contract on June 24.
- On February 10, 2026, the Tigers signed pitcher Framber Valdez to a three-year, $115 million contract. The deal includes a $20 million signing bonus, an opt-out for the 2028 season, and an unspecified amount of deferred money.
- On February 10, 2026, Justin Verlander signed a one-year, $13 million contract to return to the Tigers. The deal includes $2 million for the 2026 season, with the rest deferred.
- On February 12, 2026, the Tigers signed outfielder Austin Slater to a minor league contract with an invitation lo spring training. He was released on March 21, 2026.
- On February 21, 2026, the Tigers signed pitcher Colin Poche to a minor league contract with an invitation lo spring training.
- On March 10, 2026, the Tigers selected the contract of Enmanuel De Jesus and added him to the 40-man roster. He had signed a minor league contract in December.
- On March 24, 2026, the Tigers signed pitcher Connor Seabold to a split contract that would earn $800K at the major league level.
- On March 25, 2026, the Tigers selected the contract of infielder Kevin McGonigle, a first round draft pick in the 2023 MLB draft.
- On April 11, 2026, the Tigers claimed pitcher Grant Holman off waivers from the Los Angeles Dodgers and signed outfielder Tyler Gentry to a minor league contract. Holman was designated for assignment on May 3. Gentry was released from his minor league contract on August 10.
- On May 2, 2026, the Tigers selected the contract of pitcher Ricky Vanasco, who was signed to a minor league contract in July, 2025.
- On May 5, 2026, the Tigers signed infielder Paul DeJong to a minor league contract.
- On May 8, 2026, the Tigers signed pitcher Carl Edwards Jr. to a minor league contract and resigned infielder Zack Short to a major league contract.
- On May 10, 2026, the Tigers signed pitcher Nick Sandlin to a minor league contract. After being released on August 25, Sandlin was resigned to a minor league contract on August 28.
- On May 10,2026, the Tigers selected the contract of infielder Gage Workman, who was returned to the Tigers in 2025 after being selected in the Rule 5 draft. He was traded to the Padres at the deadline.
- On June 11, 2026, the Tigers claimed outfielder James Outman off waivers from the Minnesota Twins.
- On June 23, 2026, the Tigers selected the contract of outfielder Ben Malgeri, an 18th round pick in the 2021 MLB draft..
- On June 26, 2026, the Tigers claimed pitcher Yilber Díaz off waivers from the Arizona Diamondbacks..
- On July 11, 2026, the Tigers claimed pitcher Andre Granillo off waivers from the Washington Nationals. He was designated for assignment on July 31.
- On July 19, 2026, the Tigers selected the contract of minor league pitcher Troy Watson and optioned him to Triple-A Toledo.. He was acquired in a minor league trade with the Toronto Blue Jays in August, 2024, for cash. He was designated for assignment on August 12 and claimed by the Mariners three days later without appearing in a major league game.
- On July 23, 2026, the Tigers sign veteran catcher Carlos Pérez to a minor league contract.
- On July 31, 2026, the Tigers selected the contract of outfielder Max Clark, a first round draft pick in the 2023 MLB draft.
- On August 5, 2026, the Tigers signed pitcher Austin Gomber to a minor league contract and assigned him to Triple-A Toledo.
- On August 6, 2026, the Tigers signed catcher Seby Zavala to a minor league contract and assigned him to Triple-A Toledo.
- On August 14, 2026, the Tigers signed outfielder Michael Siani to a minor league contract.
- On August 16, 2026, the Tigers selected the contract of outfielder Brett Callahan, a thirteenth round draft pick in the 2023 MLB draft.
- On August 23, 2026, the Tigers selected the contract of pitcher Andrew Sears, a tenth round draft pick in the 2023 MLB draft.
- On August 24, 2026, the Tigers signed pitcher Tyler Kinley to a major league contract for the remainder of the season.
- On August 31, 2026, the Tigers selected the contract of infielder John Peck, a seventh round draft pick in the 2023 MLB draft.

== Season accomplishments ==
=== Team accomplishments ===
- On July 28 against the Baltimore Orioles, the Tigers scored in every inning of a 14–0 rout, the first time a major league team scored in every inning of a shutout since the 1935 Pittsburgh Pirates.
- On August 9, the Tigers defeated the San Francisco Giants to earn a team record seventh consecutive road series win.
- For the first time since 1987, three Tiger players won the AL Silver Slugger Award. Outfielder Riley Greene and catcher Dillon Dingler won at their respective positions. Kevin McGonigle, who split time between third base and shortstop, won in the Utility category. Dingler's honor gave the Tigers 11 Silver Slugger wins by a catcher since the award started in 1980, more than any other franchise at the position.

=== Individual accomplishments ===
- On March 26, Kevin McGonigle had four hits, becoming the first Tiger since Billy Bean in 1987 to have four hits in his MLB debut. He is the sixth major leaguer since 1900 to have at least four hits in an Opening Day debut.
- On July 9, Eduardo Valencia became the tenth Tiger to hit a home run in his first MLB at-bat, but only the second to do so in a pinch hitting role, following Gates Brown in 1963.
- With a first inning strikeout of Taylor Ward against the Baltimore Orioles on July 29, Tarik Skubal reached 1,000 career strikeouts. By innings pitched (857), he reached the milestone faster than any Tiger in history, considerably faster than Max Scherzer's mark of 1,000 strikeouts in 944 2/3 innings.

== Season standings ==
=== American League Central ===
AL Central
Team	W	L	Pct.	GB	Home	Road
Cleveland Guardians	85	77	.525	—	41‍–‍40	44‍–‍37
Chicago White Sox	84	78	.519	1	48‍–‍33	36‍–‍45
Minnesota Twins	77	85	.475	8	42‍–‍39	35‍–‍46
Detroit Tigers	76	86	.469	9	42‍–‍39	34‍–‍47
Kansas City Royals	69	93	.426	16	41‍–‍40	28‍–‍53

=== American League Wildcard ===
Division leaders
Team	W	L	Pct.
Tampa Bay Rays	98	64	.605
Cleveland Guardians	85	77	.525
Houston Astros	81	81	.500

Wild Card teams (Top 3 teams qualify for postseason)
Team	W	L	Pct.	GB
New York Yankees	93	68	.578	+9½
Boston Red Sox	87	75	.537	+3
Chicago White Sox	84	78	.519	—
Texas Rangers	80	82	.494	4
Baltimore Orioles	79	82	.491	4½
Toronto Blue Jays	79	83	.488	5
Minnesota Twins	77	85	.475	7
Detroit Tigers	76	86	.469	8
Seattle Mariners	76	86	.469	8
Kansas City Royals	69	93	.426	15
Athletics	64	98	.395	20
Los Angeles Angels	62	100	.383	22

=== Record against opponents ===
2026 American League record Source: MLB Standings Grid – 2026
Team	ATH	BAL	BOS	CWS	CLE	DET	HOU	KC	LAA	MIN	NYY	SEA	TB	TEX	TOR	NL
Athletics	—	2–4	3–4	1–5	1–5	0–6	6–7	2–5	8–5	3–3	3–3	7–6	0–6	7–6	2–4	19–29
Baltimore	4–2	—	4–9	4–2	3–4	4–2	5–1	5–1	3–3	3–3	3–9	3–4	8–5	2–4	7–6	21–27
Boston	4–3	9–4	—	6–0	3–3	5–2	1–5	5–1	4–2	1–5	6–7	3–3	6–7	3–3	4–9	27–21
Chicago	5–1	2–4	0–6	—	7–6	9–4	2–5	9–4	4–2	8–5	3–4	3–3	2–4	4–2	5–1	21–27
Cleveland	5–1	4–3	3–3	6–7	—	10–3	2–4	7–6	6–0	6–7	2–4	4–3	1–5	2–4	2–4	25–23
Detroit	6–0	2–4	2–5	4–9	3–10	—	2–5	6–7	3–3	5–8	4–2	4–2	4–2	4–2	3–3	24–24
Houston	7–6	1–5	5–1	5–2	4–2	5–2	—	4–2	7–6	2–4	3–3	3–10	2–4	9–4	3–3	21–27
Kansas City	5–2	1–5	1–5	4–9	6–7	7–6	2–4	—	5–1	8–5	0–6	5–1	2–5	1–5	3–3	19–29
Los Angeles	5–8	3–3	2–4	2–4	0–6	3–3	6–7	1–5	—	3–4	3–4	6–7	3–3	8–5	2–4	15–33
Minnesota	3–3	3–3	5–1	5–8	7–6	8–5	4–2	5–8	4–3	—	3–3	2–4	1–5	5–1	4–3	18–30
New York	3–3	9–3	7–6	4–3	4–2	2–4	3–3	6–0	4–3	3–3	—	4–2	6–7	4–2	7–6	27–21
Seattle	6–7	4–3	3–3	3–3	3–4	2–4	10–3	1–5	7–6	4–2	2–4	—	1–5	5–8	2–4	23–25
Tampa Bay	6–0	5–8	7–6	4–2	5–1	2–4	4–2	5–2	3–3	5–1	7–6	5–1	—	4–3	9–4	27–21
Texas	6–7	4–2	3–3	2–4	4–2	2–4	4–9	5–1	5–8	1–5	2–4	8–5	3–4	—	6–1	25–23
Toronto	4–2	6–7	9–4	1–5	4–2	3–3	3–3	3–3	4–2	3–4	6–7	4–2	4–9	1–6	—	24–24

Updated with the results of all games through September 27, 2026.

== Game log ==
=== Regular season ===
2026 Game Log: 76–86 (Home 42–39, Road 34–47)
March/April: 16–16 (Home 10–2, Road 6–14)

#	Date	Opponent	Score	Win	Loss	Save	Attendance	Record	Streak
1	March 26	@ Padres	8–2	**Skubal** (1–0)	Pivetta (0–1)	—	45,673	1–0	W1
2	March 27	@ Padres	5–2	**De Jesus** (1–0)	Estrada (0–1)	**Jansen** (1)	44,896	2–0	W2
3	March 28	@ Padres	0–3	Vásquez (1–0)	**Flaherty** (0–1)	Miller (1)	44,368	2–1	L1
4	March 30	@ Diamondbacks	6–9	Soroka (1–0)	**Verlander** (0–1)	Sewald (1)	48,350	2–2	L2
5	March 31	@ Diamondbacks	5–7	Hoffmann (1–0)	**Vest** (0–1)	Sewald (2)	28,780	2–3	L3
6	April 1	@ Diamondbacks	0–1	Gallen (1–1)	**Skubal** (1–1)	Loáisiga (1)	23,166	2–4	L4
7	April 3	Cardinals	4–0	**Valdez** (1–0)	McGreevy (0–1)	—	45,008	3–4	W1
8	April 4	Cardinals	11–6 (8)	**Hurter** (1–0)	May (0–2)	—	28,708	4–4	W2
9	April 5	Cardinals	3–5	Leahy (1–1)	**Montero** (0–1)	O'Brien (2)	28,823	4–5	L1
10	April 6	@ Twins	3–7	Ryan (1–1)	**Mize** (0–1)	Laweryson (1)	12,569	4–6	L2
11	April 7	@ Twins	2–4	Bradley (2–0)	**Skubal** (1–2)	Topa (1)	12,341	4–7	L3
12	April 8	@ Twins	6–8	Ober (1–0)	**Valdez** (1–1)	Funderburk (1)	13,038	4–8	L4
13	April 9	@ Twins	1–3	Acton (1–0)	**Vest** (0–2)	Orze (1)	19,054	4–9	L5
14	April 10	Marlins	2–0	**Montero** (1–1)	Paddack (0–2)	**Jansen** (2)	20,285	5–9	W1
15	April 11	Marlins	6–1	**Mize** (1–1)	Junk (0–2)	**Anderson** (1)	31,414	6–9	W2
16	April 12	Marlins	8–2	**Skubal** (2–2)	Alcántara (2–1)	—	26,768	7–9	W3
17	April 14	Royals	2–1	**Vest** (1–2)	Mears (1–1)	**Jansen** (3)	16,655	8–9	W4
18	April 15	Royals	2–1	**Finnegan** (1–0)	Morgan (0–1)	**Jansen** (4)	19,609	9–9	W5
19	April 16	Royals	10–9	**Seabold** (1–0)	Erceg (0–1)	—	15,034	10–9	W6
20	April 17	@ Red Sox	0–1 (10)	Whitlock (1–1)	**Vest** (1–3)	—	34,866	10–10	L1
21	April 18	@ Red Sox	4–1	**Skubal** (3–2)	Bello (1–2)	**Jansen** (5)	36,527	11–10	W1
22	April 19	@ Red Sox	6–2	**Valdez** (2–1)	Crochet (2–3)	—	34,650	12–10	W2
23	April 20	@ Red Sox	6–8	Whitlock (2–1)	**Holton** (0–1)	Chapman (4)	34,880	12–11	L1
24	April 21	Brewers	4–12	Anderson (1–1)	**Montero** (1–2)	—	20,847	12–12	L2
25	April 22	Brewers	5–2	**Mize** (2–1)	Patrick (1–1)	**Jansen** (6)	20,378	13–12	W1
26	April 23	Brewers	5–4	**Hurter** (2–0)	Uribe (1–1)	—	25,224	14–12	W2
27	April 24	@ Reds	8–9	Ashcraft (1–0)	**Jansen** (0–1)	—	23,879	14–13	L1
28	April 25	@ Reds	2–9	Singer (2–1)	**Flaherty** (0–2)	—	35,315	14–14	L2
29	April 26	@ Reds	8–3	**Hurter** (3–0)	Moll (1–1)	—	31,377	15–14	W1
30	April 28	@ Braves	2–5	Perez (2–1)	**Mize** (2–2)	—	32,162	15–15	L1
31	April 29	@ Braves	3–4	Lopez (2–1)	**Jansen** (0–2)	—	30,439	15–16	L2
32	April 30	@ Braves	5–2	**Anderson** (1–0)	Payamps (0–2)	**Finnegan** (1)	32,620	16–16	W1

May: 6–22 (Home 4–12, Road 2–10)

#	Date	Opponent	Score	Win	Loss	Save	Attendance	Record	Streak
33	May 1	Rangers	4–5	Alexander (1–0)	**Smith** (0–1)	Latz (3)	28,622	16–17	L1
34	May 2	Rangers	5–1	**Montero** (2–2)	Rocker (1–3)	—	33,373	17–17	W1
35	May 3	Rangers	7–1	**Hurter** (4–0)	Leiter (1–3)	—	24,083	18–17	W2
36	May 4	Red Sox	4–5	Tolle (1–1)	**Vanasco** (0–1)	Chapman (7)	22,321	18–18	L1
37	May 5	Red Sox	3–10	Bello (2–4)	**Valdez** (2–2)	—	20,674	18–19	L2
38	May 6	Red Sox	0–4	Gray (3–1)	**Flaherty** (0–3)	—	17,334	18–20	L3
39	May 8	@ Royals	3–4	Erceg (3–1)	**Hurter** (4–1)	—	29,374	18–21	L4
40	May 9	@ Royals	1–5	Wacha (4–2)	**Smith** (0–2)	—	26,724	18–22	L5
41	May 10	@ Royals	6–3	**De Jesus** (2–0)	Mears (2–2)	**Jensen** (7)	17,295	19–22	W1
42	May 12	@ Mets	2–10	Peralta (3–3)	**Flaherty** (0–4)	—	36,382	19–23	L1
43	May 13	@ Mets	2–3 (10)	Raley (1–1)	**Anderson** (1–1)	—	33,989	19–24	L2
44	May 14	@ Mets	4–9	McLean (2–2)	**Montero** (2–3)	—	34,642	19–25	L3
45	May 15	Blue Jays	3–2	**Jansen** (1–2)	Hoffman (2–3)	—	31,038	20–25	W1
46	May 16	Blue Jays	1–2 (10)	Varland (2–1)	**Holton** (0–2)	—	38,295	20–26	L1
47	May 17	Blue Jays	1–4	Gausman (3–3)	**Flaherty** (0–5)	Rogers (1)	37,486	20–27	L2
48	May 18	Guardians	2–8	Cecconi (3–4)	**Valdez** (2–3)	—	18,913	20–28	L3
49	May 19	Guardians	3–4	Holderman (1–0)	**Holton** (0–3)	Smith (15)	21,239	20–29	L4
50	May 20	Guardians	2–3 (10)	Holderman (2–0)	**Holton** (0–4)	Smith (16)	20,450	20–30	L5
51	May 21	Guardians	1–3	Cantillo (4–1)	**Mize** (2–3)	Gaddis (1)	25,687	20–31	L6
52	May 22	@ Orioles	4–7	Bassitt (4–3)	**Flaherty** (0–6)	Nunez (3)	14,956	20–32	L7
―	May 23	@ Orioles	Postponed (inclement weather). Rescheduled to May 24.						
53	May 24 (1)	@ Orioles	3–5	Enns (2–0)	**Jansen** (1–3)	—	17,616	20–33	L8
54	May 24 (2)	@ Orioles	4–1	**Melton** (1–0)	Rogers (2–6)	**Anderson** (2)	19,735	21—33	W1
55	May 26	Angels	6–10	Fermín (2–1)	**Vest** (1–4)	—	21,954	21–34	L1
56	May 27	Angels	4–0	**Anderson** (2–1)	Soriano (6–4)	—	27,692	22–34	W1
57	May 28	Angels	1–7	Rodriguez (2–1)	**Flaherty** (0–7)	—	29,670	22–35	L1
58	May 29	@ White Sox	3–4 (10)	Hudson (3–1)	**Anderson** (2–2)	—	30,019	22–36	L2
59	May 30	@ White Sox	1–7	Kay (5–1)	**Valdez** (2–4)	—	29,435	22–37	L3
60	May 31	@ White Sox	1–2	Eisert (1–0)	**Anderson** (2–3)	Davis (1)	28,764	22–38	L4

June: 15–11 (Home 9–7, Road 6–4)

#	Date	Opponent	Score	Win	Loss	Save	Attendance	Record	Streak
61	June 1	@ Rays	10–9	**Holton** (1–4)	Jax (1–4)	**Vest** (1)	13,695	23–38	W1
62	June 2	@ Rays	8–0	**Flaherty** (1–7)	Matz (4–3)	**De Jesus** (1)	14,010	24–38	W2
63	June 3	@ Rays	7–2	**Melton** (2–0)	Martinez (5–2)	—	12,585	25–38	W3
64	June 5	Mariners	7–3	**Valdez** (3–4)	Woo (5–4)	—	32,591	26–38	W4
65	June 6	Mariners	0–4	Miller (2–0)	**Montero** (2–4)	—	32,606	26–39	L1
66	June 7	Mariners	5–4	**Vest** (2–4)	Munoz (3–4)	—	34,893	27–39	W1
67	June 9	Twins	10–4	**Melton** (3–0)	Bradley (5–3)	—	22,641	28–39	W2
68	June 10	Twins	4–6	Rogers (2–3)	**Valdez** (3–5)	Gómez (5)	23,517	28–40	L1
69	June 11	Twins	11–0	**Montero** (3–4)	Matthews (2–4)	—	30,714	29–40	W1
70	June 12	@ Guardians	2–3	Bibee (2–7)	**Flaherty** (1–8)	Smith (22)	35,427	29–41	L1
71	June 13	@ Guardians	1–3	Cantillo (5–3)	**Skubal** (3–3)	Smith (23)	32,683	29–42	L2
―	June 14	@ Guardians	Postponed (inclement weather). Rescheduled to September 4.						
72	June 15	@ Astros	9–3	**Finnegan** (2–0)	Teng (3–6)	—	26,632	30–42	W1
73	June 16	@ Astros	2–4	King (2–1)	**Montero** (3–5)	Hader (3)	31,244	30–43	L1
74	June 17	@ Astros	2–4	Lambert (6–4)	**Mize** (2–4)	Hader (4)	31,476	30–44	L2
75	June 19	White Sox	4–3	**Anderson** (3–3)	Fedde (2–6)	**Jensen** (8)	41,353	31–44	W1
76	June 20	White Sox	4–1	**Melton** (4–0)	Rock (0–1)	**Jansen** (9)	34,692	32–44	W2
77	June 21	White Sox	5–4 (10)	**Vest** (3–4)	Eisert (1–1)	—	40,021	33–44	W3
78	June 22	Yankees	5–3	**Valdez** (4–5)	Cole (2–2)	**Vest** (2)	24,284	34–44	W4
79	June 23	Yankees	3–4	Rodón (4–2)	**Mize** (2–5)	Bednar (15)	27,157	34–45	L1
80	June 24	Yankees	2–4	Weathers (3–5)	**Skubal** (3–4)	Bednar (16)	23,567	34–46	L2
81	June 25	Astros	1–2	Imai (5–3)	**Melton** (4–1)	De Los Santos (5)	25,066	34–47	L3
82	June 26	Astros	8–0	**Montero** (4–5)	Arrighetti (7–4)	—	30,036	35–47	W1
83	June 27	Astros	6–8	Blubaugh (4–2)	**Vest** (3–5)	Hader (7)	27,232	35–48	L1
84	June 28	Astros	5–7 (10)	Hader (2–0)	**Jansen** (1–4)	—	33,655	35–49	L2
85	June 29	@ Yankees	7–3	**Mize** (3–5)	Weathers (3–6)	—	40,506	36–49	W1
86	June 30	@ Yankees	9–3	**Skubal** (4–4)	Schlittler (8–5)	—	37,211	37–49	W2

July: 15–9 (Home 7–6, Road 8–3)

#	Date	Opponent	Score	Win	Loss	Save	Attendance	Record	Streak
87	July 1	@ Yankees	6–2 (11)	**Montero** (5–5)	Doval (3–1)	—	37,117	38–49	W3
88	July 2	@ Rangers	4–10	Eovaldi (9–7)	**Valdez** (4–6)	—	33,450	38–50	L1
89	July 4	@ Rangers	3–0	**Flaherty** (2–8)	Quantrill (3–1)	**Montero** (1)	37,576	39–50	W1
90	July 5	@ Rangers	6–3	**Mize** (4–5)	Rocker (2–7)	**Jansen** (10)	27,887	40–50	W2
91	July 7	Athletics	6–2	**Skubal** (5–4)	Ginn (7–5)	—	28,736	41–50	W3
92	July 8	Athletics	6–1	**Melton** (5–1)	Springs (3–9)	—	29,049	42–50	W4
93	July 9	Athletics	4–1	**Valdez** (5–6)	Perkins (2–5)	**Jansen** (11)	20,699	43–50	W5
94	July 10	Phillies	10–2	**Flaherty** (3–8)	Mayza (2–3)	—	34,084	44–50	W6
95	July 11	Phillies	2–4	Sanchez (11–4)	**Mize** (4–6)	Duran (24)	33,705	44–51	L1
96	July 12	Phillies	0–5	Wheeler (10–1)	**Skubal** (5–5)	—	35,065	44–52	L2
**96th All-Star Game in Philadelphia, PA**
97	July 17	@ Angels	2–1	**Montero** (6–5)	Yates (0–5)	—	29,536	45–52	W1
98	July 18	@ Angels	7–0	**Skubal** (6–5)	Rodriguez (3–3)	—	32,003	46–52	W2
99	July 19	@ Angels	2–3	Johnson (2–4)	**Anderson** (3–4)	Zeferjahn (3)	30,778	46–53	L1
100	July 20	@ Cubs	8–6 (10)	**Jansen** (2–4)	Thornton (3–3)	**Holton** (1)	39,023	47–53	W1
101	July 21	@ Cubs	2–11	Peterson (5–7)	**Valdez** (5–7)	—	39,039	47–54	L1
102	July 22	@ Cubs	5–1	**Montero** (7–5)	Rea (7–7)	—	40,512	48–54	W1
103	July 23	Royals	4–3	**Anderson** (4–4)	Cruz (2–3)	**Finnegan** (2)	35,548	49–54	W2
104	July 24	Royals	2–1	**Skubal** (7–5)	Way (1–1)	**Jansen** (12)	40,638	50–54	W3
105	July 25	Royals	2–3	Lynch IV (4–2)	**Waguespack** (0–1)	Lange (10)	32,867	50–55	L1
106	July 26	Royals	4–5	Pearson (2–0)	**Sommers** (0–1)	Cruz (2)	29,489	50–56	L2
107	July 27	Orioles	5–8	Wolfram (3–2)	**Montero** (7–6)	Garcia (5)	21,913	50–57	L3
108	July 28	Orioles	14–0	**Melton** (6–1)	Kremer (1–4)	—	27,453	51–57	W1
109	July 29	Orioles	9–10 (12)	Wolfram (4–2)	**Sommers** (0–2)	Kittredge (4)	34,406	51–58	L1
110	July 31	@ Athletics	13–1	**Madden** (1–0)	Springs (3–11)	—	8,926	52–58	W1

August: 11–16 (Home 4–8, Road 7–8)

#	Date	Opponent	Score	Win	Loss	Save	Attendance	Record	Streak
111	August 1	@ Athletics	8–6	**Valdez** (6–7)	Perkins (2–7)	**Jansen** (13)	10,426	53–58	W2
112	August 2	@ Athletics	11–0	**Montero** (8–6)	Jump (4–7)	—	8,237	54–58	W3
113	August 4	@ Mariners	8–0	**Melton** (7–1)	Hancock (6–6)	—	35,752	55–58	W4
114	August 5	@ Mariners	2–4	Woo (8–8)	**Hanifee** (0–1)	Munoz (20)	40,743	55–59	L1
115	August 6	@ Mariners	11–0	**Valdez** (7–7)	Miller (4–6)	—	26,750	56–59	W1
116	August 7	@ Giants	2–5	Houser (3–7)	**Montero** (8–7)	Smith (2)	34,104	56–60	L1
117	August 8	@ Giants	8–0	**Jobe** (1–0)	Roupp (7–11)	—	35,506	57–60	W1
118	August 9	@ Giants	3–1 (10)	**Jansen** (3–4)	Hentges (1–4)	**Holton** (2)	32,200	58–60	W2
119	August 11	Guardians	6–4	**Waguespack** (1–1)	Bibee (4–12)	**Jansen** (14)	30,709	59–60	W3
120	August 12	Guardians	4–6	Griffin (13–4)	**Valdez** (7–8)	Smith (31)	31,400.	59–61	L1
121	August 13	Guardians	3–0	**Montero** (9–7)	Messick (9–7)	**Jansen** (15)	31,777	60–61	W1
122	August 14	White Sox	5–9	Urquidy (1–1)	**Jobe** (1–1)	—	39,638	60–62	L1
123	August 15	White Sox	3–4	Hicks (2–1)	**Sommers** (0–3)	Hudson (5)	33,119	60–63	L2
124	August 16	White Sox	5–7	Smith (2–0)	**Holton** (1–5)	Newcomb (4)	34,251	60–64	L3
125	August 17	@ Pirates	8–5	**Valdez** (8–8)	Mlodzinski (6–6)	**Jansen** (16)	21,956	61–64	W1
126	August 18	@ Pirates	1–4	Ashcraft (13–5)	**Montero** (9–8)	Montgomery (5)	20,222	61–65	L1
127	August 19	@ Pirates	3–4	Montgomery (5–3)	**Jansen** (3–5)	—	18,208	61–66	L2
128	August 21	@ Royals	2–5	Cameron (8–8)	**Melton** (7–2)	Pearson (3)	29,535	61–67	L3
129	August 22	@ Royals	1–3	Wacha (7–8)	**Anderson** (4–5)	Kimbrel (1)	23,156	61–68	L4
130	August 23	@ Royals	7–11	Schreiber (1–3)	**Sears** (0–1)	—	21,269	61–69	L5
131	August 24	Rays	1–4	Rasmussen (14–5)	**Valdez** (8–9)	Baker (38)	23,265	61–70	L6
132	August 25	Rays	4–1	**Sommers** (1–3)	Seymour (9–5)	**Jansen** (17)	26,605	62–70	W1
133	August 26	Rays	0–3	Peralta (6–11)	**Melton** (7–3)	Wells (5)	21,482	62–71	L1
134	August 28	Dodgers	1–2	Phillips (2–2)	**Waguespack** (1–2)	Scott (20)	41,012	62–72	L2
135	August 29	Dodgers	2–1	**Jansen** (4–5)	Dreyer (4–2)	—	40,022	63–72	W1
136	August 30	Dodgers	1–6	Glasnow (4–0)	**Valdez** (8–10)	—	35,387	63–73	L1
137	August 31	@ Twins	1–11	Bradley (10–6)	**Jobe** (1–2)	—	14,918	63–74	L2

September: 13–12 (Home 8–4, Road 5–8)

#	Date	Opponent	Score	Win	Loss	Save	Attendance	Record	Streak
138	September 1	@ Twins	2–15	Prielipp (4–7)	**Melton** (7–4)	—	17,267	63–75	L3
139	September 2	@ Twins	11–6 (12)	**Finnegan** (3–0)	Nance (2–3)	—	13,770	64–75	W1
140	September 4 (1)	@ Guardians	6–7	Smith (4–1)	**Sommers** (1–4)	—	23,562	64–76	L1
141	September 4 (2)	@ Guardians	3–4 (10)	Gaddis (3–3)	**Jansen** (4–6)	—	21,474	64–77	L2
142	September 5	@ Guardians	6–0	**Valdez** (9–10)	Messick (11–9)	—	30,862	65–77	W1
143	September 6	@ Guardians	2–3 (10)	Smith (5–1)	**Finnegan** (3–1)	—	32,318	65–78	L1
144	September 7	Twins	5–4	**Melton** (8–4)	Ryan (6–9)	**Jansen** (18)	23,314	66–78	W1
145	September 8	Twins	2–3	Kremer (3–5)	**Anderson** (4–6)	Gómez (22)	22,874	66–79	L1
146	September 9	Twins	7–2	**Holton** (2–5)	Matthews (9–10)	—	18,788	67–79	W1
147	September 11	Rockies	6–2	**Valdez** (10–10)	Manfredi (1–2)	**Jansen** (19)	33,245	68–79	W2
148	September 12	Rockies	11–7	**Brieske** (1–0)	Hill (1–4)	—	32,019	69–79	W3
149	September 13	Rockies	8–1	**Jobe** (2–2)	Hughes (0–8)	—	22,726	70–79	W4
150	September 14	@ Blue Jays	6–5	**Kinley** (7–5)	Varland (5–6)	**Jansen** (20)	42,867	71–79	W5
151	September 15	@ Blue Jays	10–1	**Anderson** (5–6)	Lorenzen (3–13)	—	43,554	72–79	W6
152	September 16	@ Blue Jays	1–5	Scherzer (3–8)	**Montero** (9–9)	Varland (34)	43,463	72–80	L1
153	September 17	@ White Sox	1–3	Hudson (5–4)	**Valdez** (10–11)	Taylor (9)	18,472	72–81	L2
154	September 18	@ White Sox	11–8	**Sommers** (2–4)	Newcomb (2–5)	**Jansen** (21)	26,204	73–81	W1
155	September 19	@ White Sox	1–3	Burke (10–7)	**Jobe** (2–3)	Taylor (10)	30,631	73–82	L1
156	September 20	@ White Sox	1–8	Brazobán (6–2)	**Melton** (8–5)	—	21,354	73–83	L2
157	September 21	Nationals	9–2	**Montero** (10–9)	Herz (0–1)	—	21,121	74–83	W1
158	September 22	Nationals	1–3	Kent (2–4)	**Anderson** (5–7)	Tolman (4)	25,608	74–84	L1
159	September 23	Nationals	2–4	Dion (2–2)	**Valdez** (10–12)	Cruz (1)	21,373	74–85	L2
160	September 25	Pirates	8–7	**Jobe** (3–3)	Chandler (8–10)	**Jansen** (22)	36,315	75–85	W1
161	September 26	Pirates	4–3	**Waguespack** (2–2)	Montgomery (6–4)	—	41,377	76–85	W2
162	September 27	Pirates	2–4	Bachar (2–4)	**Ryan** (0–1)	Montgomery (18)	30,165	76–86	L1

Legend: = Win = Loss = Eliminated from playoff race = Postponement
Bold = Tigers team member

== Roster ==
2026 Detroit Tigers
Roster
Pitchers: 38 Drew Anderson; 4 Beau Brieske; 37 Enmanuel De Jesus; 62 Yilber Díaz; 67 Kyle Finnegan; 9 Jack Flaherty; 75 Brenan Hanifee; 87 Tyler Holton; 48 Brant Hurter; 74 Kenley Jansen; 21 Jackson Jobe; 55 Tyler Kinley; 36 Ty Madden; 52 Troy Melton; 12 Casey Mize; 54 Keider Montero; 56 Tanner Rainey; 77 River Ryan; 43 Connor Seabold; 64 Andrew Sears; 29 Tarik Skubal; 65 Burch Smith; 51 Drew Sommers; 59 Framber Valdez; 70 Ricky Vanasco; 35 Justin Verlander; 19 Will Vest; 58 Jacob Waguespack	Catchers: 13 Dillon Dingler; 34 Jake Rogers; 32 Eduardo Valencia; Infielders: 28 Javier Báez; 17 Jace Jung; 33 Colt Keith; 50 Hao-Yu Lee; 7 Kevin McGonigle; 18 John Peck; 15 Zack Short; 20 Spencer Torkelson; 25 Gleyber Torres; 99 Gage Workman	Outfielders: 34 Brett Callahan; 30 Kerry Carpenter; 15 Max Clark; 40 Trei Cruz; 31 Riley Greene; 18 Jahmai Jones; 44 Corey Julks; 53 Ben Malgeri; 39 Zach McKinstry; 22 Parker Meadows; 43 James Outman; 46 Wenceel Pérez; 8 Matt Vierling	Manager: 14 A. J. Hinch; Coaches: 92 Cody Asche (assistant hitting); 88 Billy Boyer (third base); 90 Michael Brdar (hitting); 98 Chris Chinea (bullpen catcher); 41 Chris Fetter (pitching); 26 George Lombard (bench); 63 Robin Lund (assistant pitching); 61 Juan Nieves (assistant pitching); 97 Tim Remes (bullpen catcher); 99 Anthony Sanders (first base); 83 Ryan Sienko (catching); 91 Lance Zawadzki (assistant hitting)

== Player stats ==
= Indicates team leader

=== Batting ===
Note: G = Games played; AB = At bats; R = Runs scored; H = Hits; 2B = Doubles; 3B = Triples; HR = Home runs; RBI = Runs batted in; SB = Stolen bases; BB = Walks; AVG = Batting average; SLG = Slugging average

Player	G	AB	R	H	2B	3B	HR	RBI	SB	BB	AVG	SLG
Kevin McGonigle	156	605	97	168	28	5	18	72	12	95	.278	.430
Dillon Dingler	145	551	72	134	27	2	27	91	0	34	.243	.446
Spencer Torkelson	159	526	66	121	28	1	26	77	1	71	.230	.435
Riley Greene	140	511	79	143	32	2	21	75	3	71	.280	.474
Colt Keith	140	384	51	99	19	4	10	36	6	32	.258	.406
Zach McKinstry	129	371	42	74	15	4	4	26	3	42	.199	.294
Gleyber Torres	96	358	57	93	13	0	8	38	0	57	.260	.363
Hao-Yu Lee	114	330	40	87	19	2	10	46	3	30	.264	.424
Matt Vierling	92	266	24	55	13	3	5	31	4	19	.207	.335
Kerry Carpenter	81	231	27	48	5	2	13	36	0	18	.208	.416
Javier Báez	58	187	25	45	12	1	3	20	1	6	.241	.364
Max Clark	51	180	27	49	11	3	3	23	5	18	.272	.417
Wenceel Pérez	53	161	22	49	4	1	7	17	3	14	.180	.348
Eduardo Valencia	42	129	25	44	14	0	8	21	0	6	.341	.636
Ben Malgeri	60	120	18	30	5	0	5	20	5	17	.250	.417
Jahmai Jones	57	95	7	13	2	0	2	7	0	10	.137	.221
James Outman	45	93	14	17	0	1	5	14	2	5	.183	.366
Jake Rogers	34	93	11	15	2	1	3	9	1	13	.161	.301
Brett Callahan	33	71	4	15	3	1	1	8	1	7	.211	.324
John Peck	24	68	3	11	1	0	0	7	5	9	.162	.176
Gage Workman	16	38	3	6	3	0	2	5	0	0	.158	.395
Parker Meadows	12	36	3	9	1	1	0	2	3	2	.250	.333
Zack Short	23	36	3	6	2	0	0	2	0	7	.167	.222
Jace Jung	6	9	2	2	0	0	0	0	0	2	.222	.222
Corey Julks	4	7	1	2	1	0	0	0	0	0	.286	.429
Trei Cruz	2	5	0	0	0	0	0	0	0	0	.000	.000
Totals	162	5461	723	1315	260	34	181	683	58	585	.241	.400

=== Pitching ===
Note: W = Wins; L = Losses; ERA = Earned run average; G = Games pitched; GS = Games started; SV = Saves; IP = Innings pitched; H = Hits allowed; R = Runs allowed; ER = Earned runs allowed; BB = Walks allowed; SO = Strikeouts

Player	W	L	ERA	G	GS	SV	IP	H	R	ER	BB	SO
Framber Valdez	10	12	4.03	31	31	0	174.0	170	87	78	67	135
Keider Montero	10	9	3.48	32	25	1	155.0	124	64	60	37	107
Troy Melton	8	5	2.76	20	20	0	114.1	92	41	35	37	94
Drew Anderson	5	7	3.67	49	11	2	108.0	94	48	44	43	114
Tarik Skubal	7	5	2.79	16	16	0	96.2	74	33	30	14	116
Jack Flaherty	3	8	4.48	20	19	0	88.1	81	52	44	42	103
Casey Mize	4	6	2.70	16	16	0	86.2	67	27	26	19	85
Tyler Holton	2	5	2.75	67	3	2	72.0	71	27	22	19	55
Kyle Finnegan	3	1	4.30	63	0	2	60.2	67	31	29	34	47
Ty Madden	1	0	3.26	20	1	0	47.0	33	17	17	14	46
Jacob Waguespack	2	2	2.49	35	1	0	47.0	25	14	13	18	35
Jackson Jobe	3	3	3.91	9	9	0	46.0	38	21	20	16	51
Kenley Jansen	4	6	3.20	50	0	22	45.0	24	18	16	23	51
Enmanuel De Jesus	2	0	3.83	30	0	1	42.1	38	21	18	15	39
Drew Sommers	2	4	3.63	43	0	0	39.2	35	20	16	14	62
Brant Hurter	4	1	3.06	29	0	0	35.1	24	13	12	15	24
Will Vest	3	5	6.08	27	0	2	26.2	28	22	18	10	27
Beau Brieske	1	0	4.97	18	0	0	25.1	23	14	14	7	24
Brenan Hanifee	0	1	5.06	23	2	0	21.1	24	12	12	7	10
Andrew Sears	0	1	7.11	6	3	0	19.0	24	21	15	8	15
Burch Smith	0	2	3.18	13	1	0	17.0	18	8	6	7	20
Connor Seabold	1	0	3.45	11	0	0	15.2	17	6	6	5	14
Tyler Kinley	1	0	1.84	15	0	0	14.2	5	3	3	6	6
Justin Verlander	0	1	7.00	2	2	0	9.0	11	7	7	3	7
Tanner Rainey	0	0	3.86	6	0	0	7.0	3	3	3	8	6
Ricky Vanasco	0	1	15.63	5	0	0	6.1	14	12	11	6	4
Yilber Díaz	0	0	6.75	4	0	0	5.1	5	4	4	4	6
River Ryan	0	1	4.15	2	2	0	4.1	5	2	2	3	6
Jake Rogers	0	0	0.00	3	0	0	2.1	3	0	0	1	3
Zach McKinstry	0	0	18.00	2	0	0	2.0	3	4	4	5	0
Totals	76	86	3.67	162	162	32	1434.0	1240	652	584	507	1312

== Farm system ==
Level	Team	League	Manager
AAA	Toledo Mud Hens	International League	Gabe Alvarez
AA	Erie SeaWolves	Eastern League	Tony Cappuccilli
High-A	West Michigan Whitecaps	Midwest League	Rene Rivera
Single-A	Lakeland Flying Tigers	Florida State League	Salvador Paniagua
Rookie	Florida Complex League Tigers	Florida Complex League	Brayan Peña
Rookie	DSL Tigers 1	Dominican Summer League	Marco Yepez
Rookie	DSL Tigers 2	Dominican Summer League	Sandy Acevedo
