= Corey Julks =

American baseball player (born 1996)

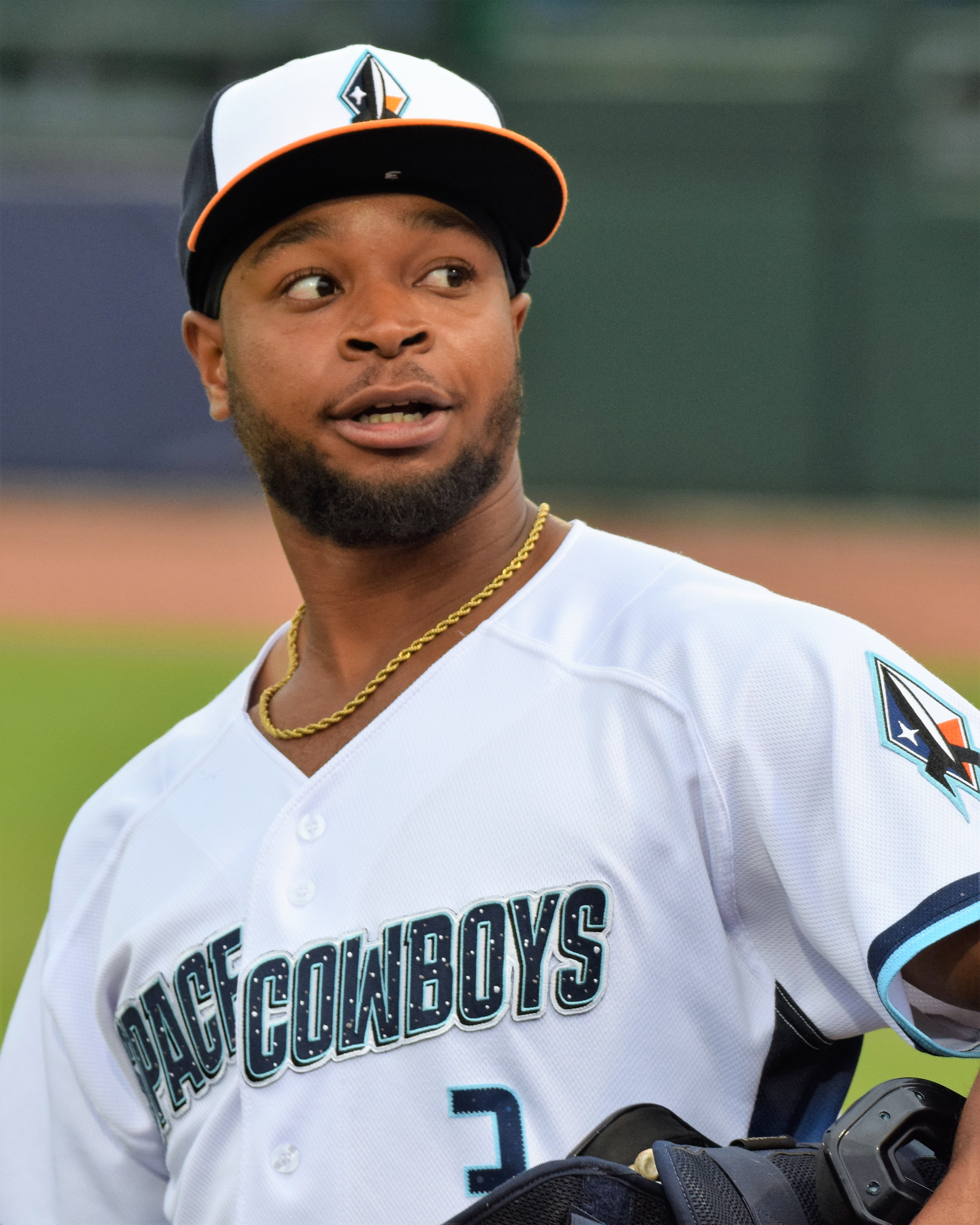
- Julks with the Sugar Land Space Cowboys in 2022

Free agent
- Outfielder / Designated hitter
- Born: February 27, 1996 (age 30); Friendswood, Texas, U.S.
- Bats: Right Throws: Right

MLB debut
- March 31, 2023, for the Houston Astros

MLB statistics (through 2026 season)
- Batting average: .235
- Home runs: 9
- Runs batted in: 48
- Stats at Baseball Reference

Teams
- Houston Astros (2023); Chicago White Sox (2024–2025); Detroit Tigers (2026)

Corey Christopher Julks (born February 27, 1996) is an American professional baseball outfielder and designated hitter who is a free agent. He has previously played in Major League Baseball (MLB) for the Houston Astros, Chicago White Sox, and Detroit Tigers.

== Early life and amateur career ==
As a youth, Corey Julks was coached by former major league relief pitcher, Chuck McElroy. Also playing for McElroy on his teams was his son, Satchel, whom Julks befriended.

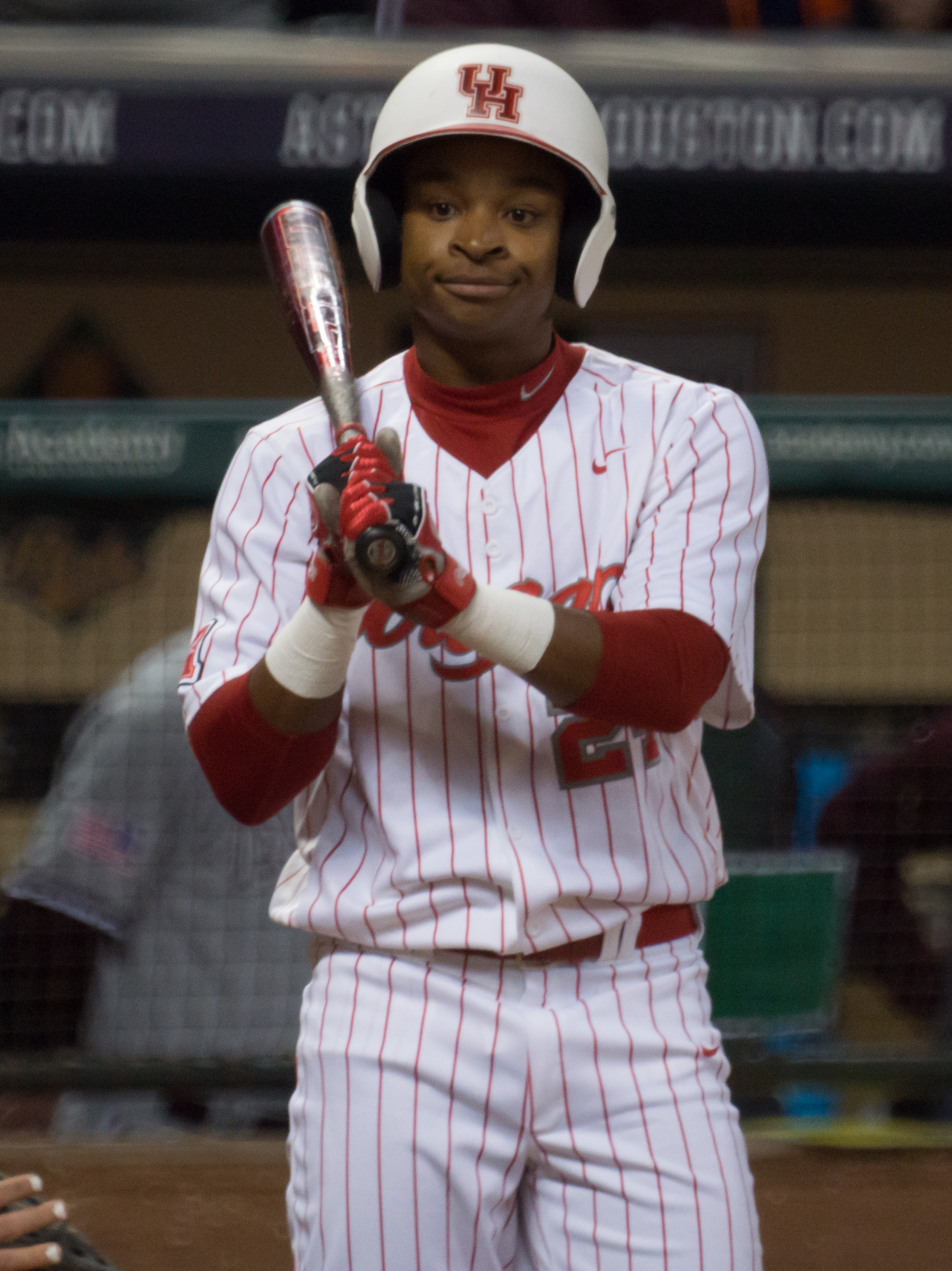
Julks with Houston in 2015

Julks attended Clear Brook High School in Friendswood, Texas, and played college baseball at the University of Houston for the Houston Cougars. In 2015, he played collegiate summer baseball with the Bourne Braves of the Cape Cod Baseball League. As a junior in 2017, he started 57 games and batted .335 with nine home runs, 45 RBIs, and 15 stolen bases. He was selected by the Houston Astros in the eighth round of the 2017 Major League Baseball (MLB) draft and signed.

== Professional career ==
=== Houston Astros ===
==== Minor leagues ====
Julks made his debut with the Tri-City ValleyCats of the Low-A New York–Penn League where he batted .176 over 32 games. He began the 2018 season with the Quad Cities River Bandits of the Single-A Midwest League before being promoted to the Buies Creek Astros of the High-A Carolina League. Over 125 games, he hit .270 with ten home runs and 62 RBIs. He split the 2019 season between the Fayetteville Woodpeckers of the High-A Carolina League and the Corpus Christi Hooks of the Double-A Texas League, batting .256 with four home runs and 41 RBIs over 107 games. He did not play a game in 2020 due to the cancellation of the minor league season.

Julks returned to Corpus Christi (now members of the Double-A Central) for the 2021 season. Over 85 games, he slashed .287/.349/.491 with 14 home runs, 36 RBIs, and 15 stolen bases. He was assigned to the Sugar Land Space Cowboys of the Triple-A Pacific Coast League for the 2022 season. Over 130 games, he compiled a .270/.351/.503 slash line with 31 home runs, 89 RBIs, and 22 stolen bases.

==== Major leagues ====
On March 28, 2023, it was announced that Julks had made the Astros’ Opening Day roster, his first selection to a Major League Baseball (MLB) roster. The Astros selected his contract on March 30. He made his MLB debut on March 31 versus the Chicago White Sox, starting as the designated hitter (DH). In his first at-bat, Julks singled off Lance Lynn for his first major league hit. On April 12, he hit his first major league home run versus the Pittsburgh Pirates while facing Rich Hill, fueling a 7–0 Astros win. Julks' ninth-inning single on April 23 versus the Atlanta Braves drove in the go-ahead run as the Astros eventually won, 5–2.

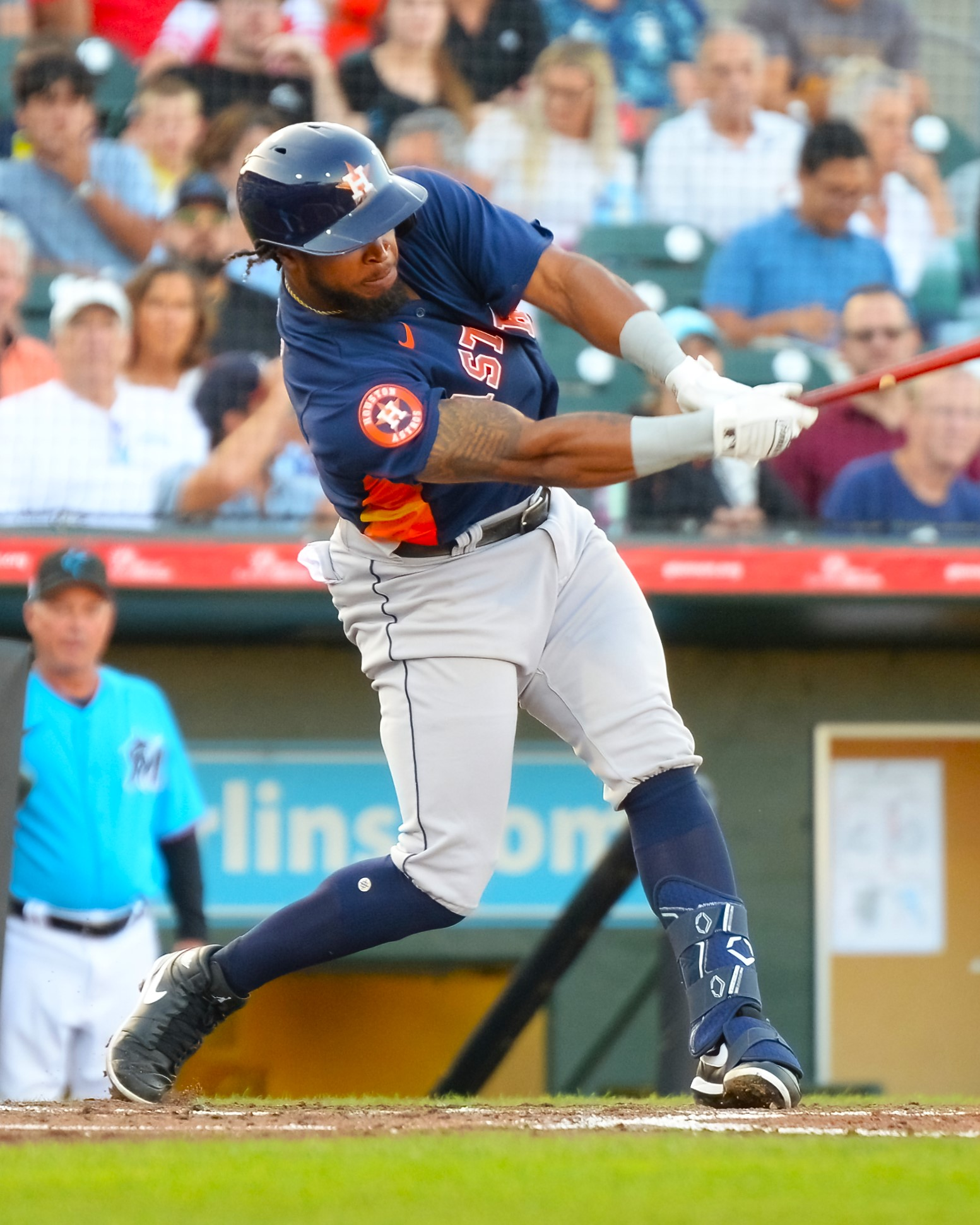
Julks with the Houston Astros in 2023

On June 5, Julks hit his first major league grand slam versus the Toronto Blue Jays while facing Alek Manoah, igniting an 11–4 win. On July 4, Julks collected his first career four-hit game to lead the Astros to a 4–1 win over the Colorado Rockies at Minute Maid Park. In 93 games during his rookie campaign, he batted .245/.297/.352 with six home runs, 33 RBI, and 15 stolen bases.

Julks was optioned to Triple–A Sugar Land to begin the 2024 season. On May 10, 2024, Julks was designated for assignment by the Astros.

=== Chicago White Sox ===
On May 15, 2024, Julks was traded to the Chicago White Sox in exchange for minor leaguer Luis Rodriguez. He was subsequently optioned to the Triple–A Charlotte Knights. In 66 games for Chicago, Julks slashed .214/.275/.306 with three home runs, 14 RBI, and five stolen bases.

On December 21, 2024, the White Sox designated Julks for assignment. He cleared waivers and was sent outright to Triple-A Charlotte on January 8, 2025. In 87 appearances for Charlotte, Julks slashed .295/.373/.470 with 10 home runs, 46 RBI, and 13 stolen bases. On August 1, the White Sox selected Julks' contract, adding him back to their active roster. In four appearances for Chicago, he went 3-for-8 (.375) with no home runs or RBI. Julks was designated for assignment by the White Sox on August 12. He cleared waivers and was sent outright to Triple-A Charlotte on August 14. On September 23, the White Sox added Julks back to their active roster. He made two additional appearances for Chicago, going hitless in four at-bats. On October 13, Julks was removed from the 40-man roster and sent outright to Charlotte. He elected free agency on October 15.

=== Detroit Tigers ===
On January 22, 2026, Julks signed a minor league contract with the Detroit Tigers. In his first 86 appearances for the Triple–A Toledo Mud Hens, he slashed .273/.347/.453 with 15 home runs, 54 RBI, and nine stolen bases. On August 12, Julks was promoted to major leagues to replace Riley Greene, who had been placed on the injured list due to a hamstring strain. He appeared in four games for the Tigers and had two hits across seven at–bats. On November 2, Julks was removed from the 40–man roster and sent outright to Triple–A Toledo, after which he elected free agency.
