= Trei Cruz =

Canadian baseball player (born 1998)

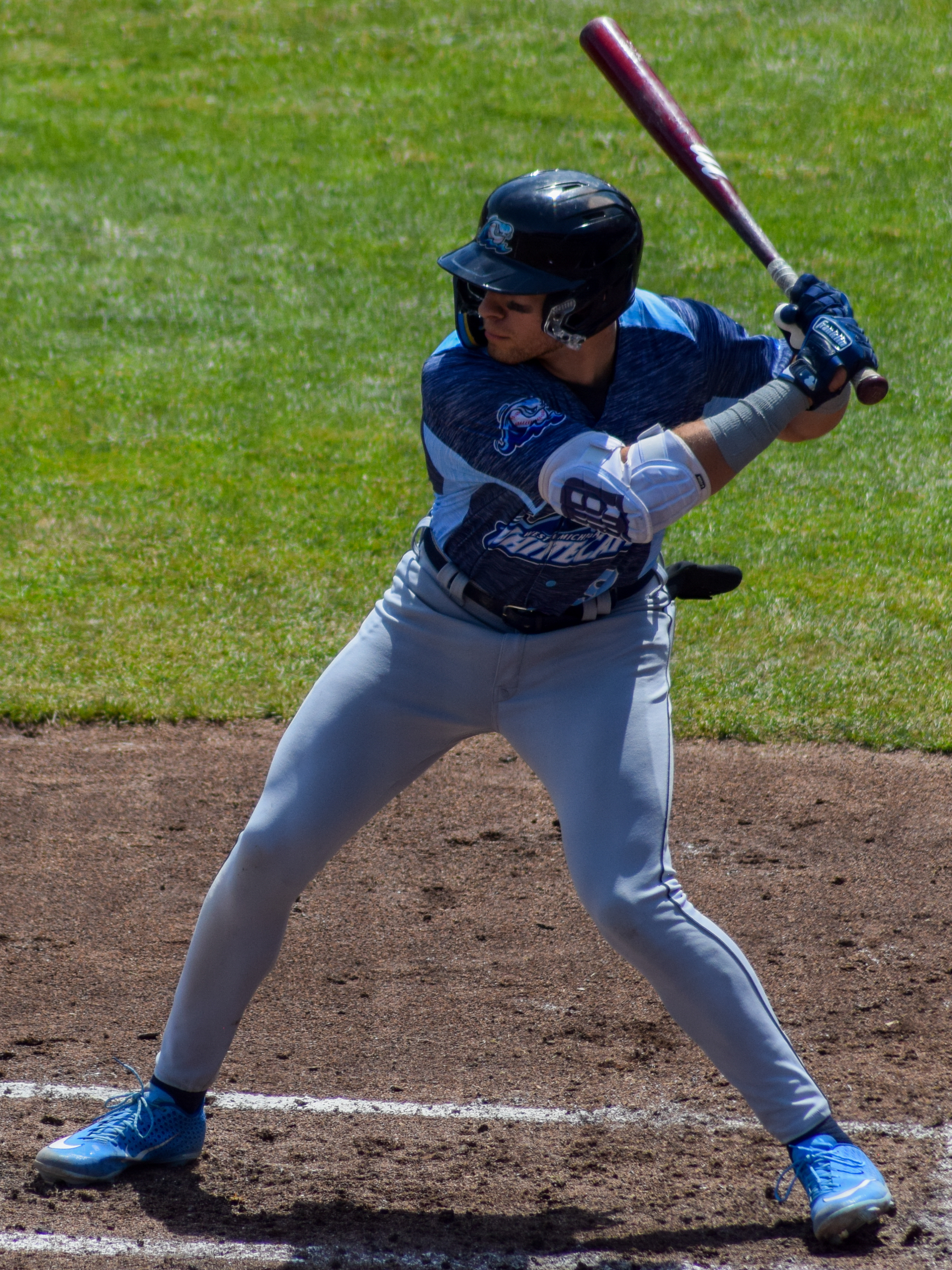
- Cruz with the West Michigan Whitecaps in 2022

Free agent
- Utility player
- Born: July 5, 1998 (age 28); Toronto, Ontario, Canada
- Bats: Switch Throws: Right

MLB debut
- June 19, 2026, for the Detroit Tigers

MLB statistics (through 2026 season)
- Batting average: .000
- Home runs: 0
- Runs batted in: 0
- Stats at Baseball Reference

Teams
- Detroit Tigers (2026)

Trei Jose Cruz (born July 5, 1998) is a professional baseball utility player who is a free agent. He made his Major League Baseball (MLB) debut in 2026.

== Amateur career ==
Cruz attended Episcopal High School in Bellaire, Texas. He was selected by the Houston Astros in the 35th round of the 2017 Major League Baseball draft, but did not sign and played college baseball at Rice University. In 2019, he played collegiate summer baseball with the Falmouth Commodores of the Cape Cod Baseball League. Cruz was selected by the Washington Nationals in the 37th round of the 2019 MLB draft, but did not sign and returned to Rice.

== Professional career ==
Cruz was then selected by the Detroit Tigers in the third round (73rd overall) of the 2020 Major League Baseball draft and signed.

Cruz made 127 appearances split between the Double-A Erie SeaWolves and Triple-A Toledo Mud Hens, slashing .279/.411/.456 with 13 home runs, 66 RBI, and 17 stolen bases. On November 18, 2025, the Tigers added Cruz to their 40-man roster to protect him from the Rule 5 draft.

Cruz was optioned to Triple-A Toledo to begin the 2026 season. The Tigers called up Cruz on June 19, 2026, after an injury to outfielder Wenceel Pérez. He was put into the lineup that same day to make his Major League debut. Cruz appeared in two games for Detroit, going hitless with three strikeouts across five at–bats. On August 16, Cruz was designated for assignment by the Tigers. He cleared waivers and was sent outright to Triple–A Toledo two days later. He elected free agency on November 2.

== Personal life ==
Both his father, Jose Cruz Jr., and grandfather, José Cruz played in MLB.

== See also ==
- List of second-and third-generation Major League Baseball players
