= Keider Montero =

Venezuelan baseball player (born 2000)

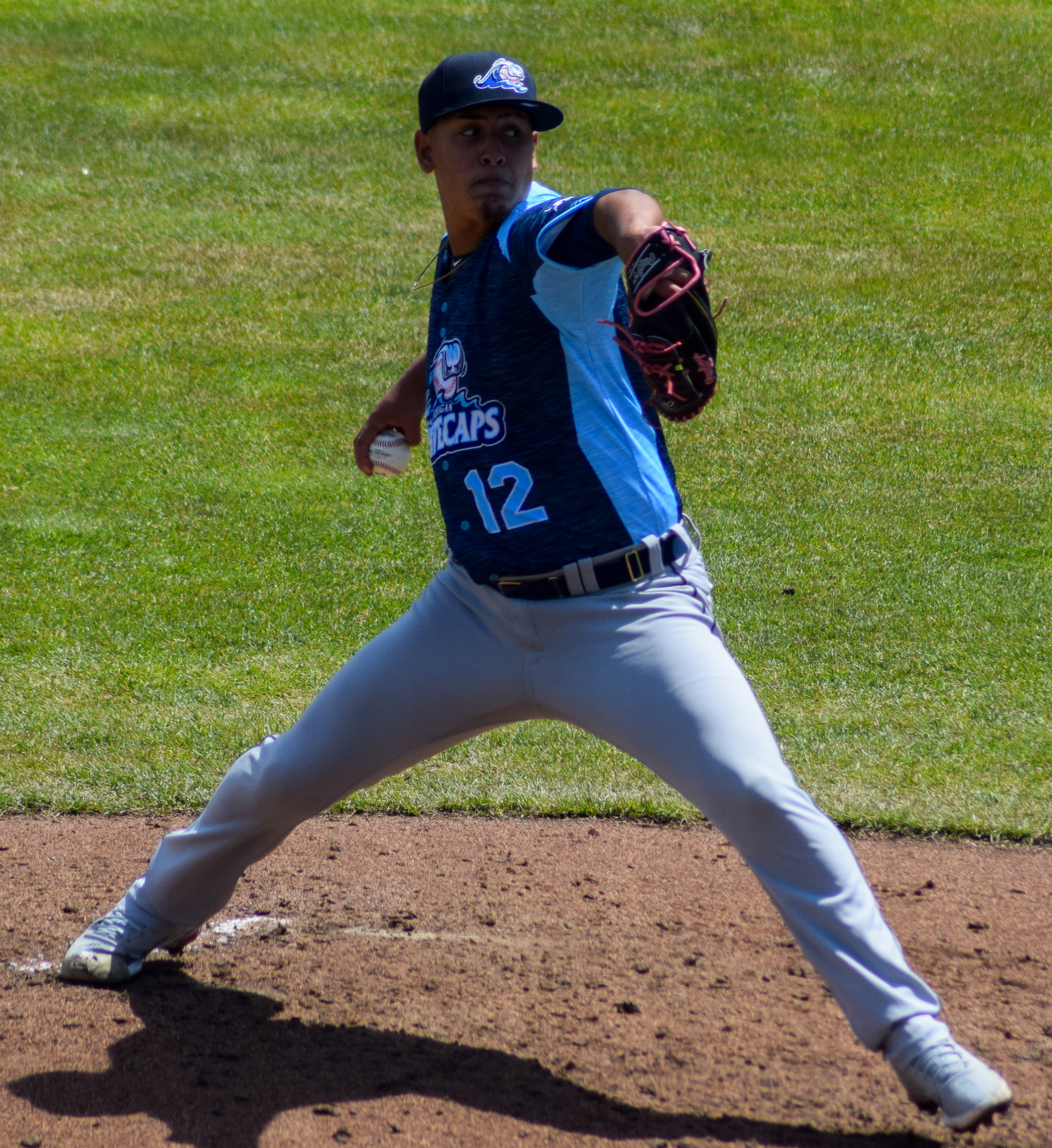
- Montero with the West Michigan Whitecaps in 2022

Detroit Tigers – No. 54
- Pitcher
- Born: July 6, 2000 (age 26); Santa Teresa del Tuy, Venezuela
- Bats: Right Throws: Right

MLB debut
- May 29, 2024, for the Detroit Tigers

MLB statistics (through 2026 season)
- Win–loss record: 21–18
- Earned run average: 4.08
- Strikeouts: 256
- Stats at Baseball Reference

Teams
- Detroit Tigers (2024–present)
Medals
Men's baseball
Representing Venezuela
World Baseball Classic
Gold medal – first place	2026 Miami	Team

Keider Eduardo Montero (born July 6, 2000) is a Venezuelan professional baseball pitcher for the Detroit Tigers of Major League Baseball (MLB). He made his MLB debut in 2024.

== Career ==
Montero signed with the Detroit Tigers as an international free agent on August 25, 2016. He made his professional debut in 2017 with the Dominican Summer League Tigers, posting a 4.02 ERA across 14 games (12 starts). Montero returned to the team the following year, recording a 2.14 ERA with 40 strikeouts across 15 contests.

Montero split the 2019 campaign with the rookie–level Gulf Coast League Tigers and Low–A Connecticut Tigers, making 10 combined starts and compiling a 4–3 record and 2.08 ERA with 49 strikeouts across 47 2/3 innings of work. He did not play in a game in 2020 due to the cancellation of the minor league season because of the COVID-19 pandemic.

Montero returned in action in 2021 to play for the High–A West Michigan Whitecaps, registering a 4–8 record and 5.28 ERA with 59 strikeouts across 15 starts. He remained with the club in 2022, posting a 7–7 record and 4.51 ERA with 101 strikeouts across 27 games (26 starts). Montero started 2023 with West Michigan before being promoted to the Double–A Erie SeaWolves and Triple–A Toledo Mud Hens. In 27 games (26 starts) between the three affiliates, he accumulated a 15–4 record and 4.66 ERA with 160 strikeouts across 127 1/3 innings pitched.

=== Detroit Tigers ===
==== 2024 ====
On November 14, 2023, the Tigers added Montero to their 40-man roster to protect him from the Rule 5 draft. He was optioned to Triple–A Toledo to begin the 2024 season. On May 29, 2024, Montero was promoted to the major leagues to make his Major League debut against the Pittsburgh Pirates in the second game of their doubleheader. He was the team's 27th man for the game and was sent down afterwards. He was called up again to start a game on June 26, but was sent down the next day when another pitcher was activated off the injured list. Montero was again called up on July 3, to start a game after starting pitcher Casey Mize had to be placed on the injured list. On September 10, he pitched a complete game shutout against the Colorado Rockies, while facing the minimum of 27 batters. He only allowed 3 hits, and all of them were forced out on double-plays. Montero made 19 appearances (16 starts) for Detroit during his rookie campaign, posting a 6–6 record and 4.76 ERA with 77 strikeouts across 98 1/3 innings pitched.

==== 2025 ====
Montero was optioned to Triple-A Toledo to begin the 2025 season. He was recalled April 15 in order to start the next day against the Milwaukee Brewers. Montero appeared in 20 games (12 starts) for the 2025 Tigers, posting a 5–3 record with a 4.37 ERA and 72 strikeouts in 90 2/3 innings. Montero earned a save in Game 1 of the 2025 American League Division Series against the Seattle Mariners, pitching a scoreless 11th inning.

==== 2026 ====
Montero was optioned to Triple-A Toledo to begin the 2026 season. He was recalled April 4 in order to start the next day after starting pitcher Justin Verlander had to be placed on the injured list. For the 2026 season, Montero made 32 appearances (25 starts) and posted a 10–9 record with a 3.48 ERA, 1.039 WHIP, and 107 strikeouts in 155 innings.

== Pitch selection ==
Montero is a right-handed pitcher who uses a five-pitch repertoire consisting of a four-seam fastball, sinker, slider, knuckle curve and changeup. His fastballs generally sit in the 94 to 96 MPH range, with his four-seamer topping out at 98 MPH. The increased use and effectiveness of his complete pitch mix was a feature of his 2026 development. Tigers manager A. J. Hinch noted that Montero had become more comfortable using multiple pitches in different parts of the strike zone, while Montero credited increased opportunity and his experience playing in the 2026 World Baseball Classic with helping his development.

== Personal Life ==
Montero has generally kept his personal life private. He was born in Santa Teresa del Tuy, Venezuela, and maintains a connection to his native country. In September 2026, the Tigers placed him on the paternity list so that he could travel to Venezuela for the birth of his first child, a daughter. Montero returned to the team on September 14 and made his next appearance on September 16 against the Toronto Blue Jays.
