= Brett Callahan =

American baseball player (born 2001)

Detroit Tigers – No. 34
- Outfielder
- Born: November 2, 2001 (age 24); Newark, Delaware, U.S.
- Bats: Left Throws: Right

MLB debut
- August 16, 2026, for the Detroit Tigers

MLB statistics (through September 19, 2026)
- Batting average: .220
- Home runs: 1
- Runs batted in: 8
- Stats at Baseball Reference

Teams
- Detroit Tigers (2026–present)

Brett Ryan Callahan (born November 2, 2001) is an American professional baseball outfielder for the Detroit Tigers of Major League Baseball (MLB). He made his MLB debut in 2026.

== Amateur career ==
Callahan attended Newark Charter School in Newark, Delaware and played college baseball at Saint Joseph's University. In 2023, he played collegiate summer baseball with the Bourne Braves of the Cape Cod Baseball League.

== Professional career ==
Callahan was selected by the Detroit Tigers in the 13th round (380th overall) of the 2023 Major League Baseball draft. He split his professional season between the rookie–level Florida Complex League Tigers and Single–A Lakeland Flying Tigers. Callahan split the 2024 campaign between the FCL Tigers, Lakeland, and the High–A West Michigan Whitecaps; he played 2025 with the FCL Tigers and West Michigan. Callahan started 2026 with the Double–A Erie SeaWolves before his promotion to the Triple–A Toledo Mud Hens.

On August 16, 2026, the Tigers selected Callahan's contract and added him to their active roster. He was added to the lineup that day to make his major league debut. Callahan hit a triple in his first at-bat on the first pitch he saw, driving in two runs in a 7–5 home loss to the Chicago White Sox.
