= John Peck (baseball) =

American baseball player (born 2002)

Detroit Tigers – No. 18
- Infielder
- Born: July 18, 2002 (age 24); Moorpark, California, U.S.
- Bats: Right Throws: Right

MLB debut
- August 31, 2026, for the Detroit Tigers

MLB statistics (through 2026 season)
- Batting average: .162
- Home runs: 0
- Runs batted in: 7
- Stats at Baseball Reference

Teams
- Detroit Tigers (2026–present)

John Sanford Peck (born July 18, 2002) is an American professional baseball infielder in the Detroit Tigers of Major League Baseball (MLB). He made his MLB debut in 2026.

== Amateur career ==
Peck attended Moorpark High School in Moorpark, California, and Pepperdine University, where he played college baseball for the Pepperdine Waves. In 2022, he played collegiate summer baseball with the Bourne Braves of the Cape Cod Baseball League.

== Professional career ==
The Detroit Tigers selected Peck in the seventh round of the 2023 Major League Baseball draft. He spent his professional season that year with the Florida Complex League Tigers and Lakeland Flying Tigers.

Peck played 2024 with the FCL Tigers, Lakeland and the West Michigan Whitecaps. He started 2025 with West Michigan before being promoted to the Erie SeaWolves. Peck was promoted to Triple-A Toledo Mud Hens in June 2026 but was placed on the injured list two days later. The Tigers purchased Peck's contract on August 31, 2026. He made his major league debut later that day as a defensive replacement in the 8th inning.
