= Drew Anderson (pitcher) =

American baseball player (born 1994)

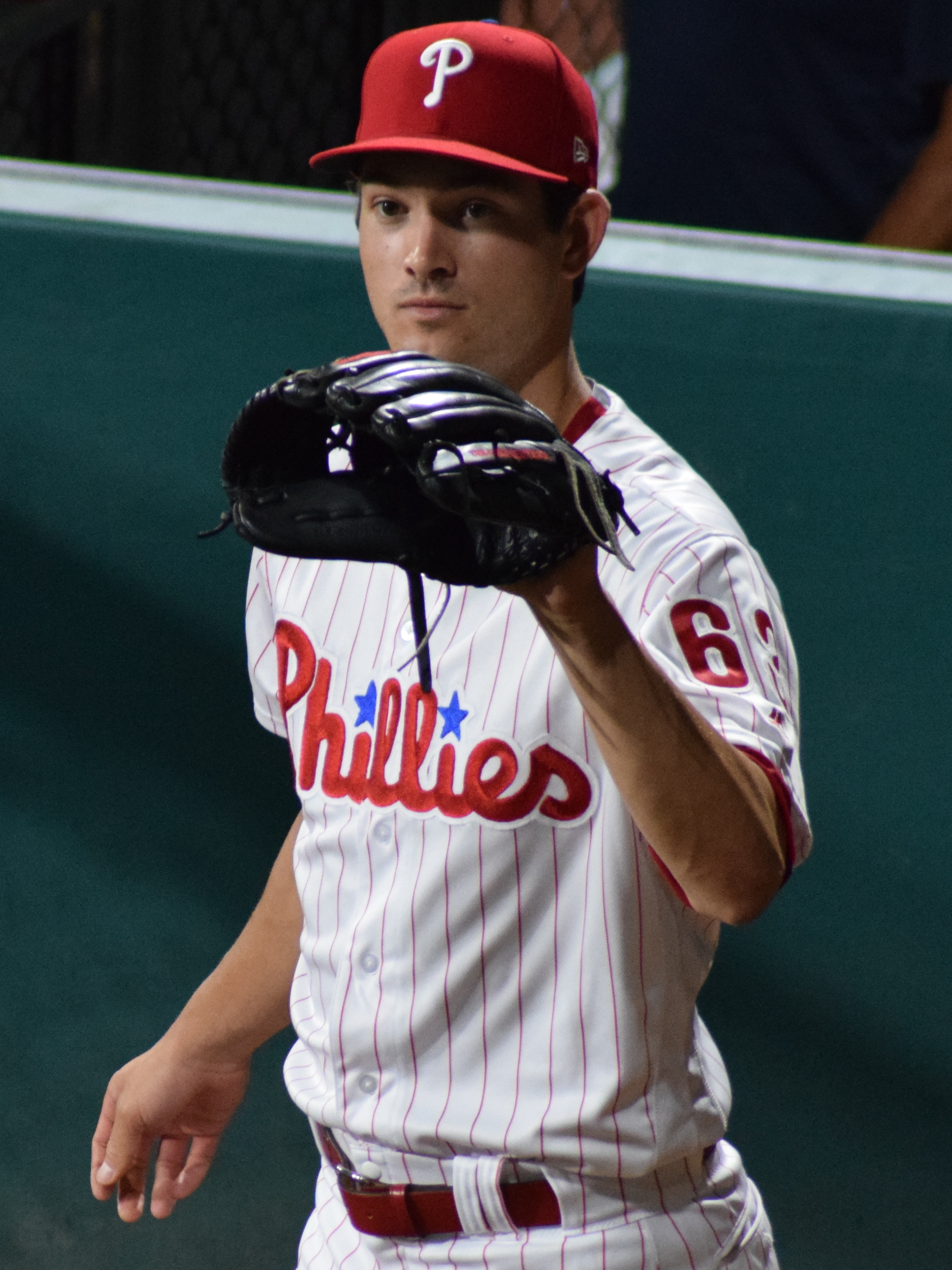
- Anderson with the Philadelphia Phillies in 2018

Detroit Tigers – No. 38
- Pitcher
- Born: March 22, 1994 (age 32); Reno, Nevada, U.S.
- Bats: Right Throws: Right

Professional debut
- MLB: August 1, 2017, for the Philadelphia Phillies
- NPB: May 17, 2022, for the Hiroshima Toyo Carp
- KBO: May 10, 2024, for the SSG Landers

MLB statistics (through 2026 season)
- Win–loss record: 6–10
- Earned run average: 4.49
- Strikeouts: 144

NPB statistics (through 2023 season)
- Win–loss record: 7–5
- Earned run average: 3.05
- Strikeouts: 98

KBO statistics (through 2025 season)
- Win–loss record: 23–10
- Earned run average: 3.38
- Strikeouts: 403
- Stats at Baseball Reference

Teams
- Philadelphia Phillies (2017–2019); Chicago White Sox (2020); Texas Rangers (2021); Hiroshima Toyo Carp (2022–2023); SSG Landers (2024–2025); Detroit Tigers (2026–present)

Andrew James Anderson (born March 22, 1994) is an American professional baseball pitcher for the Detroit Tigers of Major League Baseball (MLB). He has previously played in MLB for the Philadelphia Phillies, Chicago White Sox, and Texas Rangers. He has also played in Nippon Professional Baseball (NPB) for the Hiroshima Toyo Carp, and in the KBO League for the SSG Landers.

== Career ==
Anderson was born in Reno, Nevada, and attended Galena High School in Reno.

=== Philadelphia Phillies ===
He was drafted by the Philadelphia Phillies in the 21st round of the 2012 Major League Baseball draft. In 2013, he was an MiLB Philadelphia Phillies Organization All Star, as pitching for Williamsport he was 6–3 with a 2.00 ERA in 15 starts. He missed the 2015 season recovering from Tommy John surgery, that April 2. In 2016 pitching for Lakewood and Clearwater he was 3–4 with a 2.70 ERA in 15 starts.

The Phillies added him to their 40-man roster after the 2016 season. In 2017 as he played for Reading, he was the Eastern League Pitcher of the Week on both May 14 and June 4, and was an Eastern League Mid-Season All Star.

Anderson received his MLB call-up on August 1, 2017, to fill the open roster spot after the Phillies traded away Joaquín Benoit. After making his debut that day (on the road, against the Angels), he was optioned back to the Double–A Reading Fightin Phils the very next day. He appeared in one more major league game that season, August 26, at home against the Cubs. Over his two 2017 Phillies appearances, he pitched a total of 2 1/3 innings and allowed 6 earned runs. Pitching for Reading and the Lehigh Valley IronPigs, he was 9–4 with a 3.46 ERA in 22 starts.

In 2018 with the Phillies, he was 0–1 with a 4.97 ERA, and 11 strikeouts in 12 2/3 innings pitched. Pitching for the Lehigh Valley IronPigs he was 9–4 with a 3.87 ERA in 19 starts.

Anderson had a strong spring training with the Phillies in 2019, pitching to a 0.71 ERA in four starts. However, he did not make the team's Opening Day roster, and then struggled in Triple–A with the Lehigh Valley IronPigs before being designated for assignment on September 1 and released the following day. With Lehigh Valley in 2019 he was 0–6 with a 5.77 ERA in 11 starts (48 1/3 innings), and he pitched six innings with the Phillies in which he gave up five runs.

=== Chicago White Sox ===
On January 21, 2020, Anderson signed a minor league deal with the Chicago White Sox. On August 8, his contract was purchased and he was called up to the major leagues. He made his team debut that same day, allowing four runs over 1.1 innings pitched in relief. Anderson was designated for assignment on August 9. Anderson was released by the White Sox on September 3.

=== Texas Rangers ===
On January 5, 2021, Anderson signed a minor league contract with the Texas Rangers organization. On July 30, Texas selected Anderson's contract and promoted him to the active roster. Anderson made 9 appearances for Texas in 2021, going 1–1 with a 3.27 ERA and 9 strikeouts. On October 30, Anderson was released by the Rangers so he could pursue an opportunity in Asia.

=== Hiroshima Toyo Carp ===
On November 3, 2021, Anderson signed a $700K contract with the Hiroshima Toyo Carp of Nippon Professional Baseball.

In 21 appearances for the Carp in 2023, Anderson recorded a 2.20 ERA with 39 strikeouts across 45.0 innings pitched. On November 30, Hiroshima announced that Anderson would not be brought back in 2024, making him a free agent.

=== Detroit Tigers ===
On January 24, 2024, Anderson signed a minor league contract with the Detroit Tigers. In 9 appearances for the Triple–A Toledo Mud Hens, he recorded a 3.86 ERA with 16 strikeouts and one save across 14 innings pitched. On April 26, Anderson was released by the Tigers organization, permitting him to sign overseas.

=== SSG Landers ===
On April 27, 2024, Anderson signed with the SSG Landers of the KBO League. In 24 starts, he registered an 11–3 record with a 3.89 ERA and 158 strikeouts over 115 2/3 innings. He also became the fastest KBO pitcher to reach 100 strikeouts in a season.

On November 17, 2024, Anderson re-signed with SSG on a one-year, $1.2 million deal. During the 2025 season, Anderson logged a 12–7 record with a 2.27 ERA and 245 strikeouts across 171 2/3 innings pitched.

=== Detroit Tigers (second stint) ===
On December 8, 2025, Anderson signed a one-year, $7 million contract with the Detroit Tigers that includes a $10 million club option for the 2027 season.

On April 11, 2026, Anderson earned his first career save, pitching the final 3.1 innings of the Tigers 6–1 win over the Miami Marlins.

For the 2026 season, Anderson made 49 appearances (11 starts), posting a 5–7 record, 3.67 ERA and 114 strikeouts in 108 innings. Over his last nine appearances, all starts, he pitched to a 2.84 ERA over 44 1/3 innings.

On November 2, 2026, the Tigers picked up the $10 million club option on Anderson for the 2027 season.
