= Troy Melton (baseball) =

American baseball player (born 2000)

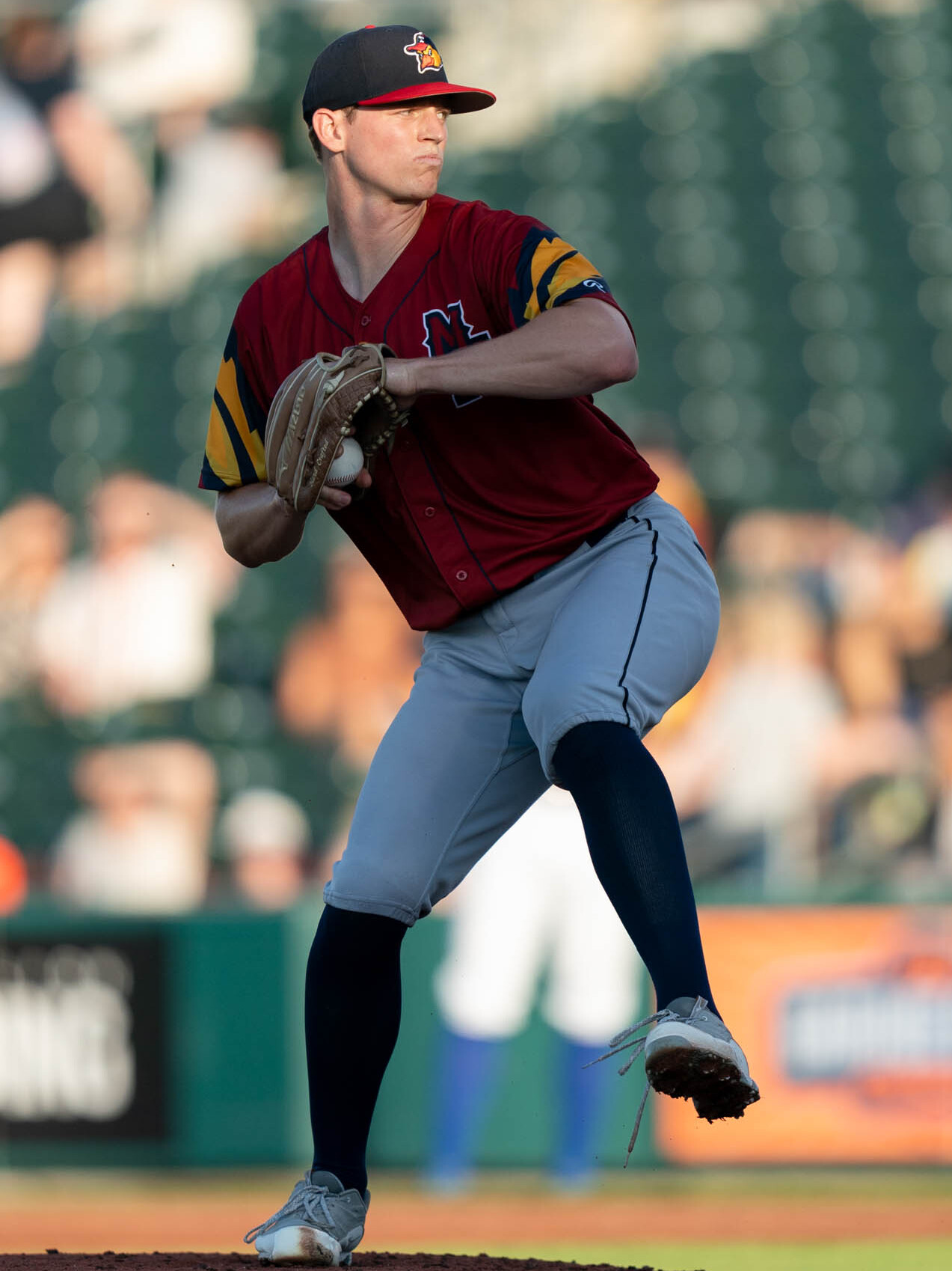
- Melton with the Toledo Mud Hens in 2025

Detroit Tigers – No. 52
- Pitcher
- Born: December 3, 2000 (age 25); Newport Beach, California, U.S.
- Bats: Right Throws: Right

MLB debut
- July 23, 2025, for the Detroit Tigers

MLB statistics (through 2026 season)
- Win–loss record: 11–7
- Earned run average: 2.76
- Strikeouts: 130
- Stats at Baseball Reference

Teams
- Detroit Tigers (2025–present)

Troy Edward Melton (born December 3, 2000) is an American professional baseball pitcher for the Detroit Tigers of Major League Baseball (MLB). He was selected by the Tigers in the fourth round of the 2022 MLB draft and made his MLB debut with the team in 2025.

== Amateur career ==
Melton attended Canyon High School in Anaheim, California, and played college baseball at San Diego State University. As a junior in 2022, he went 5–2 with a 2.07 ERA and 67 strikeouts over 65 1/3 innings. After the season, he was selected by the Detroit Tigers in the fourth round of the 2022 Major League Baseball draft and signed.

== Professional career ==
Melton made his professional debut with the Lakeland Flying Tigers, throwing a total of five innings for the season. He returned to Lakeland to open the 2023 season before being promoted to the West Michigan Whitecaps in mid-May. Over 23 games (22 starts) between the two teams, he went 3–1 with a 2.74 ERA and 94 strikeouts over 92 innings. Melton was assigned to the Erie SeaWolves to open the 2024 season. Over 23 starts, he pitched to a 7–8 record, a 5.10 ERA and 119 strikeouts over 100 2/3 innings. He missed time near the end of the season due to a shoulder injury. Melton returned to Erie to open the 2025 season and was promoted to the Toledo Mud Hens in early June. Over 18 games pitched with the two teams, he posted a 2-3 record, a 2.99 ERA and 101 strikeouts.

On July 23, 2025, Melton was selected to the 40-man roster and promoted to the major leagues for the first time. He made his first start that afternoon against the Pittsburgh Pirates. In his second career major league start on July 28 (his first start at home), Melton earned his first win by defeating the Arizona Diamondbacks in a 5–1 victory. Melton threw seven scoreless innings during the game, giving up five hits and no walks, with five strikeouts. Over 16 appearances (four starts) for Detroit during the regular season, Melton went 3–2 with a 2.76 ERA over 45 2/3 innings.

On October 4, 2025, Melton made his first career postseason start in Game 1 of the 2025 American League Division Series versus the Seattle Mariners at T-Mobile Park. He gave up one earned run (a solo home run), walked one batter, and struck out four over four innings as the Tigers won 3–2. Following the season, Melton was named Detroit Sports Media's Tigers Rookie of the Year.

On March 10, 2026, Melton was placed on the 60-day injured list due to right elbow inflammation. He was activated on May 24 and made his first start of the season the following day against the Baltimore Orioles. Melton was placed back on the injured list on September 21 and shut down for the rest of the season with arm fatigue. In total, he made 20 starts for Detroit and ended the season with an 8–5 record, a 2.76 ERA and 94 strikeouts across 114 1/3 innings.
