= Andrew Sears (baseball) =

American baseball player (born 2002)

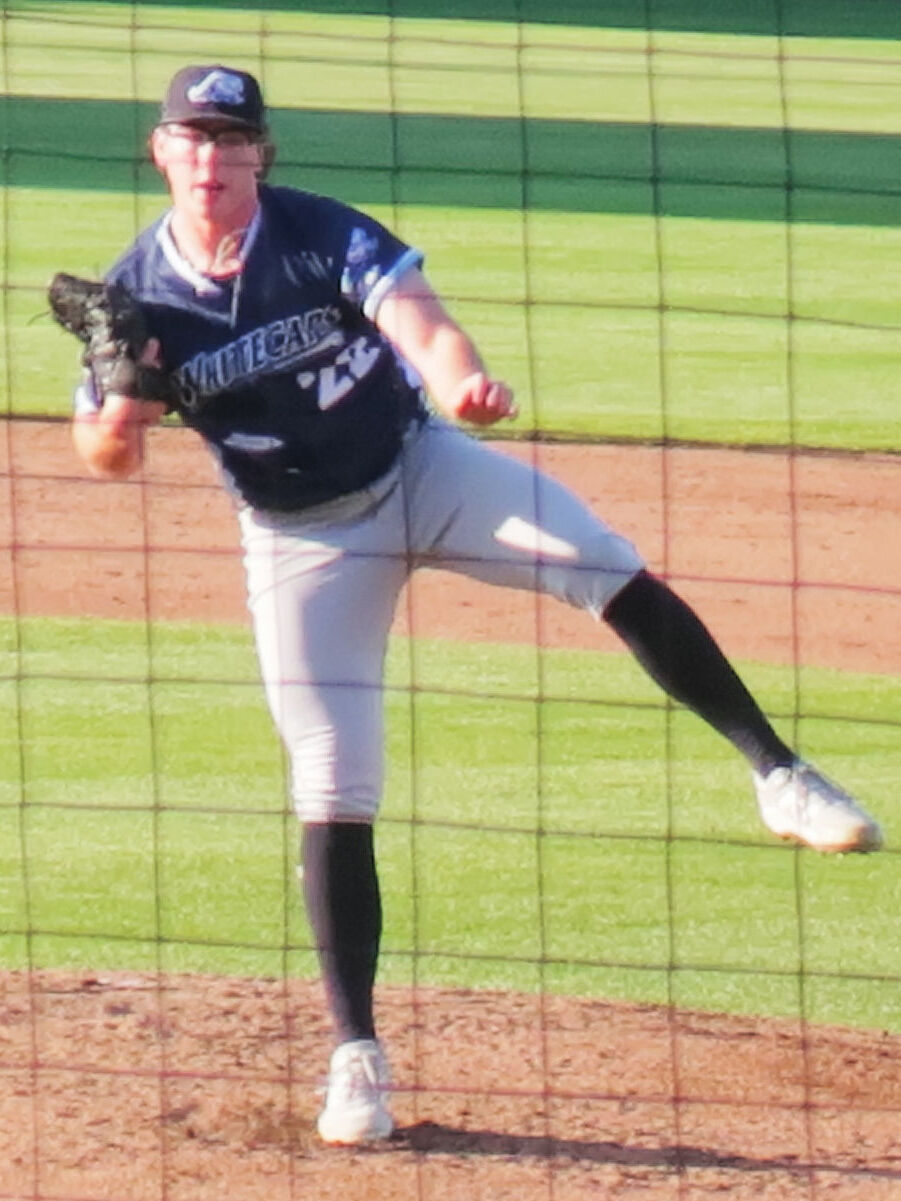
- Sears with the West Michigan Whitecaps in 2026

Detroit Tigers – No. 64
- Pitcher
- Born: October 30, 2002 (age 23); West Warwick, Rhode Island, U.S.
- Bats: Left Throws: Left

MLB debut
- August 23, 2026, for the Detroit Tigers

MLB statistics (through September 25, 2026)
- Win–loss record: 0–1
- Earned run average: 7.11
- Strikeouts: 15
- Stats at Baseball Reference

Teams
- Detroit Tigers (2026–present)

Andrew Warren Sears (born October 30, 2002) is an American professional baseball pitcher for the Detroit Tigers of Major League Baseball (MLB). He debuted in MLB in 2026.

== Amateur career ==
Sears attended West Warwick High School in West Warwick, Rhode Island and played college baseball at Rhode Island College and the University of Connecticut.

== Professional career ==
The Detroit Tigers selected Sears in the 10th round of the 2023 Major League Baseball draft.

Sears made his professional debut with the rookie–level Florida Complex League Tigers and pitched 2024 with the Single–A Lakeland Flying Tigers. He started 2025 with the High–A West Michigan Whitecaps before being promoted to the Double–A Erie SeaWolves.

In 2026, Sears made 16 appearances (12 starts) split between the FCL Tigers, West Michigan, Erie, and the Triple–A Toledo Mud Hens, accumulating a 3–2 record and 2.16 ERA with 67 strikeouts. On August 23, 2026, Sears was selected to the 40–man roster and promoted to the major leagues for the first time.
