= Wenceel Pérez =

Dominican baseball player (born 1999)

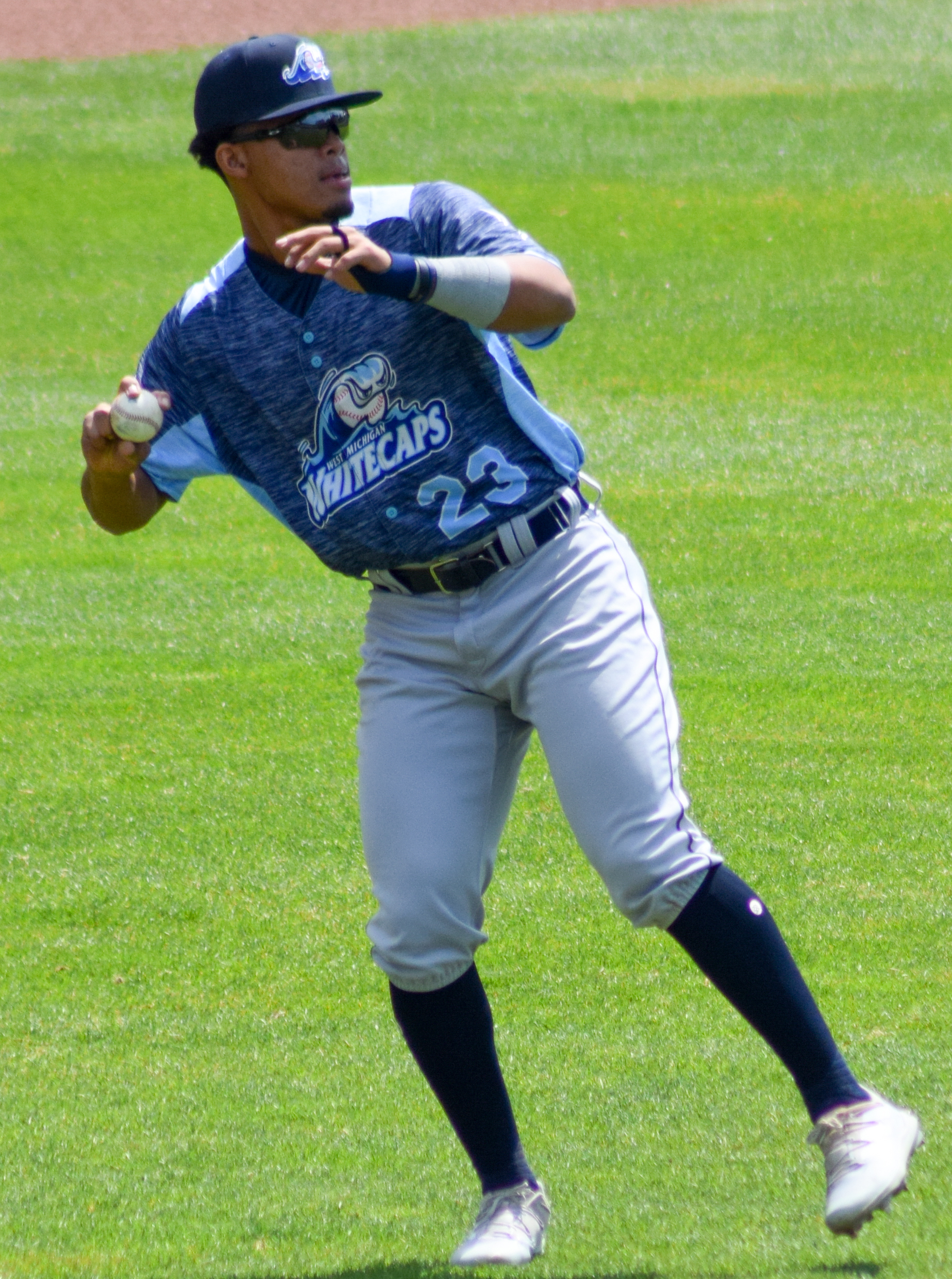
- Pérez with the West Michigan Whitecaps in 2022

Detroit Tigers – No. 46
- Outfielder / Infielder
- Born: October 30, 1999 (age 26); Azua, Dominican Republic
- Bats: Switch Throws: Right

MLB debut
- April 8, 2024, for the Detroit Tigers

MLB statistics (through June 11, 2026)
- Batting average: .233
- Home runs: 29
- Runs batted in: 97
- Stats at Baseball Reference

Teams
- Detroit Tigers (2024–present)

Wenceel Xavier Pérez (born October 30, 1999) is a Dominican professional baseball outfielder for the Detroit Tigers of Major League Baseball (MLB). He made his MLB debut in 2024.

== Career ==
=== Minor leagues ===
Pérez signed with the Detroit Tigers as an international free agent on July 2, 2016, and would be assigned to the Dominican Summer League Tigers as his first professional stop a year later in 2017. Over his first 61 games, he would hit .314 with a .387 OBP, while walking 27 times compared to 21 strikeouts. Pérez would also steal sixteen bases and earn a call-up to the rookie-level Gulf Coast League Tigers in 2018. Pérez quickly earned a jump up to the Low-A Connecticut Tigers after hitting .383 with a .462 OBP in his twenty games, and he would be called up to the High-A West Michigan Whitecaps after just a month in Connecticut.

Pérez made an impact in his debut in West Michigan with a four-for-four night including two runs scored. He would hit .309 with West Michigan over sixteen games, and would begin his 2019 season with the Whitecaps. He was named to the Detroit Tigers' Top 30 Prospects List by MLB.com ahead of the 2019 season at #12. He spent the full 2019 season with West Michigan. Over 124 games, Pérez batted .233 with an OBP of .299. He hit three home runs, 16 doubles, six triples, and finished with 30 RBI while stealing 21 bases. Pérez did not play in a game in 2020 due to the cancellation of the minor league season because of the COVID-19 pandemic.

Pérez returned to action in 2021 with Lakeland and West Michigan. In 113 appearances split between the two affiliates, he batted a combined .256/.329/.360 with four home runs, 43 RBI, and 22 stolen bases. In 2022, Pérez made 94 appearances split between West Michigan and the Double-A Erie SeaWolves, slashing a cumulative .295/.369/.534 with 14 home runs, 66 RBI, and 18 stolen bases.

=== Detroit Tigers ===
On November 15, 2022, the Tigers added Pérez to their 40-man roster to protect him from the Rule 5 draft. Pérez was optioned to the Triple-A Toledo Mud Hens to begin the 2023 season. He played in 116 games split between the Single–A Lakeland Flying Tigers, Erie, and Toledo, accumulating a .274/.368/.417 batting line with 9 home runs, 48 RBI, and 26 stolen bases. Pérez was again optioned to Triple–A Toledo to begin the 2024 season.

==== 2024 ====
On April 8, 2024, Pérez was promoted to the major leagues for the first time. In his first MLB at-bat, on Apr 13, he hit a single off Minnesota Twins pitcher Simeon Woods Richardson and subsequently stole second base. On April 28, in a game against the Kansas City Royals, Pérez hit his first MLB home run off of Michael Wacha. Pérez made 112 appearances for Detroit during his rookie campaign, batting .242/.300/.383 with nine home runs, 37 RBI, and nine stolen bases.

==== 2025 ====
Pérez began the 2025 season on the injured list with lumbar spine inflammation. He was transferred to the 60-day injured list on April 8. After being activated off the injured list on May 27, 2025, Pérez homered in his first at-bat. In 100 games for the Tigers, he hit .244 with 13 home runs and 43 RBI.

==== 2026 ====
Pérez was optioned to Triple-A Toledo to begin the 2026 season. He was selected to the major league roster on April 10, following an injury to Parker Meadows. On June 19, Pérez was placed on the 10-day injured list after he sustained a fractured orbital in a freak accident while training in Houston, Texas. He was transferred to the 60-day injured list the following week to make room on the 40-man roster for a waiver claim.
