= Parker Meadows =

American baseball player (born 1999)

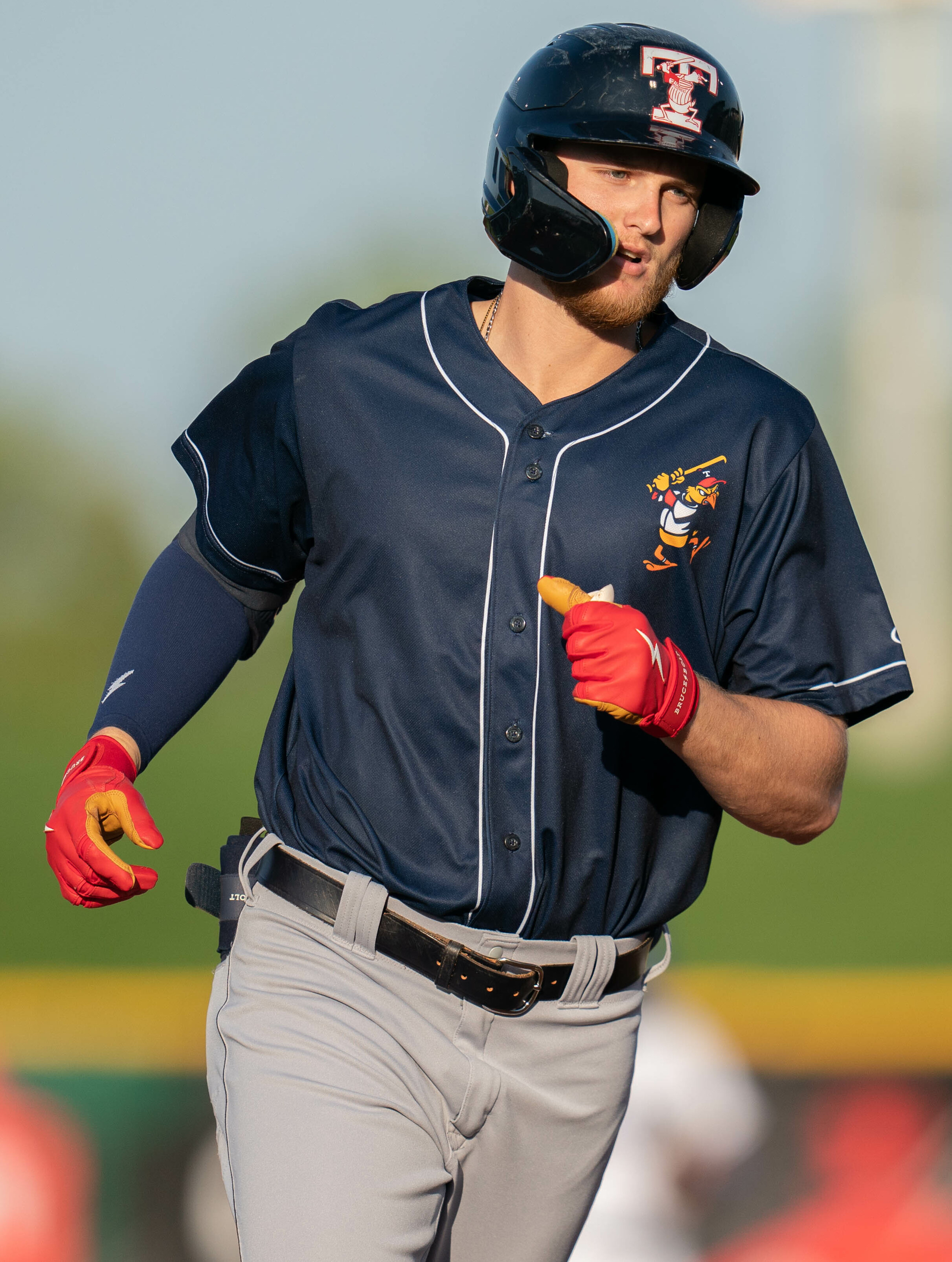
- Meadows with the Toledo Mud Hens in 2023

Detroit Tigers – No. 22
- Outfielder
- Born: November 2, 1999 (age 26); Atlanta, Georgia, U.S.
- Bats: Left Throws: Right

MLB debut
- August 21, 2023, for the Detroit Tigers

MLB statistics (through 2025 season)
- Batting average: .232
- Home runs: 16
- Runs batted in: 57
- Stolen bases: 21
- Stats at Baseball Reference

Teams
- Detroit Tigers (2023–present)

Parker Meadows (born November 2, 1999) is an American professional baseball outfielder for the Detroit Tigers of Major League Baseball (MLB). He made his MLB debut in 2023.

== Early life ==
Meadows attended Grayson High School in Loganville, Georgia, the same school as his brother Austin Meadows, a fellow professional baseball player.

== Professional career ==
The Detroit Tigers selected Meadows in the second round, with the 44th overall selection, of the 2018 MLB draft. Meadows signed with the Tigers organization and received a $2.5 million signing bonus, nearly a full $1 million above the slot value for the 44th overall pick. Meadows began his professional career with the rookie-level Gulf Coast League Tigers, where he hit .284 with an OBP of .376, to go with four home runs in just 22 games. He would get called up to the Low-A Connecticut Tigers to finish the rest of the 2018 campaign where he continued the strong start to his professional career, going 6-for-19 (.316 average) in his six games at that level. In the lead-up to, and following, the 2019 season, he would be listed within the top 12 Tigers prospects in the organization by various outlets, including a rating as high as ninth.

In that 2019 season, Meadows spent the entire year with the Single-A West Michigan Whitecaps. Meadows saw a dip in productivity, falling to a .221 batting average and .296 OBP, however he also hit seven home runs and drove in 40 RBIs while stealing 14 bases. He walked 47 times over the course of the season, though he struck out 113 times as well. Meadows was not selected to be part of the Tigers alternate training squad for the shortened 2020 MLB season, however, with the cancellation of the 2020 minor league season, Meadows continued to work out at his parents' residence in Loganville and Grayson High School. On September 3, Meadows was among four Tigers minor league players called up for the Tigers' alternate training site in Toledo.

On November 15, 2022, the Tigers added Meadows to their 40-man roster to protect him from the Rule 5 draft. Meadows was optioned to the Triple-A Toledo Mud Hens to begin the 2023 season. Meadows' contract was selected by the Tigers on August 21, and he made his major league debut against the Chicago Cubs that evening. In his third at-bat, Meadows singled off Cubs starter Javier Assad for his first major league hit. His first MLB home run was a three-run walk-off to right field off Ryan Pressly on August 25 that ended a 4–1 home win over the Houston Astros.

On May 8, 2024, following a poor start to the 2024 season (7-for-73, .096 BA), Meadows was again optioned to the Mud Hens. He was recalled on July 5, and hit .299 over the remainder of the season. Overall, he played 82 games for the Tigers, hitting .244 with 9 home runs and 27 RBI.

On February 22, 2025, in the first Grapefruit League game, he suffered an injury to the musculocutaneous nerve in his upper right arm. He missed Opening Day after being placed on the 60-day injured list on March 24. On June 2, Meadows was activated from the injured list. He played in 58 games for the Tigers, hitting .215 with four home runs and 16 RBI.

On April 10, 2026, Meadows was placed on the injured list due to a concussion, fractured left radius bone, and five stitches required for his mouth; the injuries had been suffered when he collided with fellow outfielder Riley Greene in a game against the Minnesota Twins the previous day. Meadows was transferred to the 60-day injured list three days later.

== Personal life ==
On January 11, 2025, Meadows married his high school sweetheart Hailey (née Sales) Meadows.
