= Jack Little (pitcher) =

American baseball player (born 1998)

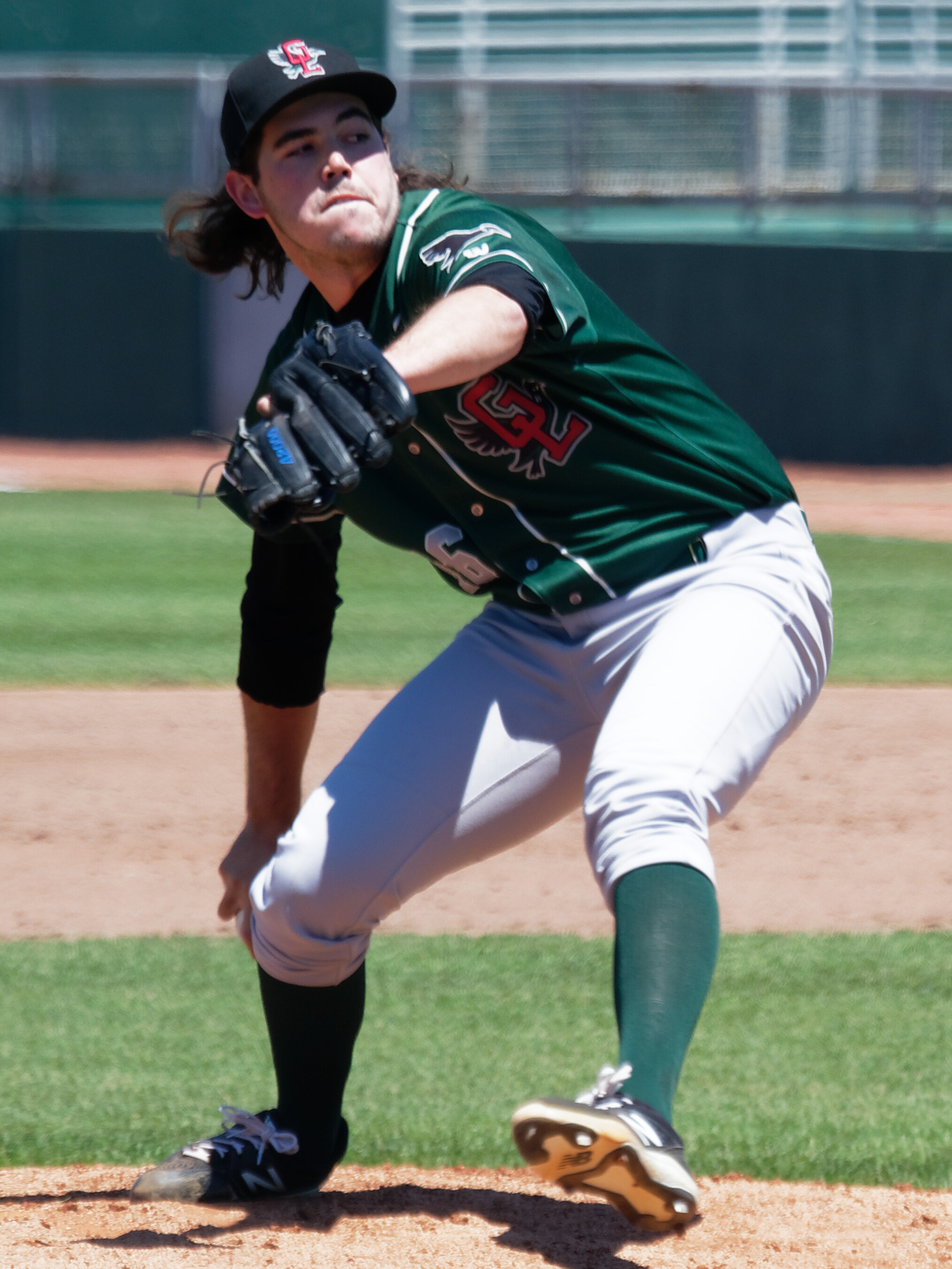
- Little with the Great Lakes Loons in 2021

Free agent
- Pitcher
- Born: January 10, 1998 (age 28); Louisville, Kentucky, U.S.
- Bats: Left Throws: Right

MLB debut
- June 19, 2025, for the Los Angeles Dodgers

MLB statistics (through 2025 season)
- Win–loss record: 0–0
- Earned run average: 6.00
- Strikeouts: 2
- Stats at Baseball Reference

Teams
- Los Angeles Dodgers (2025)

Jack Alan Little (born January 10, 1998) is an American professional baseball pitcher who is a free agent. He has previously played in Major League Baseball (MLB) for the Los Angeles Dodgers.

== Amateur career ==
Little played college baseball at Stanford University. In 2018, he played collegiate summer baseball with the Falmouth Commodores of the Cape Cod Baseball League. He was selected by the Los Angeles Dodgers in the fifth round (161st overall) of the 2019 Major League Baseball draft.

== Professional career ==
=== Los Angeles Dodgers ===
Little split his first professional season between the rookie-level Arizona League Dodgers and Single-A Great Lakes Loons. Little did not play in a game in 2020 due to the cancellation of the minor league season because of the COVID-19 pandemic.

Little returned to action in 2021 with the now High-A Great Lakes, posting a 3–1 record and 6.75 ERA with 31 strikeouts in 30 2/3 innings pitched across 24 games. He missed the entirety of the 2022 season after undergoing Tommy John surgery. Little made 20 relief outings for the Double-A Tulsa Drillers in 2023, but struggled to an 0–1 record and 7.71 ERA with 18 strikeouts across 18 2/3 innings pitched. He split the 2024 campaign between Tulsa and Triple-A Oklahoma City, accumulating a combined 3–2 record and 3.79 ERA with 63 strikeouts and five saves across 47 appearances.

Little began the 2025 season with Oklahoma City, posting a 3–2 record and 2.20 ERA with 33 strikeouts and 10 saves over 26 appearances. On June 19, he was selected to the 40-man roster and promoted to the major leagues for the first time. Little made his debut that night against the San Diego Padres, allowing two runs on four hits and a walk in two innings. He also recorded his first career MLB strikeout against Martín Maldonado. He pitched two games for the Dodgers, allowing two runs on four hits in three innings while also pitching to a 4.64 ERA in 36 games for Oklahoma City. Little was designated for assignment by the Dodgers on August 4.

=== Pittsburgh Pirates ===
On August 6, 2025, Little was claimed off waivers by the Pittsburgh Pirates He made 14 appearances for the Triple-A Indianapolis Indians, compiling a 2–1 record and 2.79 ERA with 14 strikeouts across 19 1/3 innings pitched.

=== Detroit Tigers ===
On November 6, 2025, Little was claimed off waivers by the Detroit Tigers. He was designated for assignment by the Tigers on November 18. On November 21, Little was non-tendered by Detroit and became a free agent.

On December 16, 2025, Little re-signed with the Tigers on a minor league contract. In 47 games (3 starts) with Triple-A Toledo Mud Hens he threw 61.1 innings going 1–3 with a 4.11 ERA with 60 strikeouts and 6 saves. He elected free agency on November 2.
