= Ben Malgeri =

American baseball player (born 2000)

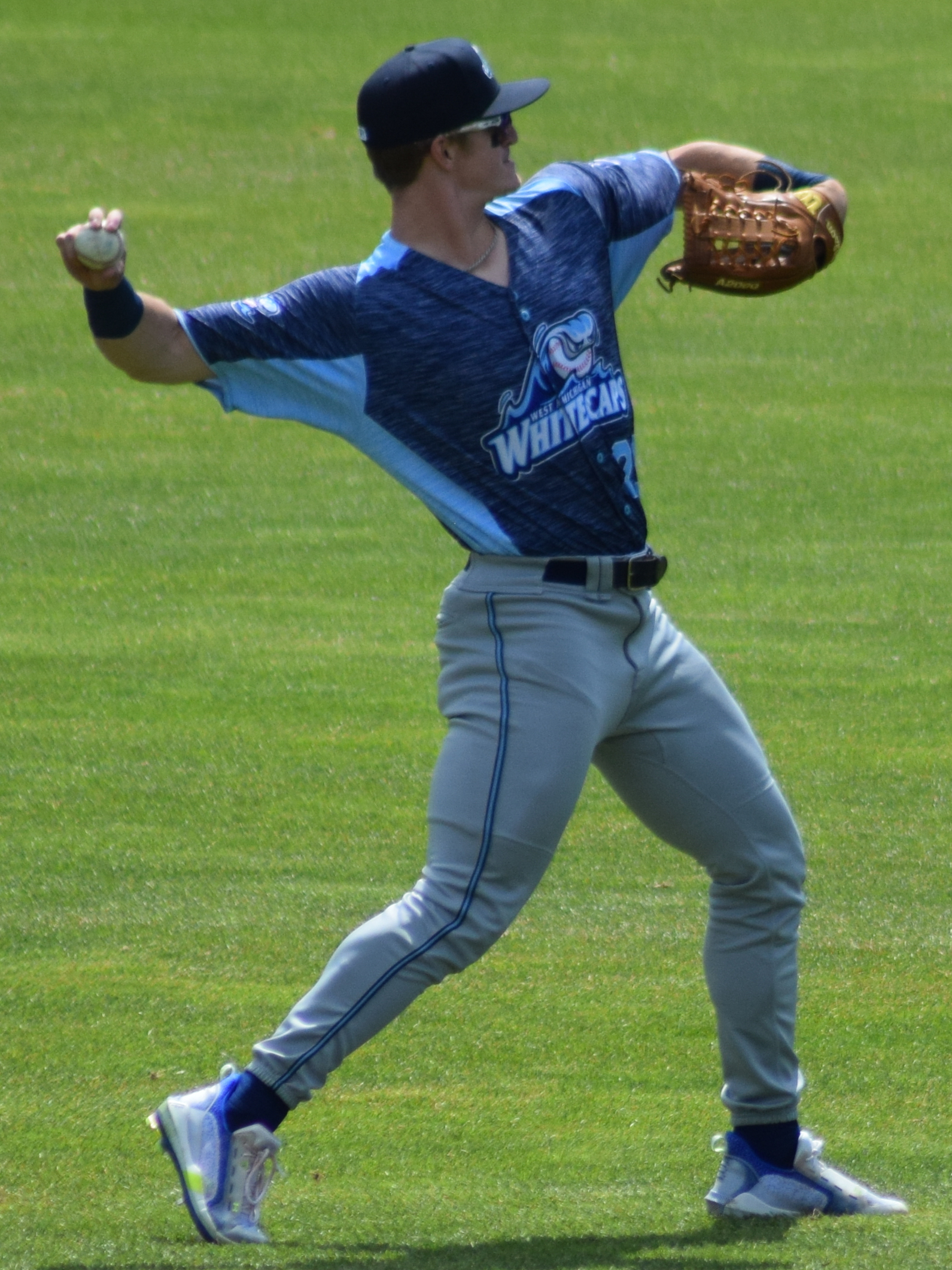
- Malgeri with the West Michigan Whitecaps in 2022

Detroit Tigers – No. 53
- Outfielder
- Born: January 12, 2000 (age 26); Exeter, New Hampshire, U.S.
- Bats: Right Throws: Right

MLB debut
- June 23, 2026, for the Detroit Tigers

MLB statistics (through 2026 season)
- Batting average: .250
- Home runs: 5
- Runs batted in: 20
- Stats at Baseball Reference

Teams
- Detroit Tigers (2026–present)

Benjamin Joseph Malgeri (born January 12, 2000) is an American professional baseball outfielder for the Detroit Tigers of Major League Baseball (MLB).

== Amateur career ==
A native of Stratham, New Hampshire, Malgeri played college baseball for Holy Cross and Northeastern University. In 2021, he played collegiate summer baseball with the Harwich Mariners of the Cape Cod Baseball League.

== Professional career ==
Malgeri was selected by the Detroit Tigers in the 18th round (525th overall) of the 2021 Major League Baseball draft. He was assigned to the Triple-A Toledo Mud Hens to begin the 2026 season, where he batted .296/.401/.496 with nine home runs, 34 RBI, and eight stolen bases across 65 appearances. On June 23, 2026, Malgeri was promoted to the major leagues for the first time.

On July 31, 2026, Malgeri hit his first major league home run, a two-run shot off of Athletics pitcher Luis Morales. In his first MLB season, he hit .250 with 5 home runs and 20 RBI in 60 games.
