= Jackson Jobe =

American baseball player (born 2002)

Detroit Tigers – No. 21
- Pitcher
- Born: July 30, 2002 (age 24); Irving, Texas, U.S.
- Bats: Right Throws: Right

MLB debut
- September 25, 2024, for the Detroit Tigers

MLB statistics (through 2026 season)
- Win–loss record: 7–4
- Earned run average: 3.91
- Strikeouts: 92
- Stats at Baseball Reference

Teams
- Detroit Tigers (2024–present)

Jackson William Jobe (born July 30, 2002) is an American professional baseball pitcher for the Detroit Tigers of Major League Baseball (MLB). Jobe was selected by the Tigers with the third overall pick in the 2021 MLB draft, and made his MLB debut in 2024.

== Amateur career ==
Jobe attended Heritage Hall School in Oklahoma City, Oklahoma, where he played football and baseball. He committed to play college baseball at Ole Miss. In 2018, his sophomore year, he was the starting quarterback for the football team and led them to an OSSAA AAA State Championship. During the summer of 2020, he participated in the Perfect Game All-American Classic at Chickasaw Bricktown Ballpark in Oklahoma City. As a senior in 2021, he threw two no-hitters and went 9–1 with a 0.13 ERA, five walks, and 122 strikeouts over 52 1/3 innings pitched, leading Heritage Hall to a state championship. He also batted .469 with six home runs and 38 RBIs. He was subsequently named the Oklahoma Gatorade Player of the Year.

== Professional career ==
The Detroit Tigers selected Jobe in the first round, with the third overall selection, of the 2021 Major League Baseball draft. He signed with the Tigers for a $6.9 million signing bonus.

Jobe made his professional debut in 2022 with the Lakeland Flying Tigers of the Single-A Florida State League. In mid-August, he was promoted to the West Michigan Whitecaps of the High-A Midwest League. Over 21 starts between the two teams, Jobe posted a 4–5 record with a 3.84 ERA and 81 strikeouts over 77 1/3 innings.

On March 16, 2023, Jobe was ruled out for 3–6 months after being diagnosed with lumbar spine inflammation. He returned and spent time playing with the Rookie-level Florida Complex League Tigers, Lakeland, West Michigan, and the Erie SeaWolves of the Double-A Eastern League, starting 16 games and going 2–4 with a 2.81 ERA and 84 strikeouts over 64 innings. After the season, he was selected to play in the Arizona Fall League for the Salt River Rafters.

In May 2024, MLB Pipeline ranked Jobe 10th on its top 100 prospects list. In 21 starts split between West Michigan, Erie, and the Triple–A Toledo Mud Hens, he accumulated a 5–3 record and 2.36 ERA with 96 strikeouts over 91 2/3 innings pitched.

On September 24, 2024, Jobe was selected to the 40-man roster and promoted to the major leagues for the first time. On September 25, Jobe made his Major League debut in the ninth inning against the Tampa Bay Rays, giving up only one hit through one inning. Jobe recorded his first Major League strikeout against Chicago White Sox shortstop Jacob Amaya.

Jobe made the Tigers' 2025 rotation as the No. 4 starter. He made his first start as a Tiger on March 31, 2025, against the Seattle Mariners, pitching four innings for a no-decision in the Tigers 9–6 win. On April 12, Jobe pitched six shutout innings to earn his first major league win as the Tigers beat the Minnesota Twins 4-0. Jobe suffered his first Major League loss on May 23, in a 3-1 defeat to the Cleveland Guardians. On May 30, the Tigers placed Jobe on the 15-day injured list, retroactive to May 29, with a grade 1 right elbow flexor strain. On June 11, it was announced that Jobe would undergo Tommy John surgery and miss the remainder of the season; in 10 starts for the team, he had logged a 4–1 record and 4.22 ERA with 39 strikeouts over 49 innings.

On August 7, 2026, Jobe was activated for his season debut and return from surgery. He made a total of nine starts for Detroit in 2026 and ended the season with a 3–3 record, a 3.91 ERA, and 51 strikeouts across 46 innings.

== Personal life ==
Jobe's father, Brandt Jobe, is a professional golfer.
