= Riley Greene =

American baseball player (born 2000)

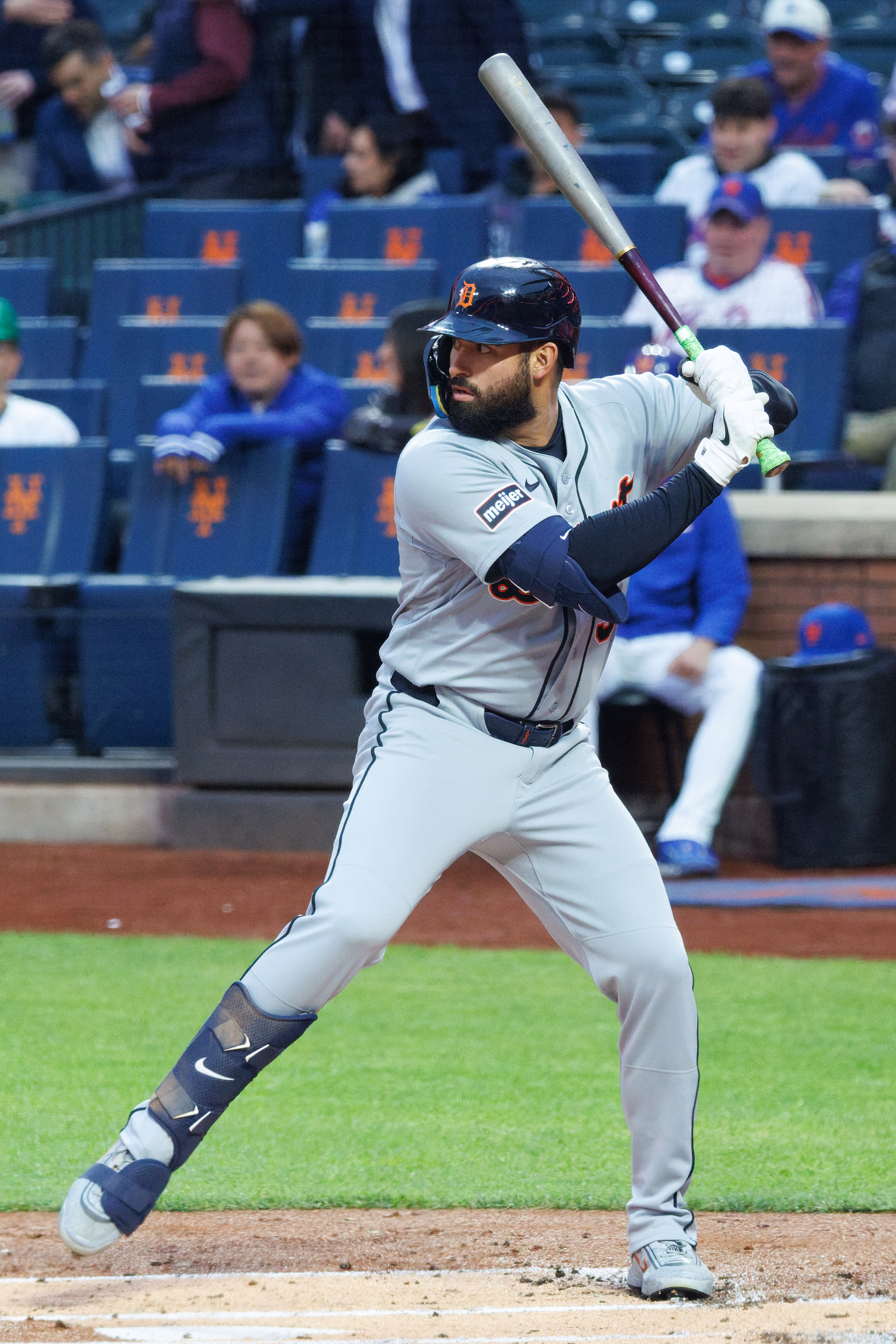
- Greene with the Tigers in 2026

Detroit Tigers – No. 31
- Outfielder
- Born: September 28, 2000 (age 26); Orlando, Florida, U.S.
- Bats: Left Throws: Left

MLB debut
- June 18, 2022, for the Detroit Tigers

MLB statistics (through 2026 season)
- Batting average: .268
- Home runs: 97
- Runs batted in: 339
- Stats at Baseball Reference

Teams
- Detroit Tigers (2022–present)

Career highlights and awards
- 3× All-Star (2024–2026); 2× Silver Slugger Award (2025, 2026)

Riley Alan Greene (born September 28, 2000) is an American professional baseball outfielder for the Detroit Tigers of Major League Baseball (MLB). He was drafted fifth overall by the Tigers in the 2019 MLB draft. He made his MLB debut in 2022, won his first Silver Slugger Award in 2025, and has been selected to three All-Star teams.

== Amateur career ==
Greene attended Paul J. Hagerty High School in Oviedo, Florida, where he played on their baseball team alongside Vaughn Grissom. In 2018, he played for Team USA in the U-18 Pan-American Championships. As a senior in 2019, he hit .422 with eight home runs and 27 runs batted in (RBIs). He committed to play college baseball at the University of Florida.

== Professional career ==
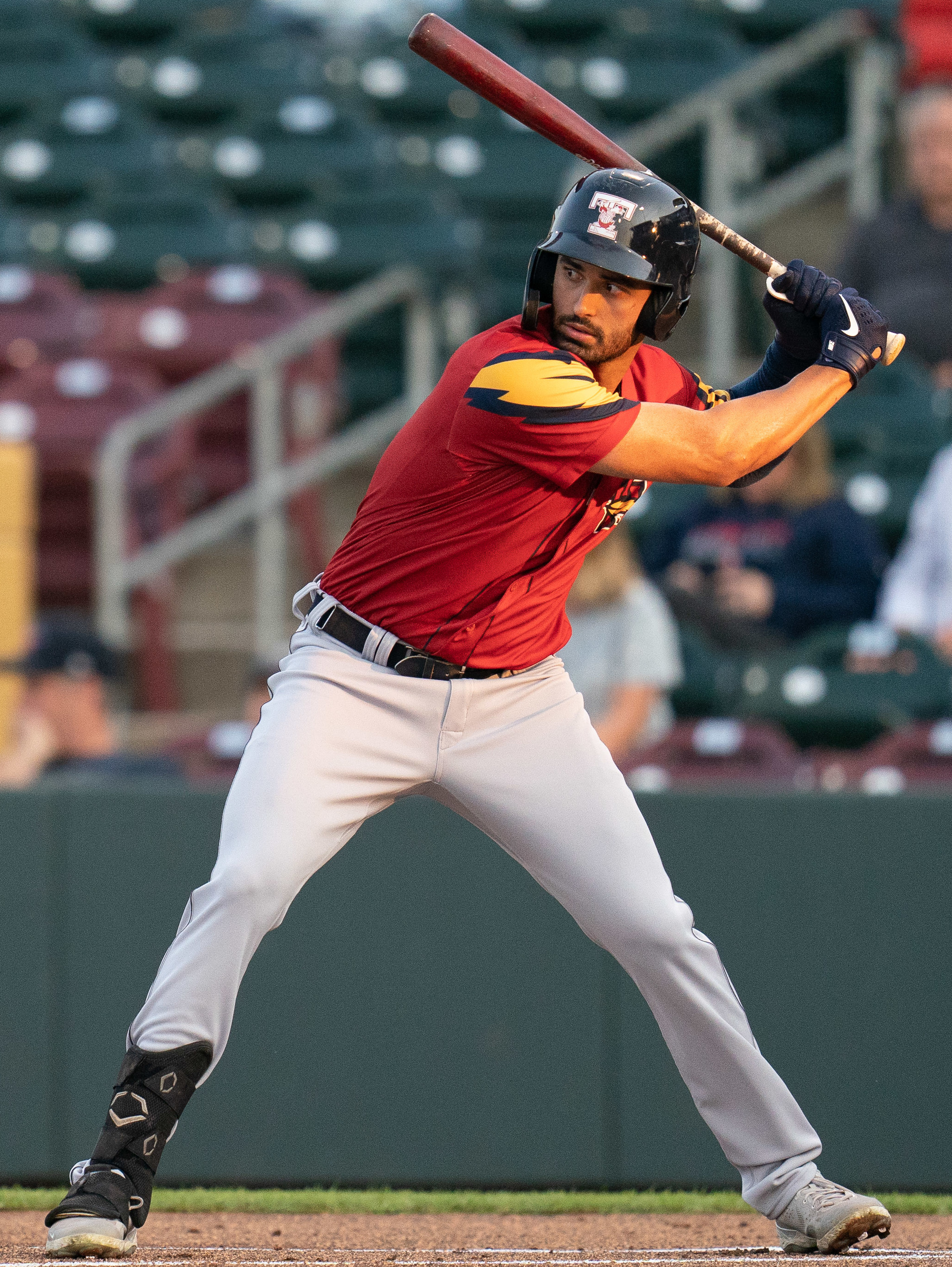
Greene with the Toledo Mud Hens in 2021

Greene was considered one of the top prospects for the 2019 Major League Baseball draft. He was drafted by the Detroit Tigers with the fifth overall pick. On June 5, the Tigers signed Greene to a contract with a $6.18 million signing bonus.

Greene made his professional debut on June 24, 2019, for the rookie-level Gulf Coast League Tigers. In July, he was promoted to the Connecticut Tigers of the Low–A New York-Penn League, and in August, he earned a promotion to the West Michigan Whitecaps of the Single–A Midwest League. Over 57 games between the three clubs, he slashed .271/.347/.403 with five home runs and 28 RBIs. Greene did not play in a game in 2020 due to the cancellation of the minor league season because of the COVID-19 pandemic.

Greene began the 2021 season with the Erie SeaWolves of the Double-A Northeast. In June, he was selected to represent the Tigers in the All-Star Futures Game alongside Spencer Torkelson. In August, he was promoted to the Toledo Mud Hens of the Triple-A East. Over 124 games between the two clubs, Greene slashed .301/.387/.534 with 24 home runs, 84 RBIs, 16 stolen bases, 25 doubles, and eight triples. He was named the 4th best prospect in baseball in Baseball America's annual Top 100 list for 2022.

The Tigers planned to include Greene on their Opening Day roster for the 2022 season, but he broke his right foot and missed the start of the season. On June 18, 2022, the Tigers purchased Greene's contract, adding him to the active roster, and he made his Major League debut that afternoon. In his first at-bat, he hit a single.

On July 2, 2022, Greene hit a walk-off home run off of Joel Payamps of the Kansas City Royals for his first career MLB home run. He became the first Tigers player since Lou Whitaker in 1978 to accomplish this feat. Greene was named the 2022 Detroit Tigers Rookie of the Year by the Detroit Sports Media Association and Tiger of the Year by the Detroit Chapter of the Baseball Writers' Association of America.

In 2023, Greene played in 99 games for Detroit, hitting .288/.349/.447 with 11 home runs, 37 RBI, and 7 stolen bases. On September 2, 2023, Greene was placed on the injured list with right elbow inflammation. On September 19, it was announced that he would undergo surgery to repair his non–throwing elbow. The next day, the Tigers announced that Greene had undergone Tommy John surgery, and would likely be ready by the start of the 2024 season.

On July 7, 2024, Greene was selected to represent the Tigers in the 2024 All-Star Game on July 16, along with teammate Tarik Skubal. At the time of his selection, Greene was hitting .258 with 17 home runs and 45 RBI. He ranked fourth among AL outfielders with an .863 OPS, and third among AL left fielders with a plus-8 Defensive Runs Saved rating. He entered the All-Star game as a reserve in left field, and went 0-for-2 at the plate. For the season, Greene hit .262/.348/.479 with 24 home runs and 74 RBIs in 137 games, as he helped the Tigers return to the playoffs after a 10-year drought.

On May 2, 2025, Greene became the first player in MLB history to hit 2 home runs in the 9th inning of a game. He was named AL Player of the Week for April 28-May 4 after hitting .464 with 13 hits, 4 home runs, 8 RBI and a 1.393 OPS. He had at least one hit in all seven games during the week, with three multi-hit games. On June 13, Greene went 2-for-4 with a home run and 4 RBIs against the Cincinnati Reds as he reached the 200-RBI mark for his career. Greene becomes the first player in Tigers franchise history to drive in 200 runs before turning age 25 since Travis Fryman in 1992. On July 2, Greene was voted in as a starting outfielder for the 2025 All-Star Game. It is his second consecutive All-Star selection, and first as a starter. At the All-Star break, Greene was hitting .284 with 24 home runs (equaling his 2024 season total) and 78 RBI. On August 26, 2025, Greene hit a grand slam homer at Sutter Health Park (the temporary Sacramento, CA home of the Athletics) that traveled an estimated 471 feet (143.6 meters) over the large "batter's eye" wall in center field. It was the longest home run by a Tiger in the Statcast era (since 2015) and the fourth longest homer in the majors to date in 2025.

Greene finished the 2025 regular season batting .258 with career highs in home runs (36) and RBI (111), becoming the first Tiger player to reach 35 home runs and 110 RBI since Miguel Cabrera in 2013. He also had the dubious distinction of becoming the 17th major league player and first Tiger to strike out at least 200 times in a season (201). His strikeout total surpassed the previous team high of 182, set by Cecil Fielder in 1990.

On January 6, 2026, the Tigers and Greene agreed on a one-year, $5 million contract, avoiding arbitration. On July 4, 2026, Greene was added as a reserve outfielder to the 2026 American League All-Star team, his third All-Star selection in as many years. At the time of his selection, he was hitting .292 with 13 home runs and 44 RBI. He is the first Tigers outfielder to make an All-Star team in at least three consecutive seasons since Al Kaline. While not voted in as a starting outfielder, Greene was named a starter by AL manager John Schneider due to injuries to starters Aaron Judge and Byron Buxton. Greene played in 140 games during the 2026 season, having spent three weeks on the injured list in August. He finished with a .280 batting average, 21 home runs, and 75 RBI. On November 17, he was awarded the AL Silver Slugger Award as an outfielder for the second consecutive season.
