= 2025 Detroit Tigers season =

Major League Baseball season

2025 Detroit Tigers
- American League Wild Card winners
- League: American League
- Division: Central
- Ballpark: Comerica Park
- City: Detroit, Michigan
- Record: 87–75 (.537)
- Divisional place: 2nd
- Owners: Christopher Ilitch; Ilitch family trust
- President of baseball operations: Scott Harris
- General managers: Jeff Greenberg
- Managers: A. J. Hinch
- Television: FanDuel Sports Network Detroit; Jason Benetti/Dan Dickerson (play-by-play); Andy Dirks/Dan Petry/Todd Jones/Carlos Peña (color commentary); Daniella Bruce (reporter); Johnny Kane (host)
- Radio: Detroit Tigers Radio Network; Dan Dickerson/Greg Gania (play-by-play); Bobby Scales/Dan Petry/Andy Dirks (color commentary)
- Stats: ESPN.com; Baseball Reference

The 2025 Detroit Tigers season was the team's 125th season and its 26th at Comerica Park. This was the Tigers' fifth season under manager A. J. Hinch. The Tigers improved their 86–76 record from the previous season by one win, and despite a strong first half that found them as much as 25 games over .500 (59–34 on July 8), the Tigers faltered severely in the second half, going 28–37 since the All-Star Game and only 7–17 in September. They gave up their division lead to the Cleveland Guardians, a team that was 15.5 games behind them in early July and 10.5 games back on August 31. Their collapse has been described as one of the worst in all of MLB history. Nevertheless, on September 27, the Tigers clinched a postseason berth for the second consecutive season with a 2–1 win over the Boston Red Sox. They finished with the same 87–75 record as the Houston Astros, but secured the last playoff spot by virtue of winning the head-to-head series.

The Tigers avenged last year's ALDS defeat to the Guardians by defeating them in the American League Wild Card Series, two games to one, and faced the second seed Seattle Mariners in the Division Series. Detroit repeated their 2024 ALDS performance, losing the series in five games. The fifth game extended to 15 innings, making it the longest winner-take-all game in MLB history.

The Detroit Tigers drew an average home attendance of 29,795.

== Roster moves ==
=== Trades ===
- On November 4, 2024, the Tigers traded pitcher Devin Sweet to the Philadelphia Phillies for cash considerations.
- On February 3, 2025, the Tigers traded pitcher Alex Faedo to the Tampa Bay Rays for minor league catcher Enderson Delgado.
- On February 12, 2025, the Tigers traded pitcher Mason Englert to the Tampa Bay Rays for minor league pitcher Drew Sommers.
- On March 13, 2025, the Tigers acquired pitcher Bailey Horn from the St. Louis Cardinals for cash considerations and sent him to triple-A Toledo Mud Hens. The Tigers had claimed Horn off waivers and then lost him to a waiver claim earlier in the offseason.
- On March 28, 2025, the Tigers acquired outfielder Brewer Hicklen from the Milwaukee Brewers for cash considerations and sent him to triple-A Toledo Mud Hens. He was called up on April 8, 2025. After being designated for assignment, Hicklen was traded to the Philadelphia Phillies for cash considerations on July 26.
- On July 28, 2025, the Tigers acquired pitchers Chris Paddack and Randy Dobnak from the Minnesota Twins for minor league catcher Enrique Jimenez.
- On July 31, 2025, the Tigers made the following transactions leading up to the MLB trade deadline. They acquired pitcher Rafael Montero from the Atlanta Braves for minor league infielder Jim Jarvis. They acquired pitcher Kyle Finnegan from the Washington Nationals for minor league pitchers Josh Randall and R.J. Sales, and pitcher Codi Heuer from the Texas Rangers for cash considerations. They acquired pitcher Paul Sewald from the Cleveland Guardians for future considerations. And just minutes before the deadline, they acquired pitcher Charlie Morton from the Baltimore Orioles for minor league pitcher Micah Ashman. The Tigers also traded pitchers Matt Manning to the Phillies for minor-league outfielder Josueth Quinonez and Dietrich Enns to the Baltimore Orioles for cash considerations after designating them for assignment earlier in the day.

=== Releases ===
- On November 6, 2024, minor league catchers Anthony Bemboom and Tomás Nido along with infielder Drew Maggi and outfielders Bligh Madris, Óscar Mercado and Ryan Vilade elected free agency.
- On November 6, 2024, minor league pitchers Miguel Díaz, Garrett Hill, Bryan Sammons and Andrew Vasquez elected free agency. Sammons and Vasquez signed with other leagues.
- On November 19, 2024, the Tigers designated minor league infielder Eddys Leonard and pitchers Ricky Vanasco and Brendan White for assignment. All three were not tendered a contract by the Tigers three days later but eventually resigned on minor league contracts.
- On November 22, 2024, the Tigers did not tender a contract to minor league pitcher Wilmer Flores. He later re-signed on a minor league contract.
- On December 3, 2024, Ryan Vilade signed a minor league contract with the St. Louis Cardinals.
- On December 10, 2024, the Tigers designated outfielder Akil Baddoo for assignment. He later cleared waivers and was outrighted to the triple-A Toledo Mud Hens.
- On December 27, 2024, the Tigers designated pitcher Bailey Horn for assignment. He was claimed off waivers by the St. Louis Cardinals on January 9, 2025.
- On December 28, 2024, pitcher Miguel Díaz signed a minor league contract with the San Francisco Giants.
- On January 29, 2025, the Tigers designated pitcher Alex Faedo for assignment. He was traded to the Rays five days later.
- On February 7, 2025, the Tigers designated pitcher Mason Englert for assignment. He was traded to the Rays five days later.
- On February 15, 2025, outfielder Óscar Mercado signed a minor league contract with the Philadelphia Phillies.
- On February 15, 2025, outfielder Garrett Hill signed a minor league contract with the Seattle Mariners.
- On February 16, 2025, pitcher Shelby Miller signed a minor league contract with the Arizona Diamondbacks. He had been released before the end of the 2024 season.
- On March 27, 2025, the Tigers released infielder Eddys Leonard from his minor league contract, He signed a minor league contract with the Atlanta Braves two days later.
- On April 23, 2025, the Tigers released outfielder David Hensley from his minor league contract. he signed with the Caliente de Durango of the Mexican League on May 2.
- On April 30, 2025, the Tigers released Andrew Chafin from his minor league contract. He signed with the Washington Nationals the next day.
- On May 1, 2025, the Tigers designated pitcher Kenta Meada for assignment. After being released on May 7, he signed a minor league contract with the Chicago Cubs on May 16.
- On May 20, 2025, the Tigers designated catcher Tomás Nido for assignment. He cleared waivers and was sent outright to Triple-A Toledo on May 23.
- On May 21, 2025, the Tigers released outfielder Ben Gamel from his minor league contract. He signed a minor league contract with the Los Angeles Angels on June 7.
- On June 2, 2025, the Tigers designated pitcher Ryan Cusick for assignment three days after claiming him off waivers from the Athletics. He was claimed off waivers by the Chicago White Sox on June 4, 2025.
- On June 6, 2025, the Tigers designated outfielder Akil Baddoo for assignment for a second time. Baddoo cleared waivers and accepted his outright assignment to Triple-A Toledo on June 10.
- On June 15, 2025, the Tigers designated pitcher John Brebbia for assignment. On June 25, he signed a minor league contract with the Atlanta Braves after the Tigers released him.
- On June 26, 2025, the Tigers designated pitcher Matt Gage for assignment. After electing free agency on July 1, Gage signed a minor league contract with the San Francisco Giants the next day.
- On July 8, 2025, the Tigers released outfielder Manuel Margot from his minor league contract.
- On July 21, 2025, the Tigers released pitcher Brendan White from his minor league contract.
- On July 23, 2025, the Tigers designated outfielder Brewer Hicklen for assignment. He was traded to the Phillies three days later.
- On July 24, 2025, the Tigers designated pitcher Carlos Hernández for assignment. He was claimed off waiver by the Cleveland Guardians on July 31.
- On July 26, 2025, the Tigers designated pitcher Geoff Hartlieb for assignment. He cleared waivers and was sent outright to Triple-A Toledo on July 30.
- On July 30, 2025, the Tigers designated pitcher Tyler Owens for assignment. He was released by the Tigers after clearing waivers on August 1. He was resigned on a minor league contract four days later.
- On July 31, 2025, the Tigers designated pitchers Matt Manning, Dietrich Enns, and PJ Poulin for assignment. Manning was traded to the Phillies and Enns to the Orioles later that day. Poulin was claimed off waivers by the Nationals on August 3.
- On August 8, 2025, the Tigers designated pitcher Luke Jackson for assignment. After clearing waivers, Jackson elected free agency. Jackson signed a minor league contract with the Seattle Mariners on August 21.
- On August 22, 2025, the Tigers designated outfielder Ryan Kreidler for assignment. He was claimed off waivers by the Pittsburgh Pirates two days later.
- On September 18, 2025, the Tigers released pitcher Codi Heuer and designated pitcher José Urquidy for assignment. Urquidy accepted a minor league option with the Tigers the next day.
- On September 21, 2025, the Tigers designated pitcher Charlie Morton for assignment.

=== Signings ===
- On November 9, 2024, the Tigers resigned infielder Bligh Madris to a minor league contract with an invitation to spring training.
- On November 17, 2024, the Tigers signed outfielder Jahmai Jones to a minor league contract with an invitation to spring training. His contract was selected by the Tigers on June 6, 2025.
- On November 19, 2024, the Tigers selected the contracts of pitchers Chase Lee, Tyler Mattison and Tyler Owens. Mattison was selected by the Tigers in the 4th round of the 2021 MLB draft, while Lee and Owens were acquired at the 2024 trade deadline in separate trades.
- On November 22, 2024, the Tigers claimed pitcher Bailey Horn off waivers from the Boston Red Sox. He was later designated for assignment.
- On November 26, 2024, the Tigers resigned pitcher Ricky Vanasco to a minor league contract.
- On December 5, 2024, the Tigers resigned infielder Eddys Leonard and pitcher Wilmer Flores to minor league contracts. Leonard was released before the start of the season.
- On December 10. 2024, the Tigers signed pitcher Alex Cobb to a one-year, $15 million contract.
- On December 12, 2024, the Tigers signed pitcher Ryan Miller to a minor league contract.
- On December 13, 2024, the Tigers signed catcher Brian Serven and resign pitcher Brendan White to minor league contracts.
- On December 21, 2024, the Tigers signed pitcher Matt Gage to a minor league contract. His contract was selected by the Tigers on June 12, 2025.
- On December 22, 2024, the Tigers signed pitcher Jordan Balazovic to a minor league contract.
- On December 27, 2024, the Tigers signed infielder Gleyber Torres to a one-year, $15 million contract.
- On January 6, 2025, the Tigers signed pitcher Dietrich Enns to a minor league contract. His contract was selected on June 26, 2025.
- On January 10, 2025, the Tigers resigned catcher Tomás Nido to a minor league contract with an invitation to spring training. His contract was selected by the Tigers on April 8, 2025.
- On January 29, 2025, the Tigers signed pitcher Tommy Kahnle to a one-year, $7.75 million contract.
- On February 7, 2025, the Tigers signed pitcher Jack Flaherty to a two-year, $35 million contract.
- On February 12, 2025, the Tigers signed pitcher John Brebbia to a one-year, $2.75 million contract with a second year option.
- On February 17, 2025, the Tigers signed outfielder David Hensley to a minor league contract with an invitation to spring training. He was released on April 23.
- On February 24, 2025, the Tigers signed pitcher Andrew Chafin to a minor league contract with an invitation to spring training. He was released on April 30.
- On March 8, 2025, the Tigers signed pitcher José Urquidy to a one-year, $1 million contract. He was placed on the 60-day IL while he continues to recover from Tommy John surgery.
- On March 24, 2025, the Tigers signed outfielder Manuel Margot to a one-year split contract worth $1.3 million in the major leagues and $200K minor leagues. He was released on July 8.
- On March 26, 2025, the Tigers signed outfielder Ben Gamel to a minor league contract. He was released on May 21.
- On April 29, 2025, the Tigers signed pitcher Nick Margevicius to a minor league contract.
- On May 14, 2025, infielder Gage Workman was returned to the Tigers from the Chicago White Sox after being claimed in the Rule 5 draft by the Chicago Cubs during the offseason.
- On May 30, 2025, the Tigers claimed pitcher Ryan Cusick off waivers from the Athletics and assigned him to triple-A Toledo Mud Hens. He was designated for assignment three days later.
- On June 16, 2025, the Tigers claimed pitcher Carlos Hernández off waivers from the Philadelphia Phillies.
- On July 6, 2025, the Tigers selected the contract of pitcher PJ Poulin to keep him in the organization after an upward mobility clause in his contract went into effect. Poulin was originally acquired from the Colorado Rockies in 2024 for cash considerations. He was designated for assignment on July 31.
- On July 8, 2025, the Tigers signed pitcher Devin Smeltzer to a minor league contract.
- On July 12, 2025, the Tigers signed pitcher Geoff Hartlieb to a minor league contract. His contract was selected on July 24.
- On July 18, 2025, the Tigers signed pitcher Tanner Rainey to a minor league contract. His contract was selected on September 21.
- On July 23, 2025, the Tigers selected the contract of pitcher Troy Melton. Melton was selected by the Tigers in the 4th round of the 2022 MLB draft,
- On July 26, 2025, the Tigers signed pitcher Luke Jackson to a major league contract.
- On August 5, 2025, the Tigers resigned pitcher Tyler Owens to a minor league contract four days after releasing him.
- On August 22, 2025, the Tigers selected the contract of pitcher Drew Sommers. The Tigers acquired Sommers in a trade with the Rays in February.
- On August 23, 2025, the Tigers signed infielder Kevin Newman to a minor league contract and assign him to Triple-A Toledo.

== Season accomplishments ==
- The Tigers were the first MLB team this season to reach 50 wins, which they accomplished on June 25 to run their record to 50–31.
- The 2025 Tigers had at least five players in an All-Star game for the first time since 2013. Riley Greene, Gleyber Torres and Javier Báez were voted in as starters, Tarik Skubal was named as a pitcher, and Zach McKinstry was added on July 9 as an injury replacement. Two days later, Casey Mize was added to the All-Star game roster as a replacement due to another pitcher's Saturday start, to give the Tigers six All-Stars, which ties a franchise high.
- On September 9 against the New York Yankees, the Tigers batted around the order in the seventh inning without recording an out, scoring eight runs (of an eventual nine runs in the inning). It's the first time they've scored eight runs before recording an out in an inning since June 1, 2013.
- On September 10 against the New York Yankees, the Tigers became the first visiting team ever to win back-to-back games by ten or more runs at Yankee Stadium.
- The 2025 Tigers had their first Gold Glove Award recipient since 2016 when Ian Kinsler won a Gold Glove. Catcher Dillon Dingler won the 2025 award becoming the first Tigers catcher to win it since 2007 and Ivan Rodriguez.

== Season standings ==
=== American League Central ===
AL Central
Team	W	L	Pct.	GB	Home	Road
Cleveland Guardians	88	74	.543	—	45‍–‍36	43‍–‍38
Detroit Tigers	87	75	.537	1	46‍–‍35	41‍–‍40
Kansas City Royals	82	80	.506	6	43‍–‍38	39‍–‍42
Minnesota Twins	70	92	.432	18	38‍–‍43	32‍–‍49
Chicago White Sox	60	102	.370	28	33‍–‍48	27‍–‍54

=== American League Wildcard ===
Division leaders
Team	W	L	Pct.
Toronto Blue Jays	94	68	.580
Seattle Mariners	90	72	.556
Cleveland Guardians	88	74	.543

Wild Card teams (Top 3 teams qualify for postseason)
Team	W	L	Pct.	GB
New York Yankees	94	68	.580	+7
Boston Red Sox	89	73	.549	+2
Detroit Tigers	87	75	.537	—
Houston Astros	87	75	.537	—
Kansas City Royals	82	80	.506	5
Texas Rangers	81	81	.500	6
Tampa Bay Rays	77	85	.475	10
Athletics	76	86	.469	11
Baltimore Orioles	75	87	.463	12
Los Angeles Angels	72	90	.444	15
Minnesota Twins	70	92	.432	17
Chicago White Sox	60	102	.370	27

=== Record vs. opponents ===
==== Record vs. American League ====
2025 American League record Source: MLB Standings Grid – 2025
Team	ATH	BAL	BOS	CWS	CLE	DET	HOU	KC	LAA	MIN	NYY	SEA	TB	TEX	TOR	NL
Athletics	—	4–2	3–3	5–1	2–4	4–2	8–5	4–2	4–9	4–3	2–4	6–7	3–3	5–8	2–5	20–28
Baltimore	2–4	—	5–8	6–0	3–4	1–5	3–4	2–4	5–1	0–6	4–9	5–1	7–6	2–4	6–7	24–24
Boston	3–3	8–5	—	4–3	4–2	2–4	4–2	4–2	1–5	3–3	9–4	3–3	10–3	3–4	5–8	26–22
Chicago	1–5	0–6	3–4	—	2–11	5–8	3–3	3–10	3–3	8–5	1–6	1–5	4–2	2–4	3–3	21–27
Cleveland	4–2	4–3	2–4	11–2	—	8–5	4–2	8–5	3–3	9–4	3–3	2–4	5–2	2–4	3–3	20–28
Detroit	2–4	5–1	4–2	8–5	5–8	—	4–2	9–4	5–2	8–5	4–2	2–4	3–3	2–4	3–4	23–25
Houston	5–8	4–3	2–4	3–3	2–4	2–4	—	3–3	8–5	5–1	3-3	5–8	3–4	7–6	4–2	31–17
Kansas City	2–4	4–2	2–4	10–3	5–8	4–9	3–3	—	3–3	7–6	0–6	3–4	3–3	6-1	4–2	26–22
Los Angeles	9–4	1–5	5–1	3–3	3–3	2–5	5–8	3–3	—	2–4	3–4	4–9	3–3	5–8	2–4	22–26
Minnesota	3–4	6–0	3–3	5–8	4–9	5–8	1–5	6–7	4–2	—	2–4	3–4	3–3	3–3	2–4	20–28
New York	4–2	9–4	4–9	6–1	3–3	2–4	3–3	6–0	4–3	4–2	—	5–1	9–4	4–2	5–8	26–22
Seattle	7–6	1–5	3–3	5–1	4–2	4–2	8–5	4–3	9–4	4–3	1–5	—	3–3	10–3	2–4	25–23
Tampa Bay	3–3	6–7	3–10	2–4	2–5	3–3	4–3	3–3	3–3	3–3	4–9	3–3	—	3–3	7–6	28–20
Texas	8–5	4–2	4–3	4–2	4–2	4–2	6–7	1-6	8–5	3–3	2–4	3–10	3–3	—	2–4	25–23
Toronto	5–2	7–6	8–5	3–3	3–3	4–3	2–4	2–4	4–2	4–2	8–5	4–2	6–7	4–2	—	30–18

Updated with the results of all games through September 28, 2025.

==== Record vs. National League ====
2025 American League record vs. National League Source: MLB Standings
Team	AZ	ATL	CHC	CIN	COL	LAD	MIA	MIL	NYM	PHI	PIT	SD	SF	STL	WSH
Athletics	1–2	2–1	0–3	3–0	2–1	1–2	2–1	1–2	1–2	1–2	1–2	1–2	1–5	1–2	2–1
Baltimore	1–2	3–0	1–2	1–2	2–1	2–1	1–2	1–2	2–1	1–2	3–0	3–0	1–2	1–2	1–5
Boston	1–2	3–3	1–2	2–1	3–0	2–1	2–1	0–3	2–1	1–2	1–2	1–2	1–2	3–0	3–0
Chicago	1–2	1–2	1–5	2–1	2–1	0–3	2–1	1–2	1–2	2–1	3–0	1–2	2–1	0–3	2–1
Cleveland	1–2	0–3	0–3	1–5	2–1	1–2	2–1	2–1	3–0	1–2	3–0	0–3	2–1	0–3	2–1
Detroit	3–0	0–3	2–1	1–2	3–0	0–3	1–2	1–2	1–2	1–2	2–4	2–1	3–0	2–1	1–2
Houston	3–0	2–1	2–1	2–1	4–2	3–0	2–1	1–2	2–1	3–0	2–1	2–1	0–3	1–2	2–1
Kansas City	2–1	2–1	2–1	1–2	3–0	1–2	1–2	1–2	1–2	1–2	3–0	1–2	2–1	3–3	2–1
Los Angeles	2–1	2–1	0–3	1–2	1–2	6–0	1–2	0–3	0–3	2–1	1–2	1–2	2–1	2–1	1–2
Minnesota	1–2	0–3	2–1	1–2	1–2	1–2	1–2	2–4	2–1	1–2	2–1	2–1	3–0	0–3	1–2
New York	1–2	2–1	1–2	1–2	2–1	1–2	0–3	3–0	3–3	1–2	2–1	2–1	1–2	3–0	3–0
Seattle	0–3	2–1	2–1	2–1	3–0	0–3	2–1	1–2	1–2	0–3	3–0	5–1	0–3	3–0	1–2
Tampa Bay	2–1	2–1	1–2	0–3	2–1	1–2	3–3	2–1	3–0	0–3	2–1	3–0	2–1	2–1	3–0
Texas	2–4	3–0	1–2	2–1	3–0	1–2	0–3	3–0	2–1	0–3	2–1	1–2	1–2	2–1	2–1
Toronto	2–1	2–1	2–1	2–1	3–0	1–2	2–1	1–2	0–3	2–4	1–2	3–0	3–0	3–0	3–0

Updated with the results of all games through September 28, 2025.

== Game log ==
=== Regular season ===
2025 Game Log: 87–75 (Home 46–35, Road 41–40)
March/April: 19–12 (Home 13–3, Road 6–9)

#	Date	Opponent	Score	Win	Loss	Save	Attendance	Record	Streak
1	March 27	@ Dodgers	4–5	Snell (1–0)	**Skubal** (0–1)	Treinen (1)	53,595	0–1	L1
2	March 28	@ Dodgers	5–8 (10)	García (1–0)	**Brieske** (0–1)	—	52,029	0–2	L2
3	March 29	@ Dodgers	3–7	Banda (1–0)	**Olson** (0–1)	—	51,788	0–3	L3
4	March 31	@ Mariners	9–6	**Holton** (1–0)	Hancock (0–1)	**Hurter** (1)	15,306	1–3	W1
5	April 1	@ Mariners	4–1	**Mize** (1–0)	Gilbert (0–1)	**Kahnle** (1)	17,333	2–3	W2
6	April 2	@ Mariners	2–3	Castillo (1–1)	**Skubal** (0–2)	Muñoz (3)	15,560	2–4	L1
7	April 4	White Sox	7–4	**Flaherty** (1–0)	Cannon (0–1)	—	44,735	3–4	W1
8	April 5	White Sox	7–2	**Olson** (1–1)	Martin (0–1)	—	26,098	4–4	W2
9	April 6	White Sox	4–3	**Brebbia** (1–0)	Ellard (0–1)	—	20,981	5–4	W3
10	April 7	Yankees	6–2	**Mize** (2–0)	Rodón (1–2)	—	14,132	6–4	W4
11	April 8	Yankees	5–0	**Skubal** (1–2)	Carrasco (1–1)	**Hurter** (2)	14,156	7–4	W5
12	April 9	Yankees	3–4	Fried (2–0)	**Holton** (1–1)	Leiter Jr. (1)	14,616	7–5	L1
13	April 11	@ Twins	7–6	**Vest** (1–0)	Alcalá (0–2)	**Kahnle** (2)	12,900	8–5	W1
14	April 12	@ Twins	4–0	**Jobe** (1–0)	Paddack (0–2)	—	23,391	9–5	W2
15	April 13	@ Twins	1–5	Woods Richardson (1–1)	**Mize** (2–1)	—	15,693	9–6	L1
16	April 14	@ Brewers	9–1	**Skubal** (2–2)	Alexander (1–1)	—	20,892	10–6	W1
17	April 15	@ Brewers	0–5	Priester (1–0)	**Flaherty** (1–1)	—	18,396	10–7	L1
18	April 16	@ Brewers	1–5	Quintana (2–0)	**K. Montero** (0–1)	—	22,360	10–8	L2
19	April 17	Royals	6–1	**Olson** (2–1)	Lorenzen (1–3)	**Kahnle** (3)	15,769	11–8	W1
20	April 18	Royals	7–3	**Jobe** (2–0)	Ragans (1–1)	**Kahnle** (4)	25,754	12–8	W2
21	April 19	Royals	3–1	**Mize** (3–1)	Lugo (1–3)	**Vest** (1)	32,043	13–8	W3
22	April 20	Royals	3–4 (10)	Estévez (1–0)	**Holton** (1–2)	—	17,712	13–9	L1
23	April 21	Padres	6–4	**Hanifee** (1–0)	Vásquez (1–2)	**Vest** (2)	17,581	14–9	W1
24	April 22	Padres	0–2	Pivetta (4–1)	**Flaherty** (1–2)	Suárez (10)	19,321	14–10	L1
25	April 23	Padres	6–0	**Olson** (3–1)	Hart (2–2)	—	21,016	15–10	W1
―	April 25	Orioles	Postponed (inclement weather). Rescheduled to April 26.						
26	April 26 (1)	Orioles	4–3	**Mize** (4–1)	Young (0–1)	**Vest** (3)	28,509	16–10	W2
27	April 26 (2)	Orioles	6–2	**Hurter** (1–0)	Morton (0–6)	—	21,422	17–10	W3
28	April 27	Orioles	7–0	**Skubal** (3–2)	Kremer (2–4)	—	28,613	18–10	W4
29	April 28	@ Astros	5–8	Okert (1–0)	**Flaherty** (1–3)	Hader (8)	26,395	18–11	L1
30	April 29	@ Astros	4–6	Sousa (1–0)	**Olson** (3–2)	—	28,904	18–12	L2
31	April 30	@ Astros	7–4	**Hanifee** (2–0)	Blubaugh (0–1)	**Kahnle** (5)	27,568	19–12	W1

May: 19–9 (Home: 8–5; Away: 11–4)

#	Date	Opponent	Score	Win	Loss	Save	Attendance	Record	Streak
32	May 1	@ Angels	10–4	**Mize** (5–1)	Detmers (0–2)	—	28,486	20–12	W2
33	May 2	@ Angels	9–1	**Holton** (2–2)	Jansen (0–1)	—	29,870	21–12	W3
34	May 3	@ Angels	2–5	Hendricks (1–3)	**Flaherty** (1–4)	Jansen (7)	31,335	21–13	L1
35	May 4	@ Angels	13–1	**Olson** (4–2)	Kochanowicz (1–5)	—	37,554	22–13	W1
―	May 6	@ Rockies	Postponed (inclement weather). Rescheduled to May 8.						
36	May 7	@ Rockies	8–6 (10)	**Vest** (2–0)	Agnos (0–1)	—	18,855	23–13	W2
37	May 8 (1)	@ Rockies	10–2	**Mize** (6–1)	Freeland (0–5)	—	23,030	24–13	W3
38	May 8 (2)	@ Rockies	11–1	**K. Montero** (1–1)	Gordon (0–1)	—	23,030	25–13	W4
39	May 9	Rangers	2–1	**Skubal** (4–2)	Corbin (2–2)	**Vest** (4)	28,407	26–13	W5
40	May 10	Rangers	3–10	deGrom (3–1)	**Flaherty** (1–5)	—	40,844	26–14	L1
41	May 11	Rangers	1–6	Eovaldi (4–2)	**Olson** (4–3)	—	36,138	26–15	L2
42	May 12	Red Sox	14–2	**Jobe** (3–0)	Houck (0–3)	—	20,136	27–15	W1
43	May 13	Red Sox	10–9 (11)	**Brieske** (1–1)	Weissert (1–1)	—	20,115	28–15	W2
44	May 14	Red Sox	6–5	**Vest** (3–0)	Chapman (2–2)	—	21,013	29–15	W3
45	May 16	@ Blue Jays	5–4	**Flaherty** (2–5)	Francis (2–6)	**Brieske** (1)	23,146	30–15	W4
46	May 17	@ Blue Jays	1–2	Hoffman (4–2)	**Hanifee** (2–1)	—	40,171	30–16	L1
47	May 18	@ Blue Jays	3–2	**Jobe** (4–0)	Fluharty (3–1)	**Vest** (5)	36,064	31–16	W1
48	May 19	@ Cardinals	4–11	Gray (5–1)	**Guenther** (0–1)	—	24,817	31–17	L1
49	May 20	@ Cardinals	5–4	**Vest** (4–0)	Leahy (1–1)	**Kahnle** (6)	31,766	32–17	W1
50	May 21	@ Cardinals	5–1	**Lee** (1–0)	Pallante (4–3)	—	28,990	33–17	W2
51	May 22	Guardians	0–7	Bibee (4–4)	**Flaherty** (2–6)	—	21,937	33–18	L1
52	May 23	Guardians	1–3	Cecconi (1–1)	**Jobe** (4–1)	Clase (10)	26,701	33–19	L2
53	May 24	Guardians	5–7 (10)	Herrin (4–1)	**Hanifee** (2–2)	—	37,256	33–20	L3
54	May 25	Guardians	5–0	**Skubal** (5–2)	Allen (2–5)	—	37,031	34–20	W1
55	May 26	Giants	3–1	**K. Montero** (2–1)	Birdsong (2–1)	**Vest** (6)	31,640	35–20	W2
56	May 27	Giants	3–1	**Flaherty** (3–6)	Webb (5–5)	**Vest** (7)	21,092	36–20	W3
57	May 28	Giants	4–3	**Hanifee** (3–2)	Roupp (3–4)	**Kahnle** (7)	31,602	37–20	W4
58	May 30	@ Royals	7–5	**Hurter** (1–0)	Lugo (3–5)	**Vest** (8)	28,875	38–20	W5
59	May 31	@ Royals	0–1	Schreiber (2–2)	**Brieske** (1–2)	Estévez (16)	35,005	38–21	L1

June: 15–11 (Home: 9–6; Away: 6–5)

#	Date	Opponent	Score	Win	Loss	Save	Attendance	Record	Streak
60	June 1	@ Royals	1–0	**Lee** (2–0)	Bubic (5–3)	**Vest** (9)	24,474	39–21	W1
61	June 2	@ White Sox	13–1	**Flaherty** (4–6)	Cannon (2–7)	—	11,852	40–21	W2
62	June 3	@ White Sox	1–8	Smith (2–3)	**Hurter** (2–1)	—	12,308	40–22	L1
63	June 4	@ White Sox	5–4	**Vest** (5–0)	Eisert (2–1)	**Kahnle** (8)	12,381	41–22	W1
64	June 5	@ White Sox	2–3 (10)	Wilson (2–1)	**Brieske** (1–3)	—	11,630	41–23	L1
65	June 6	Cubs	3–1	**Skubal** (6–2)	Brown (3–4)	**Vest** (10)	40,132	42–23	W1
66	June 7	Cubs	1–6	Taillon (6–3)	**Holton** (2–3)	—	41,034	42–24	L1
67	June 8	Cubs	4–0	**Flaherty** (5–6)	Horton (3–1)	—	40,343	43–24	W1
68	June 10	@ Orioles	5–3	**Lee** (3–0)	Povich (1–5)	**Vest** (11)	20,291	44–24	W2
69	June 11	@ Orioles	1–10	Eflin (6–2)	**Mize** (6–2)	—	18,630	44–25	L1
70	June 12	@ Orioles	4–1	**Skubal** (7–2)	Kremer (5–7)	**Vest** (12)	18,800	45–25	W1
71	June 13	Reds	11–5	**K. Montero** (3–1)	Martinez (4–7)	—	40,413	46–25	W2
72	June 14	Reds	1–11	Singer (7–4)	**Flaherty** (5–7)	—	30,199	46–26	L1
73	June 15	Reds	4–8	Ashcraft (5–4)	**Vest** (5–1)	—	40,418	46–27	L2
74	June 17	Pirates	7–3	**Mize** (7–2)	Mlodzinski (1–5)	—	27,449	47–27	W1
―	June 18	Pirates	Postponed (inclement weather). Rescheduled to June 19.						
75	June 19 (1)	Pirates	9–2	**Skubal** (8–2)	Heaney (3–6)	—	33,368	48–27	W2
76	June 19 (2)	Pirates	4–8	Bednar (2–5)	**Hurter** (2–2)	—	28,540	48–28	L1
77	June 20	@ Rays	8–14	Baz (7–3)	**Flaherty** (5–8)	—	10,046	48–29	L2
78	June 21	@ Rays	3–8	Pepiot (5–6)	**Hurter** (2–3)	—	10,046	48–30	L3
79	June 22	@ Rays	9–3	**Holton** (3–3)	Cleavinger (0–3)	—	10,046	49–30	W1
80	June 24	Athletics	11–4	**Skubal** (9–2)	Severino (2–8)	—	22,929	50–30	W2
81	June 25	Athletics	0–3	Lopez (2–4)	**Flaherty** (5–9)	Miller (15)	21,872	50–31	L1
82	June 26	Athletics	8–0	**Enns** (1–0)	Springs (6–6)	—	27,676	51–31	W1
83	June 27	Twins	1–4	Festa (2–2)	**Gipson-Long** (0–1)	Durán (12)	32,120	51–32	L1
84	June 28	Twins	10–5	**Mize** (8–2)	Ober (4–6)	—	33,780	52–32	W1
85	June 29	Twins	3–0	**Skubal** (10–2)	Paddack (3–7)	**Vest** (13)	40,718	53–32	W2

July: 11–14 (Home: 6–7; Away: 5–7)

#	Date	Opponent	Score	Win	Loss	Save	Attendance	Record	Streak
―	July 1	@ Nationals	Postponed (inclement weather). Rescheduled to July 2.						
86	July 2 (1)	@ Nationals	11–2	**Smith** (1–0)	Williams (3–10)	—	13,994	54–32	W3
87	July 2 (2)	@ Nationals	4–9	Henry (1–1)	**Kahnle** (0–1)	—	16,095	54–33	L1
88	July 3	@ Nationals	7–11	Irvin (7–3)	**Enns** (1–1)	—	31,599	54–34	L2
89	July 4	@ Guardians	2–1	**Holton** (4–3)	Cecconi (3–4)	**Vest** (14)	38,213	55–34	W1
90	July 5	@ Guardians	1–0	**Mize** (9–2)	Allen (5–7)	**Kahnle** (9)	34,580	56–34	W2
91	July 6	@ Guardians	7–2 (10)	**Lee** (4–0)	Smith (2–3)	—	30,953	57–34	W3
92	July 7	Rays	5–1	**K. Montero** (4–1)	Baz (8–4)	—	22,657	58–34	W4
93	July 8	Rays	4–2	**Kahnle** (1–1)	Uceta (5–2)	**Vest** (15)	25,198	59–34	W5
94	July 9	Rays	3–7	Littell (8–7)	**Lee** (4–1)	—	22,019	59–35	L1
95	July 11	Mariners	3–12	Castillo (6–5)	**Skubal** (10–3)	—	41,681	59–36	L2
96	July 12	Mariners	7–15	Kirby (4–4)	**Mize** (9–3)	—	36,438	59–37	L3
97	July 13	Mariners	4–8	Brash (1–0)	**Kahnle** (1–2)	—	34,671	59–38	L4
**95th All-Star Game in Cumberland, GA**
98	July 18	@ Rangers	0–2	Martin (1–5)	**Kahnle** (1–3)	Garcia (7)	36,068	59–39	L5
99	July 19	@ Rangers	1–4	Rocker (4–4)	**K. Montero** (4–2)	—	37,045	59–40	L6
100	July 20	@ Rangers	2–1	**Holton** (5–3)	Martin (1–6)	**Vest** (16)	33,209	60–40	W1
101	July 21	@ Pirates	0–3	Skenes (5–9)	**Flaherty** (5–10)	Bednar (14)	19,379	60–41	L1
102	July 22	@ Pirates	5–8	Keller (4–10)	**Mize** (9–4)	Bednar (15)	17,257	60–42	L2
103	July 23	@ Pirates	1–6	Falter (7–5)	**Melton** (0–1)	—	17,248	60–43	L3
104	July 24	Blue Jays	4–11	Lauer (6–2)	**Olson** (4–4)	—	30,051	60–44	L4
105	July 25	Blue Jays	2–6	Berríos (7–4)	**K. Montero** (4–3)	—	37,820	60–45	L5
106	July 26	Blue Jays	1–6	Fisher (4–0)	**Vest** (5–2)	—	40,528	60–46	L6
107	July 27	Blue Jays	10–4	**Flaherty** (6–10)	Scherzer (1–1)	—	36,053	61–46	W1
108	July 28	Diamondbacks	5–1	**Melton** (1–1)	Rodríguez (3–7)	—	23,124	62–46	W2
109	July 29	Diamondbacks	12–2	**Hurter** (3–3)	Pfaadt (10–7)	—	27,697	63–46	W3
110	July 30	Diamondbacks	7–2	**Paddack** (4–9)	Nelson (6–3)	—	29,033	64–46	W4

August: 16–12 (Home: 8–4; Away: 8–8)

#	Date	Opponent	Score	Win	Loss	Save	Attendance	Record	Streak
111	August 1	@ Phillies	4–5	Kerkering (6–4)	**Hanifee** (3–3)	Durán (17)	43,421	64–47	L1
112	August 2	@ Phillies	7–5	**Skubal** (11–3)	Wheeler (9–5)	**Finnegan** (21)	44,689	65–47	W1
113	August 3	@ Phillies	0–2	Sánchez (10–3)	**Morton** (7–9)	Durán (18)	41,569	65–48	L1
114	August 4	Twins	6–3	**Mize** (10–4)	Davis (0–2)	**Finnegan** (22)	24,018	66–48	W1
115	August 5	Twins	3–6	Matthews (3–3)	**Paddack** (4–10)	Topa (1)	26,313	66–49	L1
116	August 6	Twins	4–9	Hatch (1–0)	**Flaherty** (6–11)	—	29,192	66–50	L2
117	August 8	Angels	6–5	**Melton** (2–1)	Detmers (3–3)	**Finnegan** (23)	35,290	67–50	W1
118	August 9	Angels	4–7	Kikuchi (6–7)	**Morton** (7–10)	Jansen (21)	37,741	67–51	L1
119	August 10	Angels	9–5	**Mize** (11–4)	Kochanowicz (3–10)	—	30,810	68–51	W1
120	August 11	@ White Sox	2–1	**Finnegan** (2–4)	Eisert (2–4)	**Vest** (17)	16,054	69–51	W2
121	August 12	@ White Sox	6–9	Gómez (2–1)	**Flaherty** (6–12)	Leasure (4)	19,494	69–52	L1
122	August 13	@ White Sox	1–0	**Melton** (3–1)	Pérez (1–2)	**Vest** (18)	13,647	70–52	W1
123	August 14	@ Twins	4–3 (11)	**R. Montero** (1–1)	Ramírez (0–1)	—	24,123	71–52	W2
124	August 15	@ Twins	7–0	**Morton** (8–10)	Ohl (0–3)	—	27,282	72–52	W3
125	August 16	@ Twins	8–5	**Mize** (12–4)	Kriske (0–1)	**Finnegan** (24)	19,537	73–52	W4
126	August 17	@ Twins	1–8	Hatch (2–0)	**Paddack** (4–11)	—	22,230	73–53	L1
127	August 18	Astros	10–0	**Flaherty** (7–12)	Arrighetti (1–4)	—	27,008	74–53	W1
128	August 19	Astros	1–0 (10)	**Vest** (6–2)	Ort (2–2)	—	30,770	75–53	W2
129	August 20	Astros	7–2	**Morton** (9–10)	Valdez (11–7)	—	29,216	76–53	W3
130	August 22	Royals	7–5	**Finnegan** (3–4)	Falter (7-7)	—	33,467	77–53	W4
131	August 23	Royals	4–2	**Paddack** (5–11)	Wacha (8–10)	**Vest** (19)	37,709	78–53	W5
132	August 24	Royals	8–10	Schreiber (3–2)	**Flaherty** (7–13)	Estévez (34)	31,538	78–54	L1
133	August 25	@ Athletics	3–8	Kelly (4–2)	**Skubal** (11–4)	—	8,105	78–55	L2
134	August 26	@ Athletics	6–7 (10)	Núñez (1–0)	**Vest** (6–3)	—	9,043	78–56	L3
135	August 27	@ Athletics	0–7	Morales (2–0)	**Mize** (12–5)	—	8,551	78–57	L4
136	August 29	@ Royals	5–3	**Finnegan** (4–4)	Lugo (8–7)	**Vest** (20)	34,494	79–57	W1
137	August 30	@ Royals	1–3	Erceg (6–3)	**Holton** (5–4)	Estévez (36)	26,237	79–58	L1
138	August 31	@ Royals	5–0	**Skubal** (12–4)	Wacha (8–11)	—	23,689	80–58	W1

September: 7–17 (Home: 2–10; Away: 5–7)

#	Date	Opponent	Score	Win	Loss	Save	Attendance	Record	Streak
139	September 1	Mets	8–10	Stanek (3–6)	**Sommers** (0–1)	Díaz (25)	38,912	80–59	L1
140	September 2	Mets	5–12	McLean (4–0)	**Gipson-Long** (0–2)	—	24,733	80–60	L2
141	September 3	Mets	6–2	**Mize** (13–5)	Holmes (11–7)	—	21,775	81–60	W1
142	September 5	White Sox	5–7	Smith (5–7)	**Horn** (0–1)	Leasure (7)	35,216	81–61	L1
143	September 6	White Sox	6–0	**Skubal** (13–4)	Pérez (1–4)	—	32,115	82–61	W1
144	September 7	White Sox	4–6	Taylor (2–4)	**Kahnle** (1–4)	Vasil (4)	29,292	82–62	L1
145	September 9	@ Yankees	12–2	**Mize** (14–5)	Cruz (2–4)	**Paddack** (1)	35,653	83–62	W1
146	September 10	@ Yankees	11–1	**Flaherty** (8–13)	Rodón (16–8)	—	36,727	84–62	W2
147	September 11	@ Yankees	3–9	Schlittler (3–3)	**Holton** (5–5)	Yarbrough (1)	40,608	84–63	L1
148	September 12	@ Marlins	2–8	Alcántara (9–12)	**Skubal** (13–5)	—	16,926	84–64	L2
149	September 13	@ Marlins	4–6 (11)	Simpson (3–2)	**R. Montero** (1–2)	—	21,014	84–65	L3
150	September 14	@ Marlins	2–0	**K. Montero** (5–3)	Mazur (0–4)	**Vest** (21)	24,638	85–65	W1
151	September 16	Guardians	5–7 (10)	Smith (7–5)	**Vest** (6–4)	—	31,639	85–66	L1
152	September 17	Guardians	0–4	Williams (11–5)	**Flaherty** (8–14)	—	34,415	85–67	L2
153	September 18	Guardians	1–3	Bibee (11–11)	**Melton** (3–2)	Gaddis (3)	34,267	85–68	L3
154	September 19	Braves	1–10	Elder (8–10)	**Morton** (9–11)	—	33,554	85–69	L4
155	September 20	Braves	5–6	Dodd (1–0)	**Vest** (6–5)	Iglesias (27)	38,079	85–70	L5
156	September 21	Braves	2–6	Strider (7–13)	**Mize** (14–6)	—	34,042	85–71	L6
157	September 23	@ Guardians	2–5	Williams (12–5)	**Skubal** (13–6)	Smith (16)	29,571	85–72	L7
158	September 24	@ Guardians	1–5	Bibee (12–11)	**Flaherty** (8–15)	—	26,293	85–73	L8
159	September 25	@ Guardians	4–2	**Hurter** (4–3)	Messick (3–1)	**Vest** (22)	30,942	86–73	W1
160	September 26	@ Red Sox	3–4	Chapman (5–3)	**Kahnle** (1–5)	—	37,052	86–74	L1
161	September 27	@ Red Sox	2–1	**Holton** (6–5)	Early (1–2)	**Vest** (23)	36,478	87–74	W1
162	September 28	@ Red Sox	3–4	De León (1–0)	**Paddack** (5–12)	Weissert (4)	35,503	87–75	L1

Legend: = Win = Loss = Clinched playoff spot = Postponement
Bold = Tigers team member

=== Postseason ===
2025 Postseason Game Log: 4–4 (Home 1–1, Road 3–3)
AL Wild Card Series: 2–1 (Home 0–0, Road 2–1)

#	Date	Opponent	Score	Win	Loss	Save	Attendance	Record
1	September 30	@ Guardians	2–1	**Skubal** (1–0)	Williams (0–1)	**Vest** (1)	26,186	1–0
2	October 1	@ Guardians	1–6	Smith (1–0)	**Melton** (0–1)	—	26,669	1–1
3	October 2	@ Guardians	6–3	**Finnegan** (1–0)	Cantillo (0–1)	—	29,891	2–1

AL Division Series: 2–3 (Home 1–1, Road 1–2)

#	Date	Opponent	Score	Win	Loss	Save	Attendance	Record
1	October 4	@ Mariners	3–2 (11)	**Vest** (1–0)	Vargas (0–1)	**K. Montero** (1)	47,290	1–0
2	October 5	@ Mariners	2–3	Brash (1–0)	**Finnegan** (0–1)	Muñoz (1)	47,731	1–1
3	October 7	Mariners	4–8	Gilbert (1–0)	**Flaherty** (0–1)	–	41,525	1–2
4	October 8	Mariners	9–3	**Melton** (1–1)	Speier (0–1)	–	37,069	2–2
5	October 10	@ Mariners	2–3 (15)	Castillo (1–0)	**Kahnle** (0–1)	—	47,025	2–3

==== Postseason rosters ====
Playoff rosters
American League Wild Card Series

- Pitchers: 9 Jack Flaherty 12 Casey Mize 19 Will Vest 29 Tarik Skubal 43 Tommy Kahnle 48 Brant Hurter 52 Troy Melton 54 Keider Montero 62 Paul Sewald 64 Kyle Finnegan 87 Tyler Holton 99 Rafael Montero
- Catchers: 13 Dillon Dingler 34 Jake Rogers
- Infielders: 20 Spencer Torkelson 25 Gleyber Torres 27 Trey Sweeney 28 Javier Báez 77 Andy Ibáñez
- Outfielders: 18 Jahmai Jones 22 Parker Meadows 30 Kerry Carpenter 31 Riley Greene 39 Zach McKinstry 44 Justyn-Henry Malloy 46 Wenceel Pérez

American League Division Series

- Pitchers: 9 Jack Flaherty 12 Casey Mize 19 Will Vest 29 Tarik Skubal 43 Tommy Kahnle 48 Brant Hurter 52 Troy Melton 54 Keider Montero 64 Kyle Finnegan 75 Brenan Hanifee 87 Tyler Holton 99 Rafael Montero
- Catchers: 13 Dillon Dingler 34 Jake Rogers
- Infielders: 20 Spencer Torkelson 25 Gleyber Torres 27 Trey Sweeney 28 Javier Báez 33 Colt Keith 77 Andy Ibáñez
- Outfielders: 18 Jahmai Jones 22 Parker Meadows 30 Kerry Carpenter 31 Riley Greene 39 Zach McKinstry 46 Wenceel Pérez

== Roster ==
2025 Detroit Tigers
Roster
Pitchers: 49 John Brebbia; 4 Beau Brieske; 51 Dietrich Enns; 64 Kyle Finnegan; 9 Jack Flaherty; 99 Matt Gage; 66 Sawyer Gipson-Long; 73 Sean Guenther; 75 Brenan Hanifee; 64 Geoff Hartlieb; 49 Carlos Hernández; 57 Codi Heuer; 87 Tyler Holton; 67 Bailey Horn; 48 Brant Hurter; 49 Luke Jackson; 21 Jackson Jobe; 43 Tommy Kahnle; 55 Alex Lange; 53 Chase Lee; 18 Kenta Maeda; 52 Troy Melton; 12 Casey Mize; 54 Keider Montero; 99 Rafael Montero; 50 Charlie Morton; 45 Reese Olson; 62 Tyler Owens; 40 Chris Paddack; 32 Tanner Rainey; 62 Paul Sewald; 29 Tarik Skubal; 58 Dylan Smith; 51 Drew Sommers; 65 José Urquidy; 19 Will Vest	Catchers: 13 Dillon Dingler; 0,58 Tomás Nido; 34 Jake Rogers; Infielders: 28 Javier Báez; 77 Andy Ibáñez; 17 Jace Jung; 33 Colt Keith; 39 Zach McKinstry; 27 Trey Sweeney; 20 Spencer Torkelson; 25 Gleyber Torres	Outfielders: 60 Akil Baddoo; 30 Kerry Carpenter; 31 Riley Greene; 50 Brewer Hicklen; 18 Jahmai Jones; 32 Ryan Kreidler; 44 Justyn-Henry Malloy; 7 Manuel Margot; 22 Parker Meadows; 46 Wenceel Pérez; 8 Matt Vierling	Manager: 14 A. J. Hinch; Coaches: 37 Keith Beauregard (hitting); 90 Michael Brdar (hitting); 98 Chris Chinea (bullpen catcher); 56 Joey Cora (third base); 41 Chris Fetter (pitching); 76 Anthony Iapoce (first base); 86 Gary Jones (major league coach); 26 George Lombard (bench); 63 Robin Lund (assistant pitching); 61 Juan Nieves (assistant pitching); 97 Tim Remes (bullpen catcher); 83 Ryan Sienko (catching); 91 Lance Zawadzki (assistant hitting)

== Player stats ==
= Indicates team leader

= Indicates league leader

=== Batting ===
Note: G = Games played; AB = At bats; R = Runs scored; H = Hits; 2B = Doubles; 3B = Triples; HR = Home runs; RBI = Runs batted in; SB = Stolen bases; BB = Walks; AVG = Batting average; SLG = Slugging average

Player	G	AB	R	H	2B	3B	HR	RBI	SB	BB	AVG	SLG
Riley Greene	157	600	84	155	31	1	36	111	2	46	.258	.493
Spencer Torkelson	155	563	82	135	27	1	31	78	2	72	.240	.456
Gleyber Torres	145	532	79	136	22	0	16	74	4	85	.256	.387
Zach McKinstry	144	452	68	117	23	11	12	49	19	46	.259	.438
Dillon Dingler	126	435	54	121	21	2	13	57	0	23	.278	.425
Kerry Carpenter	130	433	66	109	18	5	26	62	1	18	.252	.497
Javier Báez	126	417	55	107	17	3	12	57	5	10	.257	.398
Colt Keith	137	414	65	106	22	2	13	45	1	48	.256	.413
Wenceel Pérez	100	344	47	84	17	4	13	43	8	31	.244	.430
Trey Sweeney	118	296	36	58	6	2	6	32	3	26	.196	.291
Parker Meadows	58	191	22	41	6	2	4	16	4	21	.215	.330
Andy Ibáñez	91	176	24	42	8	0	4	21	4	12	.239	.352
Jahmai Jones	72	129	21	37	11	1	7	23	2	18	.287	.333
Jake Rogers	46	123	14	23	5	2	3	19	0	15	.187	.333
Justyn-Henry Malloy	52	104	15	23	6	0	1	17	0	20	.221	.308
Matt Vierling	31	88	6	21	3	0	1	11	2	7	.239	.307
Jace Jung	21	47	8	5	0	0	0	3	0	7	.106	.106
Ryan Kreidler	17	38	5	4	0	0	0	0	2	4	.105	.105
Tomás Nido	10	35	4	12	0	0	0	2	0	0	.343	.343
Manuel Margot	6	19	1	6	0	0	0	3	0	0	.316	.316
Akil Baddoo	7	17	0	2	1	0	0	1	1	1	.118	.176
Brewer Hicklen	1	3	2	2	0	0	0	0	1	1	.667	.667
Totals	162	5456	758	1346	244	36	198	724	61	511	.247	.413

Source:Baseball Reference

=== Pitching ===
Note: W = Wins; L = Losses; ERA = Earned run average; G = Games pitched; GS = Games started; SV = Saves; IP = Innings pitched; H = Hits allowed; R = Runs allowed; ER = Earned runs allowed; BB = Walks allowed; SO = Strikeouts

Player	W	L	ERA	G	GS	SV	IP	H	R	ER	BB	SO
Tarik Skubal	13	6	2.21	31	31	0	195.1	141	55	48	33	241
Jack Flaherty	8	15	4.64	31	31	0	161.0	147	85	83	59	188
Casey Mize	14	6	3.87	28	28	0	149.0	153	68	64	36	139
Keider Montero	5	3	4.37	20	12	0	90.2	95	46	44	31	72
Tyler Holton	6	5	3.66	70	6	0	78.2	65	34	32	17	64
Will Vest	6	5	3.01	64	0	23	68.2	61	26	23	22	75
Reese Olson	4	4	3.15	13	13	0	68.2	58	24	24	25	65
Brant Hurter	4	3	2.43	43	4	2	63.0	57	26	17	27	68
Tommy Kahnle	1	5	4.43	66	0	9	63.0	51	32	31	31	50
Brenan Hanifee	3	3	3.00	54	0	0	60.0	65	31	20	14	40
Jackson Jobe	4	1	4.22	10	10	0	49.0	46	24	23	27	39
Chris Paddack	2	3	6.32	12	7	1	47.0	51	33	33	10	29
Troy Melton	3	2	2.76	16	4	0	45.2	31	15	14	15	36
Charlie Morton	2	2	7.09	9	9	0	39.1	40	31	31	23	47
Chase Lee	4	1	4.10	32	0	0	37.1	32	17	17	9	36
Sawyer Gipson-Long	0	2	7.18	8	3	0	31.1	34	26	25	6	26
Beau Brieske	1	3	6.55	22	1	1	22.0	24	20	16	12	16
Rafael Montero	1	1	2.86	20	0	0	22.0	12	10	7	14	19
John Brebbia	1	0	7.71	19	0	0	18.2	22	18	16	11	20
Kyle Finnegan	3	0	1.50	16	0	4	18.0	9	3	3	4	23
Dietrich Enns	1	1	5.60	7	2	0	17.2	23	12	11	4	15
Dylan Smith	1	0	1.38	7	0	0	13.0	6	2	2	5	4
Bailey Horn	0	1	1.59	10	0	0	11.1	11	2	2	7	10
Carlos Hernández	0	0	10.13	11	0	0	10.2	14	13	12	6	13
Sean Guenther	0	1	5.23	9	1	0	10.1	10	7	6	5	8
Kenta Maeda	0	0	7.88	7	0	0	8.0	9	8	7	6	8
Matt Gage	0	0	0.00	6	0	0	5.2	7	0	0	2	3
Luke Jackson	0	0	7.71	3	0	0	4.2	3	4	4	5	4
Paul Sewald	0	0	4.15	4	0	0	4.1	4	2	2	2	2
Jake Rogers	0	0	2.45	4	0	0	3.2	5	1	1	0	0
Codi Heuer	0	0	5.40	2	0	0	3.1	3	2	2	2	4
Drew Sommers	0	1	18.00	4	0	0	3.0	7	6	6	3	3
Tyler Owens	0	0	3.00	3	0	0	3.0	3	1	1	3	1
José Urquidy	0	0	7.71	2	0	0	2.1	4	2	2	3	3
Geoff Hartlieb	0	0	9.00	2	0	0	2.0	3	2	2	2	1
Tanner Rainey	0	0	13.50	2	0	0	2.0	1	3	3	3	2
Tomas Nido	0	0	0.00	1	0	0	1.2	0	0	0	0	0
Alex Lange	0	0	0.00	1	0	0	1.0	2	0	0	1	1
Zach McKinstry	0	0	0.00	1	0	0	0.1	0	0	0	0	0
Totals	87	75	3.97	162	162	40	1436.1	1309	691	634	485	1375

Source:Baseball Reference

== Farm system ==
Level	Team	League	Manager
AAA	Toledo Mud Hens	International League	Gabe Alvarez
AA	Erie SeaWolves	Eastern League	Andrew Graham
High-A	West Michigan Whitecaps	Midwest League	Tony Cappucelli
Single-A	Lakeland Flying Tigers	Florida State League	Rene Rivera
Rookie	Florida Complex League Tigers	Florida Complex League	Salvador Panigua
Rookie	DSL Tigers 1	Dominican Summer League	Marco Yepez
Rookie	DSL Tigers 2	Dominican Summer League	Sandy Acevedo
