= J. P. Martínez =

Cuban baseball player (born 1996)

Saraperos de Saltillo – No. 51
- Outfielder
- Born: March 21, 1996 (age 30); Baracoa, Cuba
- Bats: Left Throws: Left

MLB debut
- August 11, 2023, for the Texas Rangers

MLB statistics (through 2024 season)
- Batting average: .220
- Home runs: 1
- Runs batted in: 4
- Stats at Baseball Reference

Teams
- Texas Rangers (2023); Atlanta Braves (2024)
Medals
Men's baseball
Representing Cuba
18U Baseball World Cup
Bronze medal – third place	2013 Taichung	Team

Julio Pablo Martínez Sánchez (born March 21, 1996) is a Cuban professional baseball outfielder for the Saraperos de Saltillo of the Mexican League. He has previously played in Major League Baseball (MLB) for the Texas Rangers and Atlanta Braves.

== Career ==
=== Cuban career ===
Martínez began his professional career in the Cuban National Series from 2012 through 2017, playing for Guantánamo, Isla de la Juventud, and Camagüey.

In 2016, Martínez played for the Cuba national baseball team when they played 20 games in the Can-Am League. He played for the Trois-Rivières Aigles in the Can-Am League in 2017. In November 2017, Martínez defected from Cuba.

=== Texas Rangers ===
Martínez signed with the Texas Rangers as an international free agent in March 2018. He made his professional debut that year with the DSL Rangers of the Rookie-level Dominican Summer League, and was promoted to the Spokane Indians of the Low–A Northwest League after nine games in the DSL in which he batted .409. In 60 games for Spokane he batted .266 with nine home runs, 24 RBIs, and 13 stolen bases. After the 2018 regular season, Martínez played for the Surprise Saguaros of the Arizona Fall League. On October 22, 2018, Martínez hit for the Cycle, going 4–4 with a walk. Martínez was ranked as the #78 overall prospect in baseball by Baseball Prospectus in their preseason 2019 Top 101 list. Martínez was also ranked as the #88 overall prospect in baseball by MLB Pipeline in their preseason 2019 Top 100 list.

Martínez was assigned to the Hickory Crawdads of the Single–A South Atlantic League to open the 2019 season. He was promoted to the Down East Wood Ducks of the High–A Carolina League on April 17, after hitting .250 with 1 home run and 5 RBI. With Down East, he hit .248/.319/.423/.741 with 14 home runs and 58 RBI over 113 games. Martínez did not play in a game in 2020 due to the cancellation of the minor league season because of the COVID-19 pandemic. He spent the 2021 season with the Frisco RoughRiders of the Double-A Central, hitting .242/.355/.368 with 5 home runs and 28 RBI. He split the 2022 season between Frisco and the Round Rock Express of the Triple-A Pacific Coast League, hitting a combined .243/.360/.433 with 15 home runs, 45 RBI, and 39 stolen bases. He returned to Round Rock to open the 2023 season, hitting .312/.427/.565 with 12 home runs, 55 RBI, and 33 stolen bases over 67 games.

On August 11, 2023, the Rangers selected Martínez's contract to the 40-man roster and promoted him to the major leagues for the first time to make his MLB debut that night. Martínez recorded his first MLB hit on August 12, a single off of Alex Cobb.

=== Atlanta Braves ===
On January 26, 2024, the Rangers traded Martínez to the Atlanta Braves in exchange for Tyler Owens. He was optioned to the Triple–A Gwinnett Stripers to begin the 2024 season. In seven games for the Braves, Martínez went 2–for–10 (.200). He was designated for assignment by Atlanta on July 8. Martínez cleared waivers and was sent outright to Gwinnett on July 10. He elected free agency following the season on November 4.

=== Saraperos de Saltillo ===
On March 4, 2025, Martínez signed with the Pericos de Puebla of the Mexican League. He was released by Puebla prior to the start of the season on April 16. On May 2, Martínez signed with the Saraperos de Saltillo. In 71 appearances for the team, he batted .341/.461/.626 with 15 home runs, 49 RBI, and 30 stolen bases.
