= Ryan Kreidler =

American baseball player (born 1997)

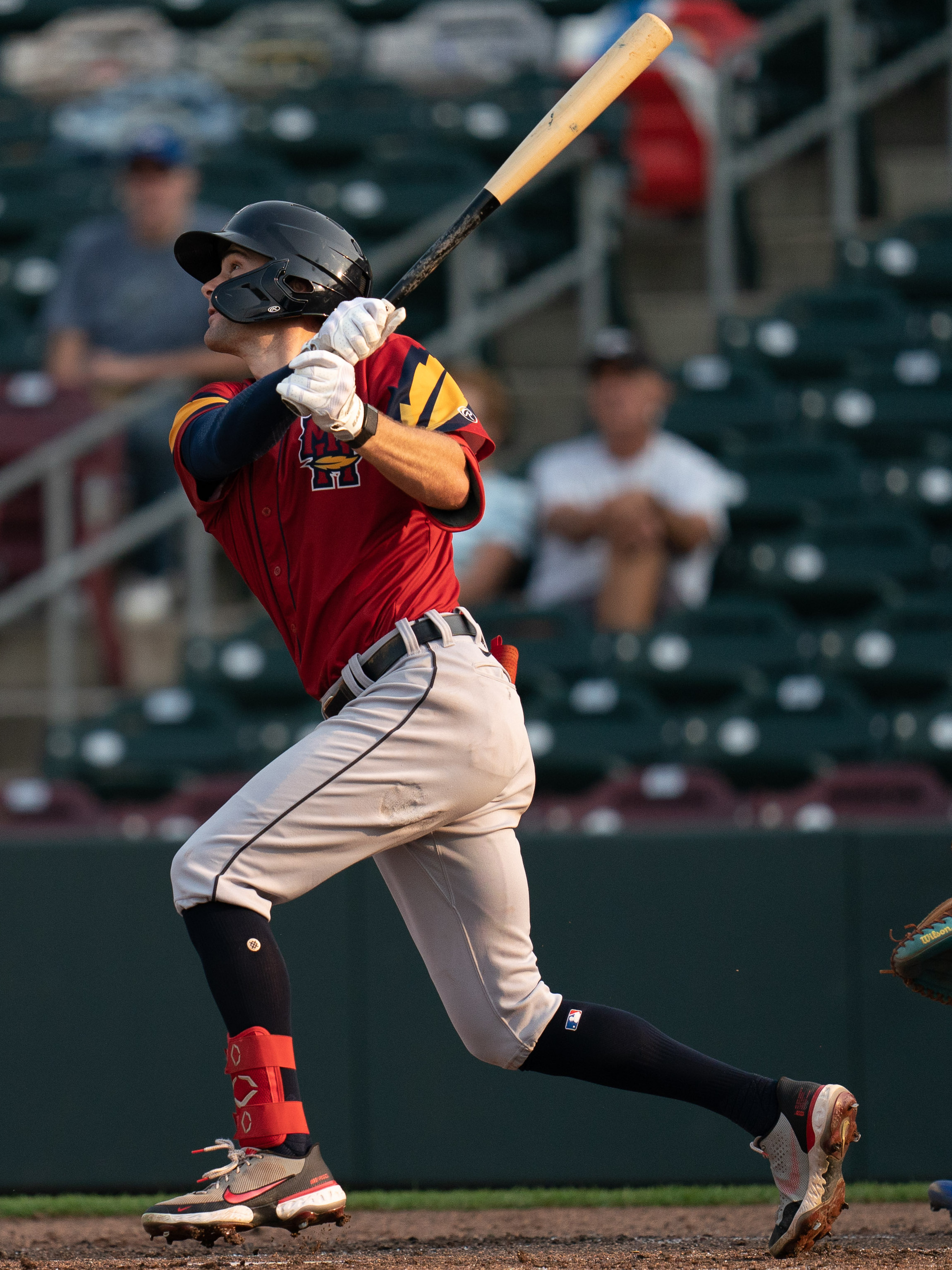
- Kreidler with the Toledo Mud Hens in 2021

Minnesota Twins – No. 5
- Utility player
- Born: November 12, 1997 (age 28); Davis, California, U.S.
- Bats: Right Throws: Right

MLB debut
- September 2, 2022, for the Detroit Tigers

MLB statistics (through 2026 season)
- Batting average: .183
- Home runs: 10
- Runs batted in: 37
- Stats at Baseball Reference

Teams
- Detroit Tigers (2022–2025); Minnesota Twins (2026–present)

Ryan Michael Kreidler (born November 12, 1997) is an American professional baseball utility player for the Minnesota Twins of Major League Baseball (MLB). He has previously played in MLB for the Detroit Tigers.

== Amateur career ==
Kreidler attended Davis High School in Davis, California. He was drafted by the Chicago Cubs in the 35th round of the 2016 Major League Baseball draft but did not sign. He enrolled at the University of California, Los Angeles (UCLA) and played college baseball for the UCLA Bruins. In 2018, he played collegiate summer baseball with the Wareham Gatemen of the Cape Cod Baseball League.

== Professional career ==
=== Detroit Tigers ===
Kreidler was drafted by the Detroit Tigers in the fourth round, with the 112th overall selection, of the 2019 Major League Baseball draft, and signed.

Kreidler made his professional debut with the Connecticut Tigers, batting .232 with two home runs and 20 RBI over sixty games. He did not play in a game in 2020 due to the cancellation of the minor league season because of the COVID-19 pandemic. He started 2021 with the Erie SeaWolves before being promoted to the Toledo Mud Hens. Over 129 games between the two teams, he slashed .270/.349/.454 with 22 home runs, 58 RBIs, and 15 stolen bases.

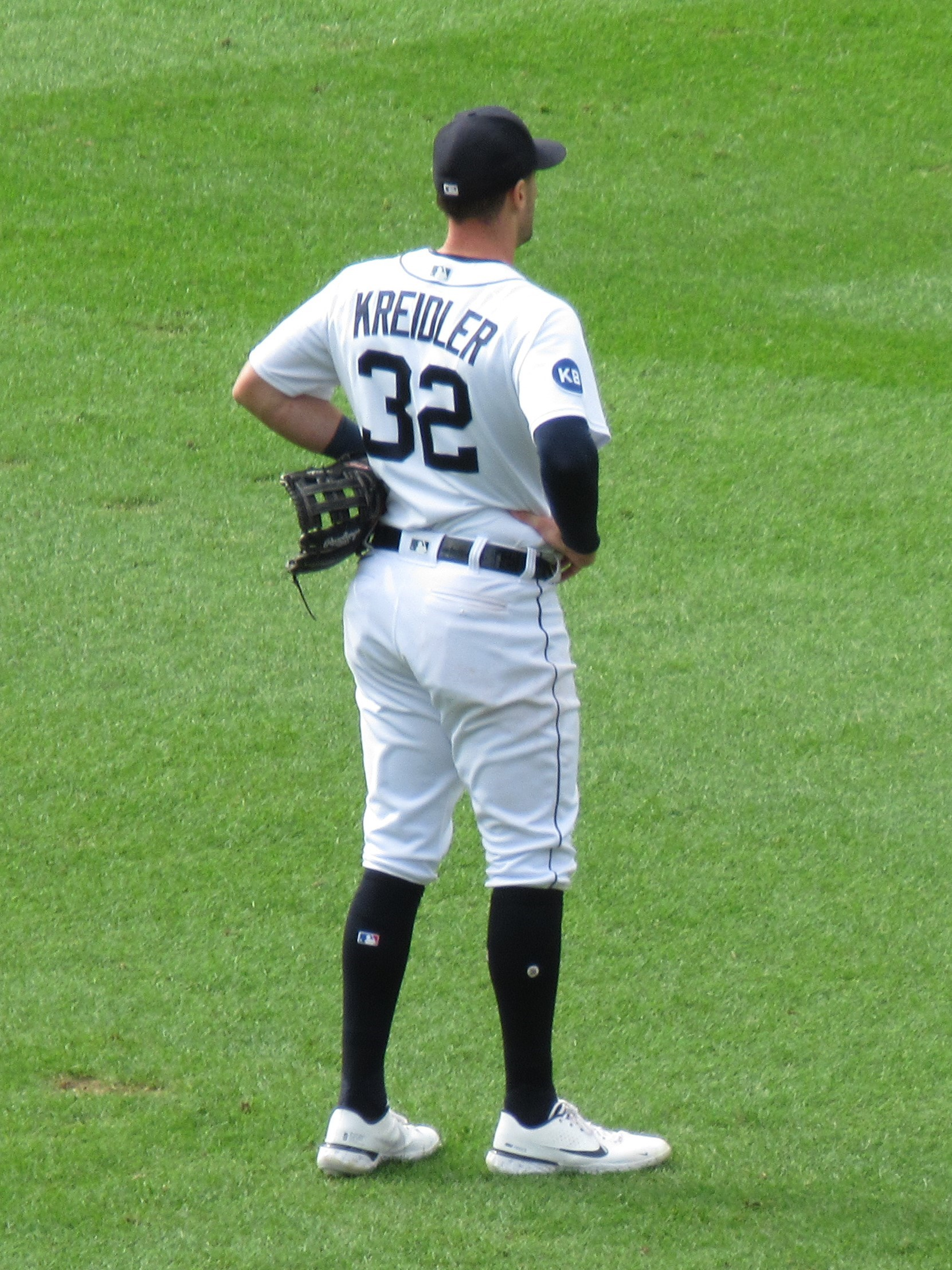
Kreidler with the Detroit Tigers in 2022

On September 1, 2022, Kreidler was selected to the 40-man roster and promoted to the major leagues for the first time. He recorded his first major league hit, a single, on September 3 against the Kansas City Royals. Kreidler's first major league home run on September 7 was a game-winner, and struck in the top of the ninth inning off José Quijada of the Los Angeles Angels to break a 4–4 tie.

In 2023, Kreidler was part of Detroit's Opening Day roster. He started at third base on opening day. Kreider was optioned back to Triple-A on April 15 after hitting .111 in 11 games. He was placed on the minor league injured list on April 28 with knee soreness, and began a rehab assignment with the High–A West Michigan Whitecaps in May. However, after 5 games he was pulled off rehab assignment, and it was announced that he had undergone core-muscle surgery on June 14.

Kreidler was optioned to Triple–A Toledo to begin the 2024 season. On April 11, 2024, he underwent surgery to repair a fractured right index finger. In 35 appearances for Detroit, Kreidler slashed .119/.200/.169 with one home run, two RBI, and five stolen bases.

In 2025, Kreidler was again part of Detroit's Opening Day roster. He was used primarily as a centerfielder at the start of the season due to injuries at that position. He was optioned to Triple-A Toledo on April 21 after struggling at the plate. On August 22, 2025, Kreidler was designated for assignment by the Tigers following the promotion of Drew Sommers.

=== Pittsburgh Pirates ===
On August 24, 2025, Kreidler was claimed off waivers by the Pittsburgh Pirates. In 15 appearances for the Triple-A Indianapolis Indians, he batted .163/.293/.265 with one home run, one RBI, and five stolen bases. Kreidler was designated for assignment following the acquisition of Will Robertson on October 13.

=== Minnesota Twins ===
On October 15, 2025, Kreidler was claimed off waivers by the Minnesota Twins. Kreidler was optioned to the Triple-A St. Paul Saints to begin the 2026 season. Kreidler made his Twins debut on April 11, 2026, following an injury to Royce Lewis.
