= Tyler Holton =

American baseball player (born 1996)

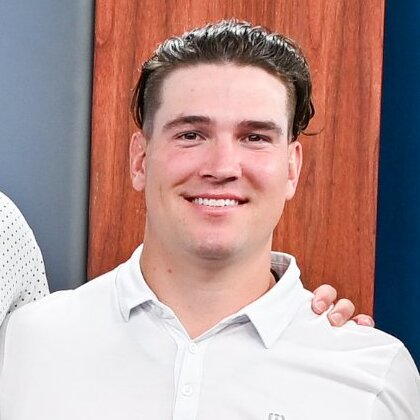
- Holton at the Pentagon in 2025

Detroit Tigers – No. 87
- Pitcher
- Born: June 13, 1996 (age 30); Tallahassee, Florida, U.S.
- Bats: Left Throws: Left

MLB debut
- April 28, 2022, for the Arizona Diamondbacks

MLB statistics (through 2026 season)
- Win–loss record: 18–14
- Earned run average: 2.65
- Strikeouts: 276
- Stats at Baseball Reference

Teams
- Arizona Diamondbacks (2022); Detroit Tigers (2023–present)

Weston Tyler Holton (born June 13, 1996) is an American professional baseball pitcher for the Detroit Tigers of Major League Baseball (MLB). He previously played in MLB for the Arizona Diamondbacks.

== Career ==
=== Amateur career ===
Holton graduated from Lincoln High School in Tallahassee, Florida, and enrolled at Florida State University to play college baseball for the Florida State Seminoles. In 2016, he played collegiate summer baseball with the Falmouth Commodores of the Cape Cod Baseball League.

The Miami Marlins selected Holton in the 35th round of the 2017 MLB draft, but he did not sign with them. Returning to Florida State in 2018, he tore the ulnar collateral ligament of the elbow and had Tommy John surgery.

=== Arizona Diamondbacks ===
The Arizona Diamondbacks selected Holton in the ninth round of the 2018 MLB draft, and he signed with Arizona. He made his professional debut in 2019, appearing in 13 games for the rookie-level AZL Diamondbacks and the Low-A Hillsboro Hops, where he logged a 2.39 earned run average (ERA) across 37.2 innings pitched. Holton did not play in a game in 2020 due to the cancellation of the minor league season because of the COVID-19 pandemic. Holton split the 2021 season between the Double-A Amarillo Sod Poodles and the Triple-A Reno Aces, but struggled to a 6.72 ERA with 78 strikeouts in 64.1 innings pitched across 26 appearances. He was assigned to Triple-A Reno to begin the 2022 season.

On April 28, 2022, the Diamondbacks selected Holton's contract and promoted him to the major leagues for the first time. He made his MLB debut that night, tossing a scoreless inning of relief against the St. Louis Cardinals. He made 10 appearances for Arizona in his rookie campaign, logging a 3.00 ERA with six strikeouts in nine innings pitched.

On February 15, 2023, Holton was designated for assignment by the Diamondbacks following the signing of Andrew Chafin.

=== Detroit Tigers ===
On February 17, 2023, Holton was claimed off waivers by the Detroit Tigers. Holton started the season being assigned to Triple-A Toledo Mud Hens. He was called up from Toledo on April 15, 2023. He finished his rookie season with a 3–2 record, 2.11 ERA. 0.867 WHIP, and a 4.11 strikeout-to-walk ratio in 85 1/3 innings.

In 2024, Holton filled multiple roles for the Tigers, from opener to middle relief to occasional closer. For the season, he went 7–2 and posted a 2.19 ERA with a stellar 0.78 WHIP. He struck out 77 batters in 94 1/3 innings pitched, and was 8-for-8 in save opportunities. In recognition of his central role to Tiger manager A. J. Hinch's "pitching chaos" strategy, Holton received a tenth-place MVP vote from sportswriter Mike Wilner of the Toronto Star. Holton was awarded the Detroit Tigers rookie of the year award by the Detroit Sports Media organization.

Holton again served in middle relief and as an occasional opener in 2025. He posted a 6–5 record with a 3.66 ERA, 1.042 WHIP, and 64 strikeouts in 78 2/3 innings.

On January 6, 2026, the Tigers and Holton agreed on a one-year, $1.575 million contract, avoiding arbitration.

== Personal life ==
Holton is a Christian. He is married to Storme Holton.
