= Jahmai Jones =

American baseball player (born 1997)

Boston Red Sox – No. 37
- Outfielder / Second baseman
- Born: August 4, 1997 (age 29); Roswell, Georgia, U.S.
- Bats: Right Throws: Right

MLB debut
- August 31, 2020, for the Los Angeles Angels

MLB statistics (through 2026 season)
- Batting average: .229
- Home runs: 14
- Runs batted in: 50
- Stats at Baseball Reference

Teams
- Los Angeles Angels (2020); Baltimore Orioles (2021); Milwaukee Brewers (2023); New York Yankees (2024); Detroit Tigers (2025–2026); Boston Red Sox (2026–present)

Jahmai Fitzgerald Jones (born August 4, 1997) is an American professional baseball outfielder and second baseman for the Boston Red Sox of Major League Baseball (MLB). He made his MLB debut in 2020 with the Los Angeles Angels and has also played in MLB for the Baltimore Orioles, Milwaukee Brewers, New York Yankees, and Detroit Tigers. Born in the United States, he represents the South Korea national team internationally.

== Early life and education ==
Jones attended the Wesleyan School in Peachtree Corners, Georgia. He played football during his freshman and sophomore seasons, totaling 1,137 yards on 76 pass receptions and 12 touchdowns in those years. He then focused on baseball. As a senior, he hit .464 with eight home runs, 21 runs batted in (RBIs), and 40 stolen bases and was named the Gwinnett Daily Post Baseball Player of the Year. He was selected by the Los Angeles Angels of Anaheim in the second round of the 2015 Major League Baseball draft.

== Career ==
=== Los Angeles Angels ===
Jones made his professional debut with the Arizona League Angels and spent all of 2015 there, posting a .244 batting average with two home runs, 20 RBI, and 16 stolen bases. In 2016, Jones started the season with the Orem Owlz and was promoted to the Burlington Bees during the season. He finished 2016 batting .302 with four home runs, 30 RBI, and twenty stolen bases in 64 games between both clubs.

In 2017, Jones played for both Burlington and the Inland Empire 66ers, posting a combined .282 batting average with 14 home runs, 47 RBI, 27 stolen bases and a .794 OPS in 127 games. In 2018, Jones played with Inland and the Mobile BayBears, slashing .239/.337/.380 with 10 home runs, 55 RBI, and 24 stolen bases in 123 games. In 2019, Jones spent the season with the Mobile BayBears, batting .234/.308/.324 with five home runs, fifty RBI, and nine stolen bases over 130 games. Following the season, he was selected to play in the Arizona Fall League for the Mesa Solar Sox, and also, he was added to the Angels 40-man roster.

On August 31, 2020, Jones made his MLB debut as a pinch runner. On September 26, 2020, Jones got his first career hit off of Tony Gonsolin of the Los Angeles Dodgers.

=== Baltimore Orioles ===
On February 2, 2021, Jones was traded to the Baltimore Orioles in exchange for pitcher Alex Cobb. He was assigned to the Triple-A Norfolk Tides to begin the season. He underwent Tommy John surgery on May 27, 2022, and was designated for assignment on May 28. He was released on June 3. In 67 official at-bats with Baltimore in 2021, he batted .149 with three RBI, four walks, and five runs.

=== Los Angeles Dodgers ===
Jones signed a two-year minor league contract with the Los Angeles Dodgers on July 23, 2022. In 62 games for the Triple–A Oklahoma City Dodgers in 2023, he had a .293 batting average with nine home runs and 34 RBI. On July 1, 2023, he opted out of his minor league contract and became a free agent.

=== Milwaukee Brewers ===
On July 3, 2023, Jones signed a major league contract with the Milwaukee Brewers and was added to their active roster. The very same day, Jones recorded his first hit as a Brewer - a game tying, three RBI double. In seven total games for Milwaukee, he went 2–for–10 (.200) with three RBI and one stolen base. Jones was designated for assignment on February 21, 2024, following the re–signing of Brandon Woodruff.

=== New York Yankees ===
On February 28, 2024, Jones was claimed off waivers by the New York Yankees. He made the Yankees' Opening Day roster. Jones hit his first major league home run on May 12. In 33 games for the Yankees, he batted .238/.304/.381 with one home run, four RBI, and one stolen base. Jones was designated for assignment by New York on July 29. He cleared waivers and was sent outright to the Triple–A Scranton/Wilkes-Barre RailRiders on August 2. Jones elected free agency following the season on November 4.

=== Detroit Tigers ===
On November 20, 2024, Jones signed a minor league contract with the Detroit Tigers. He played in 52 games for the Triple-A Toledo Mud Hens, slashing .276/.392/.482 with six home runs, 29 RBI, and eight stolen bases. On June 6, 2025, the Tigers selected Jones' contract, adding him to their active roster. In 2025, he played primarily as a platoon outfielder and pinch hitter against left-handed pitching. He played in 72 games at the major league level, batting .287 with a .387 on-base percentage, while hitting 7 home runs with 23 RBI. On July 9, 2026, Jones was designated for assignment by the Tigers.

=== Boston Red Sox ===
On July 14, 2026, Jones was traded to the Boston Red Sox in exchange for Jojo Ingrassia.

== International career ==
Jones represents the South Korean baseball team in international events. He made his debut in the 2026 World Baseball Classic.

== Personal life ==
Jones was born in the United States, to a Korean American mother and an African American father. He was raised in Roswell, Georgia. Jones's father, Andre Jones, played in the National Football League (NFL) for the Detroit Lions. He died in 2011 due to a brain aneurysm. Jones's mother, Michele Jones, was born in South Korea and adopted by a family in the U.S. Jones's brother, T. J. Jones, was an NFL wide receiver. His other brother, Malachi Jones, was also a wide receiver.
