= Tyler Owens (baseball) =

American baseball player (born 2001)

Pittsburgh Pirates
- Pitcher
- Born: January 9, 2001 (age 25); Ocala, Florida, U.S.
- Bats: Right Throws: Right

MLB debut
- May 1, 2025, for the Detroit Tigers

MLB statistics (through 2025 season)
- Win–loss record: 0-0
- Earned run average: 0.00
- Strikeouts: 1
- Stats at Baseball Reference

Teams
- Detroit Tigers (2025)

Tyler David Owens (born January 9, 2001) is an American professional baseball pitcher in the Pittsburgh Pirates organization. He made his Major League Baseball (MLB) debut for the Detroit Tigers in 2025.

== Professional career ==
=== Atlanta Braves ===
Owens drafted by the Atlanta Braves in the 13th round, with the 397th overall selection, of the 2019 Major League Baseball draft. He split his first professional season between the rookie–level Gulf Coast League Braves and rookie–level Danville Braves. Owens did not play in a game in 2020 due to the cancellation of the minor league season because of the COVID-19 pandemic.

Owens returned to action in 2021 with the Single–A Augusta GreenJackets, struggling to a 7.07 ERA with 17 strikeouts over 6 games (4 starts). He returned to Augusta in 2022, logging a 5–3 record and 5.20 ERA with 67 strikeouts and 5 saves across 32 appearances. Owens spent 2023 with the High–A Rome Braves and Double–A Mississippi Braves, accumulating an 0–6 record and 3.03 ERA with 67 strikeouts over 15 total games (8 starts).

=== Texas Rangers ===
On January 26, 2024, Owens was traded to the Texas Rangers in exchange for J. P. Martínez. In 26 relief outings for the Double–A Frisco RoughRiders, he compiled a 2.80 ERA with 35 strikeouts and eight saves over 38 1/3 innings pitched.

=== Detroit Tigers ===
On July 28, 2024, Owens and Liam Hicks were traded to the Detroit Tigers in exchange for Carson Kelly. He made 13 relief outings for the Double–A Erie SeaWolves, compiling a 1–3 record and 3.31 ERA with 20 strikeouts and 2 saves across 16 1/3 innings pitched. Following the season, the Tigers added Owens to their 40-man roster to protect him from the Rule 5 draft.

Owens was optioned to the Triple-A Toledo Mud Hens to begin the 2025 season. On May 1, 2025, Owens was promoted to the major leagues for the first time. In three appearances for Detroit, he recorded a 3.00 ERA with one strikeout over three innings of work. On July 30, 2025, Owens was designated for assignment following the acquisition of Rafael Montero. The Tigers released Owens after he cleared waivers on August 1, 2025. On August 5, Owens re-signed with Detroit on a minor league contract.

Owens made 35 appearances for Double–A Erie in 2026, posting a 5–2 record and 4.19 ERA with 46 strikeouts and four saves; he also appeared in five contests for the Single–A Lakeland Flying Tigers. The Tigers released Owens from his minor league contract on August 18, 2026.

=== Pittsburgh Pirates ===
On August 26, 2026, Owens signed a minor league contract with the Pittsburgh Pirates. In 4 games with Double-A Altoona Curve he threw 4 innings of relief going 0-1 with a 6.75 ERA with 5 strikeouts and one save.
