= Will Vest =

American baseball player (born 1995)

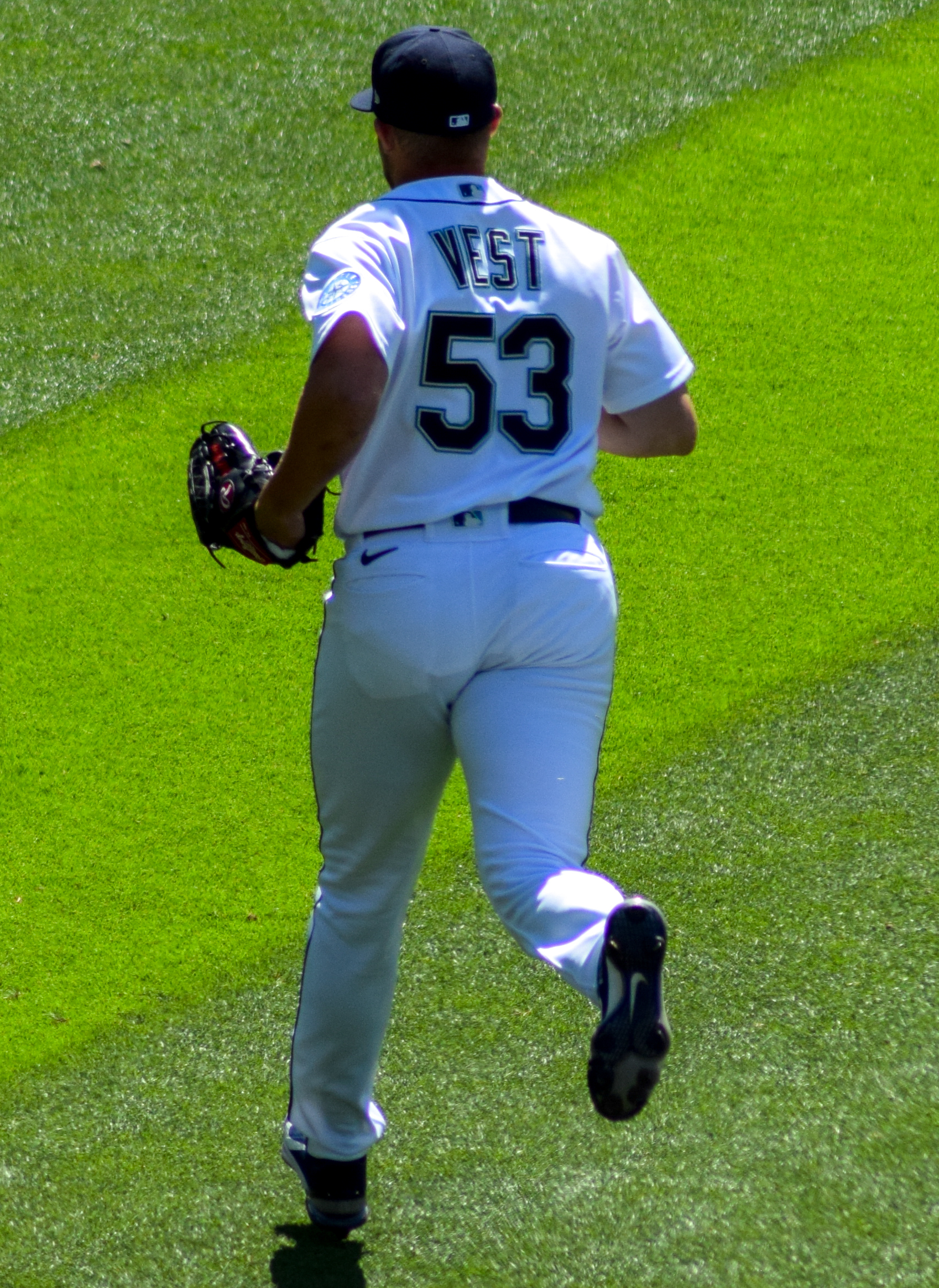
- Vest with the Mariners in 2021

Detroit Tigers – No. 19
- Pitcher
- Born: June 6, 1995 (age 31); Houston, Texas, U.S.
- Bats: Right Throws: Right

MLB debut
- April 1, 2021, for the Seattle Mariners

MLB statistics (through June 22, 2026)
- Win–loss record: 18–17
- Earned run average: 3.73
- Strikeouts: 309
- Stats at Baseball Reference

Teams
- Seattle Mariners (2021); Detroit Tigers (2022–present)
Medals
Men's baseball
Representing United States
World Baseball Classic
Silver medal – second place	2026 Miami	Team

William Lane Vest (born June 6, 1995) is an American professional baseball pitcher for the Detroit Tigers of Major League Baseball (MLB). He previously played in MLB for the Seattle Mariners. Vest made his MLB debut in 2021.

== Career ==
=== Amateur career ===
Vest attended Ridge Point High School in Sienna, Texas. He played for the school's baseball team as a shortstop. He enrolled at Stephen F. Austin State University, where he played college baseball for the Stephen F. Austin Lumberjacks. Vest became a pitcher in college.

=== Detroit Tigers ===
The Detroit Tigers selected Vest in the 12th round, with the 365th overall pick, in the 2017 MLB draft. Vest made his professional debut with the Low-A Connecticut Tigers, posting a 3–1 record and 2.83 ERA in 21 games. He split the 2018 season between the Single-A West Michigan Whitecaps and the High-A Lakeland Flying Tigers, recording a cumulative 4–4 record and 5.18 ERA in 30 appearances. In 2019, Vest split the year between Lakeland, the Double-A Erie SeaWolves, and the Triple-A Toledo Mud Hens, pitching to a 3–5 record and 3.27 ERA with 58 strikeouts in 55 innings pitched in 37 games between the three teams.

Vest did not play in a game in 2020, as the minor league season was cancelled due to the COVID-19 pandemic.

=== Seattle Mariners ===
On December 10, 2020, the Seattle Mariners selected Vest from the Tigers in the Rule 5 draft. He made the Mariners' Opening Day roster and made his major league debut in relief on Opening Day. On July 12, Vest was designated for assignment by Seattle after recording a 6.17 ERA in 32 relief appearances.

=== Detroit Tigers (second stint) ===
Vest cleared waivers and Seattle returned him to the Tigers on July 17, 2021. The Tigers assigned Vest to Toledo.

Vest made the Tigers' Opening Day roster for the 2022 season. On May 13, 2022, Vest picked up his first career save in a 4–2 victory over the Baltimore Orioles. He entered a bases-loaded situation with one out in the ninth inning, and struck out both batters he faced. On May 20, Vest was placed on the non-injury (COVID-19) inactive list. He returned to the Tigers on May 31.

The Tigers optioned Vest to Toledo to start the 2023 season. On April 18, 2023, Vest was called up from Toledo to be the 27th man on the roster during a doubleheader against the Cleveland Guardians. He was sent back down to Toledo without appearing in either game. Vest returned to the Tigers three days later after another pitcher ended up on the injured list. On June 26, Vest had to enter the game in the first inning after starter Matthew Boyd left the game suddenly with elbow discomfort. Vest had to leave the game the following inning with right knee discomfort. He was placed on the injured list the next day along with Boyd. In his abbreviated 2023 season, Vest pitched 48 1/3 innings, striking out 56 batters and posting a 2.98 ERA.

In 2024, Vest primarily filled middle relief and setup roles for the Tigers. He posted a 2.82 ERA with 63 strikeouts in 70 1/3 innings.

On January 9, 2025, the Tigers and Vest agreed to a one-year, $1.4 million contract, avoiding arbitration. While manager A. J. Hinch does not name a full-time closer, Vest received the majority of the closing opportunities in 2025. He had 15 saves as of the All-Star break, while teammate Tommy Kahnle was next closest with 9. By season's end, Vest had a team-leading 23 saves, with a 3.01 ERA and 75 strikeouts in 68 2/3 innings. Vest earned a save in Game 1 of the American League Wild Card Series against the Cleveland Guardians. He also pitched the final 1 2/3 innings of the clinching Game 3 victory, but it was not a save situation when he entered. Overall in the 2025 playoffs, he pitched eight innings, allowing only two hits and no runs.

On January 6, 2026, the Tigers and Vest agreed on a one-year, $3.95 million contract, avoiding arbitration. On May 2, Vest was placed on the 15-day injured list with right lateral forearm inflammation. In 27 appearances for Detroit, he struggled to a 3–5 record and 6.08 ERA with 27 strikeouts and two saves across 26 2/3 innings pitched. On July 31, Vest underwent season-ending surgery to address a stress fracture in his elbow; it was concurrently announced that Vest would require a future hip surgery.

== Pitch selection ==
Vest throws four-seam and sinking two-seam fastballs, both averaging 95 MPH (153 KPH). The four-seam fastball has topped out at 99 MPH (159 KPH). His primary offspeed pitches are a slider that averages 86–87 MPH (138–140 KPH) and a changeup averaging 87 MPH (140 KPH). In 2025, Vest has added velocity to his slider; it now averages 89 MPH (143 KPH) and is often thrown above 90 MPH (145 KPH).

== See also ==
- Rule 5 draft results
