= Tomás Nido =

Puerto Rican baseball player (born 1994)

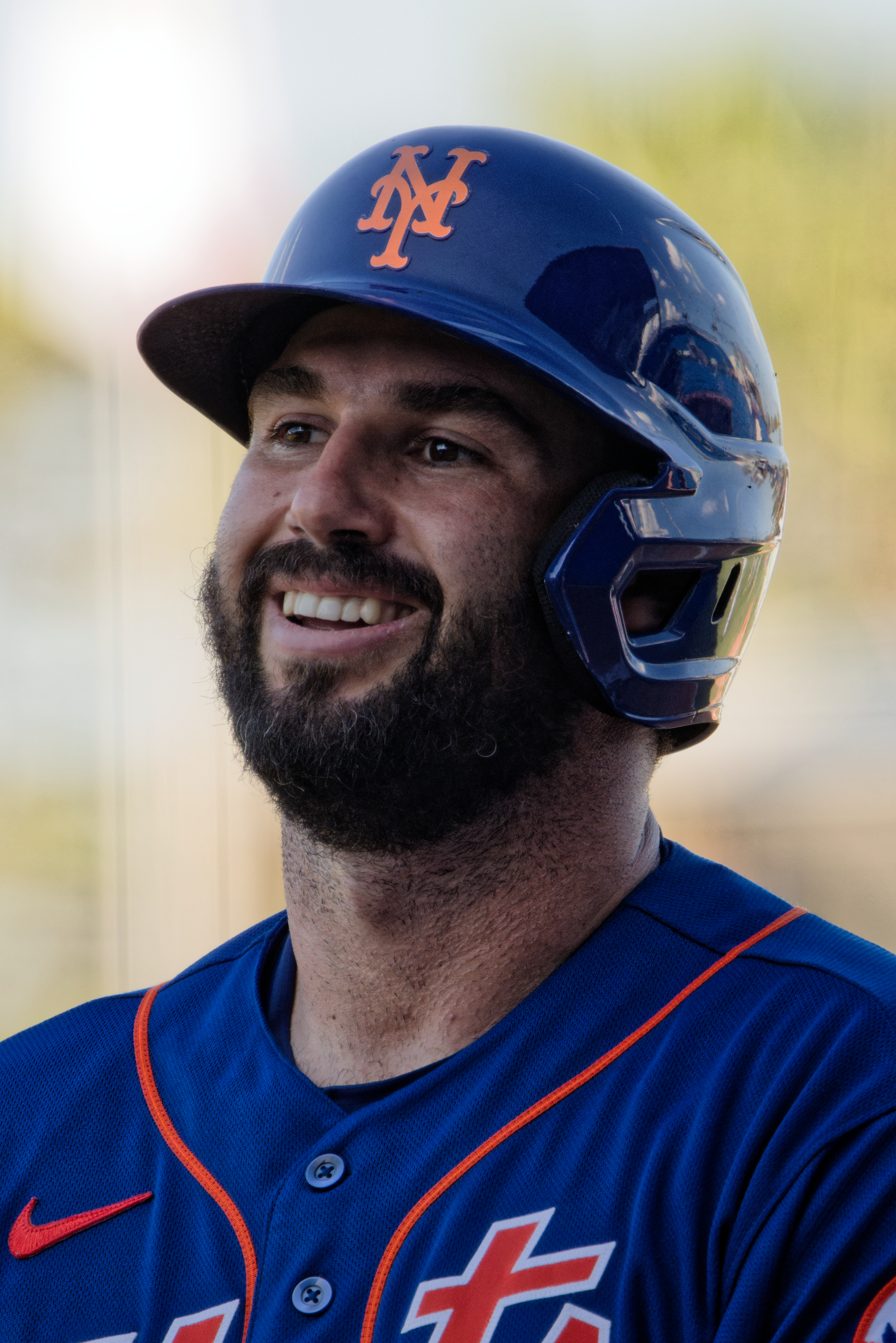
- Nido with the New York Mets in 2023

Free agent
- Catcher
- Born: April 12, 1994 (age 32); Guaynabo, Puerto Rico
- Bats: Right Throws: Right

MLB debut
- September 13, 2017, for the New York Mets

MLB statistics (through 2025 season)
- Batting average: .215
- Home runs: 17
- Runs batted in: 88
- Stats at Baseball Reference

Teams
- New York Mets (2017–2024); Chicago Cubs (2024); Detroit Tigers (2025)

Tomás Enrique Nido Vicéns (born April 12, 1994) is a Puerto Rican professional baseball catcher who is a free agent. He has previously played in Major League Baseball (MLB) for the New York Mets, Chicago Cubs, and Detroit Tigers. He made his MLB debut in 2017 with the Mets.

== Early life ==
Nido was born to two sport lineages that have represented Puerto Rico internationally. His mother is multi-sport athlete Liana Vicens, who competed as a swimmer in the 1968 Summer Olympics (at the age of 11), while his father, Tomás Nido Sr., won a medal in tennis at the 1982 Central American and Caribbean Games and played tennis at Louisiana State University. He is also the grandson of former member of the Puerto Rico national basketball team, Enrique Vicéns. The "Best Player in the World" of the 1959 FIBA World Championship Juan "Pachín" Vicéns is his great uncle. His uncles Michael Vicens and Miguel Nido were also professional athletes (in basketball and tennis respectively). Another, Carlos Nido, played tennis collegiately at Indiana University.

Nido was born in Guaynabo, Puerto Rico. He grew up in Puerto Rico and played baseball at the Puerto Rico High School Baseball Academy. While in high school he moved to Oviedo, Florida, to play his last two years of high school baseball in the continental United States and lived with the family of a teammate. When that teammate graduated, Nido's mother moved to Florida to live with him.

Nido attended Orangewood Christian School in Maitland, Florida. He committed to attend Florida State University to play college baseball for the Florida State Seminoles.

== Professional career ==
=== New York Mets ===
The New York Mets selected him in the eighth round of the 2012 Major League Baseball draft. Rather than attend Florida State, Nido signed with the Mets, receiving a $250,000 signing bonus. He made his professional debut with the Kingsport Mets of the Rookie-level Appalachian League. Nido played 2013 and 2014 with the Brooklyn Cyclones of the Low-A New York-Penn League and 2015 with the Savannah Sand Gnats of the Single-A South Atlantic League. In 2016, he played for the St. Lucie Mets of the High-A Florida State League, and won the league's batting title with a .320 average. The Mets added him to their 40-man roster after the 2016 season.

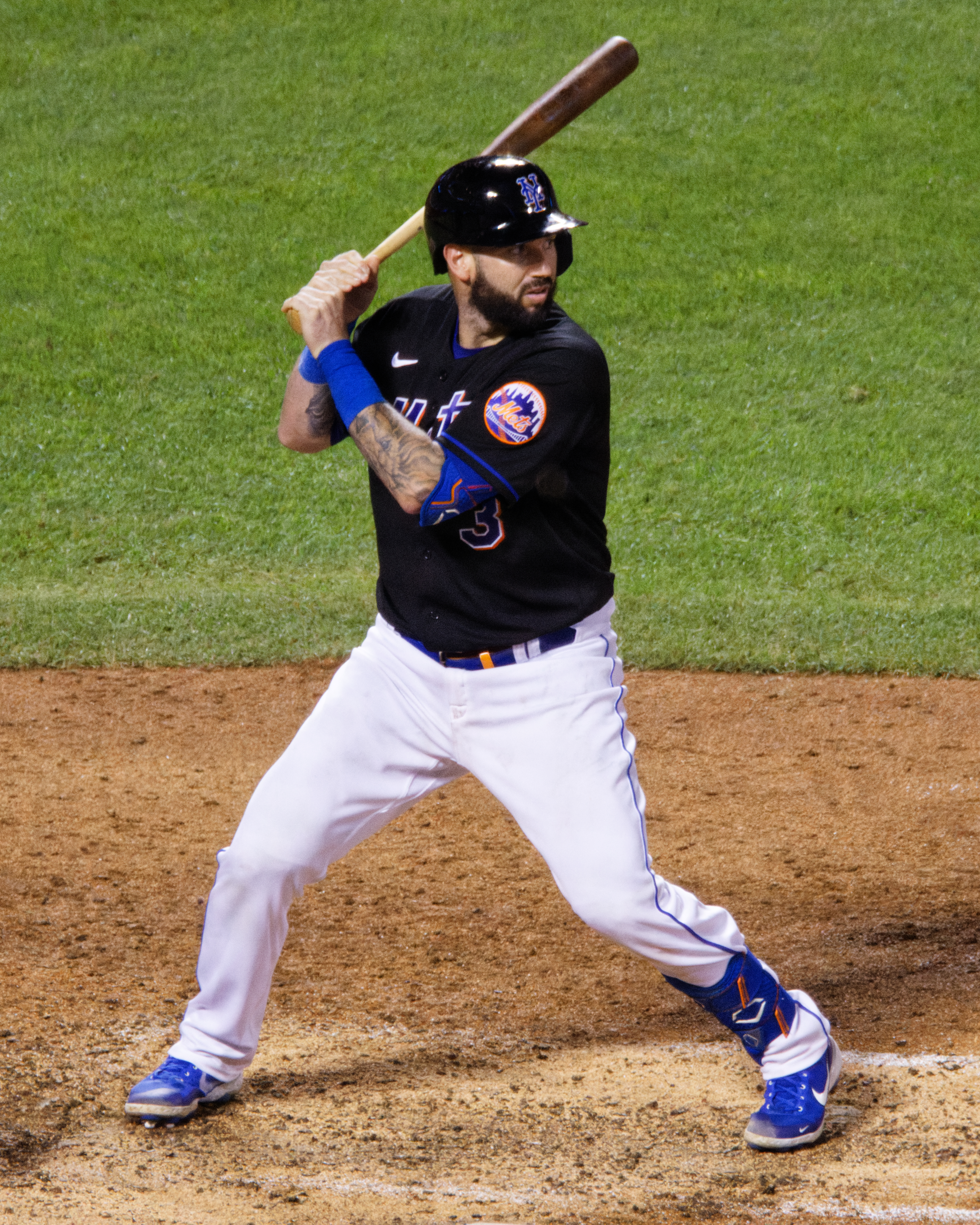
Nido batting for the Mets in 2022

In 2017, Nido began the season with the Binghamton Rumble Ponies of the Double-A Eastern League. He appeared in the All-Star Futures Game.

The Mets promoted Nido to the major leagues on September 12, 2017. He made his major league debut on September 13 against the Chicago Cubs at Wrigley Field and recorded his first hit the following day off of Félix Peña of the Cubs. After the regular season, he played for the Scottsdale Scorpions of the Arizona Fall League.

MLB.com ranked Nido as New York's 11th ranked prospect going into the 2018 season. He began the 2018 season with Binghamton. When Travis d'Arnaud tore his ulnar collateral ligament of the elbow on April 11, the Mets promoted Nido to the major leagues. On May 25, 2019, in a game against the Detroit Tigers, Nido hit his first career walk-off home run, off of pitcher Buck Farmer. In 2019, Nido slashed .191/.231/.316 with 4 home runs and 14 RBI in 50 games for the Mets. Nido ended his 2020 season early due to a positive COVID-19 test and related complications that prevented him from returning. His final batting line read .292/.346/.583 with 2 home runs and 6 RBI on the year. In 2021 he batted .222/.261/.327.

Nido and the Mets agreed to a salary of $890,000 for the 2022 season, avoiding salary arbitration. In 2022 he batted .239/.276/.324, and tied for the major league lead in sacrifice hits with 12. On October 20, 2022, Nido was named one of three finalists for the National League Gold Glove Award for catchers. Nido has earned a reputation throughout his career as being an excellent defensive catcher.

Before the 2023 season, Nido and the Mets agreed to a two-year, $3.7 million contract. In 22 games, he limped to a .125/.153/.125 batting line with no home runs and one RBI. An issue with his eyes, which had led to a stint on the Injured List in May, may have affected Nido's hitting. The Mets designated Nido for assignment on June 5, 2023, after Omar Narváez was activated from the injured list. He cleared waivers and was sent outright to the Triple–A Syracuse Mets on June 9.

On April 20, 2024, Nido had his contract selected to the major league roster after Francisco Álvarez was placed on the injured list. In 32 games, he batted .229/.261/.361 with three home runs and eight RBI, while supplying solid defense behind the plate. Nido was designated for assignment when Álvarez returned from the injured list on June 11. On June 17, the Mets released Nido.

=== Chicago Cubs ===
On June 19, 2024, Nido signed a major league contract with the Chicago Cubs. In 17 games for the Cubs, he hit .128/.143/.234 with one home run and four RBI. On July 31, it was announced that Nido would be out four–to–six weeks after undergoing surgery to repair a right meniscus tear. Nido was released by the Cubs on August 30.

=== Detroit Tigers ===
On September 18, 2024, Nido signed a minor league contract with the Detroit Tigers. In three games for the Triple-A Toledo Mud Hens, he went 2-for-9 (.222) with two RBI. Nido elected free agency following the season on November 4.

On January 10, 2025, Nido re-signed with the Tigers on a minor league contract. Nido had his contract purchased by the Tigers on April 8, after Jake Rogers was placed on the injured list. In 10 appearances for Detroit, he slashed .343/.361/.343 with two RBI. On May 20, Nido was designated for assignment by the Tigers. He cleared waivers and was sent outright to Triple-A Toledo on May 23. Nido elected free agency on October 15.

On October 30, 2025, Nido signed a new minor league contract to return to the Tigers organization. Nido made 43 appearances for Triple–A Toledo, slashing .236/.317/.368 with three home runs and 10 RBI. He was released from his minor league contract by the Tigers on July 21, 2026.

=== Boston Red Sox ===
On August 27, 2026, Nido signed a minor league contract with the Boston Red Sox. In 10 games with Triple-A Worcester Red Sox he batted .158/.200/.184 with no home runs and two RBIs. He elected free agency on November 2.
