= Mason Englert =

American baseball player (born 1999)

Tampa Bay Rays – No. 59
- Pitcher
- Born: November 1, 1999 (age 26); Alpine, Texas, U.S.
- Bats: Switch Throws: Right

MLB debut
- March 30, 2023, for the Detroit Tigers

MLB statistics (through 2026 season)
- Win–loss record: 5–8
- Earned run average: 5.12
- Strikeouts: 139
- Stats at Baseball Reference

Teams
- Detroit Tigers (2023–2024); Tampa Bay Rays (2025–present)

Mason Alexander Englert (born November 1, 1999) is an American professional baseball pitcher for the Tampa Bay Rays of Major League Baseball (MLB). He has previously played in MLB for the Detroit Tigers. He made his MLB debut in 2023.

== Career ==
=== Amateur career ===
Englert attended Forney High School in Forney, Texas. In his senior season of 2018, Englert recorded 168 strikeouts over 98 1/3 innings. Englert broke a Texas high school baseball record by throwing 55 1/3 consecutive scoreless innings; a record previously held by David Clyde. Englert committed to Texas A&M University to play college baseball.

=== Texas Rangers ===
The Texas Rangers selected Englert in the fourth round, with the 119th overall selection, of the 2018 MLB draft. He signed with Texas for an over-slot $1 million signing bonus. After signing, Englert did not appear in an official game with a Rangers affiliate in the 2018 season. Instead, he took part in a new program put in place by Texas for their newly drafted high school pitchers. The "de-load" program as the organization called it, emphasized building a foundation mentally and physically while resting the pitchers' bodies from a strenuous senior season and pre-draft showcase circuit. The players were put through a strength program and classroom work until the post-season fall instructional training started.

Englert suffered a torn ulnar collateral ligament of the elbow and underwent Tommy John surgery in April 2019, causing him to miss the entire season. He did not play in a game in 2020 due to the cancellation of the minor league season because of the COVID-19 pandemic. Englert spent the 2021 season with the Down East Wood Ducks of the Low-A East, going 6–3 with a 4.25 ERA and 90 strikeouts over 80 2/3 innings. Englert split the 2022 season between the Hickory Crawdads of the High-A South Atlantic League and the Frisco RoughRiders of the Double-A Texas League, going a combined 8–6 with a 3.64 ERA and 136 strikeouts over 118 2/3 innings. On August 12, 2022, Englert threw 7 innings of a combined no-hitter for Hickory.

=== Detroit Tigers ===
On December 7, 2022, Englert was selected by the Detroit Tigers in the Rule 5 draft. On March 29, 2023, the Tigers announced that Englert had made the Opening Day roster. In 31 outings in his rookie campaign, he logged a 4–3 record and 5.46 ERA with 41 strikeouts across 56 innings of work. Englert pitched out of the Tigers bullpen until July 24, when he went on the injured list with hip tightness. After a setback with his rehab, Englert remained on the injured list for the rest of the season.

Englert was optioned to the Triple–A Toledo Mud Hens to begin the 2024 season. Englert was called up on May 23, 2024. In 12 appearances for Detroit, he posted a 5.40 ERA with 16 strikeouts across 21 2/3 innings pitched. Englert was designated for assignment by the Tigers on February 7, 2025.

=== Tampa Bay Rays ===
On February 12, 2025, Englert was traded to the Tampa Bay Rays in exchange for Drew Sommers.

== See also ==
- Rule 5 draft results
