= Chase Lee =

American baseball player (born 1998)

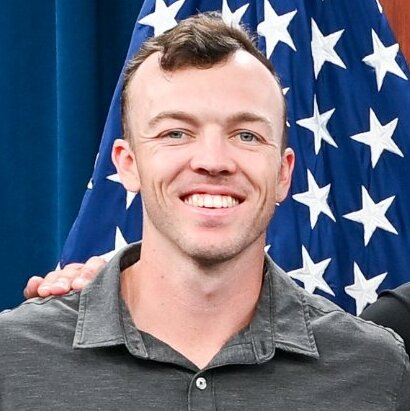
- Lee at the Pentagon in 2025

Colorado Rockies
- Pitcher
- Born: August 13, 1998 (age 28); Birmingham, Alabama, U.S.
- Bats: Right Throws: Right

MLB debut
- April 22, 2025, for the Detroit Tigers

MLB statistics (through 2026 season)
- Win–loss record: 5–1
- Earned run average: 4.60
- Strikeouts: 41
- Stats at Baseball Reference

Teams
- Detroit Tigers (2025); Toronto Blue Jays (2026)

Chase Alexander Lee (born August 13, 1998) is an American professional baseball pitcher for the Colorado Rockies of Major League Baseball (MLB). He has previously played in MLB for the Detroit Tigers and Toronto Blue Jays.

== Amateur career ==
Lee grew up in McCalla, Alabama and attended McAdory High School. He played mostly shortstop in high school and was used as a pitcher sparingly in one season.

Lee enrolled at the University of Alabama after having received no offers to play college baseball. He tried out for the Alabama Crimson Tide baseball team as a freshman, but was not offered a spot on the team. Lee changed his pitching motion to a sidearm delivery at the recommendation of Alabama head coach Brad Bohannon and joined the Alabama club baseball team, where he posted a 7–0 record and a 0.21 ERA.

Lee made the Crimson Tide as a walk-on the following season and posted a 2.67 ERA in 22 appearances with 24 strikeouts over 31 1/3 innings pitched. After the end of the season he played collegiate summer baseball for the Bethesda Big Train of the Cal Ripken Collegiate Baseball League and was named the league's Pitcher of the Year after leading the league with 51 strikeouts and seven saves with an ERA of 1.03. Lee was named Alabama's closer going into his redshirt sophomore season and had a 1.64 ERA and 19 strikeouts in five appearances before the season was cut short due to the coronavirus pandemic. As a junior, he was named a third team All-American after posting a 7–0 record with a 1.33 ERA and 51 strikeouts in 40 2/3 innings pitched.

== Professional career ==
=== Texas Rangers ===
The Texas Rangers selected Lee in the sixth round of the 2021 Major League Baseball draft. After signing with the team he was assigned to the Rookie-level Arizona Complex League Rangers, where he made one appearance before being promoted to the Double-A Frisco RoughRiders. He finished the season going 0–1 with a 3.71 ERA and 27 strikeouts over 17 innings for Frisco. Lee returned to Frisco to open the 2022 season, going 1–1 with a 2.25 ERA and 30 strikeouts over 24 innings, before being promoted to the Round Rock Express of the Triple-A Pacific Coast League on June 14. With Round Rock, Lee went 1–1 with a 5.46 ERA and 41 strikeouts over 31 1/3 innings. Lee was named the Texas Rangers 2022 minor league Reliever of the Year.

Lee received a non-roster invitation to major league spring training in 2023 and returned to Round Rock for the 2023 season, going 3–4 with a 3.98 ERA and 87 strikeouts over 63 1/3 innings. He made eight appearances for Round Rock in 2024, recording a 1.69 ERA with 11 strikeouts across 10 2/3 innings pitched.

=== Detroit Tigers ===
On July 30, 2024, Lee and Joseph Montalvo were traded to the Detroit Tigers in exchange for Andrew Chafin. In 17 appearances for the Triple–A Toledo Mud Hens, he logged a 1–3 record and 3.27 ERA with 31 strikeouts across 22 innings pitched. Following the season, the Tigers added Lee to their 40-man roster to protect him from the Rule 5 draft.

Lee was optioned to Triple-A Toledo to begin the 2025 season. On April 22, 2025, Lee was promoted to the major leagues for the first time. He made his major league debut that evening against the San Diego Padres, tossing 1 2/3 scoreless innings with one strikeout. Lee recorded his first career win on May 21, tossing two scoreless innings of relief against the St. Louis Cardinals. Lee made 32 appearances for Detroit during his rookie campaign, compiling a 4-1 record and 4.10 ERA with 36 strikeouts across 37 1/3 innings pitched.

=== Toronto Blue Jays ===
On December 12, 2025, Lee was traded to the Toronto Blue Jays in exchange for minor league pitcher Johan Simon. Lee was optioned to the Triple-A Buffalo Bisons to begin the regular season. Lee bounced between Triple-A and the Blue Jays, being recalled to Toronto on 4 occasions. He recorded his first major league save on August 5, 2026 against the Houston Astros in the 10th inning. He was designated for assignment on November 19.

=== Colorado Rockies ===
On November 20, the Blue Jays traded Lee to the Colorado Rockies in exchange for cash considerations.
