= Sawyer Gipson-Long =

American baseball player (born 1997)

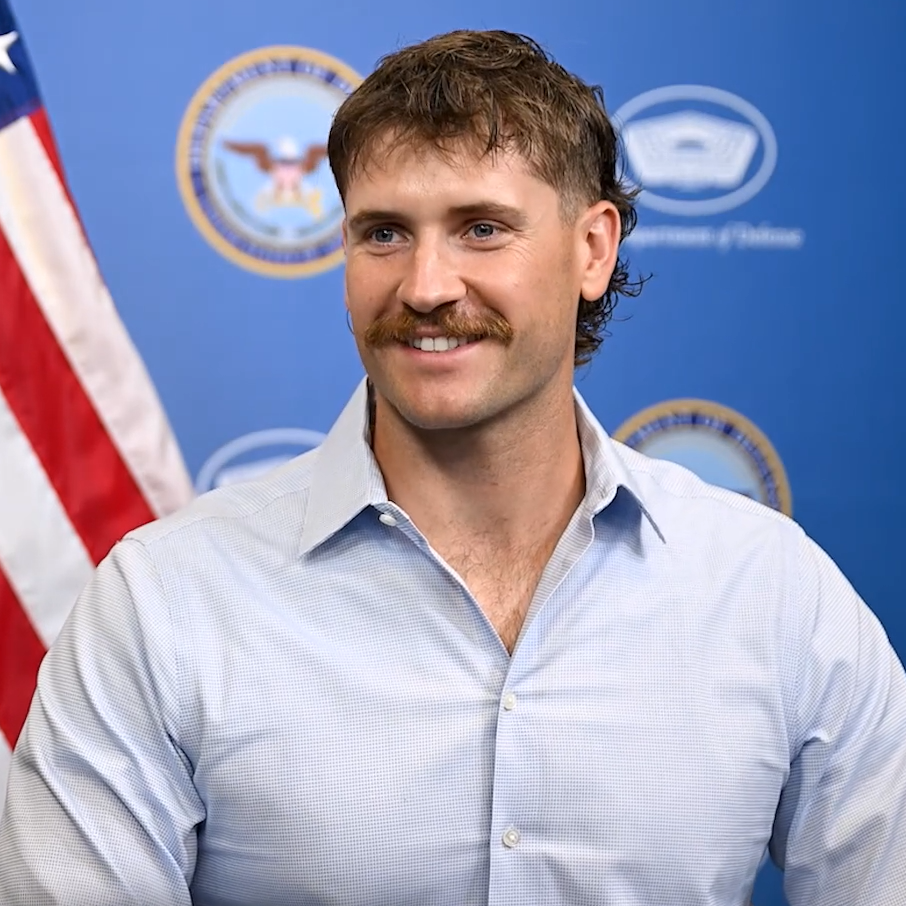
- Gipson-Long at the Pentagon in 2025

Detroit Tigers
- Pitcher
- Born: December 12, 1997 (age 28); Lithia Springs, Georgia, U.S.
- Bats: Right Throws: Right

MLB debut
- September 10, 2023, for the Detroit Tigers

MLB statistics (through 2025 season)
- Win–loss record: 1–2
- Earned run average: 5.44
- Strikeouts: 52
- Stats at Baseball Reference

Teams
- Detroit Tigers (2023, 2025)

Alec Sawyer Gipson-Long (born December 12, 1997) is an American professional baseball pitcher in the Detroit Tigers organization.

== Career ==
Gipson-Long played college baseball at Mercer University.

=== Minnesota Twins ===
Gipson-Long was drafted by the Minnesota Twins in the sixth round, with the 179th overall selection, of the 2019 Major League Baseball draft. He made his professional debut with the rookie–level Elizabethton Twins. In 6 starts, he recorded a 5.40 ERA with 23 strikeouts in 18 1/3 innings pitched. Gipson-Long did not play in a game in 2020 due to the cancellation of the minor league season because of the COVID-19 pandemic.

He returned to action in 2021, splitting the year between the Single–A Fort Myers Miracle and High–A Cedar Rapids Kernels. In 20 games (19 starts), Gipson-Long registered a cumulative 8–8 record and 4.55 ERA with 134 strikeouts in 97.0 innings of work. He began the 2022 season with Cedar Rapids, and was promoted to the Double–A Wichita Wind Surge after posting a 1.99 ERA across 10 starts. In 8 games (7 starts), he struggled to a 7.17 ERA with 35 strikeouts in 37 2/3 innings pitched.

=== Detroit Tigers ===
On August 2, 2022, Gipson-Long was traded to the Detroit Tigers in exchange for Michael Fulmer. He spent the remainder of the year with the Double–A Erie SeaWolves, posting a 4.54 ERA with 35 strikeouts in 35 2/3 innings of work across 7 starts.

Gipson-Long began the 2023 season with Double–A Erie, making 14 appearances (13 starts) and registering a 6–5 record and 3.74 ERA with 76 strikeouts in 65 innings of work. On September 10, 2023, Gipson-Long was selected to the 40-man roster and promoted to the major leagues for the first time. Gipson-Long began the 2024 season on the 15-day injury list with a groin strain. On April 19, 2024, the Tigers announced that Gipson-Long would require Tommy John surgery and would miss the remainder of the 2024 season. He had been rehabbing the groin strain injury when he reported right forearm tightness which was then determined to require the surgery. Gipson-Long underwent an additional surgery, repairing a left hip labral tear, on July 9.

On June 4, 2025, Gipson-Long was activated from the injured list to make his return from surgery. After making five starts on June, Gipson-Long returned to the 10-day injured list with neck stiffness on July 2. Gipson-Long was activated from the injured list on August 13, 2025.

Gipson-Long made 27 appearances (including 26 starts) solely for Triple–A Toledo Mud Hens during the 2026 season, compiling a 3–6 record and 5.50 ERA with 111 strikeouts across 109 2/3 innings pitched. On November 2, 2026, Gipson-Long was released by the Tigers.

On November 16, he re-signed with the Tigers on a minor league contract.
