= Dylan Smith (baseball) =

American baseball player (born 2000)

San Francisco Giants – No. 66
- Pitcher
- Born: May 28, 2000 (age 26); Huntsville, Alabama, U.S.
- Bats: Right Throws: Right

MLB debut
- June 2, 2025, for the Detroit Tigers

MLB statistics (through 2026 season)
- Win–loss record: 1–6
- Earned run average: 3.25
- Strikeouts: 49
- Stats at Baseball Reference

Teams
- Detroit Tigers (2025); San Francisco Giants (2026–present)

Dylan Miguel Smith (born May 28, 2000) is an American professional baseball pitcher for the San Francisco Giants of Major League Baseball (MLB). He made his MLB debut with the Detroit Tigers in 2025.

== Amateur career ==
Smith grew up in Stafford, Texas, and attended Stafford High School. He was selected in 18th round by the San Diego Padres in 2018 Major League Baseball draft, but opted not to sign with the team.

Smith played college baseball at Alabama for three seasons. He appeared in 13 games as a freshman and had an ERA of 6.48. Smith pitched 6 1/3 innings over four appearances with one start before the season ended prematurely due to the coronavirus pandemic. He became a starter prior to his junior season and went 2–8 with a 3.84 ERA with 113 strikeouts 20 walks in 98 1/3 innings pitched across 16 starts.

== Professional career ==
=== Detroit Tigers ===
Smith was drafted by the Detroit Tigers in the third round, with the 74th overall selection, of the 2021 Major League Baseball draft. Smith signed with the team on July 26, 2021, and received a $1,115,000 signing bonus. He made his professional debut in 2022, accumulating an 8-6 record and 3.77 ERA with 89 strikeouts across 22 games (21 starts) split between the Single-A Lakeland Flying Tigers and High-A West Michigan Whitecaps.

Smith split the 2023 season between the rookie-level Florida Complex League Tigers, West Michigan, and the Double-A Erie SeaWolves. He made 12 appearances (11 starts) for the three affiliates, posting a cumulative 1-2 record and 5.30 ERA with 38 strikeouts across 37 1/3 innings pitched. Smith made 14 appearances (13 starts) for West Michigan in 2024, compiling an 0-5 record and 4.40 ERA with 59 strikeouts across 57 1/3 innings pitched.

Smith split the beginning of the 2025 campaign between Double-A Erie and the Triple-A Toledo Mud Hens, recording a combined 1.80 ERA over his first 20 innings of work. On May 30, 2025, Smith was selected to the 40-man roster and promoted to the major leagues for the first time. He made his major league debut on June 2 against the Chicago White Sox, pitching two scoreless innings of relief. On July 2, Smith recorded his first career win after tossing 3 1/3 scoreless innings against the Washington Nationals. He made seven appearances for Detroit during his rookie campaign, recording a 1-0 record and 1.38 ERA with four strikeouts over 13 innings pitched.

Smith was optioned to Triple-A Toledo to begin the 2026 season. However, on March 25, 2026, Smith was designated for assignment by the Tigers.

=== San Francisco Giants ===
On March 30, 2026, Smith was traded to the San Francisco Giants in exchange for cash considerations. On June 7, Smith recorded his first career save, logging a perfect tenth inning in a 2–1 victory over the Chicago Cubs. He made 42 appearances out of the bullpen for San Francisco, posting an 0–6 record and 3.86 ERA with 45 strikeouts and four saves across 39 2/3 innings pitched.
