= Drew Sommers =

American baseball player (born 2000)

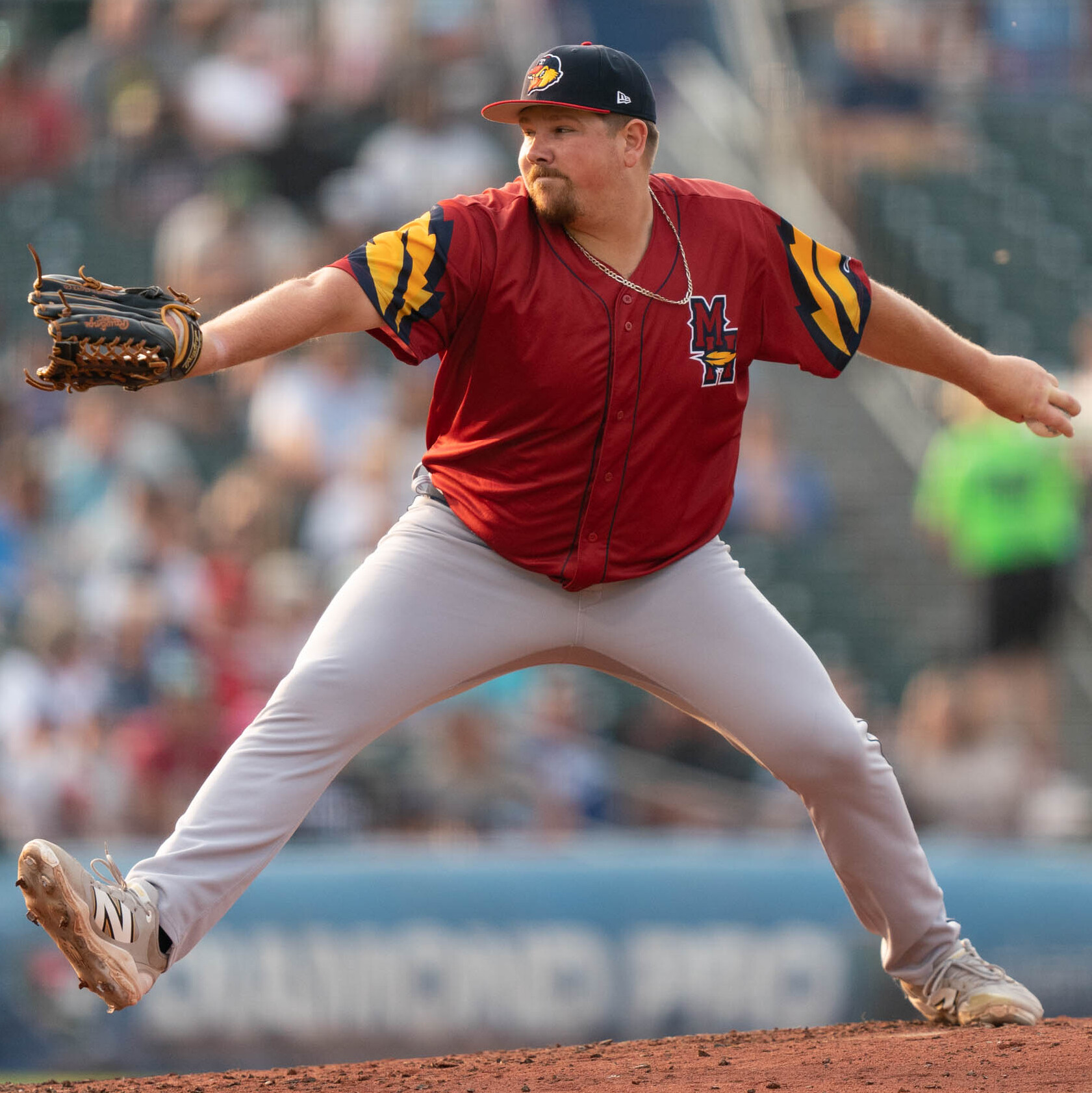
- Sommers with the Toledo Mud Hens in 2025

Detroit Tigers – No. 51
- Pitcher
- Born: August 14, 2000 (age 26); Hoffman Estates, Illinois, U.S.
- Bats: Left Throws: Left

MLB debut
- August 22, 2025, for the Detroit Tigers

MLB statistics (through 2026 season)
- Win–loss record: 2–5
- Earned run average: 4.64
- Strikeouts: 65
- Stats at Baseball Reference

Teams
- Detroit Tigers (2025–present)

Drew Gregory Sommers (born August 14, 2000) is an American professional baseball pitcher for the Detroit Tigers of Major League Baseball (MLB). He made his MLB debut in 2025.

== Career ==
=== Amateur ===
Sommers grew up in San Diego and graduated from Carlsbad High School. He played college baseball at San Diego State University and Central Arizona College. In 2022, he played collegiate summer baseball with the Falmouth Commodores of the Cape Cod Baseball League.

=== Tampa Bay Rays ===
Sommers was selected by the Tampa Bay Rays in the 11th round of the 2022 Major League Baseball draft. He made his professional debut in 2023 with the Single-A Charleston RiverDogs, accumulating a 1–4 record and 2.72 earned run average (ERA) with 66 strikeouts and eight saves across 32 appearances.

Sommers spent the 2024 season with the High-A Bowling Green Hot Rods. He made 41 appearances out of the bullpen for Bowling Green, registering a 6–3 record and 4.00 ERA with 65 strikeouts and two saves over 54 innings of work.

=== Detroit Tigers ===
On February 12, 2025, the Rays traded Sommers to the Detroit Tigers in exchange for Mason Englert. He began the season with the Double-A Erie SeaWolves, later receiving a promotion to the Triple-A Toledo Mud Hens. Sommers was promoted to the major leagues for the first time on August 22. He made four appearances for Detroit during his rookie campaign, struggling to an 0–1 record and 18.00 ERA with three strikeouts over three innings of work.

Sommers was optioned to Triple-A Toledo to begin the 2026 season. He was promoted to the major league club at the end of May. He earned his first major league win on August 25, 2026 with 1 2/3 perfect innings of relief against the team that drafted him, the Tampa Bay Rays. For the 2026 season, he made 43 appearances, all in relief, posting a 2–4 record and a 3.63 ERA, with 62 strikeouts in 39 2/3 innings (14.1 K/9).
