= Andrew Chafin =

American baseball player (born 1990)

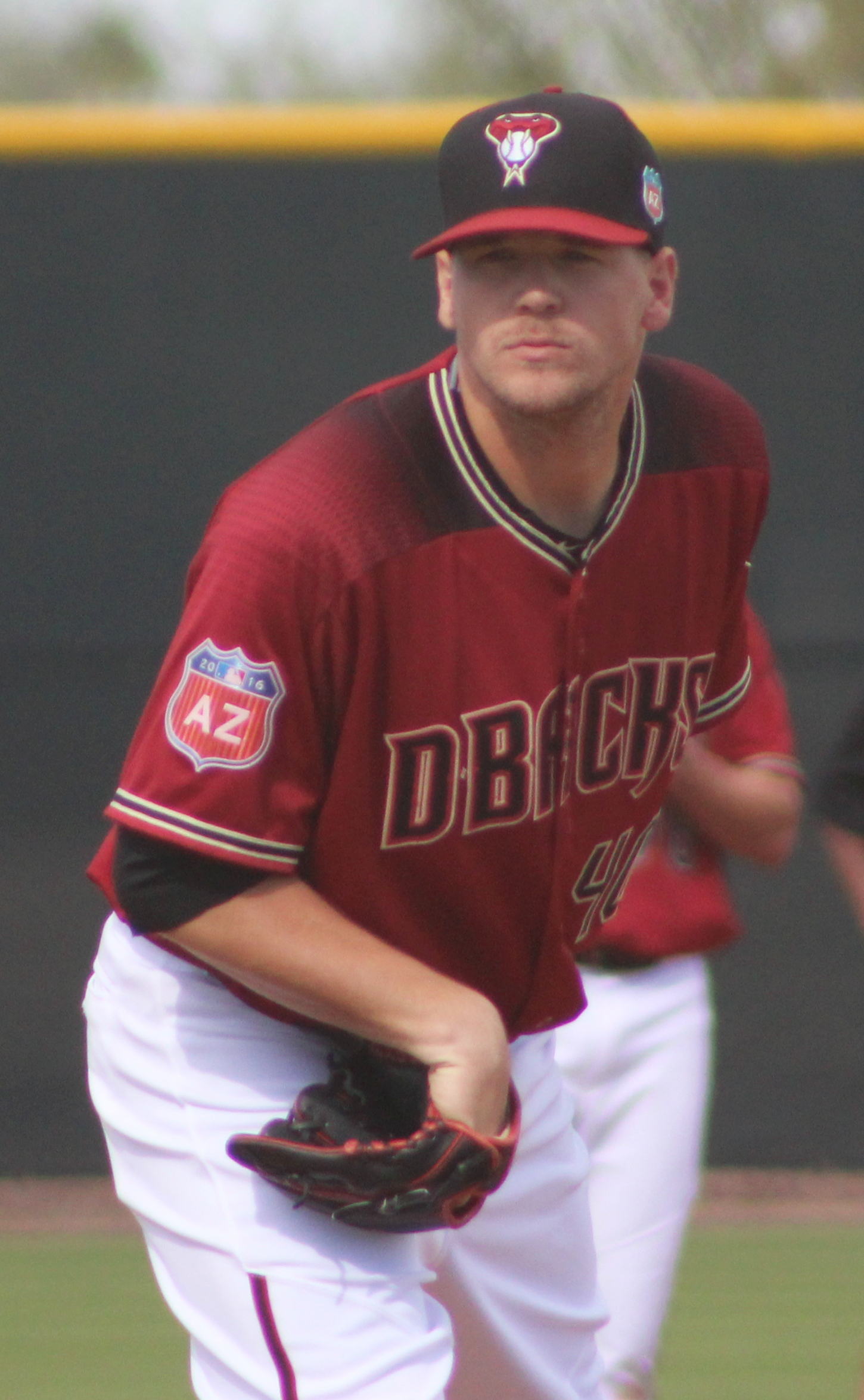
- Chafin with the Arizona Diamondbacks in 2016

Free agent
- Pitcher
- Born: June 17, 1990 (age 35); Kettering, Ohio, U.S.
- Bats: Right Throws: Left

MLB debut
- August 13, 2014, for the Arizona Diamondbacks

MLB statistics (through 2025 season)
- Win–loss record: 22–28
- Earned run average: 3.35
- Strikeouts: 591
- Stats at Baseball Reference

Teams
- Arizona Diamondbacks (2014–2020); Chicago Cubs (2020–2021); Oakland Athletics (2021); Detroit Tigers (2022); Arizona Diamondbacks (2023); Milwaukee Brewers (2023); Detroit Tigers (2024); Texas Rangers (2024); Washington Nationals (2025); Los Angeles Angels (2025)

Career highlights and awards
- Pitched a combined no-hitter on June 24, 2021

Andrew Gregory Chafin (born June 17, 1990), nicknamed "Big Country" and "the Sheriff", is an American professional baseball pitcher who is a free agent. He has previously played in Major League Baseball (MLB) for the Arizona Diamondbacks, Chicago Cubs, Oakland Athletics, Milwaukee Brewers, Texas Rangers, Detroit Tigers, Washington Nationals, and Los Angeles Angels.

== Amateur career ==
Chafin is from Wakeman, Ohio. He attended Western Reserve High School in Collins, Ohio, and played for the school's baseball team. He pitched a no-hitter in his final high school game.

Chafin attended Kent State University, and played college baseball for the Kent State Golden Flashes. As a freshman in 2009, he was the Mid-American Conference Freshman of the Year after he had a 1.26 earned run average (ERA), eight saves and 55 strikeouts over 35 2/3 innings pitched. In 2010, he underwent Tommy John surgery and missed the 2010 season. He returned in 2011 as a starter and had a 2.02 ERA with 105 strikeouts over 89 innings. After the 2011 season, he played collegiate summer baseball with the Orleans Firebirds of the Cape Cod Baseball League.

== Professional career ==
=== Arizona Diamondbacks ===
The Arizona Diamondbacks selected Chafin in the first round with the 43rd overall selection of the 2011 Major League Baseball draft. He made his professional debut for the Arizona League Diamondbacks, pitching in one game, recording two strikeouts over one inning. Pitching for the Visalia Rawhide in 2012, he recorded a 4.93 ERA with 150 strikeouts over 122 1/3. He started the 2013 season with Visalia and was promoted to the Mobile BayBears during the season. Overall, he had a 3.20 ERA and 119 strikeouts over 157 1/3.

Chafin made his Major League debut on August 13, 2014, against the Cleveland Indians at Progressive Field, pitching five innings allowing three hits, two walks, and three strikeouts, earning a no-decision. In his second start and first major league at-bat on September 17, 2014, for the Arizona Diamondbacks, he hit a run batted in single.

Chafin was converted into a reliever for the 2015 season, a season in which he finished 5–1 with a 2.76 ERA in 66 games for the D'Backs. In 2016, just like the majority of the pitching staff, Chafin struggled throughout the season, appearing in 32 games with a 6.75 ERA. Chafin bounced back the following season, being used now as a situational left hander out of the bullpen. In 71 games, he had a 3.51 ERA for the D'Backs.

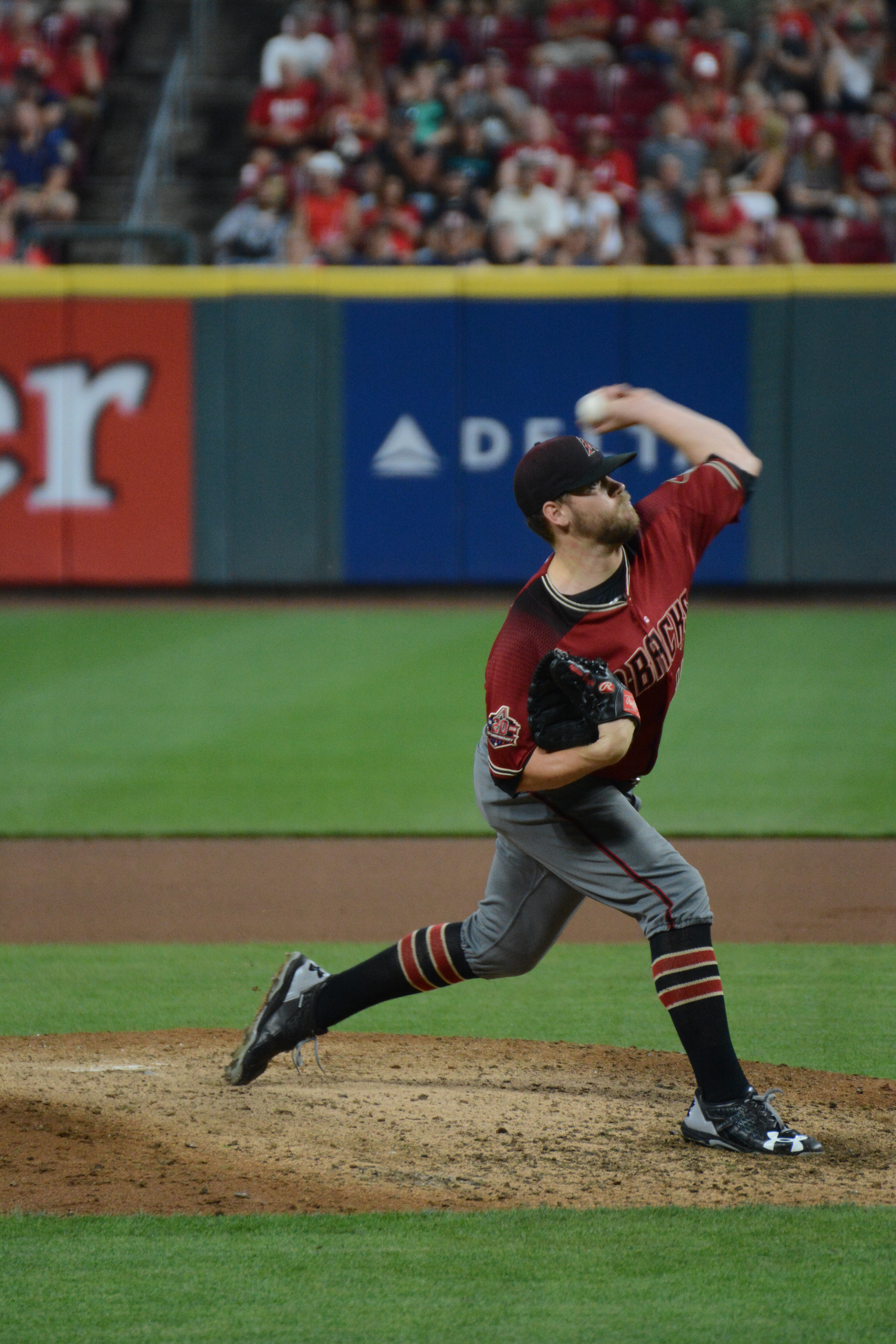
Chafin delivers a pitch for the Diamondbacks in 2018

In 2018, Chafin was continued to be used as a situational lefty out of the bullpen, pitching 49 1/3 innings. His record was 1–6 in a career high 77 games.

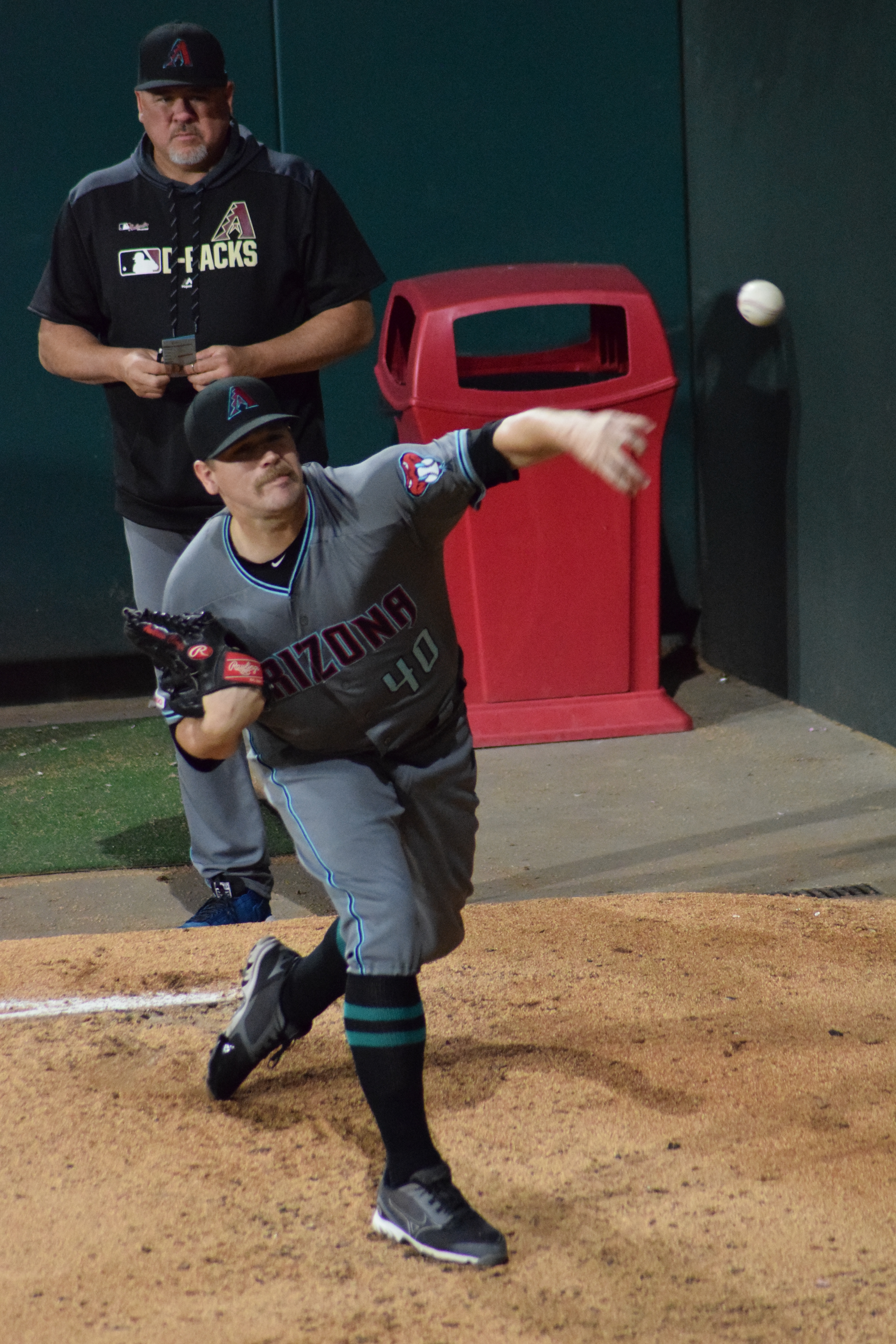
Chafin warming up in the bullpen in 2019

In 2019, Chafin appeared in 77 games for the second consecutive season, finishing with a record of 2–2 in 52 2/3 innings.. In 2020, with the new 3-batter rule, Chafin wasn't used solely as a left handed specialist and he struggled during the first half of the season with the team. In 11 games, he was 1–1 with a career worst 8.10 earned run average and 10 strikeouts in 6 2/3 innings pitched.

=== Chicago Cubs ===
Chafin was traded to the Chicago Cubs on August 31, 2020, the trade deadline of the shortened season, in exchange for Ronny Simon. Chafin pitched to a 3.00 ERA in 4 games with the Cubs to finish the year. Between both the Diamondbacks and Cubs, Chafin recorded a 6.52 earned run average and tallied 13 strikeouts in 9 2/3 innings pitched.

On February 2, 2021, Chafin re-signed with the Cubs on a one-year, $2.25 million contract that included a mutual option for 2022. On June 24, 2021, Chafin pitched a combined no-hitter against the Los Angeles Dodgers along with Zach Davies, Ryan Tepera, and Craig Kimbrel. In 43 appearances for the Cubs in 2021, Chafin recorded a 2.06 ERA with 37 strikeouts in 39 1/3 innings of work.

=== Oakland Athletics ===
On July 27, 2021, the Cubs traded Chafin to the Oakland Athletics in exchange for Greg Deichmann and Daniel Palencia. Between the two teams in 2021, Chafin pitched in 71 games, boasting a 1.83 ERA and 64 strikeouts in 68 2/3 innings.

=== Detroit Tigers ===
On March 17, 2022, Chafin signed a two-year, $13 million contract with the Detroit Tigers. On April 6 (retroactive to April 4), the Tigers placed Chafin on the 10-day injured list with a left groin strain. He made 64 appearances for the 2022 Tigers, posting 3 saves and a 2.83 ERA, with 67 strikeouts in 57 1/3 innings.

Chafin opted out of the second year of his Tigers contract on November 6, 2022, making him a free agent.

=== Arizona Diamondbacks (second stint) ===
On February 15, 2023, Chafin signed a one-year contract with the Arizona Diamondbacks. Chafin appeared in 43 games for the Diamondbacks, recording a 4.19 earned run average and 49 strikeouts in 34 1/3 innings pitched.

=== Milwaukee Brewers ===
On August 1, 2023, Chafin was traded to the Milwaukee Brewers in exchange for pitcher Peter Strzelecki. He became a free agent following the season.

Chafin appeared in 20 games for the Brewers recording a 5.82 earned run average and 14 strikeouts in 17 innings pitched. Between both the Diamondbacks and Brewers, Chafin appeared in 63 games, finishing with a 4.73 earned run average and 63 strikeouts across 51 1/3 innings.

=== Detroit Tigers (second stint) ===
On December 12, 2023, Chafin signed with the Tigers on a one-year, $4.25 million contract that included a club option for 2025. In 41 appearances for the Tigers in 2024, Chafin recorded a 3.16 ERA with 50 strikeouts across 37 innings pitched.

=== Texas Rangers ===
On July 30, 2024, Chafin was traded to the Texas Rangers in exchange for Chase Lee and Joseph Montalvo. In 21 appearances with the Rangers, he posted a 1-1 record, a 4.19 ERA, and struck out 20 batters in 19 1/3 innings pitched. On November 4, the Rangers declined his option for the 2025 season making him a free agent.

=== Detroit Tigers (third stint) ===
On February 24, 2025, Chafin signed a minor league contract with the Detroit Tigers. In 13 appearances for the Triple-A Toledo Mud Hens, he posted a 2-0 record and 2.13 ERA with 17 strikeouts across 12 2/3 innings pitched. Chafin was released by the Tigers organization on April 30.

=== Washington Nationals ===
On May 1, 2025, Chafin signed a one-year, $1 million contract with the Washington Nationals. Chafin appeared in 26 games for the Nationals, recording a 2.70 earned run average and 18 strikeouts in 20 innings pitched.

=== Los Angeles Angels ===
On July 30, 2025, the Nationals traded Chafin and Luis García to the Los Angeles Angels in exchange for Jake Eder and Sam Brown. Chafin made 16 appearances for Los Angeles, recording a 1.98 ERA with 18 strikeouts across 13 2/3 innings pitched.

=== Cincinnati Reds ===
On February 14, 2026, Chafin signed a minor league contract with the Minnesota Twins. He was released by Minnesota prior to the start of the regular season on March 20.

On March 27, 2026, Chafin signed a minor league contract with the Cincinnati Reds. He made 10 appearances for the Triple-A Louisville Bats, recording an 0.96 ERA with eight strikeouts and one save across 9 1/3 innings pitched. On May 4, Chafin triggered an opt-out clause in his contract and became a free agent.

== Pitch selection ==
Chafin throws a four-seam fastball and a two-seam sinking fastball that each average 92 to 94 MPH (topping out at 97 MPH). His main offspeed pitch is a mid-80s slider.

== Personal life ==
Chafin and his wife, Shelbi, have two daughters and a son. They live on a farm near Massillon, Ohio.

Awards and achievements
Preceded by Corey Kluber	No-hit game June 24, 2021 (with Davies, Tepera & Kimbrel)	Succeeded by Tyler Gilbert
