= 2023 Oakland Athletics season =

Major League Baseball season

2023 Oakland Athletics
- League: American League
- Division: West
- Ballpark: Oakland Coliseum
- City: Oakland, California
- Record: 50–112 (.309)
- Divisional place: 5th
- Owners: John Fisher
- General managers: David Forst
- Managers: Mark Kotsay
- Television: NBC Sports California (Glen Kuiper [through May 5], Johnny Doskow, Vince Cotroneo, Dallas Braden)
- Radio: KNEW; Oakland Athletics Radio Network (Ken Korach, Vince Cotroneo, Johnny Doskow)

The 2023 season was the 123rd season for the Oakland Athletics franchise, and the 56th in Oakland. The Athletics failed to improve on their 60–102 record from the previous season, going 50–112. They started 10–45 in their first 55 games, which tied them with the 1904 Washington Senators and 1899 Cleveland Spiders for the worst 55-game start in MLB history and with a 21–60 first half, were on pace to tie (and at some points in the season, break) the record for most losses in a season in the modern era set by the 1962 Mets before having a 29–52 second half to avoid breaking the record.

With their loss on August 8, the Athletics became the fastest team to be guaranteed a losing season since the 2003 Detroit Tigers, who lost 82 of their first 111 games. Despite the MLB adding an additional wild card spot to its playoff field, the Athletics, on August 23, after their loss to the Kansas City Royals, were eliminated from postseason contention, becoming the first team eliminated, as well as the fastest playoff elimination since the 2018 Baltimore Orioles, who were eliminated from playoff contention on August 20, 2018 which was surpassed next season by the 2024 Chicago White Sox.

Although the Athletics showed signs of improvement in the second half of the season, they still became the first team since the 2019 Detroit Tigers to lose 111 or more games, en route to finishing 50–112. The A's finished last or close to last in the American League and in MLB in most batting and pitching categories this season.

The Oakland Athletics drew an average home attendance of 10,275 in 81 home games in the 2023 MLB season. The total attendance was 832,352.

== Offseason ==
=== Coaching changes ===
On November 7, 2022, the Athletics announced that bench coach Brad Ausmus would not return for the 2023 season. On November 28, the club announced that Darren Bush would be promoted from third base coach to bench coach. The A's also announced that Eric Martins would move over from first base coach to third base, as Mike Aldrete takes over as first base coach. Oakland also named Mike McCarthy as bullpen coach.

=== Rule changes ===
Pursuant to the CBA, new rule changes will be in place for the 2023 season:

- institution of a pitch clock between pitches;
- limits on pickoff attempts per plate appearance;
- limits on defensive shifts requiring two infielders to be on either side of second and be within the boundary of the infield; and
- larger bases (increased to 18-inch squares);

=== Transactions ===
==== October 2022 ====
October 6	Activated RHPs Collin Wiles, Zack Jackson and Joel Payamps from the 15-day IL. Activated LHP Sam Moll from the 15-day IL. Activated CF Joel Payamps from the 10-day IL. Activated 3B Vimael Machín from the paternity list. Recalled LHP Zach Logue, OFs Cody Thomas and Cal Stevenson, 1B David MacKinnon and SS Kevin Smith from Las Vegas Aviators. Recalled RHP Luis Medina from Midland Rockhounds.

==== November 2022 ====
November 3	Sent LHP Sam Selman, RHPs Norge Ruiz, Austin Pruitt and Collin Wiles, and 2B Nate Mondou outright to Las Vegas Aviators. Claimed 2B Yonny Hernandez off waivers from Arizona Diamondbacks. Signed free agent 1B Kevin Cron to a minor league contract.
November 6	C Stephen Vogt and LF Chad Pinder elected free agency.
November 8	Activated RHPs Paul Blackburn, Deolis Guerra, Daulton Jefferies and Dany Jimenez from the 60-day injured list.
November 14	Signed free agent CF Trenton Brooks, 3B Pablo Reyes, and RHP Rico Garcia to minor league contracts. Sent RHP Daulton Jefferies outright to Las Vegas Aviators.
November 15	Selected the contract of LHP Hogan Harris from the Las Vegas Aviators and the contract of Lawrence Butler from the Lansing Lugnuts.
November 17	Claimed OF Brent Rooker off of waivers from the Kansas City Royals.
November 18	LHP Jared Koenig, RHP Deolis Guerra and 1B David MacKinnon elected free agency.
November 22	Signed free agent RHP Jasseel De La Cruz to a minor league contract.

==== December 2022 ====
December 6	Acquired RHP Chad Smith from the Colorado Rockies for RHP Jeff Criswell.
December 7	Claimed 1B Ryan Noda off of waivers from the Oklahoma City Dodgers.
December 12	Acquired RHPs Freddy Tarnok and Royber Salinas, C Manny Piña, 2B Esteury Ruiz and LHP Kyle Muller from the Atlanta Braves for C Sean Murphy. Designated 3B Vimael Machin for assignment. Signed free agent RHP Deolis Guerra to a minor league contract.
December 13	Signed free agent 2B Jace Peterson to a 2-year, $9.5 million contract and SS Aledmys Diaz to a 2-year, $14.5 million contract.
December 14	Signed LHP Garrett Williams and RHP Brayan Polanco to a minor league contract. Designated 2B's Ernie Clement and Yonny Hernandez for assignment.
December 15	Acquired cash from the Los Angeles Dodgers in exchange for 2B Yonny Hernandez.
December 16	Signed free agent RHP Trevor May at a 1-year, $7 million contract. Designated CF Cody Thomas for assignment. Sent 2B Ernie Clement and 3B Vimael Machin outright to Las Vegas Aviators.
December 20	Signed free agent LHP Jake Fishman and 2B Tyler Wade to a minor league contract and invited them to spring training. Sent CF Cody Thomas outright to Las Vegas Aviators. Invited non-roster RHP's J.T. Ginn, Mason Miller, Daulton Jeffries, Norge Ruiz, 2B Ernie Clement, 3B Zack Gelof, SS's Logan Davidson and Max Muncy, C's Daniel Susac, Kyle McCann and Tyler Soderstrom, CF Cody Thomas and OF Denzel Clarke.
December 21	Signed free agent RHP Drew Rucinski to a 1-year, $3 million contract.
December 22	Designated LHP Zach Logue for assignment.
December 23	LHP Zach Logue claimed off of waivers by the Detroit Tigers.

==== January 2023 ====
January 10	Signed free agent RHP Austin Pruitt to a minor league contract.
January 11	Signed free agent RHP Joe Wieland to a minor league contract.
January 13	Designated RHP Tyler Cyr for assignment. Signed free agent RHP Shintaro Fujinami to a 1-year, $3.25 million contract.
January 15	Signed free agent RHP's Alvin Veras, Roberto Urdaneta, Donny Troconis, Luis Morales, Freilyn Guzman, Francis Marte, Paul Chacon, Cristhian Rangel and Wilfred Alvarado, C's Jesus Natera and Ramon Landaeta, SS's Jesus Superlano and Jesus Fernandez, OF's Darling Fernandez, Reynaldo De La Paz and Jeison Lopez to a minor league contract.
January 17	Released RHP Tyler Cyr.
January 26	Traded LHP Cole Irvin and RHP Kyle Virbitsky to the Baltimore Orioles for SS Darell Hernaiz.
January 27	Signed free agent 1B Jesus Aguilar to a 1-year, $3 million contract.

==== February 2023 ====
February 11	Traded LHP A.J. Puk to the Miami Marlins for OF JJ Bleday. Signed free agent RHP Drew Steckenrider to a minor league contract.
February 13	Signed free agent 1B Greg Deichmann to a minor league contract.
February 16	Signed free agent 3B Jonah Bride to a minor league contract.
February 24	Signed free agent RHP Frarlyn Martinez to a minor league contract.
February 25	Assigned RHP's Garrett Acton, Bryce Conley and Joe Wieland, and LHP Austin Briggs to Oakland Athletics.
February 26	Assigned RHP's Hunter Breault, Chase Cohen, Calvin Coker and Charles Hall to Oakland Athletics.
February 27	Assigned RHP's Michael Danielak and Trayson Kubo to Oakland Athletics.

==== March 2023 ====
March 2	Assigned 2B Cooper Bowman to Oakland Athletics.
March 5	Assigned SS Darell Hernaiz, C William Simoneit and 1B Greg Deichmann to Oakland Athletics.
March 6	Optioned RHP Luis Medina and OF Cal Stevenson to Las Vegas Aviators.
March 9	Assigned SS Jeremy Eierman to Oakland Athletics.
March 10	Assigned CF Austin Beck to Oakland Athletics. Optioned RHP Adrián Martínez to Las Vegas Aviators.
March 11	Assigned RHP Ryan Cusick to Oakland Athletics.
March 12	Assigned RHP Parker Dunshee to Oakland Athletics. Optioned 3B's Jordan Díaz, Jonah Bride and Dermis Garcia and OF JJ Bleday to Las Vegas Aviators. Optioned 1B Lawrence Butler to Midland Rockhounds.
March 13	Assigned CF Brayan Buelvas to Oakland Athletics.
March 16	Assigned C Shane McGuire and SS Jose Escorche to Oakland Athletics.
March 17	Assigned RHP Brian Howard, C C.J. Rodriguez, SS Sahid Venezuela and OF Devin Foyle to Oakland Athletics.
March 18	Assigned OF Junior Perez to Oakland Athletics.
March 19	Signed free agent C Carlos Pérez to a minor league contract. Assigned SS's Nelson Beltran and Jack Winkler to Oakland Athletics.
March 23	Assigned C Carlos Pérez and SS Dereck Salom to Oakland Athletics.
March 24	Assigned RHP's Vince Reilly, Joelvis Del Rosario and Shohei Tomioka, LHP Kumar Nambiar and OF Caeden Trenkle to Oakland Athletics.
March 25	Assigned RHP Blaze Pontes to Oakland Athletics.
March 26	Signed free agent RHP Jeurys Familia to a one-year contract. Placed LHP Kirby Snead on the 60-day injured list (left shoulder strain).
March 28	Optioned RHP Chad Smith and SS Kevin Smith to Las Vegas Aviators.
March 29	Traded CF Cristian Pache to Philadelphia Phillies for RHP Billy Sullivan. Signed free agent RHP Colton Eastman to a minor league contract.

== Regular season ==
=== Game log ===
Legend
Athletics Win	Athletics Loss	Game postponed / Tie	Eliminated from playoff race

2023 Game Log
Total: 50–112 (Home: 26–55; Away: 24–57)
March/April: 6–23 (Home: 3–12; Away: 3–11)

#	Date	Opponent	Score	Win	Loss	Save	Stadium	Attendance	Record	Streak
1	March 30	Angels	2–1	May (1–0)	Loup (0–1)	Jiménez (1)	Oakland Coliseum	26,805	1–0	W1
2	April 1	Angels	1–13	Sandoval (1–0)	Fujinami (0–1)	Davidson (1)	Oakland Coliseum	15,757	1–1	L1
3	April 2	Angels	0–6	Anderson (1–0)	Waldichuk (0–1)	—	Oakland Coliseum	14,638	1–2	L2
4	April 3	Guardians	11–12 (10)	Clase (1–0)	May (1–1)	Morgan (1)	Oakland Coliseum	3,035	1–3	L3
5	April 4	Guardians	4–3	May (2–1)	Karinchak (0–2)	—	Oakland Coliseum	3,407	2–3	W1
6	April 5	Guardians	4–6 (10)	Morgan (1–0)	Jackson (0–1)	Clase (2)	Oakland Coliseum	4,930	2–4	L1
7	April 7	@ Rays	5–9	Eflin (2–0)	Waldichuk (0–2)	—	Tropicana Field	15,980	2–5	L2
8	April 8	@ Rays	0–11	Springs (2–0)	Fujinami (0–2)	—	Tropicana Field	15,880	2–6	L3
9	April 9	@ Rays	0–11	Rasmussen (2–0)	Kaprielian (0–1)	—	Tropicana Field	11,159	2–7	L4
10	April 10	@ Orioles	1–5	Gibson (3–0)	Sears (0–1)	—	Camden Yards	9,322	2–8	L5
11	April 11	@ Orioles	8–12	Baker (1–0)	Moll (0–1)	—	Camden Yards	12,305	2–9	L6
12	April 12	@ Orioles	8–4	Smith (1–0)	Akin (0–1)	—	Camden Yards	10,181	3–9	W1
13	April 13	@ Orioles	7–8	Bautista (1–1)	May (2–2)	—	Camden Yards	11,665	3–10	L1
14	April 14	Mets	6–17	Santana (1–0)	Kaprielian (0–2)	—	Oakland Coliseum	11,102	3–11	L2
15	April 15	Mets	2–3	Smith (1–0)	Fujinami (0–3)	Robertson (3)	Oakland Coliseum	12,967	3–12	L3
16	April 16	Mets	3–4 (10)	Yacabonis (1–0)	Moll (0–2)	Robertson (4)	Oakland Coliseum	17,645	3–13	L4
17	April 17	Cubs	1–10	Wesneski (1–0)	Muller (0–1)	—	Oakland Coliseum	4,714	3–14	L5
18	April 18	Cubs	0–4	Leiter Jr. (1–0)	May (2–3)	—	Oakland Coliseum	5,196	3–15	L6
19	April 19	Cubs	2–12	Steele (3–0)	Smith (1–1)	—	Oakland Coliseum	12,112	3–16	L7
20	April 21	@ Rangers	5–4	Jackson (1–1)	Smith (0–1)	Familia (1)	Globe Life Field	28,775	4–16	W1
21	April 22	@ Rangers	3–18	Heaney (2–1)	Fujinami (0–4)	—	Globe Life Field	32,388	4–17	L1
22	April 23	@ Rangers	2–5	deGrom (2–0)	Muller (0–2)	Smith (2)	Globe Life Field	34,916	4–18	L2
23	April 24	@ Angels	11–10 (10)	Oller (1–0)	Barría (1–1)	Familia (2)	Angel Stadium	23,814	5–18	W1
24	April 25	@ Angels	3–5	Canning (1–0)	Miller (0–1)	Estévez (4)	Angel Stadium	26,971	5–19	L1
25	April 26	@ Angels	3–11	Sandoval (2–1)	Medina (0–1)	—	Angel Stadium	24,524	5–20	L2
26	April 27	@ Angels	7–8	Ohtani (4–0)	Sears (0–2)	Estévez (5)	Angel Stadium	21,741	5–21	L3
27	April 28	Reds	7–11	Cessa (1–3)	Rucinski (0–1)	—	Oakland Coliseum	6,423	5–22	L4
28	April 29	Reds	2–3	Legumina (1–0)	Familia (0–1)	Díaz (4)	Oakland Coliseum	7,052	5–23	L5
29	April 30	Reds	5–4	Jackson (2–1)	Law (0–4)	—	Oakland Coliseum	18,271	6–23	W1

May: 6–23 (Home: 4–12; Away: 2–11)

#	Date	Opponent	Score	Win	Loss	Save	Stadium	Attendance	Record	Streak
30	May 2	Mariners	1–2	Speier (1–0)	Lovelady (0–1)	Sewald (8)	Oakland Coliseum	2,583	6–24	L1
31	May 3	Mariners	2–7 (10)	Brash (3–2)	Oller (1–1)	—	Oakland Coliseum	2,685	6–25	L2
32	May 4	Mariners	3–5	Kirby (3–2)	Rucinski (0–2)	Sewald (9)	Oakland Coliseum	13,025	6–26	L3
33	May 5	@ Royals	12–8	Muller (1–2)	Keller (2–3)	—	Kauffman Stadium	15,966	7–26	W1
34	May 6	@ Royals	5–4	Waldichuk (1–2)	Singer (2–4)	Jackson (1)	Kauffman Stadium	29,549	8–26	W2
35	May 7	@ Royals	1–5	Yarbrough (1–4)	Miller (0–2)	—	Kauffman Stadium	12,740	8–27	L1
36	May 8	@ Yankees	2–7	Marinaccio (2–1)	Sears (0–3)	—	Yankee Stadium	33,011	8–28	L2
37	May 9	@ Yankees	5–10	Schmidt (1–3)	Rucinski (0–3)	—	Yankee Stadium	33,569	8–29	L3
38	May 10	@ Yankees	3–11	Cordero (2–1)	Muller (1–3)	García (1)	Yankee Stadium	40,687	8–30	L4
39	May 11	Rangers	0–4	Eovaldi (5–2)	Medina (0–2)	Smith (7)	Oakland Coliseum	2,949	8–31	L5
40	May 12	Rangers	9–7 (10)	Fujinami (1–4)	Burke (2–1)	—	Oakland Coliseum	6,575	9–31	W1
41	May 13	Rangers	0–5	Gray (3–1)	Kaprielian (0–3)	—	Oakland Coliseum	8,230	9–32	L1
42	May 14	Rangers	3–11	Hernández (1–1)	Pruitt (0–1)	—	Oakland Coliseum	7,793	9–33	L2
43	May 15	Diamondbacks	2–5	Kelly (4–3)	Rucinski (0–4)	Chafin (6)	Oakland Coliseum	2,064	9–34	L3
44	May 16	Diamondbacks	9–8 (12)	Pruitt (1–1)	McGough (0–4)	—	Oakland Coliseum	3,261	10–34	W1
45	May 17	Diamondbacks	3–5	Ruiz (1–0)	Fujinami (1–5)	Castro (3)	Oakland Coliseum	4,159	10–35	L1
46	May 19	@ Astros	1–5	Bielak (1–1)	Waldichuk (1–3)	—	Minute Maid Park	34,931	10–36	L2
47	May 20	@ Astros	2–3	Neris (3–1)	Lovelady (0–2)	Pressly (8)	Minute Maid Park	35,475	10–37	L3
48	May 21	@ Astros	0–2	Valdez (4–4)	Kaprielian (0–4)	—	Minute Maid Park	39,820	10–38	L4
49	May 22	@ Mariners	2–11	Castillo (3–2)	Muller (1–4)	—	T-Mobile Park	15,418	10–39	L5
50	May 23	@ Mariners	2–3	Gonzales (4–1)	Medina (0–3)	Sewald (10)	T-Mobile Park	15,646	10–40	L6
51	May 24	@ Mariners	1–6	Miller (3–1)	Waldichuk (1–4)	—	T-Mobile Park	14,899	10–41	L7
52	May 25	@ Mariners	2–3	Gilbert (3–2)	Lovelady (0–3)	Sewald (11)	T-Mobile Park	19,268	10–42	L8
53	May 26	Astros	2–5	Brown (5–1)	Kaprielian (0–5)	Pressly (9)	Oakland Coliseum	13,345	10–43	L9
54	May 27	Astros	3–6	Valdez (5–4)	Pruitt (1–2)	Pressly (10)	Oakland Coliseum	9,293	10–44	L10
55	May 28	Astros	1–10	Javier (6–1)	Medina (0–4)	—	Oakland Coliseum	8,809	10–45	L11
56	May 29	Braves	7–2	Erceg (1–0)	Soroka (0–1)	—	Oakland Coliseum	8,556	11–45	W1
57	May 30	Braves	2–1	Fujinami (2–5)	Iglesias (1–2)	—	Oakland Coliseum	5,116	12–45	W2
58	May 31	Braves	2–4	Shuster (2–2)	Kaprielian (0–6)	Iglesias (5)	Oakland Coliseum	6,429	12–46	L1

June: 10–16 (Home: 4–7; Away: 6–9)

#	Date	Opponent	Score	Win	Loss	Save	Stadium	Attendance	Record	Streak
59	June 2	@ Marlins	0–4	Cabrera (4–4)	Fujinami (2–6)	—	LoanDepot Park	8,582	12–47	L2
60	June 3	@ Marlins	1–12	Pérez (3–1)	Medina (0–5)	Soriano (1)	LoanDepot Park	10,649	12–48	L3
61	June 4	@ Marlins	5–7	Scott (4–1)	Pruitt (1–3)	Floro (6)	LoanDepot Park	12,507	12–49	L4
62	June 5	@ Pirates	4–5	Perdomo (1–0)	Moll (0–3)	Holderman (1)	PNC Park	11,566	12–50	L5
63	June 6	@ Pirates	11–2	Kaprielian (1–6)	Keller (7–2)	—	PNC Park	13,691	13–50	W1
64	June 7	@ Pirates	9–5	Harris (1–0)	Contreras (3–5)	May (1)	PNC Park	14,550	14–50	W2
65	June 9	@ Brewers	5–2	Medina (1–5)	Houser (2–2)	May (2)	American Family Field	30,657	15–50	W3
66	June 10	@ Brewers	2–1 (10)	Fujinami (3–6)	Payamps (2–1)	Long (1)	American Family Field	35,157	16–50	W4
67	June 11	@ Brewers	8–6	Sears (1–3)	Peralta (5–6)	Long (2)	American Family Field	31,363	17–50	W5
68	June 12	Rays	4–3	Kaprielian (2–6)	Eflin (8–2)	Waldichuk (1)	Oakland Coliseum	4,848	18–50	W6
69	June 13	Rays	2–1	Harris (2–0)	Poche (4–2)	May (3)	Oakland Coliseum	27,759	19–50	W7
70	June 14	Rays	3–6	Glasnow (2–0)	Medina (1–6)	Adam (11)	Oakland Coliseum	7,055	19–51	L1
71	June 15	Rays	3–4	Stephenson (1–3)	Pruitt (1–4)	Fairbanks (6)	Oakland Coliseum	7,133	19–52	L2
72	June 16	Phillies	1–6	Walker (7–3)	Sears (1–4)	—	Oakland Coliseum	16,084	19–53	L3
73	June 17	Phillies	2–3 (12)	Vasquez (2–0)	Waldichuk (1–5)	Hoffman (1)	Oakland Coliseum	12,015	19–54	L4
74	June 18	Phillies	2–3	Wheeler (6–4)	Harris (2–1)	Marte (1)	Oakland Coliseum	24,326	19–55	L5
75	June 20	@ Guardians	2–3 (10)	De Los Santos (3–1)	May (2–4)	—	Progressive Field	17,773	19–56	L6
76	June 21	@ Guardians	6–7	Morgan (3–1)	Pruitt (1–5)	Clase (22)	Progressive Field	17,853	19–57	L7
77	June 22	@ Guardians	1–6	Sandlin (3–3)	Sears (1–5)	—	Progressive Field	23,969	19–58	L8
78	June 23	@ Blue Jays	5–4	Erceg (2–0)	Romano (3–3)	May (4)	Rogers Centre	34,988	20–58	W1
79	June 24	@ Blue Jays	3–7	Berríos (8–5)	Fujinami (3–7)	Romano (23)	Rogers Centre	41,720	20–59	L1
80	June 25	@ Blue Jays	1–12	Kikuchi (7–2)	Medina (1–7)	—	Rogers Centre	41,069	20–60	L2
81	June 27	Yankees	2–1	Blackburn (1–0)	Brito (4–4)	Moll (1)	Oakland Coliseum	13,050	21–60	W1
82	June 28	Yankees	0–11	Germán (5–5)	Sears (1–6)	—	Oakland Coliseum	12,479	21–61	L1
83	June 29	Yankees	4–10	Schmidt (3–6)	Harris (2–2)	—	Oakland Coliseum	14,178	21–62	L2
84	June 30	White Sox	7–4	Medina (2–7)	Banks (0–3)	May (5)	Oakland Coliseum	14,181	22–62	W1

July: 8–15 (Home: 4–8; Away: 4–7)

#	Date	Opponent	Score	Win	Loss	Save	Stadium	Attendance	Record	Streak
85	July 1	White Sox	7–6 (10)	Fujinami (4–7)	Graveman (3–4)	—	Oakland Coliseum	9,235	23–62	W2
86	July 2	White Sox	7–8	Bummer (3–1)	Blackburn (1–1)	Santos (1)	Oakland Coliseum	12,107	23–63	L1
87	July 4	@ Tigers	1–0 (10)	Fujinami (5–7)	Holton (0–1)	May (6)	Comerica Park	26,749	24–63	W1
88	July 5	@ Tigers	12–3	Waldichuk (2–5)	Rodríguez (4–5)	—	Comerica Park	15,149	25–63	W2
89	July 6	@ Tigers	0–9	Lorenzen (3–6)	Harris (2–3)	—	Comerica Park	15,133	25–64	L1
90	July 7	@ Red Sox	3–7	Pivetta (5–5)	Long (0–1)	—	Fenway Park	31,157	25–65	L2
91	July 8	@ Red Sox	3–10	Paxton (5–1)	Pruitt (1–6)	Walter (1)	Fenway Park	34,087	25–66	L3
92	July 9	@ Red Sox	3–4	Martin (3–1)	Waldichuk (2–6)	Jansen (19)	Fenway Park	35,460	25–67	L4
–	July 11	93rd All-Star Game in Seattle, WA								
93	July 14	Twins	4–5	Jax (5–6)	Fujinami (5–8)	Durán (13)	Oakland Coliseum	7,923	25–68	L5
94	July 15	Twins	7–10	Morán (2–2)	Tarnok (0–1)	Durán (14)	Oakland Coliseum	10,534	25–69	L6
95	July 16	Twins	4–5	López (3–2)	Erceg (2–1)	Durán (15)	Oakland Coliseum	9,335	25–70	L7
96	July 17	Red Sox	0–7	Pivetta (6–5)	Blackburn (1–2)	—	Oakland Coliseum	9,987	25–71	L8
97	July 18	Red Sox	3–0	Medina (3–7)	Jacques (1–1)	May (7)	Oakland Coliseum	10,115	26–71	W1
98	July 19	Red Sox	6–5	Felipe (1–0)	Bello (7–6)	May (8)	Oakland Coliseum	15,023	27–71	W2
99	July 20	Astros	1–3	France (5–3)	Harris (2–4)	Pressly (22)	Oakland Coliseum	4,757	27–72	L1
100	July 21	Astros	4–6	Valdez (8–6)	Sears (1–7)	Pressly (23)	Oakland Coliseum	6,810	27–73	L2
101	July 22	Astros	4–1	Pruitt (2–6)	Javier (7–2)	May (9)	Oakland Coliseum	14,507	28–73	W1
102	July 23	Astros	2–3	Neris (6–2)	Smith (1–2)	Abreu (3)	Oakland Coliseum	11,231	28–74	L1
103	July 25	@ Giants	1–2	Rogers (4–4)	Erceg (2–2)	Doval (31)	Oracle Park	40,014	28–75	L2
104	July 26	@ Giants	3–8	Wood (5–4)	Harris (2–5)	—	Oracle Park	36,142	28–76	L3
105	July 28	@ Rockies	8–5	Sears (2–7)	Freeland (4–11)	May (10)	Coors Field	37,262	29–76	W1
106	July 29	@ Rockies	11–3	Blackburn (2–2)	Flexen (0–5)	—	Coors Field	45,085	30–76	W2
107	July 30	@ Rockies	0–2	Blach (1–0)	Medina (3–8)	Lawrence (8)	Coors Field	31,789	30–77	L1

August: 9–18 (Home: 5–6; Away: 4–12)

#	Date	Opponent	Score	Win	Loss	Save	Stadium	Attendance	Record	Streak
108	August 1	@ Dodgers	3–7	Lynn (7–9)	Waldichuk (2–7)	—	Dodger Stadium	44,207	30–78	L2
109	August 2	@ Dodgers	1–10	Gonsolin (6–4)	Harris (2–6)	—	Dodger Stadium	47,711	30–79	L3
110	August 3	@ Dodgers	2–8	Urías (8–6)	Sears (2–8)	Sheehan (1)	Dodger Stadium	52,624	30–80	L4
111	August 5	Giants	2–1	May (3–4)	Walker (4–1)	—	Oakland Coliseum	37,553	31–80	W1
112	August 6	Giants	8–6	Snead (1–0)	Jackson (1–1)	May (11)	Oakland Coliseum	27,381	32–80	W2
113	August 7	Rangers	3–5	Sborz (5–4)	Jiménez (0–1)	Smith (21)	Oakland Coliseum	4,013	32–81	L1
114	August 8	Rangers	1–6	Scherzer (11–4)	Sears (2–9)	—	Oakland Coliseum	5,419	32–82	L2
115	August 9	Rangers	2–0	Tarnok (1–1)	Montgomery (7–11)	May (12)	Oakland Coliseum	6,372	33–82	W1
116	August 11	@ Nationals	2–8	Abbott (1–1)	Blackburn (2–3)	—	Nationals Park	22,651	33–83	L1
117	August 12	@ Nationals	2–3	Finnegan (6–3)	Erceg (2–3)	—	Nationals Park	28,635	33–84	L2
118	August 13	@ Nationals	7–8	La Sorsa (1–0)	Snead (1–1)	—	Nationals Park	19,240	33–85	L3
119	August 14	@ Cardinals	5–7	Romero (3–1)	Felipe (1–1)	—	Busch Stadium	34,793	33–86	L4
120	August 15	@ Cardinals	2–6	Hudson (4–0)	Watkins (0–1)	—	Busch Stadium	32,528	33–87	L5
121	August 16	@ Cardinals	8–0	Blackburn (3–3)	Liberatore (2–5)	—	Busch Stadium	33,146	34–87	W1
122	August 18	Orioles	4–9	Gibson (12–7)	Pérez (0–1)	—	Oakland Coliseum	8,492	34–88	L1
123	August 19	Orioles	2–7 (10)	Bautista (8–2)	Martínez (0–1)	—	Oakland Coliseum	18,213	34–89	L2
124	August 20	Orioles	1–12	Bradish (8–6)	Sears (2–10)	—	Oakland Coliseum	16,198	34–90	L3
125	August 21	Royals	6–4	May (4–4)	Coleman (0–2)	—	Oakland Coliseum	3,095	35–90	W1
126	August 22	Royals	5–4	Harris (3–6)	Zerpa (1–2)	May (13)	Oakland Coliseum	4,021	36–90	W2
127	August 23	Royals	0–4	Ragans (5–4)	Martínez (0–2)	Hernández (3)	Oakland Coliseum	5,075	36–91	L1
128	August 24	@ White Sox	8–5	Erceg (3–3)	Lambert (2–3)	May (14)	Guaranteed Rate Field	13,247	37–91	W1
129	August 25	@ White Sox	12–4	Neal (1–0)	Cease (5–7)	—	Guaranteed Rate Field	21,906	38–91	W2
130	August 26	@ White Sox	2–6	Toussaint (2–6)	Sears (2–11)	—	Guaranteed Rate Field	21,508	38–92	L1
131	August 27	@ White Sox	1–6	Clevinger (6–6)	Blackburn (3–4)	—	Guaranteed Rate Field	20,236	38–93	L2
132	August 28	@ Mariners	0–7	Woo (2–3)	Muller (1–5)	—	T-Mobile Park	37,434	38–94	L3
133	August 29	@ Mariners	3–1	Newcomb (1–0)	Weaver (2–5)	May (15)	T-Mobile Park	44,280	39–94	W1
134	August 30	@ Mariners	4–5	Topa (4–4)	Snead (1–2)	Muñoz (11)	T-Mobile Park	29,247	39–95	L1

September/October: 11–17 (Home: 6–10; Away: 5–7)

#	Date	Opponent	Score	Win	Loss	Save	Stadium	Attendance	Record	Streak
135	September 1	Angels	9–2	Sears (3–11)	Sandoval (7–11)	—	Oakland Coliseum	12,073	40–95	W1
136	September 2	Angels	2–1	Blackburn (4–4)	Canning (7–5)	May (16)	Oakland Coliseum	13,709	41–95	W2
137	September 3	Angels	10–6	Pérez (1–1)	Soriano (0–1)	May (17)	Oakland Coliseum	12,425	42–95	W3
138	September 4	Blue Jays	5–6 (10)	Romano (5–5)	Pérez (1–2)	—	Oakland Coliseum	9,062	42–96	L1
139	September 5	Blue Jays	1–7	Bassitt (14–7)	Neal (1–1)	—	Oakland Coliseum	4,751	42–97	L2
140	September 6	Blue Jays	5–2	Sears (4–11)	Ryu (3–2)	May (18)	Oakland Coliseum	3,871	43–97	W1
141	September 8	@ Rangers	6–3	Sweet (1–0)	Montgomery (8–11)	May (19)	Globe Life Field	28,203	44–97	W2
142	September 9	@ Rangers	2–3	Smith (2–5)	Erceg (3–4)	Chapman (5)	Globe Life Field	34,166	44–98	L1
143	September 10	@ Rangers	4–9	Heaney (10–6)	Medina (3–9)	—	Globe Life Field	26,189	44–99	L2
144	September 11	@ Astros	4–0	Waldichuk (3–7)	Valdez (11–10)	—	Minute Maid Park	29,807	45–99	W1
145	September 12	@ Astros	6–2	Sears (5–11)	Verlander (11–8)	—	Minute Maid Park	36,504	46–99	W2
146	September 13	@ Astros	2–6	Brown (11–11)	Blackburn (4–5)	—	Minute Maid Park	37,864	46–100	L1
147	September 15	Padres	3–8	Lugo (7–7)	Newcomb (1–1)	—	Oakland Coliseum	17,828	46–101	L2
148	September 16	Padres	2–5	Waldron (1–3)	Miller (0–3)	Hader (29)	Oakland Coliseum	14,876	46–102	L3
149	September 17	Padres	1–10	Ávila (2–2)	Waldichuk (3–8)	—	Oakland Coliseum	8,680	46–103	L4
150	September 18	Mariners	0–5	Woo (4–4)	Sears (5–12)	—	Oakland Coliseum	4,972	46–104	L5
151	September 19	Mariners	2–7	Castillo (14–7)	Blackburn (4–6)	—	Oakland Coliseum	6,294	46–105	L6
152	September 20	Mariners	3–6	Kirby (11–10)	Estes (0–1)	Topa (3)	Oakland Coliseum	5,602	46–106	L7
153	September 21	Tigers	3–7	Skubal (7–3)	Medina (3–10)	—	Oakland Coliseum	6,160	46–107	L8
154	September 22	Tigers	8–2	Waldichuk (4–8)	Vest (2–1)	—	Oakland Coliseum	8,751	47–107	W1
155	September 23	Tigers	4–1	Boyle (1–0)	Wentz (3–12)	May (20)	Oakland Coliseum	9,776	48–107	W2
156	September 24	Tigers	0–2	Rodríguez (12–9)	Sears (5–13)	Lange (25)	Oakland Coliseum	13,102	48–108	L1
157	September 26	@ Twins	3–11	Ober (8–6)	Blackburn (4–7)	—	Target Field	22,329	48–109	L2
158	September 27	@ Twins	4–6	Keuchel (2–1)	Jiménez (0–2)	Jax (4)	Target Field	20,520	48–110	L3
159	September 28	@ Twins	2–1	Erceg (4–4)	Maeda (6–8)	May (21)	Target Field	19,466	49–110	W1
160	September 29	@ Angels	1–5	Daniel (1–1)	Waldichuk (4–9)	—	Angel Stadium	32,333	49–111	L1
161	September 30	@ Angels	7–3	Boyle (2–0)	Joyce (1–1)	—	Angel Stadium	31,633	50–111	W1
162	October 1	@ Angels	3–7	Fulmer (1–1)	Sears (5–14)	—	Angel Stadium	26,539	50–112	L1

== Season standings ==
=== American League West ===
AL West
Team	W	L	Pct.	GB	Home	Road
Houston Astros	90	72	.556	—	39‍–‍42	51‍–‍30
Texas Rangers	90	72	.556	—	50‍–‍31	40‍–‍41
Seattle Mariners	88	74	.543	2	45‍–‍36	43‍–‍38
Los Angeles Angels	73	89	.451	17	38‍–‍43	35‍–‍46
Oakland Athletics	50	112	.309	40	26‍–‍55	24‍–‍57

=== American League Wild Card ===
Division leaders
Team	W	L	Pct.
Baltimore Orioles	101	61	.623
Houston Astros	90	72	.556
Minnesota Twins	87	75	.537

Wild Card teams (Top 3 teams qualify for postseason)
Team	W	L	Pct.	GB
Tampa Bay Rays	99	63	.611	+10
Texas Rangers	90	72	.556	+1
Toronto Blue Jays	89	73	.549	—
Seattle Mariners	88	74	.543	1
New York Yankees	82	80	.506	7
Boston Red Sox	78	84	.481	11
Detroit Tigers	78	84	.481	11
Cleveland Guardians	76	86	.469	13
Los Angeles Angels	73	89	.451	16
Chicago White Sox	61	101	.377	28
Kansas City Royals	56	106	.346	33
Oakland Athletics	50	112	.309	39

=== Record vs. opponents ===
==== Record vs. American League ====
2023 American League record Source: MLB Standings Grid – 2023
Team	BAL	BOS	CWS	CLE	DET	HOU	KC	LAA	MIN	NYY	OAK	SEA	TB	TEX	TOR	NL
Baltimore	—	7–6	4–2	3–4	6–1	3–3	5–1	5–2	4–2	7–6	6–1	4–2	8–5	3–3	10–3	26–20
Boston	6–7	—	2–4	3–3	5–1	2–5	5–2	3–4	4–3	9–4	4–2	3–3	2–11	3–3	7–6	20–26
Chicago	2–4	4–2	—	8–5	5–8	3–4	6–7	3–4	4–9	4–2	3–4	2–4	1–6	1–5	0–6	15–31
Cleveland	4–3	3–3	5–8	—	4–9	2–4	7–6	3–4	7–6	2–4	5–1	4–3	3–3	3–3	4–3	20–26
Detroit	1–6	1–5	8–5	9–4	—	3–3	10–3	3–3	8–5	2–5	3–4	3–3	1–5	3–4	2–4	21–25
Houston	3–3	5–2	4–3	4–2	3–3	—	1–5	9–4	2–4	2–5	10–3	4–9	3–3	9–4	3–4	28–18
Kansas City	1–5	2–5	7–6	6–7	3–10	5–1	—	2–4	4–9	2–4	2–4	1–6	3–4	1–5	1–6	16–30
Los Angeles	2–5	4–3	4–3	4–3	3–3	4–9	4–2	—	3–3	4–2	7–6	5–8	2–4	6–7	2–4	19–27
Minnesota	2–4	3–4	9–4	6–7	5–8	4–2	9–4	3–3	—	4–3	5–1	3–4	1–5	5–2	3–3	25–21
New York	6–7	4–9	2–4	4–2	5–2	5–2	4–2	2–4	3–4	—	5–1	4–2	5–8	3–4	7–6	23–23
Oakland	1–6	2–4	4–3	1–5	4–3	3–10	4–2	6–7	1–5	1–5	—	1–12	2–5	4–9	2–4	14–32
Seattle	2–4	3–3	4–2	3–4	3–3	9–4	6–1	8–5	4–3	2–4	12–1	—	3–4	4–9	3–3	22–24
Tampa Bay	5–8	11–2	6–1	3–3	5–1	3–3	4–3	4–2	5–1	8–5	5–2	4–3	—	2–4	7–6	27–19
Texas	3–3	3–3	5–1	3–3	4–3	4–9	5–1	7–6	2–5	4–3	9–4	9–4	4–2	—	6–1	22–24
Toronto	3–10	6–7	6–0	3–4	4–2	4–3	6–1	4–2	3–3	6–7	4–2	3–3	6–7	1–6	—	30–16

Updated with the results of all games through October 1, 2023.

==== Record vs. National League ====
2023 American League record vs. National League Source: MLB Standings
Team	ARI	ATL	CHC	CIN	COL	LAD	MIA	MIL	NYM	PHI	PIT	SD	SF	STL	WSH
Baltimore	2–1	1–2	1–2	1–2	2–1	1–2	3–0	1–2	3–0	1–2	2–1	1–2	2–1	1–2	4–0
Boston	2–1	3–1	2–1	1–2	1–2	1–2	0–3	2–1	2–1	2–1	0–3	2–1	1–2	0–3	1–2
Chicago	1–2	2–1	1–3	2–1	1–2	1–2	1–2	0–3	1–2	1–2	1–2	0–3	1–2	1–2	1–2
Cleveland	1–2	1–2	2–1	2–2	1–2	1–2	1–2	1–2	0–3	2–1	2–1	1–2	1–2	2–1	2–1
Detroit	0–3	1–2	1–2	1–2	2–1	1–2	1–2	2–1	3–0	0–3	2–2	1–2	3–0	2–1	1–2
Houston	3–0	3–0	3–0	0–3	3–1	1–2	2–1	1–2	2–1	1–2	2–1	2–1	1–2	2–1	2–1
Kansas City	1–2	0–3	1–2	0–3	1–2	2–1	0–3	0–3	3–0	1–2	0–3	2–1	2–1	2–2	1–2
Los Angeles	1–2	1–2	3–0	0–3	1–2	0–4	0–3	1–2	2–1	1–2	2–1	0–3	2–1	3–0	2–1
Minnesota	3–0	0–3	2–1	2–1	2–1	1–2	1–2	2–2	2–1	2–1	2–1	2–1	1–2	2–1	1–2
New York	2–1	0–3	1–2	3–0	1–2	2–1	1–2	1–2	2–2	2–1	2–1	2–1	2–1	1–2	1–2
Oakland	1–2	2–1	0–3	1–2	2–1	0–3	0–3	3–0	0–3	0–3	2–1	0–3	2–2	1–2	0–3
Seattle	2–1	1–2	1–2	1–2	3–0	0–3	2–1	0–3	1–2	1–2	2–1	3–1	2–1	2–1	1–2
Tampa Bay	2–1	1–2	1–2	2–1	3–0	2–1	3–1	2–1	1–2	0–3	3–0	1–2	2–1	1–2	3–0
Texas	1–3	1–2	1–2	0–3	3–0	1–2	3–0	0–3	2–1	3–0	2–1	0–3	2–1	2–1	1–2
Toronto	3–0	3–0	1–2	2–1	2–1	2–1	2–1	2–1	3–0	1–3	3–0	1–2	2–1	1–2	2–1

Updated with the results of all games through October 1, 2023.

== Season summary ==
=== Opening Day starters ===
Thursday, March 30, 2023, vs. Los Angeles Angels at Oakland Coliseum.

Name	Pos.
Tony Kemp	2B
Conner Capel	DH
Aledmys Díaz	SS
Seth Brown	LF
Jesús Aguilar	1B
Ramón Laureano	RF
Jace Peterson	3B
Shea Langeliers	C
Esteury Ruiz	CF
Kyle Muller	P

=== March/April ===
- March 24 – The Athletics announced that Kyle Muller will be the Opening Day starting pitcher.
- March 30 – In the first game of the season, the A's faced the Los Angeles Angels at Oakland Coliseum. Kyle Muller pitched five innings, allowing only one run. Oakland scored two runs in the eighth inning to win the game 2–1. Aledmys Díaz had two hits in his A's debut and drove in the game winning run. Trevor May earned the victory in his first game with Oakland.
- April 1 – After a scheduled day off, the A's resumed their three-game series with the Angels. Ramón Laureano hit his first home run of the season, however, the Angels scored 11 runs in the 3rd inning, easily defeating Oakland 13–1. Shintaro Fujinami struggled in his first career start, allowing eight runs in 2.1 innings.
- April 2 – The Athletics were limited to only five hits in a 6–0 loss to the Angels. Jesús Aguilar and Shea Langeliers each recorded two hits for Oakland. Mike Trout and Shohei Ohtani hit back-to-back home runs for Los Angeles in the fifth inning.
- April 3 – Oakland opened a three-game home series against the Cleveland Guardians. Seth Brown hit a two-run home run in the ninth inning to tie the game. Ramón Laureano and Jace Peterson also hit home runs, but the A's lost the high scoring game 12–11 to Cleveland in 10 innings.
- April 4 – Tony Kemp hit a game winning single in the bottom of the ninth inning, scoring Ryan Noda, as Oakland snapped their three-game losing streak with a 4–3 win over Cleveland. Trevor May earned his second win of the season.
- April 5 – In the eighth inning, Ryan Noda hit his first career home run, then Jesús Aguilar hit a three-run home run, as the A's rallied down from 4–0 to tie the game. In the tenth inning, the Guardians scored twice, defeating Oakland 6–4 in the final game of the series.
- April 7 – The Athletics began their first road series of the season, facing the Tampa Bay Rays at Tropicana Field in St. Petersburg, Florida. Ryan Noda hit a home run for the second consecutive game and Shea Langeliers hit his first home run of the season. Ken Waldichuk struggled in his start, allowing eight runs in three innings, as the A's lost to Tampa Bay 9–5.
- April 8 - Oakland managed only three singles in an 11–0 loss to the Rays. Shintaro Fujinami struggled, allowing five runs in 4.1 innings, while walking four and striking out only one batter. The loss was the third in the row for Oakland and sixth in seven games since winning on Opening Day.
- April 9 - The A's offense continued to struggle, as Ramón Laureano hit a double in the fourth inning for Oakland's only hit of the game. James Kaprielian also struggled in his start, allowing seven earned runs in 4.2 innings, as the Rays swept the three-game series, beating the Athletics 11–0 for the second consecutive game.
- April 10 - Oakland began a four-game road series against the Baltimore Orioles at Camden Yards in Baltimore, Maryland. Ramón Laureano hit an RBI triple in the first inning. That would be the only offense for the A's, as the Orioles won the series opener 5–1, extending Oakland's losing skid to five games.
- April 11 - Shea Langeliers hit a three-run home run in the fifth inning and Jace Peterson drove in two runners. Oakland took a 7–3 lead in the fifth inning, however, the Orioles came back, sending the A's to their sixth straight loss, by a score of 12–8. Baltimore's Ryan Mountcastle hit two home runs and drove in nine runs.
- April 12 - Carlos Pérez had three hits, including a home run, while Brent Rooker hit a three-run homer, as Oakland snapped their six game losing streak, defeating the Orioles 8–4. Chad Smith earned his first career victory. The win was Oakland's first on the road this season.
- April 13 - Brent Rooker hit two home runs and drove in five runners, as the A's rallied from a 7–4 deficit to tie the game. In the bottom of the ninth, the Orioles Adley Rutschman hit the game winning home run, as the Athletics lost to Baltimore 8–7. Esteury Ruiz and Carlos Pérez each had three hits for Oakland.
- April 14 - The Athletics returned home to begin a three-game interleague series against the New York Mets. The A's walked an Oakland-record 17 batters, the second most in franchise history, only behind 18 walks issued in 1916 when they were the Philadelphia Athletics. Brent Rooker hit a home run for the third straight game, while Aledmys Díaz and Shea Langeliers added home runs for Oakland. The Mets Francisco Lindor hit two home runs and drove in seven runs, as New York crushed the Athletics 17–6.
- April 15 - Oakland's offense was limited to only five hits, as the A's lost their third game in a row, dropping a 3–2 decision to the Mets. Shintaro Fujinami pitched well, allowing three runs in six innings, but took the loss to drop his record to 0–3.
- April 16 - In the bottom of the eighth, Shea Langeliers hit a two-run double, giving Oakland a 3–2 lead. The Mets came back as Pete Alonso hit a home run off of Dany Jiménez, tying the game 3–3. In the 10th inning, the Mets took the lead 4–3 after a wild pitch from Zach Jackson. The A's couldn't score in the bottom half of the inning, as New York swept the three-game series, winning the game 4–3. With the loss, Oakland's record dropped to 3–13.
- April 17 - The Athletics began a three-game home interleague series against the Chicago Cubs. Kyle Muller struggled in his start, allowing 13 hits and six runs in four innings. Esteury Ruiz had two hits for the A's and scored their only run in a 10–1 loss.
- April 18 - The A's were held to only two hits in a 4–0 loss to the Cubs. Ken Waldichuk had a solid start, pitching five shutout innings and striking out five batters. With the loss, Oakland dropped to 3–15 on the season, tying the 1951 Philadelphia Athletics for the worst 18 game start in franchise history.
- April 19 - Oakland dropped their seventh straight game, losing 12–2 to the Cubs. In his Major League debut, Mason Miller started and pitched 4.1 innings, allowing two runs and striking out five and had a no-decision. With the loss, the A's dropped to 3–16, and continue to tie the 1951 team for the worst start in club history.
- April 20 - Team president Dave Kaval announced that the franchise had purchased a plot of land in Las Vegas near the strip. In a statement to MLB.com, he stated that the franchise is "really putting all our focus in Las Vegas and the efforts there".
- April 21 - After a scheduled day off, Oakland began a seven-game road trip, beginning with three games in Arlington, Texas to face the Texas Rangers. After Texas took a 4–0 lead in the first inning, JP Sears settled in and pitched six innings, striking out a career-high 11 batters. The A's battled back, tying the game 4–4 heading into the ninth inning. In the ninth, Jordan Díaz came up as a pinch hitter and hit his first career home run. Jeurys Familia shut the door in the bottom half of the inning, earning his first save of the season, as Oakland defeated Texas 5–4 to snap their seven game losing streak.
- April 22 - Shintaro Fujinami struggled in his start, allowing eight runs in 2.1 innings pitched, as Texas crushed the Athletics 18–3. Fujinami's record dropped to 0–4 with a 14.40 ERA in his first four career starts. Jesús Aguilar hit a home run for the A's in the loss. The Rangers Adolis García hit three home runs and drove in eight runners.
- April 23 - Shea Langeliers hit his fourth home run of the season, however, the A's lost the final game of the series 5–2 to Texas. Former Oakland player Robbie Grossman hit a three-run home run for the Rangers in the second inning and drove in four runs during the game. Rangers ace Jacob de Grom struck out 11 batters in six innings. The loss dropped the A's overall record to 4–18.
- April 24 - Oakland concluded their seven-game road trip with a four-game series at Angel Stadium in Anaheim, California against the Los Angeles Angels. In the series opener, Brent Rooker and Jesús Aguilar each hit two home runs and Kevin Smith added a home run, as Oakland rallied from being down 8–7 to defeat the Angels 11–10 in 10 innings. Adam Oller earned his first win of the season and Jeurys Familia earned his second save.
- April 25 - The Angels roughed up Mason Miller by scoring four runs in the first inning, erasing an early 1–0 lead the Athletics took in the first half of the inning. Shea Langeliers hit his fifth home run of the year, as Oakland dropped a 5–3 decision to Los Angeles.
- April 26 - Luis Medina made his major league debut, pitching five innings, in which he allowed eight runs, seven of them earned, while striking out six batters. Kevin Smith hit his second home run of the season. Esteury Ruiz stole four bases, giving him nine total on the season. The A's dropped their second straight game, losing 11–3.
- April 27 - Brent Rooker hit a three-run home run and Shea Langeliers hit a two-run homer. JP Sears struggled in his start, pitching 4.2 innings while allowing six runs. The Angels defeated Oakland by a score of 8–7, as they finished their seven game road trip with a 2–5 record.
- April 28 - The Athletics returned home to face the Cincinnati Reds in a three-game interleague series. Ryan Noda and Brent Rooker each had three hits, a home run and drove home two runners, while Shea Langeliers had two hits and drove in three runners. Drew Rucinski struggled in his Athletics debut, allowing 11 hits and five runs, three earned, in 5.2 innings. This was Rucinski's first MLB game since September 29, 2018. The A's losing streak extended to four games, as Cincinnati won the series opener 11–7.
- April 29 - Kyle Muller pitched a solid five innings, allowing only one run, while striking out three. The A's took a 2–1 lead into the ninth, however, the Reds scored twice off of Jeurys Familia. The A's were shut down in the bottom half of the inning, as their losing skid reached five games with a 3–2 loss to Cincinnati.
- April 30 - Esteury Ruiz hit a game-winning single in the bottom of the ninth inning, as the A's avoided the series sweep by winning the final game 5–4 over the Reds. Brent Rooker and Jesús Aguilar each hit a home run and drove home two runners. The win snapped the A's losing streak at five games.

=== May ===
- May 2 - After a day off, the Athletics hosted the Seattle Mariners for a three-game series. In the series opener, Mason Miller was throwing a no-hitter after seven innings before being pulled out of the game after throwing 100 pitches and Oakland holding a 1–0 lead. With Miller out of the game, the Mariners scored twice in the top of the eighth inning, as Oakland lost the game 2–1. Esteury Ruiz had the lone RBI for Oakland, hitting a double in the sixth inning to score Tony Kemp.
- May 3 - JP Sears pitched six shutout innings, allowing four hits and striking out seven. Esteury Ruiz and Tony Kemp each hit RBI doubles in the sixth inning, giving the A's a 2–0 lead. The Mariners battled back, tying the game in the ninth inning. In the tenth, Seattle put up five runs, as Oakland lost the game 7–2.
- May 4 - The Mariners completed the three-game sweep, defeating Oakland 5–3. JJ Bleday hit his first home run of the season. Bleday and Ramón Laureano each had two hits in the loss. The loss dropped the A's record to 3–15 at home and 6–26 overall.
- May 5 - Oakland begins a three-game weekend series at Kauffman Stadium to face the Kansas City Royals in Kansas City, Missouri. Brent Rooker and Ramón Laureano hit back-to-back home runs in the third inning, while Rooker and Ryan Noda each drove home three runners. Esteury Ruiz stole two bases, giving him 15 on the season to lead the American League. The Athletics snapped their three game losing skid, defeating the Royals 12–8.
- May 6 - JJ Bleday had two hits, including a home run, while Esteury Ruiz drove home two runners, as the Athletics won consecutive games for the first time this season, defeating the Royals 5–4. The A's bullpen pitched four shutout innings, allowing only one run. Zach Jackson earned his first save of the season in the win.
- May 7 - Mason Miller had a solid start, pitching six innings, allowing two runs and striking out five. The A's offense was shut down, as they managed only four hits in the game. Kansas City won the final game of the series, defeating Oakland 5–1.
- May 8 - The Athletics travelled to The Bronx, New York for a three game series against the New York Yankees at Yankee Stadium. JP Sears had a tough start against his former team, as the Yankees hit three home runs against him. Sears allowed five runs in 5.1 innings pitched. Esteury Ruiz had two hits and stole his 17th base of the season in the A's 7–2 loss to the Yankees.
- May 9 - Jordan Díaz hit three home runs and collected four RBI to lead the Athletics offense. Shea Langeliers had three hits and scored a run. Drew Rucinski struggled in his start, allowing seven runs, five earned, in five innings. Oakland dropped their third game in a row, losing 10–5 to the Yankees.
- May 10 - In the final game of the series, Carlos Pérez, Jace Peterson and JJ Bleday each hit solo home runs. Kyle Muller allowed four runs in the first inning, then the Yankees put the game out of reach with seven runs in the fifth. New York defeated Oakland 11–3 to sweep the series.
- May 11 - Oakland returns home for a four-game series against their divisional rivals, the Texas Rangers. The Athletics offense managed only three hits, two of them by Esteury Ruiz, as Texas shut out Oakland 4–0. The loss extends Oakland's losing skid to five games.
- May 12 - Brent Rooker hit a walk-off three-run home runs for the Athletics, as they snapped their five game losing streak with a 9–7 in ten innings. Esteury Ruiz had four hits, drove home four runners and scored two runs and he hit his first career home run. Carlos Pérez and Kevin Smith also hit home runs in the victory.
- May 13 - The Athletics managed only five hits in a 5–0 loss to the Rangers. James Kaprielian pitched seven innings, allowing three runs and striking out seven. Rangers pitcher Jon Gray pitched eight shutout innings.
- May 14 - Shea Langeliers hit a two-run home run and drove home three runners, however, the A's dropped the final game of the series, losing 11–3 to the Rangers. Ramón Laureano and Aledmys Díaz each had two hits for Oakland. The game was tied 3–3 in the top of the eighth, however, Texas broke it open with eight runs in the inning. The loss drops the A's overall record to 9–33.
- May 15 - The A's opened a three-game interleague home series against the Arizona Diamondbacks. Nick Allen had two hits and scored a run and Jace Peterson hit a solo home run in the A's 5–2 loss to the Diamondbacks. Drew Rucinski struggled in his start, allowing five runs in three innings, walking five batters and recording no strikeouts. The announced attendance was 2,064, the A's smallest home crowd (excluding the COVID-19 restricted 2020 season) since drawing 1,037 fans on September 19, 1979.
- May 16 - Ryan Noda hit a pinch-hit grand slam in the seventh inning, erasing Arizona's 8–4 lead. With the game tied 8–8 in the bottom of the 12th inning, Esteury Ruiz singled home Ramón Laureano, as the Athletics came back to defeat the Diamondbacks by a score of 9–8.
- May 17 - Ramón Laureano hit a three-run home run for the Athletics, however, it wasn't enough as the A's dropped the final game of the series, losing 5–3 to Arizona. Luis Medina had a solid start, pitching six innings while allowing three runs.
- May 19 - Following an off day, the A's travelled to Minute Maid Park in Houston, Texas for a three game series against their divisional rivals, the Houston Astros. In the series opener, Esteury Ruiz had two hits, scored a run and stole his league leading 21st base of the season. The Astros shutdown the A's offense, as Houston won the game 5–1.
- May 20 - JP Sears allowed two runs in the first inning, but settled down after that, as he pitched six innings without allowing any more runs. Esteury Ruiz stole two bases, bringing his season total to a league leading 23, as he had two hits and score a run. The A's dropped a close game, losing 3–2 to Houston.
- May 21 - The Astros Framber Valdez pitched a four-hit complete-game shutout, as Oakland dropped the series finale by a 2–0 score. James Kaprielian pitched five innings, allowing only one run. Esteury Ruiz had another stolen base, bringing his season total to 24.
- May 22 - Oakland travels to T-Mobile Park in Seattle, Washington to begin a four-game series against their divisional rivals, the Seattle Mariners. The Athletics were limited to five hits and two runs in a lopsided 11–2 loss to the Mariners. Kyle Muller struggled, allowing six runs in five innings, dropping his record to 1–4 with an ERA of 8.04.
- May 23 - The Athletics losing streak was extended to six games, as they dropped a 3–2 decision to the Mariners. Ramón Laureano had two hits for Oakland and drove home a run. Esteury Ruiz stole his 25th base of the season. With the loss, Oakland's win-loss record dropped to 10–40 on the season.
- May 24 - Oakland continued to struggle, as they allowed five runs in the fourth inning to fall behind, losing their seventh game in a row, by a 6–1 score to Seattle. Aledmys Díaz had two hits and drove home the A's only run on a seventh inning double. Esteury Ruiz swiped his league-leading 26th base.
- May 25 - The Mariners completed the four-game sweep, defeating Oakland 3–2. The A's took a 2–0 lead in the first inning after a Seth Brown two-run home run. Seattle limited Oakland to three hits, two of them by Ryan Noda. The loss was Oakland's 16th in their past 18 games and dropped their overall record to 10–42.
- May 26 - The A's return home for a three-game series against the Houston Astros. Seth Brown hit a two-run home run, however, Oakland lost their ninth game in a row, losing by a 5–2 score. With the loss, Oakland became the first team since 1900 to lose 43 of their first 53 games of the season.
- May 27 - Oakland dropped their tenth game in a row, losing 6–3 to the Astros. Shea Langeliers had two hits and drove home two runs to lead the Athletics offense. Hogan Harris pitched five innings, allowing only one hit and no runs.
- May 28 - The Astros handed the Athletics their 11th straight loss by a score of 10–1. Ryan Noda hit a leadoff homerun in the first inning for Oakland. With the loss, the A's record dropped to 10–45.
- May 29 - Oakland opened a three-game home interleague series against the Atlanta Braves. Ryan Noda hit a three-run home run in the fifth inning, as the A's snapped their 11 game losing streak, with a 7–2 win over the Braves. Lucas Erceg pitched three scoreless innings, earning his first career MLB victory.
- May 30 - JP Sears pitched six innings, allowing only one run and four hits. In the bottom of the ninth inning, Jonah Bride grounded into a fielder's choice at third, however, on an error, Seth Brown scored the winning run, as Oakland defeated the Braves 2–1.
- May 31 - The A's were held to only three hits, as Atlanta won the final game of the series 4–2. Esteury Ruiz stole his league-leading 29th base of the season.

=== June ===
- June 2 - Oakland began a three-game interleague series on the road against the Miami Marlins at LoanDepot Park in Miami, Florida. The Marlins held Oakland to five hits, defeating the A's 4–0. Hogan Harris pitched five innings, allowing two runs and struck out five.
- June 3 - Luis Medina struggled in his start, allowing six runs in two innings, as the Marlins crushed the A's 12–1. Ryan Noda and Shea Langeliers each had two hits, while Langeliers drove home Oakland's lone run. Miami's Luis Arráez had five hits to increase his league leading batting average to .390, and he drove home five runners.
- June 4 - The Marlins completed the three-game sweep, as Oakland dropped the final game of the series by a 7–5 score. Ramón Laureano had two hits, drove home two runs and scored a run.
- June 5 - The A's road trip continued with a three-game interleague series against the Pittsburgh Pirates at PNC Park in Pittsburgh, Pennsylvania. Oakland lost the opening game of the series 5–4, extending their road losing streak to 15 games. Ryan Noda had two hits, scoring a run and driving home another and Brent Rooker also had two hits and scored two runs.
- June 6 - Jace Peterson recorded five hits, including two home runs, and he drove home five runners, as the Athletics snapped their 15-game road losing streak with an impressive 11–2 win. Shea Langeliers and Ryan Noda also hit home runs for Oakland. James Kaprielian pitched six innings, allowing only one earned run, to record his first win of the season.
- June 7 - The Athletics scored seven runs in the first inning, as they won the final game of the series 9–5. Every player in the A's lineup had a hit, and were led by Seth Brown, who had three hits. Ryan Noda hit a home run and drove home two. Hogan Harris earned his first career victory, allowing three runs in five innings. Trevor May earned his first save with the Athletics.
- June 9 - Following a day off, the A's conclude their nine-game road trip with a three-game interleague against the Milwaukee Brewers at American Family Field in Milwaukee, Wisconsin. Esteury Ruiz had two hits and stole his 30th base of the season and Ramón Laureano also collected two hits and drove home two runners, as the A's won three consecutive games for the first time this season, defeating Milwaukee 5–2. Luis Medina pitched five innings, allowing two runs and striking out six for his first career victory.
- June 10 - The Athletics extended their winning streak to four games, defeating the Brewers 2–1 in 10 innings. Aledmys Díaz had three hits and drove home the game winning run in the tenth inning. Paul Blackburn pitched six shutout innings, striking out five. Sam Long earned his first save of the season.
- June 11 - Oakland completed the three-game series sweep, defeating the Brewers 8–6. Seth Brown, Brent Rooker and Kevin Smith each hit home runs. JP Sears pitched five innings, allowing two runs and striking out five to earn his first win of the season. With the win, the A's extended their winning streak to five games.
- June 12 - The Athletics returned home for a four-game series against the Tampa Bay Rays. Shea Langeliers hit a three-run double in the fifth inning, leading Oakland to a 4–3 win to extend their winning streak to six games. James Kaprielian pitched six innings, earning his second win of the season and Ken Waldichuk pitched three shutout innings to earn his first career save.
- June 13 - Hogan Harris pitched seven innings, allowing only one run, to lead the Athletics to their seventh consecutive win, defeating the Rays 2–1. Brent Rooker had two hits including an RBI double in the seventh inning and Carlos Pérez drove home the winning run in the eighth on a groundout.
- June 14 - JJ Bleday hit a three-run home run, however, the A's winning streak was snapped, as the Rays defeated Oakland 6–3. Jace Peterson had two hits.
- June 15 - Seth Brown drove home two runners, however, the Rays pitching staff held Oakland to only five hits and struck out 17 batters, as Tampa Bay won the final game of the four-game series 4–3 to earn the series split.
- June 16 - The Athletics will hosted the Philadelphia Phillies for a three-game interleague series. In the first game, Esteury Ruiz had two hits and stole two bases, bringing his season total to a league-high 35. Ruiz drove home the A's only run, as he singled home Shea Langeliers, as Oakland dropped the game 6–1.
- June 17 - Carlos Pérez had three hits, including a home run, however, the A's dropped their fourth game in a row, losing 3–2 to the Phillies in 12 innings. Esteury Ruiz had two hits and stole his 36th base of the season.
- June 18 - The A's continued to slump, as they lost their fifth game in a row, dropping a 3–2 decision to the Phillies. Aledmys Díaz hit a home run for Oakland. Hogan Harris pitched six innings, allowing two runs and struck out seven batters, however, he lost his first game of his career. With the loss, the Athletics dropped to 9–29 at home on the season.
- June 20 - Following an off day, the A's began a six-game road trip, beginning with three games against the Cleveland Guardians at Progressive Field in Cleveland, Ohio. Tony Kemp hit a two-run home run, however, the A's lost to the Guardians 3–2 in 10 innings. With the loss, Oakland's losing streak is now at six games.
- June 21 - Esteury Ruiz had three hits, drove home two runs and stole two bases, bringing his MLB-league leading total to 39, however, the Guardians sent Oakland to their seventh straight loss, as Cleveland won the game 7–6.
- June 22 - The Athletics offense struggled, as the club managed only three singles, in a 6–1 loss to the Guardians. JP Sears had a solid outing, pitching seven innings, allowing two runs and striking out eight batters. With the loss, the A's losing streak extended to eight games.
- June 23 - Oakland headed north to the Rogers Centre in Toronto, Ontario, Canada for a three-game series against the Toronto Blue Jays. Shea Langeliers hit a tie-breaking solo home run in the ninth inning, as Oakland defeated the Blue Jays 5–4 to snap their eight game losing skid. JJ Bleday also hit a home run, a three-run shot in the first inning.
- June 24 - Seth Brown hit a solo home run and Tyler Wade had two hits and drove home a run in the A's 7–3 loss to the Blue Jays.
- June 25 - The A's were limited to only three hits, including a home run by Tony Kemp, as they lost the final game of the series to the Blue Jays by a score of 12–1. Luis Medina struggled with control, walking seven batters in five innings.
- June 27 - Following an off-day, the A's returned home for a three-game series against the New York Yankees. Paul Blackburn earned his first win the season, pitching 5.1 innings while allowing only one run, as the Athletics won the game 2–1. Esteury Ruiz had two hits and stole his league-leading 40th base.
- June 28 - New York Yankees starting pitcher Domingo Germán threw the 24th perfect game in MLB history, as the Yankees shut out the Athletics 11–0.
- June 29 - Seth Brown had three hits and drove home a run, however, the A's dropped the final game of the series, losing 10–4. The loss dropped the A's record to 21–62 on the season.
- June 30 - Oakland returned home to host the Chicago White Sox for a three-game series. This was the A's final home series before the All-Star break. In the series opener, Aledmys Díaz, Shea Langeliers and Tony Kemp each had two hits, a run and an RBI, leading the A's to a 7–4 victory over the White Sox.

=== July ===
- July 1 - In the tenth inning, Tyler Wade scored on an error by former Athletic Elvis Andrus, as Oakland defeated the White Sox 7–6. Seth Brown hit a home run and Esteury Ruiz stole his league-leading 42nd base of the season.
- July 2 - Brent Rooker hit a pinch-hit home run in the eighth inning, however, the A's were not able to complete the comeback, as they dropped a close game by a score of 8–7. The A's were down 5–0 early in the game and 8–3 in the eighth before making the game close.
- July 4 - After a day off, the Athletics were on the road for a three-game series against the Detroit Tigers at Comerica Park in Detroit, Michigan, beginning with an Independence Day matchup. In the 10th inning, Ryan Noda singled to left, scoring Tyler Wade for the only run of the game, as Oakland shut out the Tigers 1–0. JP Sears pitched 7.1 innings, allowing no runs, in his start.
- July 5 - The A's offense exploded for 12 runs and 14 hits, as Oakland crushed the Tigers 12–3. Jordan Díaz had three hits, including a home run. Shea Langeliers and Ryan Noda also hit home runs in the victory. With the win, Oakland has victories in four of their past five games.
- July 6 - Oakland was limited to four hits, as they were shut out by the Tigers by a 9–0 score. Jordan Díaz had two of the A's hits in the game.
- July 7 - The Athletics headed to Boston, Massachusetts for a three-game series at Fenway Park against the Boston Red Sox for their final series before the All-Star break. In the series opener, Seth Brown hit a two-run home run, but it wasn't enough, as the Red Sox defeated Oakland 7–3.
- July 8 - Brent Rooker hit his 15th home run of the season and Manny Piña hit his first homer, however, the A's lost their third consecutive game, losing 10–3 to the Red Sox.
- July 9 - The A's dropped their final game before the All-Star break, as the Red Sox swept the series, defeating Oakland 4–3. Brent Rooker had three hits, including a home run. JP Sears pitched five innings, allowing only one hit and no earned runs.
- July 11 - Brent Rooker was the Athletics only All-Star representative at the 2023 Major League Baseball All-Star Game held at T-Mobile Park in Seattle, Washington. In two at-bats, Rooker hit a double, as the National League defeated the American League 3–2.
- July 14 - Oakland opened the second half of the series with a three-game home series against the Minnesota Twins. In his MLB debut, Zack Gelof hit a double and drove home a run, however, the A's lost to the Twins, by a 5–4 score.
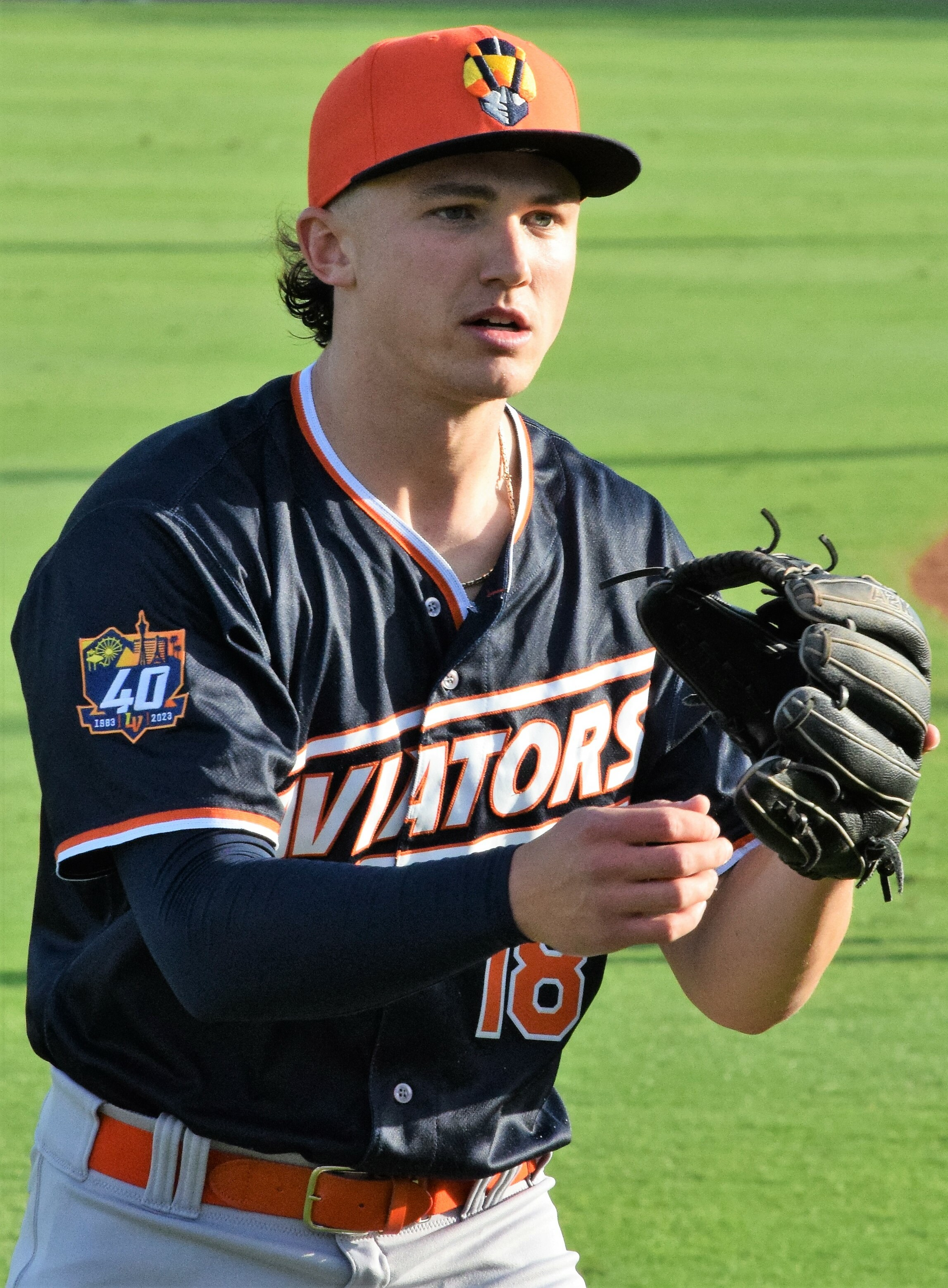
  Zack Gelof, seen here with the Las Vegas Aviators on April 19, 2023, made his Major League debut with the Athletics on July 14, 2023.
- July 15 - The A's dropped their sixth game in a row, losing to the Twins by a score of 10–7. Seth Brown and Ryan Noda each hit home runs. Tyler Soderstrom got the first two hits of his career and Zack Gelof scored twice.
- July 16 - Zack Gelof had two hits and scored a run, and Jordan Díaz hit a home run, however the A's lost their seventh straight game, coming up short in a close 5–4 game. The loss extends the A's losing streak to seven games and drops their overall record to 25–70 on the season.
- July 17 - The A's homestand continued with a three-game series against the Boston Red Sox. In the series opener, the A's were held to only one hit, as they lost 7–0 to Boston.
- July 18 - Ryan Noda and JJ Bleday each hit home runs in the second inning, and Luis Medina pitched 5.2 innings, allowing no runs and striking out six, as the A's snapped their losing streak, shutting out the Red Sox 3–0.
- July 19 - Jace Peterson, Cody Thomas and JJ Bleday each hit two-run home runs, leading the A's to a 6–5 win over the Red Sox. Oakland's bullpen allowed only one hit and no runs in 4.1 innings pitched. Ángel Felipe earned his first career victory and Trevor May recorded his eighth save of the season.
- July 20 - The A's hosted their divisional rivals, the Houston Astros, for a four-game home series to conclude their 10-game home stand. In the series opener, the Astros pitching staff held Oakland to only one run, as Houston won the game 3–1. Seth Brown had two of the Athletics hits and drove home the lone run with a first inning double, scoring Tony Kemp. Hogan Harris had a very solid start, pitching six innings and allowing two runs, however, he took the loss.
- July 21 - Tony Kemp had two hits and two runs, as the Athletics lost to the Astros 6–4.
- July 22 - Zack Gelof hit his first career home run, and Seth Brown hit his 10th home run of the season, leading the Athletics to a 4–1 victory over the Astros.
- July 23 - JJ Bleday had two hits, including a home run, while Tyler Soderstrom drove home his first career run, however, the A's dropped a close game, losing 3–2 to the Astros. Luis Medina pitched a solid game, going five innings, allowing only two hits and one run.
- July 25 - Following a day off, the A's were on the road to Oracle Park in San Francisco, California for the first two games of the Bay Bridge Series. The Giants held the Athletics to five hits, as Oakland dropped the first game, losing 2–1.
- July 26 - Tony Kemp had three hits, however, the Giants defeated the Athletics by a score of 8–3 to sweep the two-game series. The teams will finish the Bay Bridge Series in early-August with two games in Oakland.
- July 28 - The A's continued their road trip with a three-game road interleague series against the Colorado Rockies at Coors Field in Denver, Colorado. Zack Gelof and Ramón Laureano each hit home runs, leading the Athletics to an 8–5 victory over the Rockies.
- July 29 - Seth Brown had three hits, while Zack Gelof and Brent Rooker each hit home runs, as the Athletics crushed the Rockies 11–3. Paul Blackburn pitched six innings, allowing two runs and striking out seven, improving his win-loss record to 2–2 on the season.
- July 30 - The Rockies limited the Athletics to five hits, as Oakland lost the final game of the series 2–0. Ramón Laureano had two hits for the A's.

=== August ===
- August 1 - Following a day off, the Athletics were in Los Angeles, California for a three-game interleague series against the NL West leading Los Angeles Dodgers. Zack Gelof, Brent Rooker and Jordan Díaz each hit solo home runs, as Oakland dropped the opening game of the series 7–3.
- August 2 - Shea Langeliers hit a solo home run in the Athletics 10–1 loss to the Dodgers. Hogan Harris struggled in his start, allowing eight runs in only three innings pitched.
- August 3 - Zack Gelof had two hits, including his fifth home run of the season and Tyler Soderstrom hit his first career home run, however, the Dodgers completed the three-game sweep, defeating Oakland 8–2.
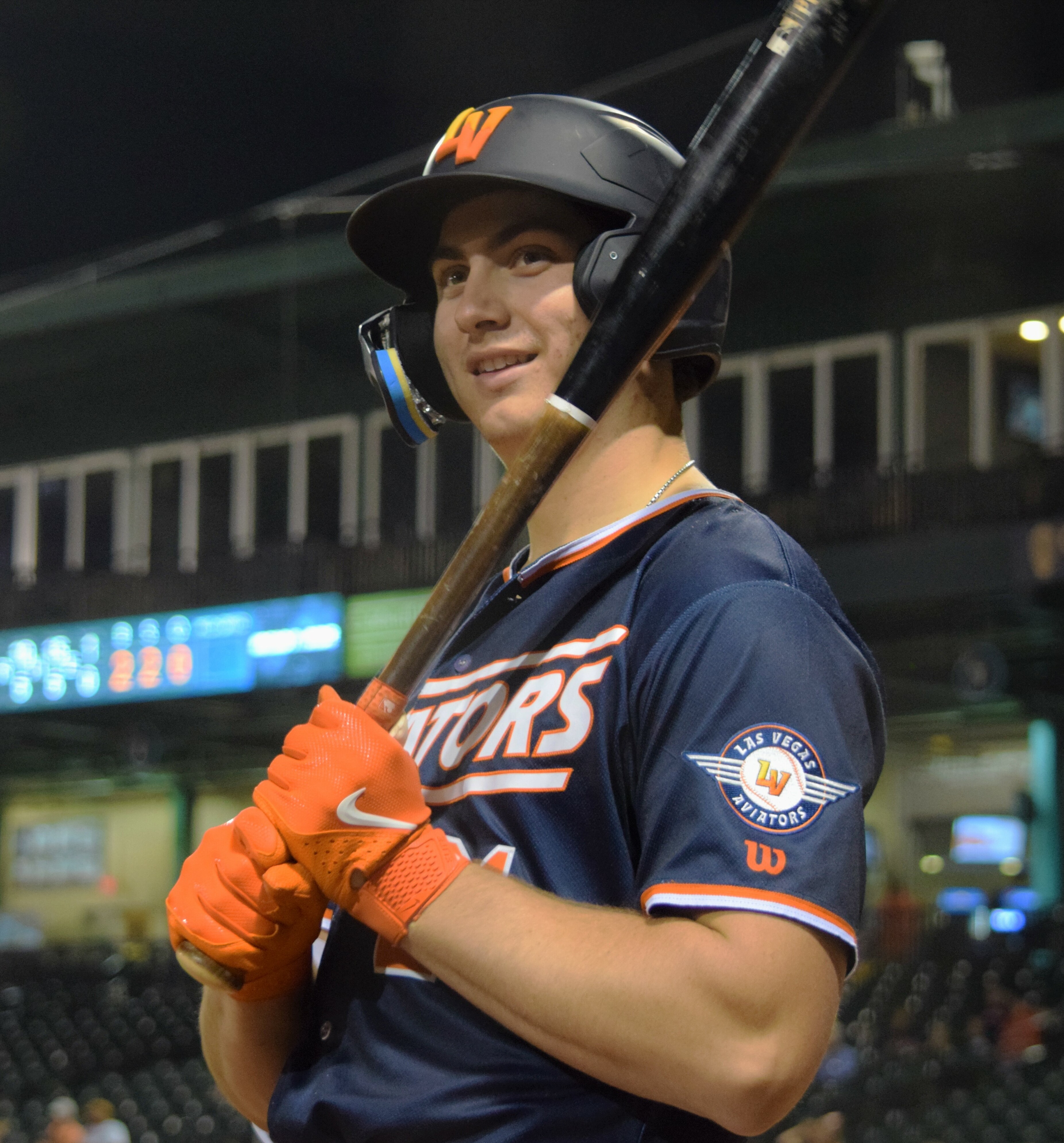
  Tyler Soderstrom, seen here with the Las Vegas Aviators, hit his first career home run on August 3, 2023 against the Los Angeles Dodgers.
- August 5 - After a scheduled day off, the Athletics hosted the San Francisco Giants for a two-game series to conclude the Bay Bridge Series for the season. Jordan Díaz hit a home run in the fifth inning and with the game tied 1–1, Seth Brown singled home Díaz, as Oakland defeated San Francisco 2–1. Paul Blackburn pitched six shutout innings, allowing only two hits.
- August 6 - Nick Allen had three hits, including two home runs, leading the Athletics to an 8–6 win over the Giants, sweeping the two-game series. The A's and Giants split their four games during the season, however, the Athletics won the Bay Bridge Series as they won the final game of the series.
- August 7 - The Athletics were at home for a three-game series against the AL West division leading Texas Rangers. Nick Allen hit an RBI double and Zack Gelof drove home two with a double in the third inning, giving Oakland a 3–0 lead, however, the Rangers came back to win the series opener 5–3. Ken Waldichuk pitched six innings, allowing two runs and striking out seven in his start.
- August 8 - JJ Bleday hit a solo home run, as the Athletics lost to the Rangers by a score of 6–1. The A's were limited to three hits in the loss.
- August 9 - Zack Gelof hit a home run, while the A's pitching staff held the Rangers to only four hits, as Oakland shut out Texas 2–0. Freddy Tarnok earned his first career win, pitching four shutout innings. The victory snapped the Rangers eight game winning streak.
- August 11 - After an off-day, the Athletics were on the road for a three-game interleague series against the Washington Nationals at Nationals Park in Washington, District of Columbia. Jordan Díaz drove home two runners in the first inning, however, the A's offense struggled for the rest of the game, as Washington defeated Oakland 8–2.
- August 12 - JJ Bleday hit a solo home run in the third inning and Brent Rooker hit a solo homer in the sixth inning, as the A's dropped a close game to the Nationals, losing 3–2.
- August 13 - Zack Gelof hit two home runs and Seth Brown hit a two-run home run, as Oakland took a 7–2 lead into the bottom of the ninth inning. The Nationals made a comeback, scoring six times in the inning, as the A's were swept by the Nationals, losing the game 8–7.
- August 14 - Oakland opened a three-game interleague series on the road against the St. Louis Cardinals at Busch Stadium in St. Louis, Missouri. Seth Brown had two hits and drove home two runners and Esteury Ruiz hit a home run in the A's 7–5 loss to the Cardinals.
- August 15 - Oakland lost their fifth game in a row, losing a 6–2 decision to the Cardinals. Lawrence Butler hit his first career home run, a two-run shot, in the seventh inning. With the loss, the A's have lost seven of their last eight games.
- August 16 - Paul Blackburn pitched seven shutout innings and Zack Gelof had four hits, driving home two runners and scoring a run, as the Athletics blanked the Cardinals 8–0. Esteury Ruiz stole his American League leading 48th base in the win.
- August 18 - After a day off, the Athletics hosted the AL East leading Baltimore Orioles at home for a three-game series. Brent Rooker had three hits and scored two runs and Seth Brown had two hits, driving home two runs, as the A's lost to the Orioles 9–4.
- August 19 - Aledmys Díaz hit two home runs, however, the Orioles scored five runs in the 10th inning, as Oakland lost to Baltimore 7–2.
- August 20 - The Orioles completed the three-game sweep, defeating the A's 12–1. Brent Rooker provided all of the Athletics offense, hitting his 20th home run of the season. The loss was Oakland's 90th of the season.
- August 21 - The A's welcomed the Kansas City Royals for a three-game home series. Brent Rooker hit a game-winning two-run home run in the bottom of the ninth inning, as Oakland defeated Kansas City 6–4. Jordan Díaz, Shea Langeliers and Zack Gelof also hit home runs and Esteury Ruiz stole his 49th base of the season.
- August 22 - Shea Langeliers homered for the second consecutive game and Aledmys Díaz hit a double and drove home three runners, as the Athletics defeated the Royals 5–4.
- August 23 - The Royals pitching staff held the Athletics to only two hits, as Kansas City won the final game of the series 4–0. With the loss, the A's were eliminated from post-season contention.
- August 24 - The A's travelled to Chicago, Illinois for a four-game series at Guaranteed Rate Field against the Chicago White Sox. Shea Langeliers hit two home runs and drove home four runners, while Tony Kemp, Brent Rooker and Zack Gelof each hit a home run, as Oakland defeated the White Sox 8–5 for their third win in their last four games.
- August 25 - Nick Allen had four hits, including a home run, and drove home five runners and Ryan Noda had three hits, also hitting a home run, and drove home three runners, in the Athletics 12–4 victory over the White Sox. Zach Neal earned his first win since August 9, 2016, pitching five innings and allowing only two runs.
- August 26 - Oakland was limited to only four hits, as the A's dropped the third game of the series 6–2 to the White Sox.
- August 27 - The Athletics offense struggled for the second straight game, as they were limited to only two hits in a 6–1 loss to the White Sox. Esteury Ruiz stole two bases, bringing his AL-leading total to 51 on the season.
- August 28 - The A's closed out their seven-game road trip with a three-game series against their divisional rivals, the Seattle Mariners at T-Mobile Park in Seattle, Washington. The Mariners held the Athletics to four hits, as Oakland dropped their third game in a row, losing 7–0.
- August 29 - Oakland's pitching staff held the Mariners to only four hits, as the Athletics defeated Seattle 3–1. Jordan Díaz had three hits, as Shea Langeliers and Seth Brown each hit home runs in the victory.
- August 30 - Esteury Ruiz had two hits, and stole two bases, however, the A's dropped the final game of the series, losing 5–4 to the Mariners. Lawrence Butler had two hits, including a two-run home run.

=== September/October ===
- September 1 - The A's returned home for a three-game series against their divisional rivals, the Los Angeles Angels. Esteury Ruiz had three hits, including a two-run home run, as well as stealing his 54th base of the season, as the Athletics defeated the Angels 9–2. JP Sears pitched six scoreless innings in his start, allowing only four hits, to earn the victory.
- September 2 - Brent Rooker hit a two-run home run in the fourth inning, and the A's pitching staff held the Angels to only one run, as Oakland won the game by a 2–1 score. Paul Blackburn started the game and pitched five innings to earn the victory.
- September 3 - Ryan Noda and Seth Brown each hit a two-run home run in the sixth inning, leading the Athletics to a series sweep, as Oakland defeated the Angels 10–6. Zack Gelof had two hits and scored two runs.
- September 4 - The Athletics hosted the Toronto Blue Jays for a three-game series. Lawrence Butler hit two home runs and drove home three runners, while Ryan Noda and Jordan Díaz each hit home runs, as the A's dropped a close game to the Blue Jays, losing 6–5 in ten innings.
- September 5 - Zack Gelof and Seth Brown each had two hits, and Ken Waldichuk pitched six scoreless innings, however, the A's lost to the Blue Jays 7–1.
- September 6 - Carlos Pérez hit a two-run home run in the fourth inning and Kevin Smith hit a three-run homer in the sixth inning, leading the Athletics to a 5–2 victory over Toronto. Esteury Ruiz stole two bases, bringing his season total to an AL-high of 58 on the season.
- September 8 - After a scheduled off-day, the Athletics were on the road for a three-game series against their divisional rivals, the Texas Rangers, at Globe Life Field in Arlington, Texas. Shea Langeliers hit a two-run home run and Esteury Ruiz hit a solo home run, as Oakland defeated the Rangers 6–3.
- September 9 - Zack Gelof had two hits, including a two-run home run, however, the Rangers won the game, defeating the Athletics 3–2.
- September 10 - Ryan Noda, Seth Brown and Jordan Díaz each had two hits and Tyler Soderstrom hit a solo home run, as Oakland lost the final game of the series 9–4 to the Rangers.
- September 11 - The A's opened a three-game road series against the division leading Houston Astros at Minute Maid Park in Houston, Texas. Ken Waldichuk allowed no hits in six innings coming off of the bullpen. Ryan Noda, Brent Rooker and Shea Langeliers each hit solo home runs, as Oakland shut out the Astros 4–0.
- September 12 - Zack Gelof had two hits and two runs, while Shea Langeliers and Tony Kemp each hit home runs, as the Athletics defeated the Astros 6–2. JP Sears pitched six innings, allowing two runs, earning his fifth victory of the season.
- September 13 - Ryan Noda broke up the Astros no-hit bid with a single in the ninth inning, however, the Athletics lost their 100th game of the season, losing 6–2 to Houston.
- September 15 - Following an off-day, the A's kicked off a 10-game homestand, their final of the season, as the San Diego Padres visited Oakland for a three-game interleague series. In the series opener, Esteury Ruiz hit a home run and stole his AL-leading 59th base, however, the A's lost to the Padres 8–3.
- September 16 - Zack Gelof hit a solo home run as the A's lost 5–2 to the Padres. Tony Kemp and Lawrence Butler each had two hits in the loss.
- September 17 - Brent Rooker had two hits, including a solo home run, however, the Padres completed the three-game sweep against the Athletics, winning the game 10–1.
- September 18 - The A's continue their homestand as they host their divisional rivals, the Seattle Mariners, for a three-game series. Oakland's offense struggled, managing only five singles. Esteury Ruiz stole two bases, bringing his American League leading total to 61 on the season. The Mariners shut out Oakland 5–0, as the Athletics have now lost five games in a row.
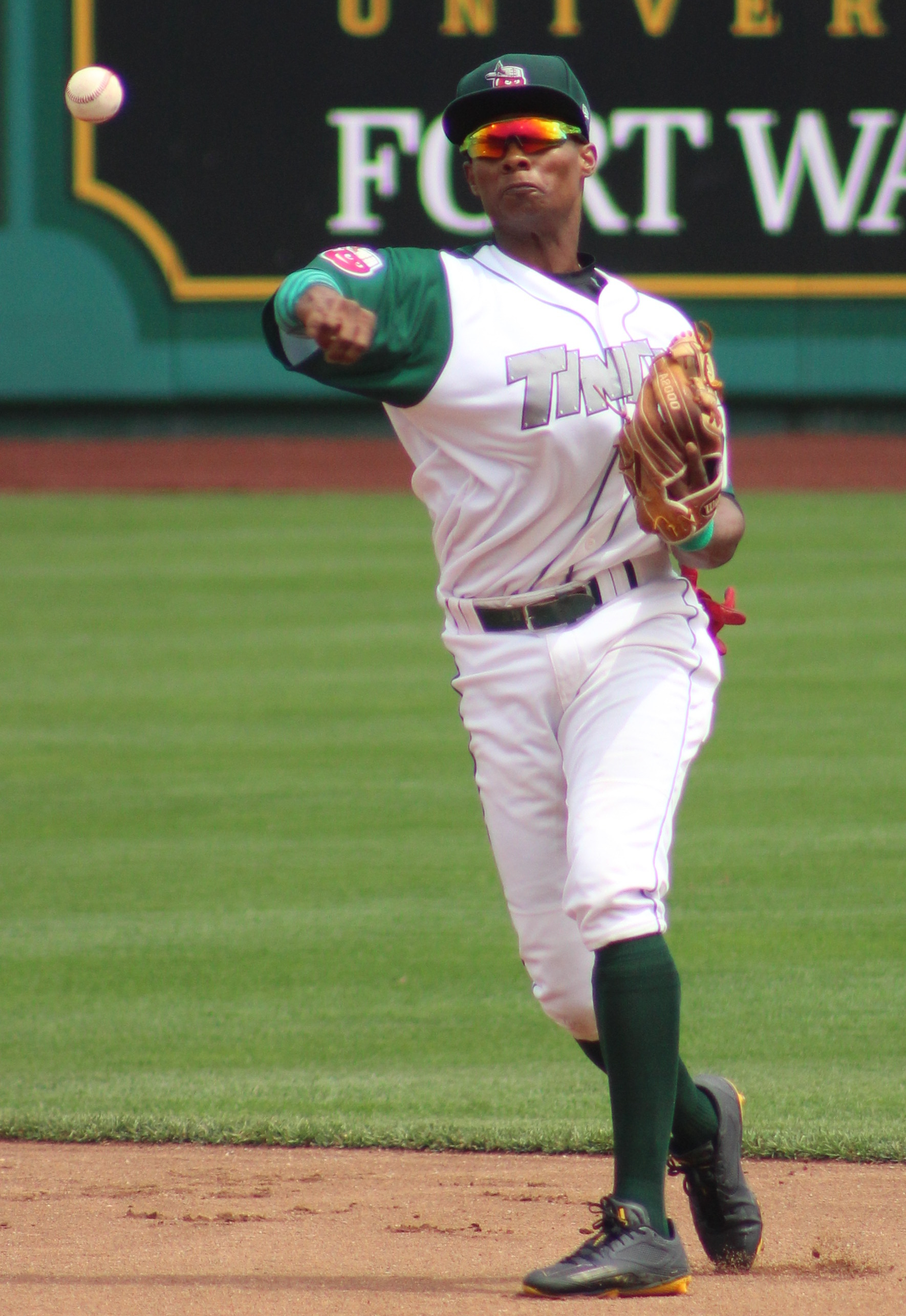
  Esteury Ruiz, seen here with the Fort Wayne TinCaps in 2018, set the Major League rookie season record with 67 stolen bases.
- September 19 - Shea Langeliers hit a triple, driving home Aledmys Díaz and Zack Gelof had two hits, however, the A's lost their sixth game in a row, losing 7–2 to the Mariners.
- September 20 - Brent Rooker and Zack Gelof each hit home runs, but the A's losing streak was extended to seven, as the Mariners swept the three-game series by a score of 6–3.
- September 21 - The Athletics began their final home series of the season, as Oakland hosted the Detroit Tigers for a four-game series. Brent Rooker hit his 28th home run of the season, but the A's lost their eighth game in a row, losing 7–3 to Detroit.
- September 22 - Oakland snapped their eight-game losing streak, as the A's defeated the Tigers 8–2. Ken Waldichuk pitched six innings, allowing four hits and two runs, while striking out seven, to earn the victory. Brent Rooker and Shea Langeliers each hit home runs and Esteury Ruiz stole two bases, bringing his American League high total to 63.
- September 23 - Joe Boyle earned his first career victory, pitching six innings, allowing no earned runs and struck out five batters, as the A's defeated Detroit 4–1. Esteury Ruiz had two hits and scored two runs, while Nick Allen also scored two runs. Trevor May earned his 20th save of the season.
- September 24 - In their final home game of the season, Esteury Ruiz had two hits and stole two bases, bringing his total to 65 on the season, however, the Athletics were shut out by the Tigers 2–0. The A's finished the season with a 26–55 record at home and lost their 108th game of the season, tying the 1979 Oakland Athletics for the most in a season since relocating to Oakland.
- September 26 - The A's were on the road to begin a three-game series against the American League Central champions, the Minnesota Twins, at Target Field in Minneapolis, Minnesota. In the series opener, Seth Brown hit a two-run home run, however, the Athletics lost to the Twins by a score of 11–3. With their 109th loss of the season, it is the most since the franchise moved to Oakland and is the most since the 1916 Philadelphia Athletics season, when the A's lost 117 games.
- September 27 - Brent Rooker had a hit and drove home two runs, however, the A's lost for the 11th time in their past 13 games, losing 6–4 to the Twins.
- September 28 - Ryan Noda hit a solo home run in the eighth inning, helping the Athletics to a 2–1 victory over the Twins. Luis Medina pitched six innings, allowing only three hits and one run.
- September 29 - Oakland headed to Angel Stadium in Anaheim, California for a three-game season ending series against the Los Angeles Angels. Brent Rooker doubled home Zack Gelof for the A's lone run of the game, as the Angels defeated Oakland 5–1.
- September 30 - Zack Gelof had three hits, including a home run, and drove home three runners, as the Athletics defeated the Angels 7–3. Joe Boyle had a strong start, pitching seven innings, allowing three runs and striking out six to improve to 2–0 on the season. Esteury Ruiz stole his AL-leading 66th base in the win.
- October 1 - Esteury Ruiz set the American League record for most stolen bases in a season by a rookie, as he stole his 67th base, breaking the record previously set by Kenny Lofton of the 1992 Cleveland Indians. Brent Rooker had three hits, including his 30th home run of the season, as Oakland lost to the Angels 7–3. With the loss, the A's finish the season with a 50–112 record, earning a 0.309 winning percentage, the lowest in franchise history since the 1919 Philadelphia Athletics, who finished the year with a 0.257 winning percentage.

== Transactions ==
=== March ===
March 30	Placed C Manny Piña (sprained left wrist) on the 10-day injured list retroactive to March 27, 2023. Placed RHP's Drew Rucinski (strained left hamstring), Paul Blackburn (right middle fingernail avulsion) and Freddy Tarnok (strained right shoulder) on the 15-day injured list retroactive to March 27, 2023. Recalled Adrián Martínez from Las Vegas Aviators. Selected the contract of C Carlos Pérez from Las Vegas Aviators. Optioned RHP Chad Smith and SS Kevin Smith to Las Vegas Aviators.

=== April ===
April 7	Signed free agent RHP's Spencer Patton and Zach Neal and LHP John Beller to a minor league contract. Sent RHP Paul Blackburn on a rehab assignment to Stockton Ports.
April 10	Placed RF Seth Brown (left oblique strain) on the 10-day injured list retroactive to April 9. Recalled SS Kevin Smith from Las Vegas Aviators.
April 11	Sent RHP Paul Blackburn on a rehab assignment to Las Vegas Aviators.
April 12	Placed RHP Domingo Acevedo (left back strain) on the 15-day injured list retroactive to April 11. Recalled RHP Chad Smith from Las Vegas Aviators. Sent RHP Drew Rucinski on a rehab assignment to Las Vegas Aviators.
April 13	Claimed LHP Richard Lovelady off waivers from Atlanta Braves and optioned him to Las Vegas Aviators. Transferred RHP Freddy Tarnok (strained right shoulder) from the 15-day injured list to the 60-day injured list.
April 14	Designated OF Cal Stevenson for assignment. Optioned RHP Adam Oller and SS Nick Allen to Las Vegas Aviators. Selected the contracts of LHP Hogan Harris and 2B Tyler Wade from Las Vegas Aviators.
April 15	Optioned LHP Hogan Harris to Las Vegas Aviators. Recalled LHP Richard Lovelady from Las Vegas Aviators.
April 18	Placed RHP Dany Jiménez (right shoulder strain) on the 15-day injured list retroactive to April 17. Recalled RHP Adam Oller from Las Vegas Aviators.
April 19	Placed CF Ramón Laureano (strained left groin) on the 10-day injured list retroactive to April 17. Placed RHP Trevor May (anxiety) on the 15-day injured list. Transferred RHP Dany Jiménez from the 15-day injured list to the 60-day injured list. Activated RHP Mason Miller and selected his contract from Las Vegas Aviators. Recalled 3B Jordan Díaz from Las Vegas Aviators. Traded OF Cal Stevenson to San Francisco Giants for cash.
April 21	Sent C Manny Piña on a rehab assignment to Stockton Ports.
April 22	Signed free agent RHP Aaron Wilkerson to a minor league contract.
April 23	San Francisco Giants traded LHP Sam Long to Oakland Athletics for cash.
April 24	Designated 3B Dermis García for assignment. Placed RHP Adrián Martínez on the 15-day injured list retroactive to April 23. Activated LHP Sam Long.
April 25	Sent C Manny Piña on a rehab assignment to Las Vegas Aviators. Optioned RHP James Kaprielian to Las Vegas Aviators. Recalled RHP Luis Medina from Las Vegas Aviators.
April 26	Sent 3B Dermis García outright to Las Vegas Aviators.
April 27	Optioned RHP Luis Medina to Las Vegas Aviators. Activated RHP Domingo Acevedo from the 15-day injured list. Sent CF Ramón Laureano on a rehab assignment to Las Vegas Aviators.
April 28	Optioned RHP Chad Smith to Las Vegas Aviators. Activated RHP Drew Rucinski from the 15-day injured list.
April 29	Designated 2B Tyler Wade for assignment. Activated CF Ramón Laureano from the 10-day injured list.

=== May ===
May 1	Sent 2B Tyler Wade outright to Las Vegas Aviators.
May 2	Placed SS Aledmys Díaz (strained left hamstring) on the 10-day injured list retroactive to April 30. Recalled SS Nick Allen from Las Vegas Aviators. Sent RHP's Trevor May and Paul Blackburn on rehab assignments to Las Vegas Aviators.
May 3	Optioned CF Conner Capel to Las Vegas Aviators. Recalled OF JJ Bleday from Las Vegas Aviators.
May 4	Optioned RHP Adam Oller to Las Vegas Aviators. Designated RHP's Domingo Acevedo and Jeurys Familia for assignment. Selected the contracts of RHP's Spencer Patton, Austin Pruitt and Rico Garcia from Las Vegas Aviators.
May 6	Sent RHP Domingo Acevedo outright to Las Vegas Aviators. Released RHP Jeurys Familia.
May 9	Sent RHP Adrián Martínez on a rehab assignment to Las Vegas Aviators.
May 11	Placed C Manny Piña on the 60-day injured list. Placed RHP Mason Miller (tightness in right forearm) on the 15-day injured list retroactive to May 8. Optioned RHP Rico Garcia to Las Vegas Aviators. Recalled RHP Luis Medina from Las Vegas Aviators. Selected the contract of RHP Zach Neal from Las Vegas Aviators.
May 12	Traded 3B Pablo Reyes to Boston Red Sox for cash.
May 13	Designated RHP Spencer Patton for assignment. Recalled RHP James Kaprielian from Las Vegas Aviators.
May 14	Optioned RHP James Kaprielian and SS Kevin Smith to Las Vegas Aviators. Activated SS Aledmys Díaz from the 10-day injured list. Selected the contract of RHP Garrett Acton from Las Vegas Aviators.
May 15	Optioned RHP Zach Neal to Las Vegas Aviators. Sent RHP Spencer Patton outright to Las Vegas Aviators. Activated RHP Adrián Martínez from the 15-day injured list.
May 16	Sent RHP Trevor May on a rehab assignment to Las Vegas Aviators.
May 17	Acquired RHP Lucas Erceg from Milwaukee Brewers for cash. Sent RF Seth Brown on a rehab assignment to Stockton Ports.
May 19	Designated RHP Zach Neal for assignment. Placed RHP Zach Jackson (flexor tendon strain in right elbow) on the 15-day injured list retroactive to May 17. Selected the contract of Lucas Erceg from Las Vegas Aviators.
May 20	Sent RHP Zach Neal outright to Las Vegas Aviators. Recalled RHP James Kaprielian from Las Vegas Aviators.
May 22	Optioned 3B Jordan Díaz to Las Vegas Aviators. Activated RF Seth Brown from the 10-day injured list.
May 23	Optioned LHP Kyle Muller to Las Vegas Aviators. Activated RHP Trevor May from the 15-day injured list.
May 27	Optioned RHP Adrián Martínez to Las Vegas Aviators. Recalled LHP Hogan Harris from Las Vegas Aviators.
May 29	Designated 1B Jesús Aguilar for assignment. Optioned RHP Garrett Acton to Las Vegas Aviators. Activated RHP Paul Blackburn from the 15-day injured list. Recalled 3B Jonah Bride from Las Vegas Aviators.

=== June ===
June 4	Released 1B Jesús Aguilar.
June 6	Optioned SS Nick Allen to Las Vegas Aviators. Recalled SS Kevin Smith from Las Vegas Aviators. Sent LHP Kirby Snead on a rehab assignment to ACL Athletics.
June 9	Sent RHP Freddy Tarnok on a rehab assignment to ACL Athletics.
June 14	Sent LHP Kirby Snead on a rehab assignment to Las Vegas Aviators.
June 15	Sent RHP Freddy Tarnok on a rehab assignment to Las Vegas Aviators.
June 16	Placed LHP Richard Lovelady (strained left elbow) on the 15-day injured list. Recalled RHP Chad Smith from Las Vegas Aviators.
June 17	Placed SS Kevin Smith (strained back) on the 10-day injured list retroactive to June 16. Selected the contract of 2B Tyler Wade from Las Vegas Aviators.
June 18	Acquired RHP Yacksel Ríos from the Atlanta Braves for cash.
June 20	Transferred RHP Drew Rucinski (stomach illness) from the 15-day injured list to the 60-day injured list. Optioned RHP Chad Smith to Las Vegas Aviators. Selected the contract of Yacksel Ríos from Las Vegas Aviators.
June 21	Transferred RHP Zach Jackson (flexon tendon strain in right elbow) from the 15-day injured list to the 60-day injured list. Claimed RHP Angel Felipe off of waivers from San Diego Padres and optioned him to Las Vegas Aviators.
June 23	Placed CF Ramón Laureano (right hand fracture) on the 10-day injured list. Recalled CF Conner Capel from Las Vegas Aviators.
June 30	Placed RHP James Kaprielian (right shoulder strain) on the 15-day injured list retroactive to June 27. Placed RHP Yacksel Ríos (Raynaud's syndrome) on the 15-day injured list retroactive to June 29. Optioned 3B Jonah Bride to Las Vegas Aviators. Transferred RHP Mason Miller (tightness in right forearm) from the 15-day injured list to the 60-day injured list. Activated LHP Kirby Snead from the 60-day injured list. Recalled RHP Rico Garcia and 3B Jordan Diaz from the Las Vegas Aviators. Sent C Manny Piña and LHP Richard Lovelady on rehab assignments to Stockton Ports.

=== July ===
July 1	Optioned LHP Kirby Snead to Las Vegas Aviators. Recalled LHP Kyle Muller from Las Vegas Aviators.
July 2	Optioned LHP Kyle Muller to Las Vegas Aviators. Activated LHP Richard Lovelady from the 15-day injured list.
July 4	Designated RHP Chad Smith for assignment. Placed C Carlos Pérez (fractured left thumb) on the 10-day injured list retroactive to July 2. Optioned CF Conner Capel to Las Vegas Aviators. Activated C Manny Piña from the 60-day injured list. Recalled SS Nick Allen from Las Vegas Aviators.
July 7	Designated RHP Rico Garcia for assignment and optioned him to Las Vegas Aviators. Placed 2B Esteury Ruiz (right shoulder subluxation) on the 10-day injured list retroactive to July 6. Recalled RHP Angel Felipe from Las Vegas Aviators. Selected the contract of CF Cody Thomas from Las Vegas Aviators.
July 8	Activated RHP Freddy Tarnok from the 60-day injured list and optioned him to the Las Vegas Aviators. Transferred RHP Yacksel Rios (Raynaud's Syndrome) from the 15-day injured list to the 60-day injured list.
July 10	Sent RHP Rico Garcia outright to Las Vegas Aviators.
July 12	RHP Adam Oller claimed off of waivers by Seattle Mariners.
July 14	Placed C Manny Piña (left wrist contusion) on the 10-day injured list retroactive to July 11. Placed LHP Richard Lovelady (strained left forearm) on the 15-day injured list retroactive to July 11. Sent 2B Tyler Wade outright to Las Vegas Aviators. Recalled RHP Freddy Tarnok from Las Vegas Aviators. Selected the contracts of C Tyler Soderstrom and 3B Zack Gelof from Las Vegas Aviators.
July 17	Signed SS Jacob Wilson.
July 18	Sent CF Ramón Laureano on a rehab assignment to Las Vegas Aviators.
July 19	Traded RHP Shintaro Fujinami to the Baltimore Orioles for LHP Easton Lucas. Claimed RHP Tayler Scott off waivers from the Boston Red Sox. Released RHP Garrett Acton. Sent RHP Dany Jiménez on a rehab assignment to Las Vegas Aviators.
July 20	Placed 1B Ryan Noda (fractured mandible) on the 10-day injured list retroactive to July 19, 2023. Recalled 3B Jonah Bride from Las Vegas Aviators.
July 21	Signed LHP Diego Barrera. Signed RHP Ryan Brown.
July 22	Placed RHP Ángel Felipe on the paternity list. Selected the contract of RHP Chad Smith from Las Vegas Aviators.
July 23	Sent C Manny Piña on a rehab assignment to Stockton Ports.
July 24	Optioned 3B Jonah Bride to Las Vegas Aviators.
July 25	Optioned RHP Chad Smith to Las Vegas Aviators. Activated Ángel Felipe from the paternity list. Activated Ramón Laureano from the 10-day injured list.
July 26	Sent RHP Zach Jackson on a rehab assignment to Stockton Ports.
July 27	Sent 2B Esteury Ruiz and SS Kevin Smith on rehab assignments to Las Vegas Aviators.
July 31	Traded LHP Sam Moll to the Cincinnati Reds for RHP Joe Boyle. Traded 2B Jace Peterson and cash to the Arizona Diamondbacks for RHP Chad Patrick. Designated C Manny Piña for assignment.

=== August ===
August 1	Recalled LHP Kirby Snead from Las Vegas Aviators. Selected the contract of 2B Tyler Wade from Las Vegas Aviators.
August 3	Designated 2B Tyler Wade for assignment. Optioned LHP Hogan Harris to Las Vegas Aviators. Selected the contract of RHP Zach Neal from Las Vegas Aviators. Recalled 3B Jonah Bride from Las Vegas Aviators.
August 4	Released C Manny Piña. Sent 2B Tyler Wade outright to Las Vegas Aviators.
August 5	Designated CF Ramón Laureano for assignment. Optioned RHP Tayler Scott to Las Vegas Aviators. Activated SS Kevin Smith from the 10-day injured list and assigned him to Las Vegas Aviators. Activated 2B Esteury Ruiz from the 10-day injured list and RHP Dany Jiménez from the 60-day injured list.
August 7	Cleveland Guardians claimed CF Ramón Laureano off waivers.'
August 8	Claimed RHP Spenser Watkins off waivers from Houston Astros and optioned him to Las Vegas Aviators. Optioned RHP Dany Jiménez to Las Vegas Aviators. Recalled RHP Adrián Martínez from Las Vegas Aviators. Sent C Carlos Pérez on a rehab assignment to Las Vegas Aviators.
August 11	Placed LF Tony Kemp on the paternity list. Recalled 1B Lawrence Butler from Las Vegas Aviators.
August 12	Optioned LHP Sam Long to Las Vegas Aviators. Selected the contract of LHP Francisco Pérez from Las Vegas Aviators.
August 14	Placed RHP Freddy Tarnok (right calf strain) on the 15-day injured list retroactive to August 11. Optioned CF Cody Thomas to Las Vegas Aviators. Activated LF Tony Kemp from the paternity list. Recalled RHP Spenser Watkins from Las Vegas Aviators.
August 15	Placed OF JJ Bleday (left knee sprain) on the 10-day injured list retroactive to August 14. Placed RHP Angel Felipe (right elbow sprain) on the 15-day injured list. Sent 1B Ryan Noda on a rehab assignment to Las Vegas Aviators. Recalled RHP Tayler Scott from Las Vegas Aviators.
August 16	Optioned RHP Spenser Watkins to Las Vegas Aviators. Recalled LHP Kyle Muller from Las Vegas Aviators.
August 20	Placed RHP Austin Pruitt (right forearm strain) on the 15-day injured list retroactive to August 17. Recalled RHP Dany Jiménez from Las Vegas Aviators.
August 21	Placed RHP Luis Medina (right index finger blister) on the 15-day injured list retroactive to August 19. Optioned C Tyler Soderstrom to Las Vegas Aviators. Activated 1B Ryan Noda from the 10-day injured list. Selected the contract of RHP Spencer Patton from Las Vegas Aviators. Transferred RHP James Kaprielian from the 15-day injured list to the 60-day injured list. Traded CF Trenton Brooks to the San Francisco Giants for LHP Sean Newcomb.
August 22	Optioned RHP Tayler Scott to Las Vegas Aviators. Recalled LHP Hogan Harris from Las Vegas Aviators.
August 23	Optioned LHP Hogan Harris to Las Vegas Aviators. Recalled LHP Sean Newcomb from Las Vegas Aviators. Transferred LHP Richard Lovelady (strained left foreman) from the 15-day injured list to the 60-day injured list. Sent RHP Mason Miller on a rehab assignment to Las Vegas Aviators.
August 30	Sent RHP Spenser Watkins and CF's Conner Capel and Cody Thomas outright to Las Vegas Aviators. Sent RHP Luis Medina on a rehab assignment to Las Vegas Aviators.

=== September ===
September 1	Recalled LHP Sam Long and C Tyler Soderstrom from Las Vegas Aviators.
September 2	Claimed RHP Devin Sweet off waivers from the Seattle Mariners and optioned him to Las Vegas Aviators.
September 4	Optioned LHP Kirby Snead to Las Vegas Aviators. Activated RHP Luis Mendina from the 15-day injured list.
September 5	Placed 1B Lawrence Butler on the bereavement list. Recalled SS Kevin Smith from Las Vegas Aviators.
September 6	Designated RHP Spencer Patton for assignment. Optioned LHP Sam Long and RHP Zach Neal to Las Vegas Aviators. Activated RHP Mason Miller from the 60-day injured list. Recalled RHP Devin Sweet from Las Vegas Aviators. Selected the contract of LHP Easton Lucas from Las Vegas Aviators.
September 8	Sent RHP Spencer Patton outright to Las Vegas Aviators. Optioned 3B Jonah Bride to Las Vegas Aviators. Activated 1B Lawrence Butler from the bereavement list.
September 9	Claimed 3B Buddy Kennedy off of waivers from Arizona Diamondbacks and optioned him to Las Vegas Aviators.
September 17	Placed LHP Sean Newcomb (sprained left knee) on the 15-day injured list retroactive to September 16. Transferred RHP Freddy Tarnok from the 15-day injured list to the 60-day injured list. Selected the contract of RHP Joe Boyle from Las Vegas Aviators.
September 19	Sent RHP Austin Pruitt on a rehab assignment to Las Vegas Aviators.
September 20	Transferred LHP Sean Newcomb (sprained left knee) from the 15-day injured list to the 60-day injured list. Optioned RHP Devin Sweet to Las Vegas Aviators. Selected the contract of RHP Joey Estes from Las Vegas Aviators.
September 22	Optioned LHP Easton Lucas to Las Vegas Aviators. Recalled RHP Zach Neal from Las Vegas Aviators.
September 26	Optioned SS Kevin Smith to Las Vegas Aviators. Activated OF JJ Bleday from the 10-day injured list.

== Roster ==
2023 Oakland Athletics
Roster
Pitchers: 68 Domingo Acevedo; 67 Garrett Acton; 58 Paul Blackburn; 35 Joe Boyle; 70 Lucas Erceg; 68 Joey Estes; 31 Jeurys Familia; 53 Ángel Felipe; 11 Shintaro Fujinami; 50 Rico Garcia; 63 Hogan Harris; 61 Zach Jackson; 56 Dany Jiménez; 32 James Kaprielian; 66 Sam Long; 45 Richard Lovelady; 67 Easton Lucas; 55 Adrián Martínez; 65 Trevor May; 46 Luis Medina; 57 Mason Miller; 60 Sam Moll; 39 Kyle Muller; 31 Zach Neal; 16 Sean Newcomb; 36 Adam Oller; 60 Francisco Pérez; 19 Spencer Patton; 29 Austin Pruitt; 40 Yacksel Ríos; 47 Drew Rucinski; 50 Tayler Scott; 38 JP Sears; 30 Chad Smith; 54 Kirby Snead; 17 Devin Sweet; 62 Freddy Tarnok; 64 Ken Waldichuk; 36 Spenser Watkins	Catchers: 23 Shea Langeliers; 44 Carlos Pérez; 28 Manny Piña; 37 Tyler Soderstrom; Infielders: 99 Jesús Aguilar; 2 Nick Allen; 26 Jonah Bride; 12 Aledmys Díaz; 13 Jordan Díaz; 20 Zack Gelof; 49 Ryan Noda; 6 Jace Peterson; 4 Kevin Smith; 8 Tyler Wade	Outfielders: 33 JJ Bleday; 15 Seth Brown; 22 Lawrence Butler; 21 Conner Capel; 5 Tony Kemp; 22 Ramón Laureano; 25 Brent Rooker; 1 Esteury Ruiz; 48 Cody Thomas	Manager: 7 Mark Kotsay; Coaches: 18 Mike Aldrete (first base); 51 Darren Bush (bench); 90 Wilkin Castillo (bullpen catcher); 41 Chris Cron (assistant hitting); 14 Scott Emerson (pitching); 52 Tommy Everidge (hitting); 91 Dustin Hughes (bullpen catcher); 59 Marcus Jensen (quality control); 3 Eric Martins (third base); 71 Mike McCarthy (bullpen)

== Player statistics ==
= Indicates team leader

= Indicates league leader

=== Batting ===
Note: G = Games played; AB = At bats; R = Runs; H = Hits; 2B = Doubles; 3B = Triples; HR = Home runs; RBI = Runs batted in; SB = Stolen bases; BB = Walks; AVG = Batting average; SLG = Slugging average

Player	G	AB	R	H	2B	3B	HR	RBI	SB	BB	AVG	SLG
Brent Rooker	137	463	61	114	20	1	30	69	4	49	.246	.488
Esteury Ruiz	132	449	47	114	24	1	5	47	67	20	.254	.345
Shea Langeliers	135	448	52	92	19	4	22	63	3	34	.205	.413
Ryan Noda	128	406	63	93	22	1	16	54	3	77	.229	.406
Tony Kemp	124	359	42	75	13	3	5	27	15	44	.209	.304
Seth Brown	112	343	33	76	19	1	14	52	3	30	.222	.405
Aledmys Díaz	109	315	25	72	20	1	4	24	1	17	.229	.337
Nick Allen	106	303	29	67	4	2	4	20	5	17	.221	.287
Jace Peterson	92	281	30	62	7	2	6	28	11	36	.221	.324
Jordan Díaz	90	272	20	60	9	0	10	27	0	17	.221	.364
Zack Gelof	69	270	40	72	20	1	14	32	14	26	.267	.504
JJ Bleday	82	256	35	50	11	0	10	27	5	42	.195	.355
Ramón Laureano	64	225	24	48	10	3	6	21	8	17	.213	.364
Carlos Pérez	66	168	17	38	4	0	6	20	0	13	.226	.357
Kevin Smith	49	135	15	25	4	0	5	11	1	5	.185	.326
Tyler Soderstrom	45	125	9	20	1	0	3	7	0	11	.160	.240
Lawrence Butler	42	123	10	26	4	0	4	10	0	4	.211	.341
Jesús Aguilar	36	104	8	23	2	0	5	9	0	8	.221	.385
Jonah Bride	40	88	9	15	3	0	0	7	0	11	.170	.205
Conner Capel	32	73	6	19	5	0	0	3	5	12	.260	.329
Tyler Wade	26	51	8	13	1	1	0	2	4	4	.255	.314
Cody Thomas	19	42	1	10	3	0	1	2	0	4	.238	.381
Manny Piña	4	12	1	3	0	0	1	1	0	0	.250	.500
Totals	162	5311	585	1187	225	21	171	563	149	498	.223	.370
Rank in AL	—	15	15	15	14	9	11	15	4	11	15	15

Source:Baseball Reference

=== Pitching ===
Note: W = Wins; L = Losses; ERA = Earned run average; G = Games pitched; GS = Games started; SV = Saves; IP = Innings pitched; H = Hits; R = Runs allowed; ER = Earned runs allowed; BB = Walks allowed; SO = Strikeouts

Player	W	L	ERA	G	GS	SV	IP	H	R	ER	BB	SO
JP Sears	5	14	4.54	32	32	0	172.1	165	90	87	53	161
Ken Waldichuk	4	9	5.36	35	22	1	141.1	149	93	84	71	132
Luis Medina	3	10	5.42	23	17	0	109.2	109	73	66	57	106
Paul Blackburn	4	7	4.43	21	20	0	103.2	117	54	51	43	104
Kyle Muller	1	5	7.60	21	13	0	77.0	112	65	65	39	56
Hogan Harris	3	6	7.14	14	6	0	63.0	67	51	50	28	56
James Kaprielian	2	6	6.34	14	11	0	61.0	66	45	43	31	57
Lucas Erceg	4	4	4.75	50	0	0	55.0	51	33	29	36	68
Adrián Martínez	0	2	4.75	22	1	0	55.0	59	31	29	19	47
Shintaro Fujinami	5	8	8.57	34	7	0	49.1	52	48	47	30	51
Austin Pruitt	2	6	2.98	38	6	0	48.1	44	18	16	12	30
Trevor May	4	4	3.28	49	0	21	46.2	35	21	17	29	40
Sam Long	0	1	5.60	40	1	2	45.0	49	29	28	21	32
Sam Moll	0	3	4.54	45	1	1	37.2	34	20	19	19	46
Mason Miller	0	3	3.78	10	6	0	33.1	24	15	14	16	38
Zach Neal	1	1	6.67	14	2	0	27.0	30	22	20	14	25
Richard Lovelady	0	3	4.63	27	0	0	23.1	15	13	12	10	24
Dany Jiménez	0	2	3.47	25	1	1	23.1	11	9	9	14	21
Adam Oller	1	1	10.07	9	1	0	19.2	29	24	22	12	13
Zach Jackson	2	1	2.50	19	0	1	18.0	18	7	5	10	23
Drew Rucinski	0	4	9.00	4	4	0	18.0	27	22	18	14	6
Francisco Pérez	1	2	5.94	17	1	0	16.2	17	12	11	8	14
Joe Boyle	2	0	1.69	3	3	0	16.0	8	4	3	5	15
Ángel Felipe	1	1	4.20	14	0	0	15.0	6	7	7	13	19
Sean Newcomb	1	1	3.00	7	2	0	15.0	8	5	5	9	17
Freddy Tarnok	1	1	4.91	5	1	0	14.2	11	8	8	11	14
Chad Smith	1	2	6.59	10	0	0	13.2	15	10	10	7	9
Jeurys Familia	0	1	6.39	14	0	2	12.2	13	12	9	13	9
Spencer Patton	0	0	5.11	12	0	0	12.1	13	7	7	6	7
Kirby Snead	1	2	4.63	15	0	0	11.2	14	7	6	6	9
Joey Estes	0	1	7.20	2	2	0	10.0	12	9	8	2	7
Domingo Acevedo	0	0	10.61	9	0	0	9.1	16	11	11	2	7
Rico Garcia	0	0	8.31	7	0	0	8.2	13	8	8	5	6
Tayler Scott	0	0	3.38	8	1	0	8.0	11	3	3	2	7
Devin Sweet	1	0	10.80	5	0	0	6.2	8	8	8	5	5
Easton Lucas	0	0	8.10	6	0	0	6.2	10	6	6	4	7
Garrett Acton	0	0	12.71	6	0	0	5.2	9	8	8	5	5
Spenser Watkins	0	1	10.38	1	1	0	4.1	7	5	5	2	4
Jace Peterson	0	0	9.00	2	0	0	2.0	3	2	2	3	1
Carlos Pérez	0	0	10.80	2	0	0	1.2	4	2	2	2	0
Yacksel Ríos	0	0	37.80	3	0	0	1.2	3	7	7	6	2
Totals	50	112	5.48	162	162	29	1419.2	1464	924	865	694	1300
Rank in AL	15	1	15	—	—	13	14	15	15	15	15	14

Source:Baseball Reference

== Farm system ==
Level	Team	League	Division	Manager	Record
AAA	Las Vegas Aviators	Pacific Coast League	West	Fran Riordan	
AA	Midland RockHounds	Texas League	South	Bobby Crosby	
High-A	Lansing Lugnuts	Midwest League	East	Craig Conklin	
Low-A	Stockton Ports	California League	North	Gregorio Petit	
Rookie	ACL Athletics	Arizona Complex League	East	Adam Rosales	
Rookie	DSL Athletics	Dominican Summer League	Northwest	Cooper Goldby	
