= Ángel Felipe =

Dominican baseball player (born 1997)

Acereros de Monclova – No. 53
- Pitcher
- Born: August 30, 1997 (age 29); Villa Mella, Dominican Republic
- Bats: Right Throws: Right

MLB debut
- July 7, 2023, for the Oakland Athletics

MLB statistics (through 2023 season)
- Win–loss record: 1–1
- Earned run average: 4.20
- Strikeouts: 19
- Stats at Baseball Reference

Teams
- Oakland Athletics (2023)

Ángel Alberto Felipe (born August 30, 1997) is a Dominican professional baseball pitcher for the Acereros de Monclova of the Mexican League. He has previously played in Major League Baseball (MLB) for the Oakland Athletics. He made his MLB debut in 2023.

== Professional career ==
=== Tampa Bay Rays ===
Felipe signed with the Tampa Bay Rays as an international free agent on June 15, 2015. He spent his first two professional seasons with the Dominican Summer League Rays, accumulating a 5.35 ERA across 20 total appearances. Felipe spent the 2017 and 2018 seasons with the rookie–level Gulf Coast League Rays. However, he struggled both years, posting a 14.25 ERA with 14 strikeouts in 2017, and a 6.17 ERA with 26 strikeouts in 2018.

In 2019, Felipe spent the year with the rookie–level Princeton Rays, pitching in 15 contests and recording a 4.45 ERA with 36 strikeouts across 30 1/3 innings pitched. He did not play in a game in 2020 due to the cancellation of the minor league season because of the COVID-19 pandemic. Felipe returned to action in 2021 with the Single–A Charleston RiverDogs and High–A Bowling Green Hot Rods. In 36 games between the two affiliates, he logged a 2.59 ERA with 78 strikeouts and 8 saves across 62 2/3 innings of work. Felipe elected free agency following the season on November 7, 2021.

=== San Diego Padres ===
On January 4, 2022, Felipe signed a minor league contract with the San Diego Padres organization. He made 51 relief appearances split between the Double–A San Antonio Missions and Triple–A El Paso Chihuahuas, registering a 5–6 record and 3.63 ERA with 84 strikeouts and 14 saves. The Padres added him to their 40-man roster on August 30.

Felipe was optioned to the Triple-A El Paso Chihuahuas to begin the 2023 season. In 20 games for the Chihuahuas, he recorded a 6.20 ERA with 39 strikeouts and 1 save across 24 2/3 innings pitched. On June 18, 2023, Felipe was designated for assignment following the promotion of Preston Tucker.

=== Oakland Athletics ===
On June 21, 2023, Felipe was claimed off waivers by the Oakland Athletics. In five games for the Triple–A Las Vegas Aviators, he logged a 1.80 ERA with seven strikeouts in five innings pitched. On July 7, Felipe was promoted to the major leagues for the first time. He made 14 relief outings for Oakland in his rookie campaign, posting a 4.20 ERA with 19 strikeouts across 15.0 innings pitched. Felipe's season ended prematurely when he was placed on the injured list with a sprained UCL on August 15.

On March 14, 2024, it was announced that Felipe would undergo Tommy John surgery, ending his season. He was designated for assignment by Oakland two days later. Felipe was released by the Athletics organization on March 18.

=== Los Angeles Angels ===
On March 27, 2024, Felipe signed a minor league contract with the Los Angeles Angels. He did not appear for the organization during the season as he continued to recover from surgery.

Felipe returned to action in 2025 with the Single-A Inland Empire 66ers and Triple-A Salt Lake Bees, but struggled to an 0–1 record and 8.71 ERA with 42 strikeouts over 33 appearances. He elected free agency following the season on November 6, 2025.

=== Acereros de Monclova ===
On May 6, 2026, Felipe signed with the Acereros de Monclova of the Mexican League.
