= Dermis García =

Dominican baseball player (born 1998)

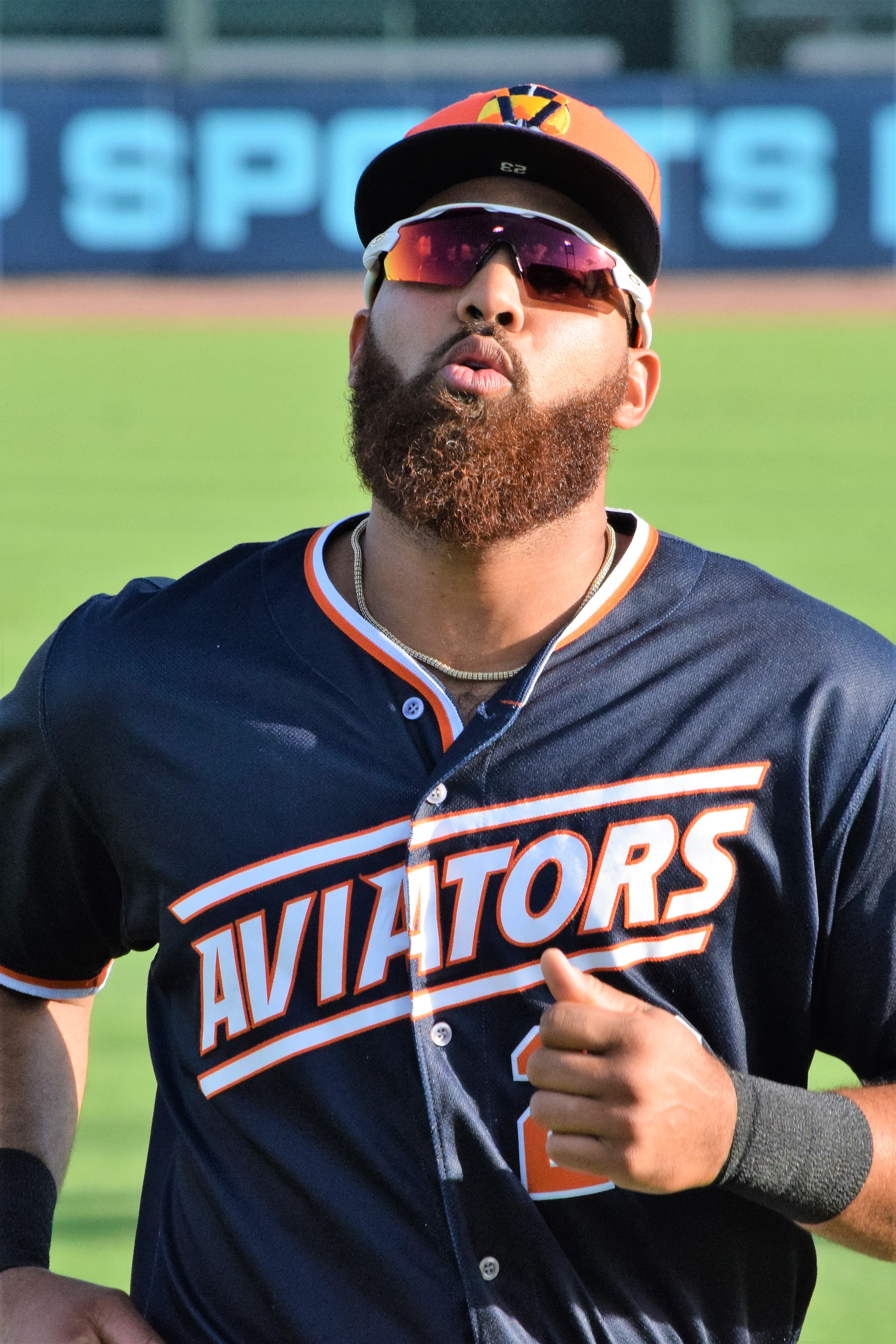
- García with the Las Vegas Aviators in 2023

Hanshin Tigers – No. 94
- First baseman
- Born: January 7, 1998 (age 28); Santo Domingo, Dominican Republic
- Bats: Right Throws: Right

Professional debut
- MLB: July 12, 2022, for the Oakland Athletics
- NPB: July 24, 2026, for the Hanshin Tigers

MLB statistics (through 2022 season)
- Batting average: .207
- Home runs: 5
- Runs batted in: 20

NPB statistics (through August 19, 2026)
- Batting average: .160
- Home runs: 2
- Runs batted in: 7
- Stats at Baseball Reference

Teams
- Oakland Athletics (2022); Hanshin Tigers (2026–present)

Dermis García Hernandez (born January 7, 1998) is a Dominican professional baseball infielder for the Hanshin Tigers of the Nippon Professional Baseball (NPB). He has previously played in Major League Baseball (MLB) for the Oakland Athletics.

== Career ==
=== New York Yankees ===
García was considered to be the best available free agent in the 2014 international signing class. He signed with the New York Yankees for a $3.2 million signing bonus. García spent seven seasons in the Yankees’ farm system, minus the missed 2020 season because of the COVID-19 pandemic, and appeared for the rookie-level Gulf Coast Yankees, the rookie-level Pulaski Yankees, the Single-A Charleston RiverDogs, the High-A Tampa Tarpons, and the Double-A Somerset Patriots. In 469 games played for the affiliates, García had a .230 batting average, 101 home runs, and 276 runs batted in (RBI).

=== Oakland Athletics ===
On March 11, 2022, García signed a minor league contract with the Oakland Athletics, receiving a non-roster invitation to spring training. He began the 2022 season with the Triple-A Las Vegas Aviators. The Athletics promoted García to the major leagues on July 10, and he made his MLB debut on July 12, batting 1-for-3 with two strikeouts. On August 30, García hit his first career home run, a two–run shot off of Washington Nationals starter Erick Fedde. Appearing in 39 games during his rookie campaign, García slashed .207/.264/.388 with five home runs and 20 RBIs.

García was optioned to Triple-A Las Vegas to begin the 2023 season. Playing in 16 games for the Aviators, he hit .242/.329/.500 with three home runs and 12 RBIs. On April 24, García was designated for assignment after Sam Long was added to the roster. He cleared waivers and was sent outright to Las Vegas on April 26. García was released by the Athletics organization on June 16.

=== Algodoneros de Unión Laguna ===
On June 27, 2023, García signed with the Algodoneros de Unión Laguna of the Mexican League. In 3 games for Unión Laguna, he went 1–for–14 (.071) with no home runs or RBI.

=== Washington Nationals ===
On December 13, 2023, García signed a minor league contract with the Washington Nationals. In 108 appearances for the Double-A Harrisburg Senators, he batted .182/.274/.332 with 14 home runs, 38 RBI, and two stolen bases. García elected free agency following the season on November 4, 2024.

=== Charleston Dirty Birds ===
On March 11, 2025, García signed with the Charleston Dirty Birds of the Atlantic League of Professional Baseball. In 2 games for the Dirty Birds he went 0 for 7.

=== Kōchi Fighting Dogs ===
On January 14, 2026, the Kōchi Fighting Dogs of the Shikoku Island League Plus, an independent league in Japan, announced that they had signed a contract with García.

=== Hanshin Tigers ===
On July 21, 2026, García signed with the Hanshin Tigers of Nippon Professional Baseball.

== See also ==
- List of Major League Baseball players from the Dominican Republic
