= Garrett Acton =

American baseball player (born 1998)

Minnesota Twins – No. 50
- Pitcher
- Born: June 15, 1998 (age 28); Naperville, Illinois, U.S.
- Bats: Left Throws: Right

MLB debut
- May 14, 2023, for the Oakland Athletics

MLB statistics (through 2026 season)
- Win–loss record: 1–1
- Earned run average: 7.64
- Strikeouts: 19
- Stats at Baseball Reference

Teams
- Oakland Athletics (2023); Tampa Bay Rays (2025); Minnesota Twins (2026–present)

Garrett Patrick Acton (born June 15, 1998) is an American professional baseball pitcher for the Minnesota Twins of Major League Baseball (MLB). He has previously played in MLB for the Oakland Athletics and Tampa Bay Rays.

== Amateur career ==
Acton attended Lemont High School in Lemont, Illinois. He was drafted by the Chicago White Sox in the 35th round of the 2016 Major League Baseball draft, but did not sign. He attended the University of Illinois Urbana-Champaign and played college baseball for the Illinois Fighting Illini. He finished his career at Illinois with a school record 25 career saves.

== Professional career ==
=== Oakland Athletics ===
Acton signed with the Oakland Athletics as an undrafted free agent after the 2020 Major League Baseball draft, which was shortened because of COVID-19. He did not play in a game in 2020 due to the cancellation of the minor league season because of the COVID-19 pandemic.

He made his professional debut in 2021 with the Single-A Stockton Ports, before later being promoted to the High-A Lansing Lugnuts. In 34 total games, Acton pitched to a 3.69 ERA with 87 strikeouts and 2 saves in 53.2 innings of work.

Acton was assigned to the Double-A Midland RockHounds to begin the 2022 season, before later being promoted the Triple-A Las Vegas Aviators. In 51 combined appearances, Acton registered a cumulative 3–9 record and 5.01 ERA with 92 strikeouts and 9 saves in 70.0 innings pitched.

Acton began the 2023 season back with Triple-A Las Vegas, where he worked to a 5–1 record and 4.01 ERA with 30 strikeouts in 24.2 innings of work. On May 14, 2023, he was selected to the 40-man roster and promoted to the major leagues for the first time. In 6 games for Oakland, he struggled to a 12.71 ERA with 5 strikeouts in 5 2/3 innings pitched. He was optioned back to Triple-A Las Vegas on May 29. On July 19, Acton was released by the Athletics.

=== Tampa Bay Rays ===
On December 18, 2023, Acton signed a two–year minor league contract with the Tampa Bay Rays organization. He did not make an appearance for the organization during the 2024 season as he rehabilitated from Tommy John surgery.

Acton made 43 appearances (three starts) for the Triple-A Durham Bulls to begin the 2025 season, compiling a 5–1 record and 3.64 ERA with 67 strikeouts and three saves across 54 1/3 innings pitched. On September 13, 2025, the Rays selected Acton's contract, adding him to their active roster. He made one scoreless appearance for the team, walking two over one inning pitched. Acton was designated for assignment by the Rays on November 3.

=== Miami Marlins ===
On November 6, 2025, Acton was claimed off waivers by the Colorado Rockies. On January 22, 2026, Acton was designated for assignment by the Rockies. On February 3, Acton was claimed off waivers by the Miami Marlins. He was optioned to the Triple-A Jacksonville Jumbo Shrimp to begin the regular season. In two appearances for Jacksonville, Acton recorded one win and four strikeouts while allowing no runs across 2 1/3 innings pitched. He was designated for assignment by Miami on March 29.

=== Minnesota Twins ===
On April 2, 2026, Acton was traded to the Minnesota Twins in exchange for pitcher Logan Whitaker. On April 28, Acton was placed on the injured list due to a right shoulder strain. He was transferred to the 60-day injured list on May 19. Acton was activated on August 1, and was subsequently optioned to the Triple-A St. Paul Saints.

== Personal life ==
Acton is the son of Janette and James Gordon Acton. His father played football at Purdue University, Triton College and Eastern Illinois University. His father was also a golf professional and head professional at several golf courses in the Chicago area. Acton has a younger sister named Isabel.
