= Mike McCarthy (baseball) =

American baseball coach (born 1987)

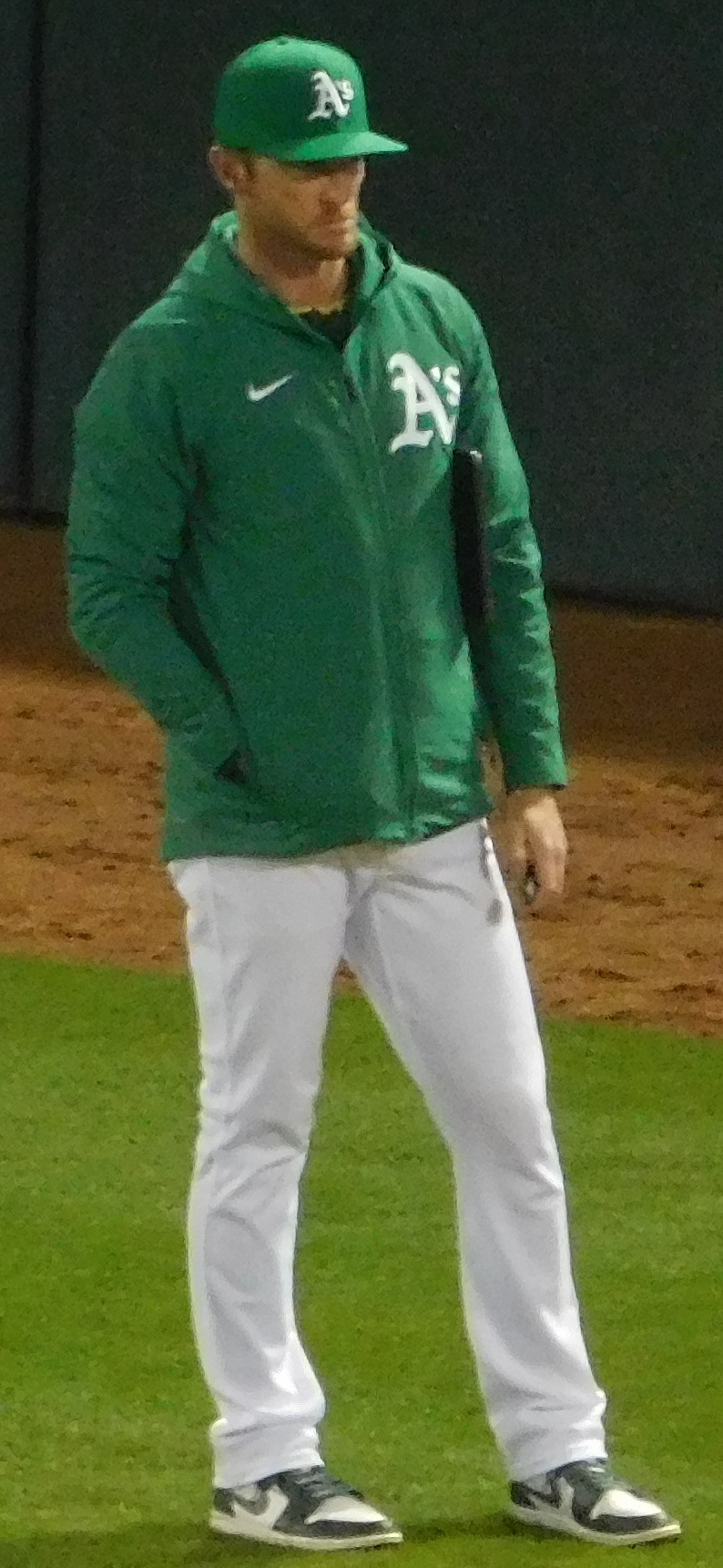
Mike McCarthy serving as Bullpen Coach for the Oakland A's.

Michael McCarthy (born November 18, 1987) is an American professional baseball coach in the minor leagues for the Seattle Mariners of Major League Baseball.

== Career ==
McCarthy was born in Walnut Creek, California, and raised in Brentwood. He graduated from Liberty High School and enrolled at the University of Redlands to play college baseball for the Redlands Bulldogs. He transferred to California State University, Bakersfield to continue his collegiate career with the Cal State Bakersfield Roadrunners in 2008. McCarthy helped the Roadrunners get ranked as high as 25th in the nation during just their 3rd year as a program. He was named an All-American Honorable Mention in 2011 and finished the season tied for most Regular Season innings in Division 1 baseball with Trevor Bauer.

The Boston Red Sox selected McCarthy in the 14th round of the 2011 MLB draft, and he reached Triple-A in 2014. During the 2014-15 season he played for the Perth Heat of the Australian Baseball League, winning the ABL Championship. He played professional baseball until 2016, all coming with the Boston Red Sox organization. In 2018, he became the bullpen coach for the Rochester Red Wings, the Triple-A affiliate of the Minnesota Twins. In 2020, he was named Pitching Coach for the Twins AAA affiliate. He served as Pitching Coach at the Twins 2020 Alternate Site in St Paul, Minnesota and served in the same role during the 2021 season. In 2022, he was the pitching coach for the El Paso Chihuahuas, the Triple-A affiliate of the San Diego Padres.

On November 28, 2022, the Athletics named McCarthy to their coaching staff as their bullpen coach for the 2023 season. He would serve as the Atlanta Braves AAA Pitching Coach in 2024.
