= Devin Sweet =

American baseball player (born 1996)

Free agent
- Pitcher
- Born: September 6, 1996 (age 30); Greensboro, North Carolina, U.S.
- Bats: Switch Throws: Right

MLB debut
- July 19, 2023, for the Seattle Mariners

MLB statistics (through 2023 season)
- Win–loss record: 1–0
- Earned run average: 10.38
- Strikeouts: 6
- Stats at Baseball Reference

Teams
- Seattle Mariners (2023); Oakland Athletics (2023)

Devin Sweet (born September 6, 1996) is an American professional baseball pitcher who is a free agent. He has previously played in Major League Baseball (MLB) for the Seattle Mariners and Oakland Athletics.

== Career ==
=== Amateur career ===
Sweet attended Southeast Guilford High School in Guilford County, North Carolina, and played for their baseball team. He attended North Carolina Central University and played college baseball for the North Carolina Central Eagles from 2014 to 2018.

=== Seattle Mariners ===
On July 13, 2018, Sweet signed with the Seattle Mariners as an undrafted free agent. He split his first professional season between the rookie–level Arizona League Mariners, Low–A Everett AquaSox, and Single–A Clinton LumberKings. In 15 total appearances, Sweet accumulated a 4.66 ERA with 24 strikeouts and 2 saves in 19 1/3 innings pitched. He spent 2019 with the Single–A West Virginia Power and High–A Modesto Nuts. Appearing in 34 total contests (15 starts), Sweet registered a cumulative 8–5 record and 2.76 ERA with 152 strikeouts in 127 1/3 innings of work. Sweet did not play in a game in 2020 due to the cancellation of the minor league season because of the COVID-19 pandemic.

He returned to action in 2021 with the Double–A Arkansas Travelers, where he made 25 appearances (13 starts) and logged a 5–6 record and 4.74 ERA with 93 strikeouts in 79 2/3 innings pitched. He spent 2022 back in Double–A with Arkansas, and registered a 4–6 record and 5.28 ERA with 68 strikeouts in 58.0 innings of work.

Sweet returned to Double–A Arkansas in 2023, and made 27 appearances, where he logged a 1.54 ERA with 47 strikeouts and 5 saves in 35.0 innings of work. On July 19, 2023, Sweet was selected to the 40-man roster and promoted to the major leagues for the first time. In two appearances for Seattle, he allowed two runs on two hits and one walk with one strikeout. On August 31, Sweet was designated for assignment following the waiver claim of Dominic Leone.

=== Oakland Athletics ===
On September 2, 2023, Sweet was claimed off waivers by the Oakland Athletics. In five appearances for Oakland, Sweet pitched to a 10.80 ERA with five strikeouts across 6 2/3 innings of work.

=== Detroit Tigers ===
On December 18, 2023, Sweet was claimed off waivers by the San Francisco Giants. On January 18, 2024, Sweet was claimed off waivers again, this time by the Detroit Tigers, who later designated him for assignment on January 29. He cleared waivers and was outrighted to the Triple–A Toledo Mud Hens on February 5. In 52 appearances for Toledo, Sweet compiled a 9–6 record and 3.91 ERA with 111 strikeouts and 4 saves over 76 innings pitched.

=== Philadelphia Phillies ===
On November 4, 2024, Sweet was traded to the Philadelphia Phillies in exchange for cash considerations and was added to their 40-man roster. He was optioned to the Triple-A Lehigh Valley IronPigs to begin the 2025 season. Sweet was designated for assignment by the Phillies on July 31, 2025. He cleared waivers and was sent outright to Triple-A Lehigh on August 3. On October 10, Sweet elected free agency.

=== Boston Red Sox ===
On December 18, 2025, Sweet signed a minor league contract with the Boston Red Sox. In 43 games (8 starts) with Triple-A Worcester Red Sox he threw 62.1 innings going 2-4 with a 4.91 ERA and 50 strikeouts. He elected free agency on November 2.
