= Ryan Noda =

American baseball player (born 1996)

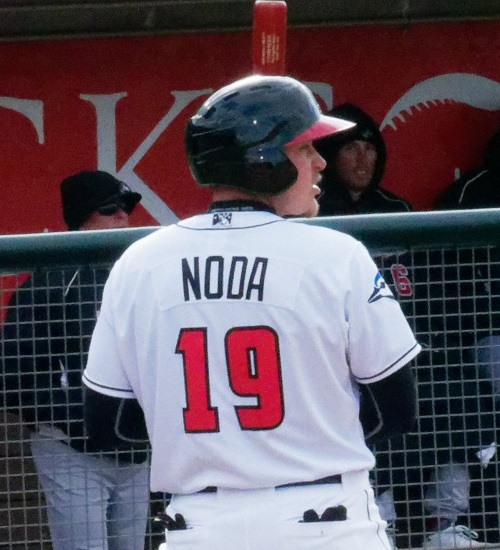
- Noda with the Lansing Lugnuts in 2018

Free agent
- First baseman
- Born: March 30, 1996 (age 30); Volo, Illinois, U.S.
- Bats: Left Throws: Left

MLB debut
- March 30, 2023, for the Oakland Athletics

MLB statistics (through 2025 season)
- Batting average: .203
- Home runs: 18
- Runs batted in: 60
- Stats at Baseball Reference

Teams
- Oakland Athletics (2023–2024); Chicago White Sox (2025); Baltimore Orioles (2025)

Ryan Anthony Noda (born March 30, 1996) is an American professional baseball first baseman who is a free agent. He has previously played in Major League Baseball (MLB) for the Oakland Athletics and Chicago White Sox.

== Amateur career ==
Noda attended Grant Community High School in Fox Lake, Illinois. He was not drafted after graduating, and then attended the University of Cincinnati, playing three seasons with the Bearcats. In his freshman season, Noda recorded a .230 batting average, seven home runs, and 32 runs batted in (RBI). In addition, he made a one-inning pitching appearance and did not allow a baserunner. After his freshman season in 2015, he played collegiate summer baseball for the Yarmouth–Dennis Red Sox of the Cape Cod Baseball League (CCBL), and helped lead the Red Sox to the league championship. As a sophomore, he batted .250 with six home runs and 34 RBI. Following his sophomore season in 2016, he returned to the CCBL, playing for the Brewster Whitecaps. In his final season with Cincinnati, Noda hit .236 with nine home runs and 36 RBI.

== Professional career ==
=== Toronto Blue Jays ===
The Toronto Blue Jays selected Noda in the 15th round of the 2017 Major League Baseball draft, and assigned him to the Rookie Advanced Bluefield Blue Jays of the Appalachian League. In 66 games, Noda recorded a .364 batting average, seven home runs, and 39 RBI. He spent the 2018 season with the Single-A Lansing Lugnuts, posting a .256/.421/.484 slash with 20 home runs, 80 RBI, and 14 stolen bases across 124 games.

In 2019, Noda made 117 appearances for the High-A Dunedin Blue Jays, hitting .238/.372/.418 with 13 home runs, 74 RBI, and 14 stolen bases. He did not play in a game in 2020 due to the cancellation of the minor league season because of the COVID-19 pandemic.

=== Los Angeles Dodgers ===
Noda was traded to the Los Angeles Dodgers on February 23, 2021, as the player to be named later in the deal that sent Ross Stripling to the Blue Jays in 2020. He was assigned to the Tulsa Drillers of the Double-A Central and played in 113 games for them, hitting .250 with 29 home runs and 78 RBI. He was selected as a post-season Double-A Central all-star. Noda was promoted to the Triple-A Oklahoma City Dodgers to begin the 2022 season, where he played in 135 games with a .259 average, 25 home runs and 90 RBI.

=== Oakland Athletics ===
On December 7, 2022, the Oakland Athletics selected Noda with the second pick of the Rule 5 draft. On March 27, 2023, the Athletics announced that Noda made their Opening Day roster. Noda appeared in 128 games with the A's in 2023 and was the team's primary first baseman despite breaking his jaw while fielding in mid-July. Noda was leading the American League with 60 walks at the time of the injury. Overall, he hit 16 home runs, drove in 54 runs, and walked 77 times. He was among the team's top hitters, finishing first in runs, walks, and on-base percentage (OBP), second in on-base plus slugging (OPS), and third in plate appearances, home runs, RBI, total hits, and batting average. He was also third among all rookies in total walks.

Noda played in 36 games for Oakland in 2024, slashing .137/.255/.211 with one home run and four RBI.

=== Los Angeles Angels ===
On November 1, 2024, Noda was claimed off waivers by the Los Angeles Angels. He was optioned to the Triple-A Salt Lake Bees to begin the 2025 season. In 38 appearances for Salt Lake, Noda batted .148/.364/.270 with four home runs, eight RBI, and two stolen bases. He was designated for assignment by the Angels on May 18, 2025.

=== Boston Red Sox ===
On May 22, 2025, Noda was traded to the Boston Red Sox in exchange for cash considerations. In 13 games for the Triple-A Worcester Red Sox, he batted .378/.519/.703 with three home runs, 13 RBI, and two stolen bases. Noda was designated for assignment by Boston on June 9.

=== Chicago White Sox ===
On June 13, 2025, Noda was claimed off waivers by the Chicago White Sox. In 16 appearances for Chicago, Noda went 3-for-34 (.088) with one home run and one RBI.

=== Baltimore Orioles ===
On August 2, 2025, Noda was claimed off waivers by the Baltimore Orioles. He was recalled from the Triple-A Norfolk Tides on August 3. In seven appearances for the Orioles, Noda went 2-for-13 (.154) with one RBI and one stolen base. Noda was designated for assignment following the acquisitions of Will Robertson and Drew Romo on December 6. He cleared waivers and was sent outright to Norfolk on December 12.

In 2026, he played in 97 games with Triple-A Norfolk Tides he batted .222/.364/.387 with 11 home runs, 27 RBIs and 7 stolen bases. He elected free agency on November 2.

== See also ==
- Rule 5 draft results
