= Eric Martins =

American baseball player & coach (born 1972)

- Coach
- Born: November 19, 1972 (age 53); East Los Angeles, California, U.S.
- Bats: Right Throws: Right
- Stats at Baseball Reference

Teams
- As coach: Oakland Athletics / Athletics (2020–2025)

Anthony Eric Martins (born November 19, 1972) is an American professional baseball coach who most recently served as the third base coach for the Athletics of Major League Baseball (MLB).

== Career ==
Martins attended La Serna High School in Whittier, California. After, he attended Cerritos College and Long Beach State. Martins was drafted by the Oakland Athletics in the 17th round of the 1994 MLB draft.

Martins played in the Athletics organization as an infielder from 1994 through the 2000 season, reaching the Triple-A level. He spent the 2001 through 2003 seasons in independent baseball. In 2004, he played his final season with the Nettuno Baseball Club in the Italian Baseball League.

Martins rejoined the Athletics organization in 2007 as a scout and remained in that role through 2014. In 2015, Martins transitioned to coaching and served as the hitting coach for the Midland RockHounds in 2015, Nashville Sounds from 2016 through 2018, and Las Vegas Aviators in 2019.

On October 31, 2019, Martins was promoted to assistant hitting coach of the Athletics. On November 28, 2022, he was named Oakland's third base coach for the 2023 season. On November 5, 2025, Ryan Christenson was hired as the team's first base coach, shifting Bobby Crosby to the role of third base coach; the moves subsequently bumped Martins from his role.

On February 6, 2026, Martins was announced as a player development instructor within the organization.
