= 2021 Oakland Athletics season =

2021 Oakland Athletics
- League: American League
- Division: West
- Ballpark: Oakland Coliseum
- City: Oakland, California
- Record: 86–76 (.531)
- Divisional place: 3rd
- Owners: John Fisher
- General managers: David Forst
- Managers: Bob Melvin
- Television: NBC Sports California (Glen Kuiper, Ray Fosse, Dallas Braden)
- Radio: KNEW; Oakland Athletics Radio Network (Ken Korach, Vince Cotroneo, Ray Fosse)

The 2021 Oakland Athletics season was the 121st season for the Oakland Athletics franchise, all as members of the American League. It was also their 54th season in Oakland, which equaled the amount of seasons that they played in their original city of Philadelphia. It would ultimately be their final season with a winning record as an Oakland based franchise. The team would move to Sacramento in 2025 in anticipation for their move to Las Vegas in 2028.

== Regular season ==
=== Standings ===
==== American League West ====
AL West
Team	W	L	Pct.	GB	Home	Road
Houston Astros	95	67	.586	—	51‍–‍30	44‍–‍37
Seattle Mariners	90	72	.556	5	46‍–‍35	44‍–‍37
Oakland Athletics	86	76	.531	9	43‍–‍38	43‍–‍38
Los Angeles Angels	77	85	.475	18	40‍–‍42	37‍–‍43
Texas Rangers	60	102	.370	35	36‍–‍45	24‍–‍57

==== American League Wild Card ====
Division leaders
Team	W	L	Pct.
Tampa Bay Rays	100	62	.617
Houston Astros	95	67	.586
Chicago White Sox	93	69	.574

Wild Card teams (Top 2 teams qualify for postseason)
Team	W	L	Pct.	GB
Boston Red Sox	92	70	.568	—
New York Yankees	92	70	.568	—
Toronto Blue Jays	91	71	.562	1
Seattle Mariners	90	72	.556	2
Oakland Athletics	86	76	.531	6
Cleveland Indians	80	82	.494	12
Los Angeles Angels	77	85	.475	15
Detroit Tigers	77	85	.475	15
Kansas City Royals	74	88	.457	18
Minnesota Twins	73	89	.451	19
Texas Rangers	60	102	.370	32
Baltimore Orioles	52	110	.321	40

=== Record against opponents ===
2021 American League record Source: MLB Standings Grid – 2021
Team	BAL	BOS	CWS	CLE	DET	HOU	KC	LAA	MIN	NYY	OAK	SEA	TB	TEX	TOR	NL
Baltimore	—	6–13	0–7	2–5	2–5	3–3	4–3	2–4	2–4	8–11	3–3	3–4	1–18	4–3	5–14	7–13
Boston	13–6	—	3–4	4–2	3–3	2–5	5–2	3–3	5–2	10–9	3–3	4–3	8–11	3–4	10–9	16–4
Chicago	7–0	4–3	—	10–9	12–7	2–5	9–10	2–5	13–6	1–5	4–3	3–3	3–3	5–1	4–3	14–6
Cleveland	5–2	2–4	9–10	—	12–7	1–6	14–5	5–1	8–11	3–4	2–4	3–4	1–6	4–2	2–5	9–11
Detroit	5–2	3–3	7–12	7–12	—	5–2	8–11	1–6	8–11	3–3	1–6	5–1	4–3	6–1	3–3	11–9
Houston	3–3	5–2	5–2	6–1	2–5	—	3–4	13–6	3–4	2–4	11–8	11–8	4–2	14–5	4–2	9–11
Kansas City	3–4	2–5	10–9	5–14	11–8	4–3	—	2–4	10–9	2–4	2–5	4–3	2–4	2–4	3–4	12–8
Los Angeles	4–2	3–3	5–2	1–5	6–1	6–13	4–2	—	5–2	4–3	4–15	8–11	1–6	11–8	4–3	11–9
Minnesota	4–2	2–5	6–13	11–8	11–8	4–3	9–10	2–5	—	1–6	1–5	2–4	3–3	4–3	3–4	10–10
New York	11–8	9–10	5–1	4–3	3–3	4–2	4–2	3–4	6–1	—	4–3	5–2	8–11	6–1	8–11	12–8
Oakland	3–3	3–3	3–4	4–2	6–1	8–11	5–2	15–4	5–1	3–4	—	4–15	4–3	10–9	2–5	11–9
Seattle	4–3	3–4	3–3	4–3	1–5	8–11	3–4	11–8	4–2	2–5	15–4	—	6–1	13–6	4–2	9–11
Tampa Bay	18–1	11–8	3–3	6–1	3–4	2–4	4–2	6–1	3–3	11–8	3–4	1–6	—	3–4	11–8	15–5
Texas	3–4	4–3	1–5	2–4	1–6	5–14	4–2	8–11	3–4	1–6	9–10	6–13	4–3	—	2–4	7–13
Toronto	14–5	9–10	3–4	5–2	3–3	2–4	4–3	3–4	4–3	11–8	5–2	2–4	8–11	4–2	—	14–6

Updated with the results of all games through October 3, 2021.

=== Game log ===
2021 Game Log
Total: 86–76 (Home: 43–38; Away: 43–38)
April: 16–11 (Home: 8–7; Away: 8–4)

#	Date	Opponent	Score	Win	Loss	Save	Attendance	Record	Streak
1	April 1	Astros	1–8	Greinke (1–0)	**Bassitt** (0–1)	—	10,436	0–1	L1
2	April 2	Astros	5–9	Abreu (1–0)	**Luzardo** (0–1)	—	5,446	0–2	L2
3	April 3	Astros	1–9	McCullers Jr. (1–0)	**Irvin** (0–1)	Raley (1)	5,803	0–3	L3
4	April 4	Astros	2–9	Bielak (1–0)	**Manaea** (0–1)	—	4,504	0–4	L4
5	April 5	Dodgers	3–10	May (1–0)	**Montas** (0–1)	—	6,653	0–5	L5
6	April 6	Dodgers	1–5	Kershaw (1–1)	**Bassitt** (0–2)	–	7,672	0–6	L6
7	April 7	Dodgers	4–3 (10)	**Petit** (1–0)	Nelson (0–1)	—	8,131	1–6	W1
8	April 8	@ Astros	2–6	Javier (1–0)	**Irvin** (0–2)	—	21,765	1–7	L1
9	April 9	@ Astros	6–2	**Petit** (2–0)	Abreu (1–1)	—	21,768	2–7	W1
10	April 10	@ Astros	7–3	**Montas** (1–1)	Urquidy (0–1)	—	21,760	3–7	W2
11	April 12	@ Diamondbacks	9–5	**Bassitt** (1–2)	Bumgarner (0–2)	—	8,768	4–7	W3
12	April 13	@ Diamondbacks	7–5	**Petit** (3–0)	Swarzak (0–1)	**Trivino** (1)	7,010	5–7	W4
13	April 15	Tigers	8–4	**Manaea** (1–1)	Skubal (0–2)	—	3,004	6–7	W5
14	April 16	Tigers	3–0	**Montas** (2–1)	Ureña (0–3)	**Trivino** (2)	4,538	7–7	W6
15	April 17	Tigers	7–0	**Irvin** (1–2)	Mize (1–1)	—	6,931	8–7	W7
16	April 18	Tigers	3–2	**Trivino** (1–0)	Soto (1–1)	—	6,917	9–7	W8
—	April 19	Twins	Postponed (COVID-19; Makeup: April 20)						
17	April 20 (1)	Twins	7–0 (7)	**Manaea** (2–1)	Shoemaker (1–1)	—	3,322	10–7	W9
18	April 20 (2)	Twins	1–0 (7)	**Luzardo** (1–1)	Berríos (2–2)	**Diekman** (1)	3,322	11–7	W10
19	April 21	Twins	13–12 (10)	**Guerra** (1–0)	Colomé (1–2)	—	3,405	12–7	W11
20	April 23	@ Orioles	3–1	**Irvin** (2-2)	Lopez (1-3)	**Diekman** (2)	7,574	13–7	W12
21	April 24	@ Orioles	7–2	**Bassitt** (2–2)	LeBlanc (0–1)	—	7,616	14–7	W13
22	April 25	@ Orioles	1–8	Means (2–0)	**Luzardo** (1–2)	—	8,107	14–8	L1
23	April 26	@ Rays	2–1	**Manaea** (3–1)	Hill (1–1)	**Trivino** (3)	2,981	15–8	W1
24	April 27	@ Rays	3–4	Springs (1–0)	**Montas** (2–2)	Castillo (5)	2,924	15–9	L1
25	April 28	@ Rays	0–2	Glasnow (3–1)	**Irvin** (2–3)	Castillo (6)	3,374	15–10	L2
26	April 29	@ Rays	3–2	**Diekman** (1–0)	Castillo (0–2)	**Trivino** (4)	3,737	16–10	W1
27	April 30	Orioles	2–3	Means (3–0)	**Fiers** (0–1)	Valdez (6)	5,777	16–11	L1

May: 15–14 (Home: 9–10; Away: 6–4)

#	Date	Opponent	Score	Win	Loss	Save	Attendance	Record	Streak
28	May 1	Orioles	4–8	Harvey (3–1)	**Luzardo** (1–3)	—	6,469	16–12	L2
29	May 2	Orioles	7–5	**Petit** (4–0)	Lakins (1–2)	**Trivino** (5)	5,862	17–12	W1
30	May 3	Blue Jays	5–4	**Montas** (3–2)	Matz (4–2)	**Diekman** (3)	2,944	18–12	W2
31	May 4	Blue Jays	4–1	**Irvin** (3–3)	Kay (0–2)	**Petit** (1)	2,970	19–12	W3
32	May 5	Blue Jays	4–9	Romano (3–1)	**Trivino** (1–1)	—	2,893	19–13	L1
33	May 6	Blue Jays	4–10	Ryu (2–2)	**Fiers** (0–2)	—	3,611	19–14	L2
34	May 7	Rays	2–1	**Diekman** (2–0)	Springs (2–1)	—	5,058	20–14	W1
35	May 8	Rays	6–3	**Montas** (4–2)	Glasnow (4–2)	**Trivino** (6)	7,707	21–14	W2
36	May 9	Rays	3–4	Springs (3–1)	**Irvin** (3–4)	Kittredge (2)	6,911	21–15	L1
37	May 11	@ Red Sox	3–2	**Bassitt** (3–2)	Hernández (0–2)	**Diekman** (4)	9,264	22–15	W1
38	May 12	@ Red Sox	4–1	**Kaprielian** (1–0)	Rodríguez (5–1)	**Diekman** (5)	9,272	23–15	W2
39	May 13	@ Red Sox	1–8	Richards (3–2)	**Manaea** (3–2)	Whitlock (1)	9,301	23–16	L1
40	May 14	@ Twins	6–1	**Montas** (5–2)	Shoemaker (2–4)	—	9,778	24–16	W1
41	May 15	@ Twins	4–5	Colomé (2–3)	**Diekman** (2–1)	Robles (1)	12,212	24–17	L1
42	May 16	@ Twins	7–6	**Trivino** (2–1)	Rogers (0–2)	—	10,270	25–17	W1
43	May 18	Astros	6–5	**Petit** (5–0)	Abreu (2–2)	—	4,838	26–17	W2
44	May 19	Astros	1–8	Greinke (4–1)	**Montas** (5–3)	—	3,925	26–18	L1
45	May 20	Astros	4–8	García (2–3)	**Irvin** (3–5)	—	4,562	26–19	L2
46	May 21	@ Angels	8–4	**Petit** (6–0)	Mayers (1–3)	—	14,624	27–19	W1
47	May 22	@ Angels	6–2	**Bassitt** (4–2)	Sandoval (0–1)	—	15,151	28–19	W2
48	May 23	@ Angels	5–6	Iglesias (3–2)	**Guerra** (1–1)	—	15,154	28–20	L1
49	May 24	Mariners	2–4	Kikuchi (2–3)	**Montas** (5–4)	Middleton (3)	3,019	28–21	L2
50	May 25	Mariners	3–4	Sewald (2–0)	**Irvin** (3–6)	Montero (6)	2,865	28–22	L3
51	May 26	Mariners	6–3	**Kaprielian** (2–0)	Dugger (0–1)	**Diekman** (6)	3,571	29–22	W1
52	May 27	Angels	5–0	**Bassitt** (5–2)	Slegers (2–2)	—	5,487	30–22	W2
53	May 28	Angels	3–1	**Petit** (7–0)	Ohtani (1–1)	**Trivino** (7)	8,757	31–22	W3
54	May 29	Angels	0–4	Cobb (3–2)	**Montas** (5–5)	—	9,433	31–23	L1
55	May 30	Angels	2–4	Suárez (2–0)	**Irvin** (3–7)	Iglesias (9)	10,029	31–24	L2
56	May 31	@ Mariners	5–6 (10)	Zamora (2–0)	**Trivino** (2–2)	—	11,112	31–25	L3

June: 17–9 (Home: 9–2; Away: 8–7)

#	Date	Opponent	Score	Win	Loss	Save	Attendance	Record	Streak
57	June 1	@ Mariners	12–6	**Luzardo** (2–3)	Sewald (2–1)	—	9,160	32–25	W1
58	June 2	@ Mariners	6–0	**Manaea** (4–2)	Flexen (5–3)	—	9,588	33–25	W2
59	June 4	@ Rockies	9–5	**Montas** (6–5)	Gray (4–6)	—	26,790	34–25	W3
60	June 5	@ Rockies	6–3	**Irvin** (4–7)	Freeland (0–1)	**Trivino** (8)	27,459	35–25	W4
61	June 6	@ Rockies	1–3	Márquez (4–5)	**Kaprielian** (2–1)	Bard (7)	23,716	35–26	L1
62	June 8	Diamondbacks	5–2	**Bassitt** (6–2)	Duplantier (0–2)	**Trivino** (9)	3,695	36–26	W1
63	June 9	Diamondbacks	4–0	**Manaea** (5–2)	Peacock (2–3)	—	4,090	37–26	W2
64	June 10	Royals	1–6	Minor (5–3)	**Montas** (6–6)	—	3,211	37–27	L1
65	June 11	Royals	4–3	**Trivino** (3–2)	Barlow (2–2)	—	6,964	38–27	W1
66	June 12	Royals	11–2	**Kaprielian** (3–1)	Kowar (0–2)	—	7,678	39–27	W2
67	June 13	Royals	6–3	**Bassitt** (7–2)	Bubic (1–2)	**Trivino** (10)	7,060	40–27	W3
68	June 14	Angels	8–5	**Manaea** (6–2)	Bundy (1–7)	**Trivino** (11)	4,102	41–27	W4
69	June 15	Angels	6–4	**Montas** (7–6)	Heaney (4–4)	**Petit** (2)	4,942	42–27	W5
70	June 16	Angels	8–4	**Smith** (1–0)	Watson (2–3)	—	6,228	43–27	W6
71	June 18	@ Yankees	5–3	**Kaprielian** (4–1)	Peralta (3–2)	**Trivino** (12)	24,037	44–27	W7
72	June 19	@ Yankees	5–7	Green (2–4)	**Luzardo** (2–4)	Chapman (15)	23,985	44–28	L1
73	June 20	@ Yankees	1–2	Loáisiga (7–2)	**Manaea** (6–3)	Chapman (16)	27,807	44–29	L2
74	June 21	@ Rangers	3–8	Gibson (5–0)	**Montas** (7–7)	—	20,259	44–30	L3
75	June 22	@ Rangers	13–6	**Irvin** (5–7)	Hearn (2–2)	—	19,185	45–30	W1
76	June 23	@ Rangers	3–5	Martin (2–2)	**Petit** (7–1)	Rodríguez (1)	21,829	45–31	L1
77	June 24	@ Rangers	5–1	**Bassitt** (8–2)	Allard (2–3)	—	20,432	46–31	W1
78	June 25	@ Giants	0–2	Cueto (6–3)	**Manaea** (6–4)	McGee (15)	36,928	46–32	L1
79	June 26	@ Giants	5–6 (10)	McGee (3–2)	**Smith** (1–1)	—	33,168	46–33	L2
80	June 27	@ Giants	6–2	**Irvin** (6–7)	Long (1–1)	—	35,920	47–33	W1
81	June 29	Rangers	4–5	Foltynewicz (2–7)	**Kaprielian** (4–2)	Kennedy (14)	4,739	47–34	L1
82	June 30	Rangers	3–1	**Bassitt** (9–2)	Allard (2–4)	**Trivino** (13)	4,320	48–34	W1

July: 11–13 (Home: 4–5; Away: 7–8)

#	Date	Opponent	Score	Win	Loss	Save	Attendance	Record	Streak
83	July 1	Rangers	3–8	King (6–5)	**Manaea** (6–5)	—	5,182	48–35	L1
84	July 2	Red Sox	2–3 (10)	Barnes (4–2)	**Trivino** (3–3)	Ottavino (6)	32,304	48–36	L2
85	July 3	Red Sox	7–6 (12)	**Wendelken** (1–0)	Andriese (2–3)	—	16,297	49–36	W1
86	July 4	Red Sox	0–1	Pivetta (7–3)	**Kaprielian** (4–3)	Barnes (19)	13,070	49–37	L1
87	July 6	@ Astros	6–9	Abreu (3–3)	**Wendelken** (1–1)	Pressly (15)	26,353	49–38	L2
88	July 7	@ Astros	3–4	Taylor (2–2)	**Manaea** (6–6)	Pressly (16)	21,150	49–39	L3
89	July 8	@ Astros	2–1	**Montas** (8–7)	McCullers Jr. (6–2)	**Diekman** (7)	29,243	50–39	W1
90	July 9	@ Rangers	2–3	Lyles (5–5)	**Irvin** (6–8)	Kennedy (15)	29,619	50–40	L1
91	July 10	@ Rangers	8–4 (11)	**Wendelken** (2–1)	Patton (0–1)	—	30,030	51–40	W1
92	July 11	@ Rangers	4–1	**Bassitt** (10–2)	Allard (2–6)	**Trivino** (14)	30,531	52–40	W2
-	July 13	**91st All-Star Game in Denver, CO**							
93	July 16	Indians	5–4	**Romo** (1–0)	Clase (3–5)	—	12,361	53–40	W3
94	July 17	Indians	2–3	Quantrill (2–2)	**Montas** (8–8)	Karinchak (10)	11,374	53–41	L1
95	July 18	Indians	2–4	Plesac (5–3)	**Bassitt** (10–3)	Shaw (2)	8,572	53–42	L2
96	July 19	Angels	4–1	**Irvin** (7–8)	Cishek (0–1)	**Trivino** (15)	14,856	54–42	W1
97	July 20	Angels	6–0	**Kaprielian** (5–3)	Suárez (4–3)	—	9,154	55–42	W2
98	July 22	@ Mariners	4–1	**Manaea** (7–6)	Flexen (9–4)	**Trivino** (16)	18,553	56–42	W3
99	July 23	@ Mariners	3–4	Sewald (6–2)	**Diekman** (2–2)	Graveman (10)	21,312	56–43	L1
100	July 24	@ Mariners	4–5	Graveman (3–0)	**Trivino** (3–4)	—	30,843	56–44	L2
101	July 25	@ Mariners	3–4	Gonzales (3–5)	**Irvin** (7–9)	Steckenrider (3)	21,501	56–45	L3
102	July 27	@ Padres	4–7	Paddack (7–6)	**Kaprielian** (5–4)	Melancon (31)	40,162	56–46	L4
103	July 28	@ Padres	10–4	**Manaea** (8–6)	Snell (4–4)	—	35,351	57–46	W1
104	July 29	@ Angels	4–0	**Montas** (9–8)	Bundy (1–8)	—	18,631	58–46	W2
105	July 30	@ Angels	2–0	**Bassitt** (11–3)	Sandoval (3–5)	**Trivino** (17)	28,861	59–46	W3
106	July 31	@ Angels	0–1	Barría (2–0)	**Irvin** (7–10)	Iglesias (22)	23,207	59–47	L1

August: 14–12 (Home: 7–7; Away: 7–5)

#	Date	Opponent	Score	Win	Loss	Save	Attendance	Record	Streak
107	August 1	@ Angels	8–3	**Jefferies** (1–0)	Detmers (0–1)	—	21,597	60–47	W1
108	August 3	Padres	1–8	Snell (5–4)	**Manaea** (8–7)	—	11,985	60–48	L1
109	August 4	Padres	5–4 (10)	**Trivino** (4–4)	Hill (5–6)	—	10,648	61–48	W1
110	August 6	Rangers	4–1 (11)	**Petit** (8–1)	Herget (0–1)	—	9,022	62–48	W2
111	August 7	Rangers	12–3	**Irvin** (8–10)	Anderson (0–1)	—	10,082	63–48	W3
112	August 8	Rangers	6–3	**Kaprielian** (6–4)	Lyles (5–9)	**Trivino** (18)	9,548	64–48	W4
113	August 10	@ Indians	4–3 (10)	**Trivino** (5–4)	Wittgren (2–5)	**Chafin** (1)	13,041	65–48	W5
114	August 11	@ Indians	6–3	**Diekman** (3–2)	Sandlin (1–1)	**Trivino** (19)	13,560	66–48	W6
115	August 12	@ Indians	17–0	**Bassitt** (12–3)	Morgan (1–5)	—	16,559	67–48	W7
116	August 13	@ Rangers	6–8	Santana (2–2)	**Irvin** (8–11)	Barlow (1)	26,761	67–49	L1
117	August 14	@ Rangers	8–3	**Chafin** (1–2)	Lyles (5–10)	—	31,904	68–49	W1
118	August 15	@ Rangers	4–7	Allard (3–10)	**Manaea** (8–8)	Barlow (2)	24,990	68–50	L1
119	August 16	@ White Sox	2–5	Keuchel (8–6)	**Montas** (9–9)	Hendriks (27)	19,410	68–51	L2
120	August 17	@ White Sox	0–9	López (2–0)	**Bassitt** (12–4)	—	21,025	68–52	L3
121	August 18	@ White Sox	2–3	Crochet (3–5)	**Blackburn** (0–1)	Hendriks (28)	22,780	68–53	L4
122	August 19	@ White Sox	5–4	**Irvin** (9–11)	Kopech (3–2)	**Trivino** (20)	23,853	69–53	W1
123	August 20	Giants	4–1	**Kaprielian** (7–4)	Wood (10–4)	**Trivino** (21)	40,133	70–53	W2
124	August 21	Giants	5–6	Rogers (4–1)	**Trivino** (5–5)	McGee (27)	36,230	70–54	L1
125	August 22	Giants	1–2	Leone (3–2)	**Puk** (0–1)	McGee (28)	30,345	70–55	L2
126	August 23	Mariners	3–5	Misiewicz (4–4)	**Trivino** (5–6)	Sewald (7)	4,140	70–56	L3
127	August 24	Mariners	1–5	Flexen (11–5)	**Irvin** (9–12)	Steckenrider (6)	4,508	70–57	L4
128	August 26	Yankees	6–7	Loáisiga (9–4)	**Trivino** (5–7)	Chapman (24)	8,147	70–58	L5
129	August 27	Yankees	2–8	Cole (13–6)	**Manaea** (8–9)	—	22,463	70–59	L6
130	August 28	Yankees	3–2	**Montas** (10–9)	Cortés Jr. (2–2)	**Romo** (1)	18,337	71–59	W1
131	August 29	Yankees	3–1	**Guerra** (2–1)	Green (7–6)	**Chafin** (2)	18,468	72–59	W2
132	August 31	@ Tigers	9–3	**Guerra** (3–1)	Skubal (8–12)	—	13,853	73–59	W3

September: 12–15 (Home: 6–7; Away: 6–8)

#	Date	Opponent	Score	Win	Loss	Save	Attendance	Record	Streak
133	September 1	@ Tigers	6–8	Jiménez (5–1)	**Puk** (0–2)	Soto (17)	12,593	73–60	L1
134	September 2	@ Tigers	8–6	**Montas** (11–9)	Manning (3–6)	**Romo** (2)	11,623	74–60	W1
135	September 3	@ Blue Jays	10–11	Romano (7–1)	**Romo** (1–1)	—	14,843	74–61	L1
136	September 4	@ Blue Jays	8–10	Berríos (10–7)	**Blackburn** (0–2)	—	14,947	74–62	L2
137	September 5	@ Blue Jays	0–8	Ray (11–5)	**Irvin** (9–13)	—	14,988	74–63	L3
138	September 7	White Sox	3–6	Lambert (1–1)	**Puk** (0–3)	Hendriks (33)	4,556	74–64	L4
139	September 8	White Sox	5–1	**Montas** (12–9)	Keuchel (8–9)	—	8,147	75–64	W1
140	September 9	White Sox	3–1	**Manaea** (9–9)	López (3–2)	**Chafin** (3)	5,078	76–64	W2
141	September 10	Rangers	10–5	**Guerra** (4–1)	Otto (0–1)	—	7,157	77–64	W3
142	September 11	Rangers	6–8	Martin (4–4)	**Chafin** (1–3)	Barlow (5)	7,945	77–65	L1
143	September 12	Rangers	3–4	Hearn (6–4)	**Kaprielian** (7–5)	Barlow (6)	6,983	77–66	L2
144	September 14	@ Royals	7–10	Brentz (5–2)	**Petit** (8–2)	Barlow (13)	10,254	77–67	L3
145	September 15	@ Royals	12–10	**Manaea** (10–9)	Hernández (6–2)	**Chafin** (4)	11,056	78–67	W1
146	September 16	@ Royals	7–2	**Blackburn** (1–2)	Lynch (4–5)	—	11,729	79–67	W2
147	September 17	@ Angels	5–4	**Irvin** (10–13)	Marte (0–1)	**Romo** (3)	18,918	80–67	W3
148	September 18	@ Angels	3–1	**Kaprielian** (8–5)	Suárez (7–8)	**Chafin** (5)	27,150	81–67	W4
149	September 19	@ Angels	3–2 (10)	**Trivino** (6–7)	Iglesias (7–5)	—	22,456	82–67	W5
150	September 20	Mariners	2–4	Anderson (7–9)	**Manaea** (10–10)	Sewald (9)	4,068	82–68	L1
151	September 21	Mariners	2–5	Gonzales (9–5)	**Blackburn** (1–3)	Steckenrider (10)	4,246	82–69	L2
152	September 22	Mariners	1–4	Flexen (13–6)	**Irvin** (10–14)	Steckenrider (11)	4,149	82–70	L3
153	September 23	Mariners	5–6	Smith (3–4)	**Diekman** (3–3)	Sewald (10)	4,966	82–71	L4
154	September 24	Astros	14–2	**Montas** (13–9)	Bielak (3–4)	—	21,105	83–71	W1
155	September 25	Astros	2–1	**Chafin** (2–3)	Pressly (5–3)	—	13,037	84–71	W2
156	September 26	Astros	4–3	**Trivino** (7–7)	Stanek (3–5)	—	12,288	85–71	W3
157	September 27	@ Mariners	4–13	Flexen (14–6)	**Irvin** (10–15)	—	11,169	85–72	L1
158	September 28	@ Mariners	2–4	Misiewicz (5–5)	**Petit** (8–3)	Steckenrider (12)	12,635	85–73	L2
159	September 29	@ Mariners	2–4	Castillo (5–5)	**Chafin** (2–4)	Steckenrider (13)	17,366	85–74	L3

October: 1–2 (Home: 0–0; Away: 1–2)

#	Date	Opponent	Score	Win	Loss	Save	Attendance	Record	Streak
160	October 1	@ Astros	8–6	**Manaea** (11–10)	Valdez (11–6)	**Trivino** (22)	26,672	86–74	W1
161	October 2	@ Astros	4–10	Maton (6–0)	**Blackburn** (1–4)	—	29,208	86–75	L1
162	October 3	@ Astros	6–7	Taylor (4–4)	**Trivino** (7–8)	—	29,752	86–76	L2

Legend: = Win = Loss = Postponement
Bold = Athletics team member

== Roster ==
2021 Oakland Athletics
Roster
Pitchers: 68 Domingo Acevedo; 40 Chris Bassitt; 60 Cam Bedrosian; 58 Paul Blackburn; 39 Andrew Chafin; 35 Jake Diekman; 53 Michael Feliz; 50 Mike Fiers; 61 Reymin Guduan; 65 Deolis Guerra; 19 Cole Irvin; 66 Daulton Jefferies; 32 James Kaprielian; 21 Adam Kolarek; 44 Jesús Luzardo; 55 Sean Manaea; 60 Sam Moll; 47 Frankie Montas; 36 Yusmeiro Petit; 33 A. J. Puk; 54 Sergio Romo; 46 Burch Smith; 62 Lou Trivino; 70 Jordan Weems; 57 J. B. Wendelken	Catchers: 30 Austin Allen; 37 Aramis Garcia; 23 Yan Gomes; 12 Sean Murphy; Infielders: 17 Elvis Andrus; 26 Matt Chapman; 1 Josh Harrison; 5 Tony Kemp; 38 Pete Kozma; 8 Jed Lowrie; 31,39 Vimael Machín; 18 Mitch Moreland; 28 Matt Olson; 18 Chad Pinder; 45 Frank Schwindel; 11 Jacob Wilson	Outfielders: 13 Luis Barrera; 49 Skye Bolt; 15 Seth Brown; 20 Mark Canha; 11 Khris Davis; 22 Ramón Laureano; 2 Starling Marte; 4 Chad Pinder; 25 Stephen Piscotty; 1 Ka'ai Tom	Manager: 6 Bob Melvin; Coaches: 10 Mike Aldrete (first base); 51 Darren Bush (hitting); 29 Ryan Christenson (bench); 14 Scott Emerson (pitching); 91 Dustin Hughes (bullpen catcher); 59 Marcus Jensen (bullpen/catching); 7 Mark Kotsay (third base); 52 Eric Martins (assistant hitting); 88 Philip Pohl (bullpen catcher)

== Statistics ==
=== Batting ===
List does not include pitchers. Stats in bold are the team leaders.

Note: G = Games played; AB = At bats; R = Runs; H = Hits; 2B = Doubles; 3B = Triples; HR = Home runs; RBI = Runs batted in; BB = Walks; SO = Strikeouts; SB = Stolen bases; Avg. = Batting average; OBP = On-base percentage; SLG = Slugging percentage; OPS = On Base + Slugging

Player	G	AB	R	H	2B	3B	HR	RBI	BB	SO	SB	AVG	OBP	SLG	OPS
Matt Olson	**156**	**565**	**101**	**153**	**35**	0	**39**	**111**	**88**	113	4	**.271**	**.371**	**.540**	**.911**
Matt Chapman	151	529	75	111	15	3	27	72	80	**202**	3	.210	.314	.403	.716
Mark Canha	141	519	93	120	22	**4**	17	61	77	128	12	.231	.358	.387	.746
Elvis Andrus	146	497	60	121	25	2	3	37	31	81	12	.243	.294	.320	.614
Jed Lowrie	139	457	55	112	28	0	14	69	49	108	0	.245	.318	.398	.717
Sean Murphy	119	393	47	85	23	0	17	59	40	114	0	.216	.306	.405	.710
Ramón Laureano	88	341	43	84	21	2	14	39	27	98	12	.246	.317	.443	.760
Tony Kemp	131	330	54	92	16	3	8	37	52	51	8	.279	.382	.418	.800
Seth Brown	111	281	43	60	13	1	20	48	23	89	4	.214	.274	.480	.754
Starling Marte	56	234	37	74	16	2	5	30	11	42	**25**	.316	.359	.466	.824
Mitch Moreland	81	229	28	52	11	1	10	30	18	58	0	.227	.286	.415	.701
Chad Pinder	75	214	30	52	16	1	6	27	16	62	1	.243	.300	.411	.712
Josh Harrison	48	185	19	47	10	0	2	22	6	25	4	.254	.296	.341	.637
Stephen Piscotty	72	173	14	38	8	0	5	16	13	48	1	.220	.282	.353	.634
Yan Gomes	40	131	19	29	4	0	5	17	6	31	0	.221	.264	.366	.631
Aramis Garcia	32	88	8	18	1	0	3	7	1	28	0	.205	.239	.318	.557
Skye Bolt	32	56	5	5	1	0	1	4	1	14	2	.089	.105	.161	.266
Khris Davis	20	51	3	13	4	0	1	5	2	15	0	.255	.283	.392	.675
Vimael Machín	15	32	1	4	0	0	0	1	3	10	0	.125	.200	.125	.325
Frank Schwindel	8	20	2	3	1	0	1	3	0	5	0	.150	.150	.350	.500
Ka'ai Tom	9	16	1	1	0	0	0	1	0	6	0	.063	.063	.063	.125
Pete Kozma	3	11	0	1	0	0	0	0	1	4	0	.091	.167	.091	.258
Austin Allen	4	8	2	2	0	0	1	1	0	3	0	.250	.250	.625	.875
Luis Barrera	6	8	1	2	0	0	0	0	0	2	0	.250	.250	.250	.500
Jacob Wilson	6	7	1	1	0	0	0	0	0	1	0	.143	.143	.143	.286
Non-Pitcher Totals	162	5375	742	1280	270	19	199	697	545	1338	88	.238	.317	.407	.723
**Team totals**	**162**	**5395**	**743**	**1284**	**271**	**19**	**199**	**698**	**545**	**1349**	**88**	**.238**	**.317**	**.406**	**.723**

=== Pitching ===
List does not include position players. Stats in bold are the team leaders.

Note: W = Wins; L = Losses; ERA = Earned run average; G = Games pitched; GS = Games started; SV = Saves; IP = Innings pitched; R = Total runs allowed; ER = Earned runs allowed; BB = Walks allowed; K = Strikeouts

Player	W	L	ERA	G	GS	SV	IP	H	R	ER	BB	K
Frankie Montas	**13**	9	**3.37**	32	**32**	0	**187.0**	164	79	70	**57**	**207**
Sean Manaea	11	10	3.91	32	**32**	0	179.1	179	79	78	41	194
Cole Irvin	10	**15**	4.24	32	**32**	0	178.1	**195**	**94**	**84**	42	125
Chris Bassitt	12	4	3.15	27	27	0	157.1	127	55	55	39	159
James Kaprielian	8	5	4.07	24	21	0	119.1	105	55	54	41	123
Yusmeiro Petit	8	3	3.92	**78**	0	2	78.0	69	35	34	12	37
Lou Trivino	7	8	3.18	71	0	**22**	73.2	58	32	26	34	67
Deolis Guerra	4	1	4.11	53	0	0	65.2	53	34	30	20	62
Sergio Romo	1	1	4.67	66	0	3	61.2	56	33	32	21	60
Jake Diekman	3	3	3.86	67	0	7	60.2	47	29	26	34	83
Burch Smith	1	1	5.40	31	0	0	43.1	49	27	26	11	28
Paul Blackburn	1	4	5.87	9	9	0	38.1	52	26	25	10	26
Jesús Luzardo	2	4	6.87	13	6	0	38.0	46	32	29	16	40
Andrew Chafin	2	2	1.53	28	0	5	29.1	24	5	5	7	27
J.B. Wendelken	2	1	4.32	26	0	0	25.0	29	15	12	13	26
Daulton Jefferies	1	0	3.60	5	1	0	15.0	11	6	6	4	8
Reymin Guduan	0	0	6.28	11	0	0	14.1	19	11	10	5	5
A.J. Puk	0	3	6.08	12	0	0	13.1	18	9	9	6	16
Domingo Acevedo	0	0	3.27	10	0	0	11.0	9	4	4	4	9
Sam Moll	0	0	3.48	8	0	0	10.1	8	4	4	5	8
Mike Fiers	0	2	7.71	2	2	0	9.1	15	8	8	4	5
Cam Bedrosian	0	0	2.00	9	0	0	9.0	9	2	2	4	8
Adam Kolarek	0	0	8.00	12	0	0	9.0	15	10	8	5	4
Jordan Weems	0	0	6.23	5	0	0	4.1	2	3	3	3	4
Michael Feliz	0	0	0.00	1	0	0	0.1	1	0	0	1	0
**Team totals**	**86**	**76**	**4.02**	**162**	**162**	**39**	**1433.0**	**1362**	**687**	**640**	**439**	**1332**

== Farm system ==
Level	Team	League	Division	Manager	Record Type	Record
AAA	Las Vegas Aviators	Triple-A West	West	Fran Riordan	Regular; Final Stretch	62–58 (.517); 3–3 (.500)
AA	Midland RockHounds	Double-A Central	South	Bobby Crosby	Regular	59–60 (.496)
High-A	Lansing Lugnuts	High-A Central	East	Scott Steinmann	Regular	58–62 (.483)
Low-A	Stockton Ports	Low-A West	North	Rico Brogna	Regular	42–75 (.359)
Rookie	ACL Athletics	Arizona Complex League	East	Adam Rosales	Regular	16–43 (.271)
Rookie	DSL Athletics	Dominican Summer League	Northwest	Carlos Casimiro	Regular	20–36 (.357)
