= 2021 Seattle Mariners season =

2021 Seattle Mariners
- League: American League
- Division: West
- Ballpark: T-Mobile Park
- City: Seattle, Washington
- Record: 90–72 (.556)
- Divisional place: 2nd
- Owners: Baseball Club of Seattle, LP, represented by CEO John Stanton
- General manager: Jerry Dipoto
- Manager: Scott Servais
- Television: Root Sports Northwest (Dave Sims, Aaron Goldsmith, Mike Blowers)
- Radio: ESPN-710; Seattle Mariners Radio Network (Rick Rizzs, Aaron Goldsmith, Dave Sims)

The 2021 Seattle Mariners season was the 45th season in franchise history. The Mariners played their 22nd full season (23rd overall) at T-Mobile Park, their home ballpark in Seattle, Washington. The M's entered this season with the longest active playoff drought in the four major North American professional sports leagues, attempting to make their first postseason in twenty years. Seattle is the only current Major League Baseball (MLB) franchise without a World Series appearance. Despite posting a 90–72 record, their best since the 2003 season, the Mariners finished in second place in the American League West and were eliminated from postseason contention for the 20th consecutive season after the Boston Red Sox and New York Yankees clinched the Wild Card spots on the final day of the regular season. This season was the second time during their drought that the Mariners won two more regular season games than the World Series champions.

== Regular season ==
In the Mariners' 1–0 loss to the Los Angeles Dodgers on April 20, the two teams combined for three hits, tying the record for the fewest in an interleague game set by the Boston Red Sox and Montreal Expos in 1997. As that game featured a home run, a double, and a single, and the Mariners/Dodgers games featured just a double and two singles, it broke the record for fewest total bases in a regular-season interleague game.

Pitcher Yusei Kikuchi was the team's lone MLB All-Star Game selection.

On September 1, general manager Jerry Dipoto was promoted to president of baseball operations.

=== American League West ===
AL West
Team	W	L	Pct.	GB	Home	Road
Houston Astros	95	67	.586	—	51‍–‍30	44‍–‍37
Seattle Mariners	90	72	.556	5	46‍–‍35	44‍–‍37
Oakland Athletics	86	76	.531	9	43‍–‍38	43‍–‍38
Los Angeles Angels	77	85	.475	18	40‍–‍42	37‍–‍43
Texas Rangers	60	102	.370	35	36‍–‍45	24‍–‍57

=== American League playoff standings ===
Division leaders
Team	W	L	Pct.
Tampa Bay Rays	100	62	.617
Houston Astros	95	67	.586
Chicago White Sox	93	69	.574

Wild Card teams (Top 2 teams qualify for postseason)
Team	W	L	Pct.	GB
Boston Red Sox	92	70	.568	—
New York Yankees	92	70	.568	—
Toronto Blue Jays	91	71	.562	1
Seattle Mariners	90	72	.556	2
Oakland Athletics	86	76	.531	6
Cleveland Indians	80	82	.494	12
Los Angeles Angels	77	85	.475	15
Detroit Tigers	77	85	.475	15
Kansas City Royals	74	88	.457	18
Minnesota Twins	73	89	.451	19
Texas Rangers	60	102	.370	32
Baltimore Orioles	52	110	.321	40

=== Record against opponents ===
2021 American League record Source: MLB Standings Grid – 2021
Team	BAL	BOS	CWS	CLE	DET	HOU	KC	LAA	MIN	NYY	OAK	SEA	TB	TEX	TOR	NL
Baltimore	—	6–13	0–7	2–5	2–5	3–3	4–3	2–4	2–4	8–11	3–3	3–4	1–18	4–3	5–14	7–13
Boston	13–6	—	3–4	4–2	3–3	2–5	5–2	3–3	5–2	10–9	3–3	4–3	8–11	3–4	10–9	16–4
Chicago	7–0	4–3	—	10–9	12–7	2–5	9–10	2–5	13–6	1–5	4–3	3–3	3–3	5–1	4–3	14–6
Cleveland	5–2	2–4	9–10	—	12–7	1–6	14–5	5–1	8–11	3–4	2–4	3–4	1–6	4–2	2–5	9–11
Detroit	5–2	3–3	7–12	7–12	—	5–2	8–11	1–6	8–11	3–3	1–6	5–1	4–3	6–1	3–3	11–9
Houston	3–3	5–2	5–2	6–1	2–5	—	3–4	13–6	3–4	2–4	11–8	11–8	4–2	14–5	4–2	9–11
Kansas City	3–4	2–5	10–9	5–14	11–8	4–3	—	2–4	10–9	2–4	2–5	4–3	2–4	2–4	3–4	12–8
Los Angeles	4–2	3–3	5–2	1–5	6–1	6–13	4–2	—	5–2	4–3	4–15	8–11	1–6	11–8	4–3	11–9
Minnesota	4–2	2–5	6–13	11–8	11–8	4–3	9–10	2–5	—	1–6	1–5	2–4	3–3	4–3	3–4	10–10
New York	11–8	9–10	5–1	4–3	3–3	4–2	4–2	3–4	6–1	—	4–3	5–2	8–11	6–1	8–11	12–8
Oakland	3–3	3–3	3–4	4–2	6–1	8–11	5–2	15–4	5–1	3–4	—	4–15	4–3	10–9	2–5	11–9
Seattle	4–3	3–4	3–3	4–3	1–5	8–11	3–4	11–8	4–2	2–5	15–4	—	6–1	13–6	4–2	9–11
Tampa Bay	18–1	11–8	3–3	6–1	3–4	2–4	4–2	6–1	3–3	11–8	3–4	1–6	—	3–4	11–8	15–5
Texas	3–4	4–3	1–5	2–4	1–6	5–14	4–2	8–11	3–4	1–6	9–10	6–13	4–3	—	2–4	7–13
Toronto	14–5	9–10	3–4	5–2	3–3	2–4	4–3	3–4	4–3	11–8	5–2	2–4	8–11	4–2	—	14–6

Updated with the results of all games through October 3, 2021.

=== Game log ===
2021 game log: 90–72 (Home: 46–35; Away: 44–37)
April: 15–12 (Home: 7–5; Away: 8–7)

#	Date	Opponent	Score	Win	Loss	Save	Attendance	Record	Streak
1	April 1	Giants	8–7 (10)	**Misiewicz** (1–0)	Álvarez (0–1)	—	8,174	1–0	W1
2	April 2	Giants	3–6	Peralta (1–0)	**Steckenrider** (0–1)	McGee (1)	8,392	1–1	L1
3	April 3	Giants	4–0	**Flexen** (1–0)	Webb (0–1)	**Montero** (1)	8,651	2–1	W1
4	April 5	White Sox	0–6	Rodón (1–0)	**Sheffield** (0–1)	—	6,436	2–2	L1
5	April 6	White Sox	4–10	Giolito (1–0)	**Margevicius** (0–1)	—	7,980	2–3	L2
6	April 7	White Sox	8–4	**Vest** (1–0)	Foster (0–1)	—	7,429	3–3	W1
7	April 8	@ Twins	2–10	Berríos (2–0)	**Gonzales** (0–1)	—	9,675	3–4	L2
8	April 10	@ Twins	4–3 (10)	**Graveman** (1–0)	Rogers (0–1)	**Middleton** (1)	9,817	4–4	W1
9	April 11	@ Twins	8–6	**Steckenrider** (1–1)	Colomé (0–1)	**Montero** (2)	9,792	5–4	W2
–	April 12	@ Orioles	Postponed (Rain, makeup: April 13)						
10	April 13 (1)	@ Orioles	4–3 (8)	**Montero** (1–0)	Scott (0–1)	**Graveman** (1)	N/A	6–4	W3
11	April 13 (2)	@ Orioles	6–7 (7)	Valdez (2–0)	**Sadler** (0–1)	—	4,147	6–5	L1
–	April 14	@ Orioles	Postponed (Rain, makeup: April 15)						
12	April 15 (1)	@ Orioles	4–2 (7)	**Gonzales** (1–1)	Scott (0–2)	**Graveman** (2)	N/A	7–5	W1
13	April 15 (2)	@ Orioles	2–1 (7)	**Dunn** (1–0)	Zimmermann (1–1)	**Middleton** (2)	5,060	8–5	W2
14	April 16	Astros	6–5	**Misiewicz** (2–0)	Stanek (0–1)	—	8,967	9–5	W3
15	April 17	Astros	0–1	Greinke (2–1)	**Flexen** (1–1)	Pressly (1)	8,960	9–6	L1
16	April 18	Astros	7–2	**Newsome** (1–0)	Odorizzi (0–2)	—	8,959	10–6	W1
17	April 19	Dodgers	4–3	**Sheffield** (1–1)	May (1–1)	**Montero** (3)	8,999	11–6	W2
18	April 20	Dodgers	0–1	Urías (3–0)	**Gonzales** (1–2)	Jansen (4)	8,998	11–7	L1
19	April 22	@ Red Sox	7–3 (10)	**Montero** (2–0)	Hernández (0–1)	—	4,617	12–7	W1
20	April 23	@ Red Sox	5–6	Sawamura (1–0)	**Kikuchi** (0–1)	—	4,646	12–8	L1
21	April 24	@ Red Sox	8–2	**Flexen** (2–1)	Eovaldi (3–2)	—	4,621	13–8	W1
22	April 25	@ Red Sox	3–5	Rodríguez (4–0)	**Margevicius** (0–2)	Barnes (4)	4,510	13–9	L1
23	April 26	@ Astros	2–5	Urquidy (1–2)	**Sheffield** (1–2)	Pressly (2)	11,862	13–10	L2
24	April 27	@ Astros	0–2	Javier (3–0)	**Gonzales** (1–3)	Pressly (3)	14,413	13–11	L3
25	April 28	@ Astros	5–7	Smith (1–1)	**Montero** (2–1)	Stanek (1)	12,707	13–12	L4
26	April 29	@ Astros	1–0	**Kikuchi** (1–1)	García (0–3)	**Graveman** (3)	14,149	14–12	W1
27	April 30	Angels	7–4	**Steckenrider** (2–1)	Heaney (1–2)	—	8,632	15–12	W2

May: 13–15 (Home: 10–7; Away: 3–8)

#	Date	Opponent	Score	Win	Loss	Save	Attendance	Record	Streak
28	May 1	Angels	5–10	Canning (2–2)	**Newsome** (1–1)	—	8,993	15–13	L1
29	May 2	Angels	2–0	**Sheffield** (2–2)	Bundy (0–3)	**Montero** (4)	9,000	16–13	W1
30	May 3	Orioles	3–5	Sulser (1–0)	**Misiewicz** (2–1)	Valdez (7)	5,776	16–14	L1
31	May 4	Orioles	5–2	**Montero** (3–1)	Lakins (1–3)	—	6,504	17–14	W1
32	May 5	Orioles	0–6	Means (4–0)	**Kikuchi** (1–2)	—	6,742	17–15	L1
33	May 7	@ Rangers	5–4	**Flexen** (3–1)	Sborz (3–2)	**Graveman** (4)	26,047	18–15	W1
34	May 8	@ Rangers	8–9	King (4–1)	**Misiewicz** (2–2)	Kennedy (10)	26,616	18–16	L1
35	May 9	@ Rangers	2–10	Dunning (2–2)	**Sheffield** (2–3)	—	30,632	18–17	L2
36	May 11	@ Dodgers	4–6	Cleavinger (1–3)	**Montero** (3–2)	Jansen (6)	15,570	18–18	L3
37	May 12	@ Dodgers	1–7	Urías (5–1)	**Dunn** (1–1)	—	15,586	18–19	L4
38	May 13	Indians	2–4	Plesac (3–3)	**Gilbert** (0–1)	Shaw (1)	9,880	18–20	L5
39	May 14	Indians	7–3	**Flexen** (4–1)	Civale (5–1)	**Montero** (5)	10,014	19–20	W1
40	May 15	Indians	7–3	**Sheffield** (3–3)	McKenzie (1–2)	—	10,311	20–20	W2
41	May 16	Indians	3–2	**Sewald** (1–0)	Bieber (4–3)	**Graveman** (5)	10,287	21–20	W3
42	May 17	Tigers	1–4	Mize (3–3)	**Kikuchi** (1–3)	Fulmer (3)	7,201	21–21	L1
43	May 18	Tigers	0–5	Turnbull (3–2)	**Dunn** (1–2)	—	6,883	21–22	L2
44	May 19	Tigers	2–6	Skubal (1–6)	**Gilbert** (0–2)	—	8.462	21–23	L3
45	May 21	@ Padres	1–16	Paddack (2–3)	**Flexen** (4–2)	—	15,250	21–24	L4
46	May 22	@ Padres	4–6	Stammen (3–1)	**Sheffield** (3–4)	Melancon (16)	15,250	21–25	L5
47	May 23	@ Padres	2–9	Darvish (5–1)	**Misiewicz** (2–3)	—	15,250	21–26	L6
48	May 24	@ Athletics	4–2	**Kikuchi** (2–3)	Montas (5–4)	**Middleton** (3)	3,019	22–26	W1
49	May 25	@ Athletics	4–3	**Sewald** (2–0)	Irvin (3–6)	**Montero** (6)	2,865	23–26	W2
50	May 26	@ Athletics	3–6	Kaprielian (2–0)	**Dugger** (0–1)	Diekman (6)	3,571	23–27	L1
51	May 27	Rangers	5–0	**Flexen** (5–2)	Allard (1–1)	—	9,008	24–27	W1
52	May 28	Rangers	3–2	**Sheffield** (4–4)	Lyles (2–4)	**Swanson** (1)	10,605	25–27	W2
53	May 29	Rangers	3–2	**Zamora** (1–0)	Foltynewicz (1–5)	**Montero** (7)	11,071	26–27	W3
54	May 30	Rangers	4–2	**Kikuchi** (3–3)	Yang (0–3)	**Middleton** (4)	11,198	27–27	W4
55	May 31	Athletics	6–5 (10)	**Zamora** (2–0)	Trivino (2–2)	—	11,112	28–27	W5

June: 14–12 (Home: 7–4; Away: 7–8)

#	Date	Opponent	Score	Win	Loss	Save	Attendance	Record	Streak
56	June 1	Athletics	6–12	Luzardo (2–3)	**Sewald** (2–1)	—	9,160	28–28	L1
57	June 2	Athletics	0–6	Manaea (4–2)	**Flexen** (5–3)	—	9,588	28–29	L2
58	June 3	@ Angels	6–2	**Sheffield** (5–4)	Canning (4–4)	—	9,714	29–29	W1
59	June 4	@ Angels	2–3	Ohtani (2–1)	**Santiago** (0–1)	Iglesias (10)	15,141	29–30	L1
60	June 5	@ Angels	5–12	Cobb (4–2)	**Steckenrider** (2–2)	—	15,071	29–31	L2
61	June 6	@ Angels	9–5	**Gilbert** (1–2)	**Sandoval** (0–2)	—	12,833	30–31	W1
62	June 8	@ Tigers	3–5	Boyd (3–6)	**Gonzales** (1–4)	Cisnero (2)	9,081	30–32	L1
63	June 9	@ Tigers	9–6 (11)	**Chargois** (1–0)	Norris (0–2)	—	9,162	31–32	W1
64	June 10	@ Tigers	3–8	Jiménez (1–0)	**Sheffield** (5–5)	—	9,290	31–33	L1
65	June 11	@ Indians	0–7	Civale (9–2)	**Dunn** (1–3)	—	22,970	31–34	L2
66	June 12	@ Indians	4–5 (10)	Karinchak (3–2)	**Sewald** (2–2)	—	20,116	31–35	L3
67	June 13	@ Indians	6–2	**Gilbert** (2–2)	Bieber (7–4)	—	17,371	32–35	W1
68	June 14	Twins	4–3	**Sewald** (3–2)	Robles (2–3)	**Steckenrider** (1)	9,185	33–35	W2
69	June 15	Twins	10–0	**Flexen** (6–3)	Happ (3–3)	—	7,669	34–35	W3
70	June 16	Twins	2–7	Thielbar (1–0)	**Sheffield** (5–6)	—	8,098	34–36	L1
71	June 17	Rays	6–5	**Santiago** (1–1)	Fairbanks (1–2)	—	9,092	35–36	W1
72	June 18	Rays	5–1	**Kikuchi** (4–3)	Wacha (1–2)	—	12,654	36–36	W2
73	June 19	Rays	6–5 (10)	**Montero** (4–2)	Feyereisen (3–3)	—	14,772	37–36	W3
74	June 20	Rays	6–2 (10)	**Montero** (5–2)	Castillo (2–4)	—	18,172	38–36	W4
75	June 22	Rockies	2–1	**Sewald** (4–2)	Kinley (1–2)	**Graveman** (6)	12,879	39–36	W5
76	June 23	Rockies	2–5	Márquez (6–6)	**Sheffield** (5–7)	Bard (10)	11,141	39–37	L1
77	June 25	@ White Sox	9–3	**Kikuchi** (5–3)	Rodón (6–3)	—	32,189	40–37	W1
—	June 26	@ White Sox	Suspended (Rain, continuation: June 27)						
78	June 27 (1)	@ White Sox	3–2	**Sewald** (5–2)	Hendriks (3–2)	**Graveman** (7)	30,017	41–37	W2
79	June 27 (2)	@ White Sox	5–7 (7)	Bummer (1–4)	**Dugger** (0–2)	Hendriks (20)	30,017	41–38	L1
80	June 29	@ Blue Jays	3–9	Ray (6–3)	**Montero** (5–3)	—	6,736	41–39	L2
81	June 30	@ Blue Jays	9–7 (10)	**Graveman** (2–0)	Murphy (0–1)	**Steckenrider** (2)	6,632	42–39	W1

July: 14–10 (Home: 9–7; Away: 5–3)

#	Date	Opponent	Score	Win	Loss	Save	Attendance	Record	Streak
82	July 1	@ Blue Jays	7–2	**Kikuchi** (6–3)	Ryu (7–5)	**Sewald** (1)	5,456	43–39	W2
83	July 2	Rangers	5–4 (10)	**Misiewicz** (3–3)	Hearn (2–3)	—	28,638	44–39	W3
84	July 3	Rangers	3–7	Lyles (4–5)	**Gonzales** (1–5)	—	16,046	44–40	L1
85	July 4	Rangers	4–1	**Flexen** (7–3)	Foltynewicz (2–8)	**Graveman** (8)	15,146	45–40	W1
86	July 6	Yankees	1–12	Taillon (4–4)	**Sheffield** (5–8)	—	16,547	45–41	L1
87	July 7	Yankees	4–5	Cessa (2–1)	**Kikuchi** (6–4)	Green (3)	17,205	45–42	L2
88	July 8	Yankees	4–0	**Gilbert** (3–2)	Montgomery (3–4)	—	17,524	46–42	W1
89	July 9	Angels	7–3	**Steckenrider** (3–2)	Mayers (2–4)	—	20,381	47–42	W2
90	July 10	Angels	2–0	**Flexen** (8–3)	Sandoval (2–3)	**Sewald** (2)	27,353	48–42	W3
91	July 11	Angels	1–7	Suárez (4–2)	**Ramírez** (0–1)	Iglesias (19)	23,348	48–43	L1
–	July 13	**91st All-Star Game in Denver, CO**							
92	July 16	@ Angels	6–5	**Flexen** (9–3)	Heaney (5–7)	**Sewald** (3)	40,880	49–43	W1
93	July 17	@ Angels	4–9	Cobb (7–3)	**Kikuchi** (6–5)	—	28,927	49–44	L1
94	July 18	@ Angels	7–4	**Gilbert** (4–2)	Sandoval (2–4)	—	23,434	50–44	W1
95	July 20	@ Rockies	6–4	**Gonzales** (2–5)	Márquez (8–7)	**Graveman** (9)	30,715	51–44	W2
96	July 21	@ Rockies	3–6	Gomber (7–5)	**Middleton** (0–1)	Bard (15)	25,053	51–45	L1
97	July 22	Athletics	1–4	Manaea (7–6)	**Flexen** (9–4)	Trivino (16)	18,553	51–46	L2
98	July 23	Athletics	4–3	**Sewald** (6–2)	Diekman (2–2)	**Graveman** (10)	21,312	52–46	W1
99	July 24	Athletics	5–4	**Graveman** (3–0)	Trivino (3–4)	—	30,843	53–46	W2
100	July 25	Athletics	4–3	**Gonzales** (3–5)	Irvin (7–9)	**Steckenrider** (3)	21,501	54–46	W3
101	July 26	Astros	11–8	**Graveman** (4–0)	Stanek (1–2)	**Sewald** (4)	15,162	55–46	W4
102	July 27	Astros	6–8	McCullers Jr. (8–2)	**Flexen** (9–5)	—	18,930	55–47	L1
103	July 28	Astros	4–11	Odorizzi (4–5)	**Kikuchi** (6–6)	—	18,908	55–48	L2
104	July 30	@ Rangers	9–5	**Gilbert** (5–2)	Allard (2–9)	—	27,542	56–48	W1
105	July 31	@ Rangers	4–5 (10)	Patton (1–1)	**Castillo** (2–5)	—	33,463	56–49	L1

August: 15–13 (Home: 6–6; Away: 9–7)

#	Date	Opponent	Score	Win	Loss	Save	Attendance	Record	Streak
106	August 1	@ Rangers	3–4	Santana (1–1)	**Swanson** (0–1)	—	23,664	56–50	L2
107	August 2	@ Rays	8–2	**Flexen** (10–5)	Wacha (2–3)	—	5,855	57–50	W1
108	August 3	@ Rays	4–2	**Kikuchi** (7–6)	Patiño (2–3)	**Castillo** (15)	10,071	58–50	W2
109	August 4	@ Rays	3–4	Fleming (9–5)	**Gilbert** (5–3)	Sherriff (1)	9,701	58–51	L1
110	August 5	@ Yankees	3–5	Green (5–5)	**Sewald** (6–3)	Chapman (23)	33,211	58–52	L2
111	August 6	@ Yankees	2–3 (11)	Abreu (1–0)	**Middleton** (0–2)	—	43,180	58–53	L3
112	August 7	@ Yankees	4–5	Heaney (7–8)	**Misiewicz** (3–4)	Loáisiga (4)	35,165	58–54	L4
113	August 8	@ Yankees	2–0	**Sewald** (7–3)	Luetge (4–2)	**Steckenrider** (4)	35,437	59–54	W1
114	August 10	Rangers	4–5 (10)	Martin (3–3)	**Swanson** (0–2)	—	15,412	59–55	L1
115	August 11	Rangers	2–1	**Steckenrider** (4–2)	Santana (1–2)	—	15,789	60–55	W1
116	August 12	Rangers	3–1	**Gonzales** (4–5)	Foltynewicz (2–11)	—	14,031	61–55	W2
117	August 13	Blue Jays	3–2	**Steckenrider** (5–2)	Cimber (2–4)	—	28,207	62–55	W3
118	August 14	Blue Jays	9–3	**Middleton** (1–2)	Ryu (11–6)	—	26,090	63–55	W4
119	August 15	Blue Jays	3–8	Matz (10–7)	**Gilbert** (5–4)	—	22,679	63–56	L1
120	August 17	@ Rangers	3–1	**Anderson** (6–8)	Hearn (2–4)	**Sewald** (5)	15,140	64–56	W1
121	August 18	@ Rangers	3–1	**Gonzales** (5–5)	Foltynewicz (2–12)	**Steckenrider** (5)	19,119	65–56	W2
122	August 19	@ Rangers	9–8 (11)	**Smith** (2–1)	Barlow (0–1)	**Sewald** (6)	16,391	66–56	W3
123	August 20	@ Astros	3–12	McCullers Jr. (10–4)	**Kikuchi** (7–7)	—	26,899	66–57	L1
124	August 21	@ Astros	1–15	Odorizzi (6–6)	**Gilbert** (5–5)	—	29,908	66–58	L2
125	August 22	@ Astros	6–3 (11)	**Sewald** (8–3)	Stanek (1–3)	**Ramírez** (1)	27,526	67–58	W1
126	August 23	@ Athletics	5–3	**Misiewicz** (4–4)	Trivino (5–6)	**Sewald** (7)	4,140	68–58	W2
127	August 24	@ Athletics	5–1	**Flexen** (11–5)	Irvin (9–12)	**Steckenrider** (6)	4,508	69–58	W3
128	August 26	Royals	4–6	Santana (1–1)	**Smith** (2–2)	Barlow (9)	16,882	69–59	L1
129	August 27	Royals	7–8 (12)	Staumont (3–2)	**Ramírez** (0–2)	—	22,953	69–60	L2
130	August 28	Royals	2–4	Payamps (1–3)	**Anderson** (6–9)	Barlow (10)	24,575	69–61	L3
131	August 29	Royals	4–3	**Gonzales** (6–5)	Zuber (0–3)	**Steckenrider** (7)	20,044	70–61	W1
132	August 30	Astros	3–4	Maton (4–0)	**Smith** (2–3)	Pressly (22)	11,630	70–62	L1
133	August 31	Astros	4–0	**Sewald** (9–3)	Graveman (5–1)	—	10,452	71–62	W1

September: 18–8 (Home: 6–4; Away: 12–4)

#	Date	Opponent	Score	Win	Loss	Save	Attendance	Record	Streak
134	September 1	Astros	1–0	**Sheffield** (6–8)	Odorizzi (6–7)	**Sewald** (8)	10,519	72–62	W2
135	September 3	@ Diamondbacks	6–5 (10)	**Sheffield** (7–8)	Clarke (1–2)	**Ramírez** (2)	12,729	73–62	W3
136	September 4	@ Diamondbacks	8–5	**Gonzales** (7–5)	Smith (4–9)	**Castillo** (16)	18,819	74–62	W4
137	September 5	@ Diamondbacks	10–4 (11)	**Ramírez** (1–2)	Clarke (1–3)	—	14,408	75–62	W5
138	September 6	@ Astros	2–11	McCullers Jr. (11–4)	**Kikuchi** (7–8)	Bielak (1)	25,802	75–63	L1
139	September 7	@ Astros	4–5 (10)	Stanek (2–4)	**Ramírez** (1–3)	—	20,353	75–64	L2
140	September 8	@ Astros	8–5	**Castillo** (3–5)	Pressly (5–2)	—	19,089	76–64	W1
141	September 10	Diamondbacks	5–4	**Gonzales** (8–5)	Bumgarner (7–10)	**Steckenrider** (8)	14,379	77–64	W2
142	September 11	Diamondbacks	3–7	Castellanos (2–1)	**Flexen** (11–6)	—	15,483	77–65	L1
143	September 12	Diamondbacks	4–5	Gilbert (2–2)	**Misiewicz** (4–5)	Wendelken (1)	13,551	77–66	L2
144	September 13	Red Sox	5–4	**Castillo** (4–5)	Brasier (0–1)	**Steckenrider** (9)	18,219	78–66	W1
145	September 14	Red Sox	4–8	Ottavino (6–3)	**Smith** (2–4)	—	19,887	78–67	L1
146	September 15	Red Sox	4–9 (10)	Ottavino (7–3)	**Swanson** (0–3)	—	17,860	78–68	L2
147	September 17	@ Royals	6–2	**Flexen** (12–6)	Heasley (0–1)	—	14,904	79–68	W1
148	September 18	@ Royals	1–8	Bubic (5–6)	**Kikuchi** (7–9)	—	20,085	79–69	L1
149	September 19	@ Royals	7–1	**Gilbert** (6–5)	Kowar (0–4)	—	16,872	80–69	W1
150	September 20	@ Athletics	4–2	**Anderson** (7–9)	Manaea (10–10)	**Sewald** (9)	4,068	81–69	W2
151	September 21	@ Athletics	5–2	**Gonzales** (9–5)	Blackburn (1–3)	**Steckenrider** (10)	4,246	82–69	W3
152	September 22	@ Athletics	4–1	**Flexen** (13–6)	Irvin (10–14)	**Steckenrider** (11)	4,149	83–69	W4
153	September 23	@ Athletics	6–5	**Smith** (3–4)	Diekman (3–3)	**Sewald** (10)	4,966	84–69	W5
154	September 24	@ Angels	6–5	**Smith** (4–4)	Herget (2–2)	**Sewald** (11)	18,551	85–69	W6
155	September 25	@ Angels	1–14	Díaz (1–0)	**Anderson** (7–10)	—	30,221	85–70	L1
156	September 26	@ Angels	5–1	**Gonzales** (10–5)	Quijada (0–2)	—	22,057	86–70	W1
157	September 27	Athletics	13–4	**Flexen** (14–6)	Irvin (10–15)	—	11,169	87–70	W2
158	September 28	Athletics	4–2	**Misiewicz** (5–5)	Petit (8–3)	**Steckenrider** (12)	12,635	88–70	W3
159	September 29	Athletics	4–2	**Castillo** (5–5)	Chafin (2–4)	**Steckenrider** (13)	17,366	89–70	W4

October: 1–2 (Home: 1–2; Away: 0–0)

#	Date	Opponent	Score	Win	Loss	Save	Attendance	Record	Streak
160	October 1	Angels	1–2	Suárez (8–8)	**Gonzales** (10–6)	Iglesias (34)	44,169	89–71	L1
161	October 2	Angels	6–4	**Sewald** (10–3)	Cishek (0–2)	**Steckenrider** (14)	44,414	90–71	W1
162	October 3	Angels	3–7	Ortega (1–1)	**Anderson** (7–11)	—	44,229	90–72	L1

Legend: = Win = Loss = Postponement
**Bold** = Mariners team member

== Roster ==
2021 Seattle Mariners
Roster
Pitchers: 31 Tyler Anderson; 27 Matt Andriese; 63 Diego Castillo; 84 J. T. Chargois; 62 Sean Doolittle; 30 Robert Dugger; 35 Justin Dunn; 41 Aaron Fletcher; 77 Chris Flexen; 36 Logan Gilbert; 7 Marco Gonzales; 49 Kendall Graveman; 18 Yusei Kikuchi; 62 Brady Lail; 52 Nick Margevicius; 45 Darren McCaughan; 99 Keynan Middleton; 40 Wyatt Mills; 38 Anthony Misiewicz; 47 Rafael Montero; 54 Andrés Muñoz; 74 Ljay Newsome; 46 Vinny Nittoli; 44 James Paxton; 55 Yohan Ramírez; 45 Yacksel Ríos; 65 Casey Sadler; 57 Hector Santiago; 37 Paul Sewald; 33 Justus Sheffield; 43 Joe Smith; 16 Drew Steckenrider; 50 Erik Swanson; 45 Domingo Tapia; 53 Will Vest; 53 Ryan Weber; 62 Daniel Zamora	Catchers: 78 José Godoy; 2 Tom Murphy; 29 Cal Raleigh; 22 Luis Torrens; Infielders: 5 Eric Campbell; 3 J. P. Crawford; 23 Ty France; 26 José Marmolejos; 8 Jack Mayfield; 25 Dylan Moore; 13 Jacob Nottingham; 15 Kyle Seager; 13 Abraham Toro; 31,8 Donnie Walton; 12 Evan White	Outfielders: 5 Jake Bauers; 5 Braden Bishop; 28 Jake Fraley; 0 Sam Haggerty; 17 Mitch Haniger; 10 Jarred Kelenic; 1 Kyle Lewis; 4 Shed Long Jr.; 27 Dillon Thomas; 20 Taylor Trammell; Other batters: 30 Kevin Padlo	Manager: 9 Scott Servais; Coaches: 14 Manny Acta (third base); 66 Fleming Baez (bullpen catcher); 79 Trent Blank (bullpen); 89 Nasusel Cabrera (batting practice pitcher); 88 Jarret DeHart (assistant hitting); 6 Perry Hill (first base); 21 Tim Laker (hitting); 48 Jared Sandberg (bench); 39 Carson Vitale (field coordinator); 32 Pete Woodworth (pitching)

== Statistics ==
=== Batting ===
Stats in bold are the team leaders.

Note: G = Games played; AB = At bats; R = Runs; H = Hits; 2B = Doubles; 3B = Triples; HR = Home runs; RBI = Runs batted in; SB = Stolen bases; BB = Walks; AVG = Batting average; TB = Total bases

Player	G	AB	R	H	2B	3B	HR	RBI	SB	BB	AVG	TB
Mitch Haniger	157	**620**	**110**	157	23	**2**	**39**	100	1	54	.253	**301**
JP Crawford	**160**	619	89	**169**	**37**	0	9	54	3	58	.273	233
Kyle Seager	159	603	73	128	29	1	35	**101**	3	**59**	.212	264
Ty France	152	571	85	166	32	1	18	73	0	46	**.291**	254
Luis Torrens	108	346	39	84	16	**2**	18	47	0	28	.243	149
Jarred Kelenic	93	337	41	61	13	1	14	43	6	36	.181	118
Dylan Moore	126	332	42	60	11	**2**	12	43	**21**	40	.181	111
Tom Murphy	97	277	35	56	8	0	11	34	0	40	.202	97
Abraham Toro	60	226	28	57	11	0	5	26	3	22	.252	83
Jake Fraley	78	214	27	45	7	0	9	36	10	46	.210	79
Jake Bauers	72	182	20	40	4	0	2	13	6	18	.220	50
Taylor Trammell	51	156	23	25	7	0	8	18	2	17	.160	56
Cal Raleigh	47	139	6	25	12	0	2	13	0	7	.180	43
Kyle Lewis	36	130	15	32	4	0	5	11	2	16	.246	51
Shed Long Jr.	34	111	13	22	4	1	4	17	1	9	.198	40
José Marmolejos	41	106	11	17	4	0	4	12	0	15	.160	33
Evan White	30	97	8	14	3	0	2	9	0	6	.144	23
Sean Haggerty	35	86	15	16	3	0	2	5	5	6	.186	25
Donovan Walton	24	63	6	13	2	1	2	7	1	4	.206	23
José Godoy	16	37	2	6	1	0	0	3	0	3	.162	7
Jack Mayfield	11	34	2	6	1	0	0	3	0	1	.176	7
Jacob Nottingham	10	26	3	3	0	0	1	2	0	2	.115	6
Eric Campbell	4	11	1	3	0	0	0	0	0	1	.273	3
Dillon Thomas	4	9	2	1	0	0	0	2	0	0	.111	1
Braden Bishop	8	4	1	1	0	0	0	0	0	0	.250	1
Marco Gonzalez	2	4	0	0	0	0	0	0	0	0	.000	0
Chris Flexen	2	3	0	0	0	0	0	0	0	0	.000	0
Justin Dunn	2	3	0	1	1	0	0	1	0	0	.333	2
Tyler Anderson	1	2	0	0	0	0	0	0	0	1	.000	0
Yusei Kikuchi	1	2	0	0	0	0	0	0	0	0	.000	0
Darren McCaughan	1	2	0	0	0	0	0	0	0	0	.000	0
Justus Sheffield	2	2	0	1	0	0	0	0	0	0	.500	1
Kevin Padlo	1	1	0	0	0	0	0	0	0	0	.000	0
**Team totals**	**162**	**5355**	**697**	**1209**	**233**	**11**	**199**	**673**	**64**	**535**	**.226**	**2061**

=== Pitching ===
Stats in bold are the team leaders.

Note: W = Wins; L = Losses; ERA = Earned run average; G = Games pitched; GS = Games started; SV = Saves; IP = Innings pitched; R = Runs allowed; ER = Earned runs allowed; BB = Walks allowed; K = Strikeouts

Player	W	L	ERA	G	GS	SV	IP	H	R	ER	BB	K
Chris Flexen	**14**	6	**3.61**	31	**31**	0	**179.2**	**185**	74	72	40	125
Yusei Kikuchi	7	**9**	4.41	29	29	0	157.0	145	**82**	**77**	**62**	**163**
Marco Gonzales	10	6	3.96	25	25	0	143.1	125	64	63	42	108
Logan Gilbert	6	5	4.68	24	24	0	119.1	112	63	62	28	128
Justus Sheffield	7	8	6.83	21	15	0	80.1	105	69	61	43	63
Drew Steckenrider	5	2	2.00	62	0	**14**	67.2	52	16	15	17	58
Paul Sewald	10	3	3.06	62	0	11	64.2	42	24	22	24	104
Tyler Anderson	2	3	4.81	13	13	0	63.2	71	35	34	13	48
Anthony Misiewicz	5	5	4.61	**66**	0	0	54.2	61	30	28	15	53
Justin Dunn	1	3	3.75	11	11	0	50.1	37	21	21	29	49
Rafael Montero	5	3	7.27	40	0	7	43.1	56	39	35	15	37
Casey Sadler	0	1	0.67	42	0	0	40.1	19	4	3	10	37
Erik Swanson	0	3	3.31	33	2	1	35.1	28	18	13	10	35
Will Vest	1	0	6.17	32	0	0	35.0	38	25	24	18	27
Kendall Graveman	4	0	0.82	30	0	10	33.0	15	7	3	8	34
Keynan Middleton	1	2	4.94	32	1	4	31.0	30	20	17	19	24
JT Chargois	1	0	3.00	31	0	0	30.0	23	11	10	6	29
Yohan Ramírez	1	3	3.90	25	0	2	27.2	18	14	12	12	35
Hector Santiago	1	1	3.42	13	1	0	26.1	27	10	10	11	30
Robert Dugger	0	2	7.36	12	4	0	25.2	34	24	21	12	19
Diego Castillo	3	1	2.86	24	0	2	22.0	14	9	7	7	26
Joe Smith	3	3	2.00	23	0	0	18.0	12	5	4	4	17
Ljay Newsome	1	1	7.98	7	1	0	14.2	20	14	13	3	16
Wyatt Mills	0	0	9.95	11	0	0	12.2	19	14	14	7	11
Nick Margevicius	0	2	8.25	5	3	0	12.0	13	16	11	7	12
Sean Doolittle	0	0	4.76	11	0	0	11.1	10	6	6	5	12
Matt Andriese	0	0	2.45	8	0	0	11.0	10	6	3	2	12
Darren McCaughan	0	0	8.00	2	1	0	9.0	8	8	8	4	2
Daniel Zamora	2	0	6.23	4	0	0	4.1	5	4	3	1	3
Aaron Fletcher	0	0	12.27	4	0	0	3.2	7	5	5	1	2
Ryan Weber	0	0	6.00	2	0	0	3.0	1	2	2	2	1
Yacksel Ríos	0	0	9.00	3	0	0	3.0	5	3	3	2	2
Domingo Tapia	0	0	0.00	2	0	0	2.0	4	0	0	1	1
Brady Lail	0	0	13.50	2	0	0	2.0	4	3	3	0	1
James Paxton	0	0	6.75	1	1	0	1.1	0	1	1	1	2
Vinny Nittoli	0	0	18.00	1	0	0	1.0	1	2	2	2	1
Andrés Muñoz	0	0	0.00	1	0	0	0.2	0	0	0	2	1
Jack Mayfield	0	0	0.00	1	0	0	0.1	0	0	0	0	0
**Team totals**	**90**	**72**	**4.30**	**162**	**162**	**51**	**1440.1**	**1356**	**748**	**688**	**485**	**1328**

== Farm system ==
Level	Team	League	Manager
AAA	Tacoma Rainiers	Triple-A West	Kristopher Negrón
AA	Arkansas Travelers	Double-A Central	Collin Cowgill
High-A	Everett AquaSox	High-A West	Louis Boyd
A	Modesto Nuts	Low-A West	Eric Farris
Rookie	ACL Mariners	Arizona Complex League	Austin Knight
Foreign Rookie	DSL Mariners 1	Dominican Summer League	Luis Caballero
