= Ken Waldichuk =

American baseball player (born 1998)

Free agent
- Pitcher
- Born: January 8, 1998 (age 28); San Diego, California, U.S.
- Bats: Left Throws: Left

MLB debut
- September 1, 2022, for the Oakland Athletics

MLB statistics (through 2026 season)
- Win–loss record: 6–11
- Earned run average: 5.35
- Strikeouts: 173
- Stats at Baseball Reference

Teams
- Oakland Athletics (2022–2023); Washington Nationals (2026)

Kenneth Dieter Waldichuk (born January 8, 1998) is an American professional baseball pitcher who is a free agent. He has previously played in Major League Baseball (MLB) for the Oakland Athletics and Washington Nationals.

== Amateur career ==
Waldichuk attended University City High School in San Diego, California. He earned First-Team All League honors as a junior in 2015. Unselected in the 2016 Major League Baseball draft, he fulfilled his commitment to play college baseball at Saint Mary's College of California.

In 2017, as a freshman at Saint Mary's, Waldichuk appeared in 22 games as a relief pitcher, pitching to a 3–4 win–loss record with a 2.00 earned run average (ERA) and 51 strikeouts over 45 innings pitched. He was named to the All-West Coast Conference Freshman Team. That summer, Waldichuk pitched for the Bethesda Big Train of the Cal Ripken Collegiate Baseball League where he appeared in six games, threw 23 2/3 innings and had an ERA of 3.42. As a sophomore in 2018, he moved into the starting rotation, starting 14 games and pitching to an 8–4 record and a 2.05 ERA over 92 1/3 innings, earning All-WCC First Team honors. In 2018, he played collegiate summer baseball with the Wareham Gatemen of the Cape Cod Baseball League. In 2019, his junior year, Waldichuk made 15 starts, going 5–6 with a 3.69 ERA with 106 strikeouts over 92 2/3 innings.

== Professional career ==
=== New York Yankees ===
After the season, the New York Yankees selected Waldichuk in the fifth round (165th overall) of the 2019 Major League Baseball draft. He signed with the Yankees and made his professional debut with the Pulaski Yankees of the Rookie-level Appalachian League, going 0–2 with a 3.68 ERA over 29 1/3 innings. Waldichuk did not play in a game in 2020 due to the cancellation of the minor league season because of the COVID-19 pandemic. To begin the 2021 season, Waldichuk was assigned to the Hudson Valley Renegades of the High-A East. After throwing 30 2/3 scoreless innings to begin the year, he was promoted to the Somerset Patriots of the Double-A Northeast. Over 16 games (14 starts) with Somerset, Waldichuk pitched to a 4–3 record and 4.20 ERA with 108 strikeouts over 79 1/3 innings.

Waldichuk returned to Somerset to begin the 2022 season. After four starts in which he pitched to a 4–0 record and 1.26 ERA over 28 2/3 innings, he was promoted to the Scranton/Wilkes-Barre RailRiders of the Triple-A International League. Waldichuk was selected to represent the Yankees at the 2022 All-Star Futures Game. Over 11 starts with the RailRaiders, Waldichuk went 2-3 with a 3.59 ERA and 70 strikeouts over 47 2/3 innings.

=== Oakland Athletics ===
On August 1, 2022, the Yankees traded Waldichuk, JP Sears, Luis Medina, and Cooper Bowman to the Oakland Athletics for Frankie Montas and Lou Trivino. He was subsequently assigned to the Las Vegas Aviators of the Triple-A Pacific Coast League. The Athletics promoted Waldichuk to the major leagues on September 1 to make his major league debut the following day. On September 24, Waldichuk earned his first career victory after allowing four runs on five hits and four strikeouts across five innings of work against the New York Mets.

In 2023, Waldichuk made 35 appearances (22 starts) for Oakland, registering a 4–9 record and 5.36 ERA with 132 strikeouts across 141 innings of work. Following his last start of the 2023 season, an MRI revealed that Waldichuk had suffered a flexor tendon strain and UCL sprain in his pitching elbow. He underwent a procedure to remove scar tissue from the same elbow and elected to further undergo a non–surgical recovery process.

On May 16, 2024, Waldichuk underwent Tommy John surgery, causing him to miss the remainder of the season. He was activated from the injured list on July 19, 2025, and was subsequently optioned to Triple-A Las Vegas. Waldichuk made 17 appearances (16 starts) split between Las Vegas and the Single-A Stockton Ports, accumulating a 2-6 record and 8.17 ERA with 68 strikeouts over 54 innings of work. On December 22, Waldichuck was designated for assignment following the Athletics trade for Jeff McNeil.

=== Washington Nationals ===
On January 8, 2026, Waldichuk was claimed off waivers by the Atlanta Braves. He was designated for assignment by the Braves on January 10. On January 12, Waldichuk and Brett Wisely were traded to the Tampa Bay Rays. He was designated for assignment by the Rays on February 2. The Washington Nationals claimed Waldichuk off waivers on February 5.

Waldichuk broke camp with the Nationals but struggled over the first two weeks of the season, giving up a three-run home run on his first pitch in the major leagues since 2023 and pitching to a 6.75 ERA in five games. He suffered an elbow injury while throwing a pitch on April 12, 2026, at American Family Field and was placed on the injured list the next day. Manager Blake Butera disclosed that Waldichuk had been recommended for a second career Tommy John surgery due to elbow ligament damage. On November 2, Waldichuk was removed from the 40–man roster and elected free agency.
