= Cooper Bowman =

American baseball player (born 2000)

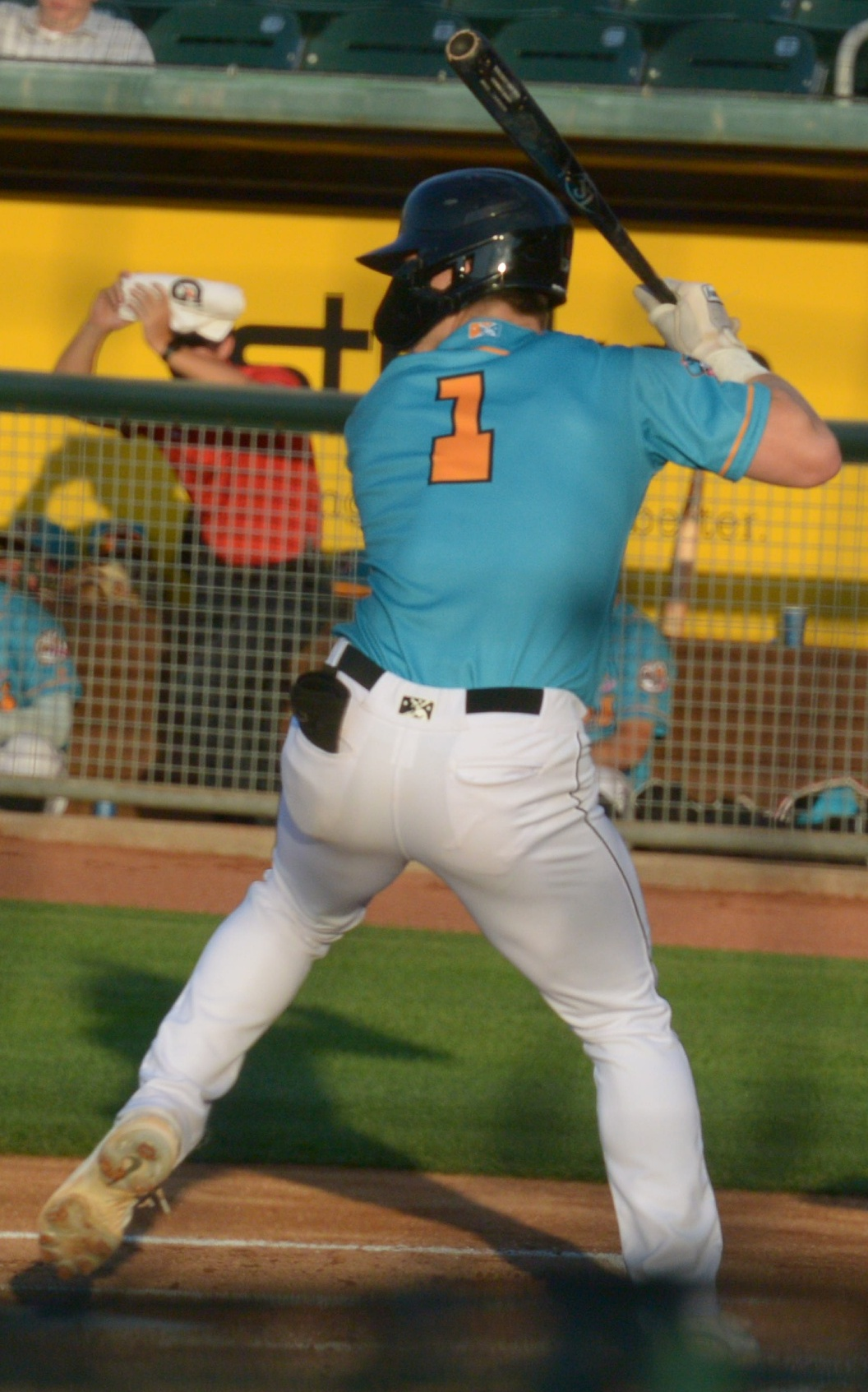
- Bowman with the Lansing Lugnuts in 2022

Free agent
- Second baseman
- Born: January 25, 2000 (age 26); Rapid City, South Dakota, U.S.
- Bats: Right Throws: Right

Cooper John Bowman (born January 25, 2000) is an American professional baseball infielder who is a free agent.

== Amateur career ==
Bowman graduated from Stevens High School in Rapid City, South Dakota. While attending Stevens, he played American Legion baseball for the Post 22 Hardhats where he won three state championships. He enrolled at Iowa Western Community College, where he played college baseball.

After two years at Iowa Western, Bowman transferred to the University of Louisville to play for the Louisville Cardinals. He batted .293 with eight home runs and 22 runs batted in (RBIs) for the Cardinals.

== Professional career ==
=== New York Yankees ===
The New York Yankees drafted Bowman in the fourth round, with the 122nd overall selection, of the 2021 Major League Baseball draft. He split his first professional season between the rookie-level Florida Complex League Yankees and the Single-A Tampa Tarpons, hitting .255 with four home runs, 23 RBIs, and 13 stolen bases in 31 games. In 2022, Bowman played for the High-A Hudson Valley Renegades, for whom he batted .217/.343/.355 with eight home runs, 35 RBIs, and 35 stolen bases across 80 appearances.

=== Oakland Athletics / Athletics ===
The Yankees traded Bowman, Ken Waldichuk, JP Sears, and Luis Medina to the Oakland Athletics for Frankie Montas and Lou Trivino on August 1, 2022. He played in 33 games for the High-A Lansing Lugnuts down the stretch, batting .209 with three home runs, 12 RBI, and 12 stolen bases. Bowman split the 2023 campaign between the rookie-level Arizona Complex League Athletics and Double-A Midland RockHounds, posting a cumulative .262/.360/.431 batting line with eight home runs, 40 RBIs, and 38 stolen bases.

While playing for Midland in the Texas League, Bowman was named the league's player of the week for July 22–28, 2024. In the 2024 season, he made 118 appearances split between Midland and the Triple-A Las Vegas Aviators, hitting .262/.351/.419 with 43 stolen bases and career-highs in home runs (14) and RBIs (70).

On December 11, 2024, at the Winter Meetings, the Cincinnati Reds selected Bowman in the Rule 5 draft. On March 12, 2025, Bowman was returned to the Athletics organization. He spent the majority of the season with Triple-A Las Vegas, hitting .236/.326/.375 with six home runs, 41 RBI, and 21 stolen bases across 72 games.

=== Tampa Bay Rays ===
On March 23, 2025, the Athletics traded Bowman to the Tampa Bay Rays in exchange for Gerlin Rosario.

Bowman made 20 appearances for the Triple-A Durham Bulls in 2026, batting .148/.257/.213 with seven RBI and six stolen bases. Bowman was released by the Rays organization on June 25, 2026.

== See also ==
- Rule 5 draft results
