= Luis Medina (pitcher) =

Dominican baseball player (born 1999)

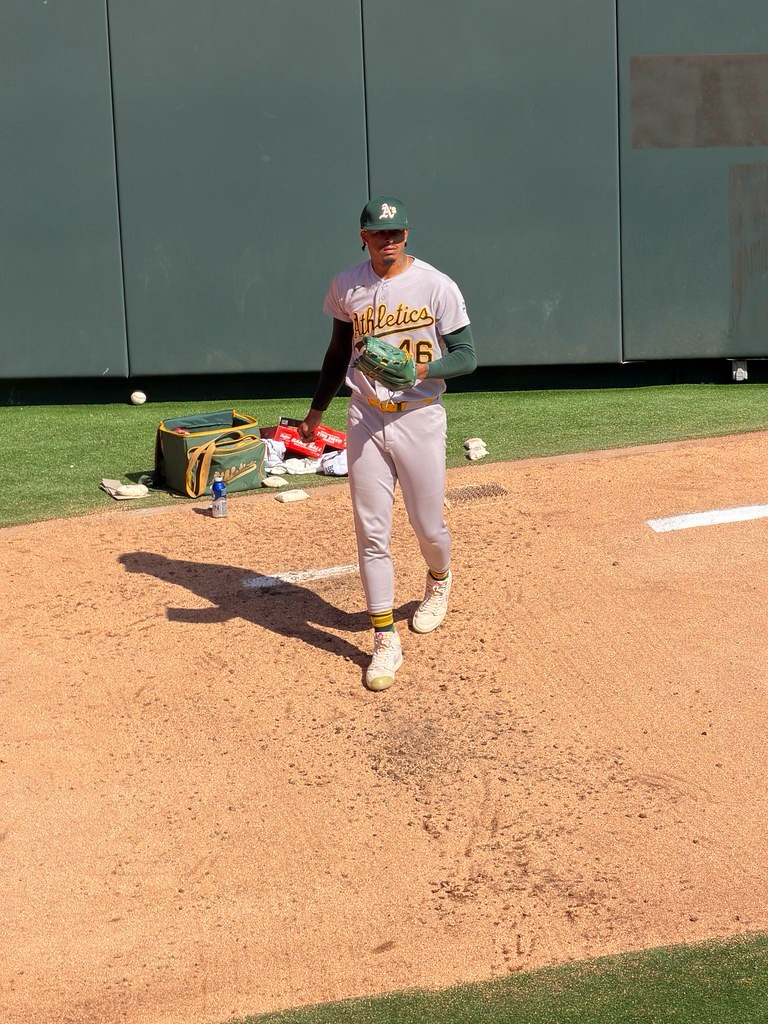
- Medina warming up with the A’s (2026)

Athletics – No. 46
- Pitcher
- Born: May 3, 1999 (age 27); Nagua, Dominican Republic
- Bats: Right Throws: Right

MLB debut
- April 26, 2023, for the Oakland Athletics

MLB statistics (through September 23, 2026)
- Win–loss record: 11–17
- Earned run average: 4.62
- Strikeouts: 230
- Stats at Baseball Reference

Teams
- Oakland Athletics \ Athletics (2023–2024, 2026–present)

Luis Ángel Medina (born May 3, 1999) is a Dominican professional baseball pitcher for the Athletics of Major League Baseball (MLB). He made his MLB debut in 2023.

== Career ==
=== New York Yankees ===
Medina signed with the New York Yankees as an international free agent on July 8, 2015. He made his professional debut in 2016 with the Dominican Summer League Yankees. In 2017 he pitched for the Dominican Summer League Yankees and Pulaski Yankees, making 10 appearances (9 starts) and logging a 5.35 ERA with 39 strikeouts in 38 2/3 innings of work.

Medina returned to Pulaski for the 2018 season, making 12 starts and recording a 6.25 ERA with 47 strikeouts in 36.0 innings pitched. Medina started 2019 with the Single–A Charleston RiverDogs and was promoted to the High–A Tampa Yankees during the season. In 22 total starts, he accumulated a 1–8 record and 5.47 ERA with 127 strikeouts in 103 2/3 innings of work.

On November 20, 2019, the Yankees added Medina to their 40-man roster to protect him from the Rule 5 draft. Medina did not play in a game in 2020 due to the cancellation of the minor league season because of the COVID-19 pandemic. He began the 2021 season with the High–A Hudson Valley Renegades and was promoted to the Double–A Somerset Patriots during the season. In June 2021, Medina was selected to play in the All-Star Futures Game. In 22 contests (21 starts), Medina accumulated a 6–4 record and 3.39 ERA with 133 strikeouts in 106 1/3 innings pitched.

The Yankees optioned Medina to Double–A Somerset to begin the 2022 season. In 17 starts, he registered a 4–3 record and 3.38 ERA with 81 strikeouts.

=== Oakland Athletics ===
On August 1, 2022, the Yankees traded Medina, JP Sears, Ken Waldichuk, and Cooper Bowman to the Oakland Athletics in exchange for Frankie Montas and Lou Trivino. He spent the remainder of the year with the Double-A Midland RockHounds, making seven starts and pitching to a 1–4 record and 11.76 ERA with 26 strikeouts in 20 2/3 innings pitched.

Medina was assigned to the Triple-A Las Vegas Aviators to begin the 2023 season. In three starts, he registered a 3.86 ERA with 11 strikeouts in 9 1/3 innings of work before the Athletics promoted Medina to the major leagues on April 25. He made his major league debut in a start against the Los Angeles Angels the following day. The day after, the Athletics optioned Medina to Las Vegas. He made 23 appearances (17 starts) for Oakland in his rookie campaign, logging a 3–10 record and 5.42 ERA with 106 strikeouts across 109 2/3 innings pitched.

Medina began the 2024 season on the injured list after suffering a Grade 2 medial collateral ligament sprain in spring training. He was activated from the injured list on June 2, 2024. In 8 starts for Oakland, Medina logged a 2–4 record and 5.18 ERA with 32 strikeouts across 40 innings. On July 25, it was announced that Medina would require Tommy John surgery to repair ligament damage in his elbow, ending his season.
