= Luis Barrera =

Dominican baseball player (born 1995)

Guerreros de Oaxaca – No. 18
- Outfielder
- Born: November 15, 1995 (age 30); Tamboril, Dominican Republic
- Bats: Left Throws: Left

MLB debut
- May 19, 2021, for the Oakland Athletics

MLB statistics (through 2022 season)
- Batting average: .235
- Home runs: 1
- Runs batted in: 7
- Stats at Baseball Reference

Teams
- Oakland Athletics (2021–2022)

Luis Rafael Barrera (born November 15, 1995) is a Dominican professional baseball outfielder for the Guerreros de Oaxaca of the Mexican League. He has previously played in Major League Baseball (MLB) for the Oakland Athletics.

== Career ==
=== Oakland Athletics ===
Barrera signed as an international free agent by the Oakland Athletics in 2012 for a $450,000 signing bonus. He 2013 and 2014 with the Dominican Summer League Athletics, hitting .190/.292/.389 with 4 home runs and 20 RBI in 2013 and .130/.216/.130 with 3 RBI in 2014. He spent 2015 with the Arizona League Athletics, hitting .287/.344/.348 with no home runs and 12 RBI. He split the 2016 season between the Vermont Lake Monsters and the Beloit Snappers, combining to hit .310/.361/.428 with 3 home runs and 22 RBI. His 2017 season was split between Beloit and the Stockton Ports, accumulating a .263/.307/.390 batting line with 7 home runs and 38 RBI. He split 2018 between Stockton and the Midland RockHounds, combining to hit .297/.361/.426 with 3 home runs and 64 RBI. He played for the Mesa Solar Sox of the Arizona Fall League during the 2018 offseason.

The Athletics added him to their 40-man roster after the 2018 season. He spent the 2019 season back with Midland, hitting .321/.356/.513/.869 with 4 home runs and 24 RBI over 54 games. Barrera's season ended in late June after suffering multiple subluxation injuries during the year to his right shoulder. On September 8, the Athletics placed him on the 60-day injured list, in order to clear a roster spot.

Barrera did not play in a game in 2020 due to the cancellation of the minor league season because of the COVID-19 pandemic. On May 18, 2021, Barrera was promoted to the major leagues for the first time. He made his MLB debut the next day as a pinch hitter for Ramón Laureano, striking out in his only at-bat. On May 27, Barrera was optioned down to Triple-A.

On April 11, 2022, Barrera was designated for assignment by the Athletics. On April 15, Barrera was removed from the 40–man roster and sent outright to the Triple-A Las Vegas Aviators. On May 9, Barrera was re-selected to the active roster. On May 14, Barrera hit a walk-off home run off of Raisel Iglesias of the Los Angeles Angels. The 3-run shot was also Barrera's first career home run. In 32 games, he hit .234/.294/.338 with 7 RBI and 3 stolen bases. On September 9, Barrera was designated for assignment by the Athletics following the promotion of Conner Capel. He cleared waivers and was sent outright to Triple–A on September 11. Barrera elected free agency following the season on October 10.

=== Acereros de Monclova ===
On December 15, 2022, Barrera signed a minor league deal with the Los Angeles Angels. Barrera was released by the organization on March 24, 2023.

On May 5, 2023, Barrera signed with the Acereros de Monclova of the Mexican League. In 5 games, he batted .191/.227/.191 with 4 hits in 22 plate appearances. Barrera was released on May 24.

=== Tigres de Quintana Roo ===
On May 28, 2023, Barrera signed with the Tigres de Quintana Roo of the Mexican League. In 51 games for Quintana Roo, he hit .313/.385/.438 with 2 home runs, 18 RBI, and 13 stolen bases. Barrera returned to the Tigres in 2024, batting .240/.313/.330 with 24 hits and 8 RBI. He was released on May 23, 2024.

=== Piratas de Campeche ===
On May 27, 2024, Barrera signed with the Piratas de Campeche of the Mexican League. In 15 games for Campeche, Barrera hit .288/.354/.407 with one home run, three RBI, and five stolen bases.

=== Guerreros de Oaxaca ===
On June 27, 2024, Barrera was traded to the Guerreros de Oaxaca of the Mexican League. In 26 appearances for Oaxaca, he batted .376/.438/.551 with two home runs, 15 RBI, and three stolen bases.

In 2025, Barrera returned for a second season with Oaxaca. In 32 games he hit .341/.397/.470 with 2 home runs, 19 RBIs and 11 stolen bases.
