= Ka'ai Tom =

American baseball player (born 1994)

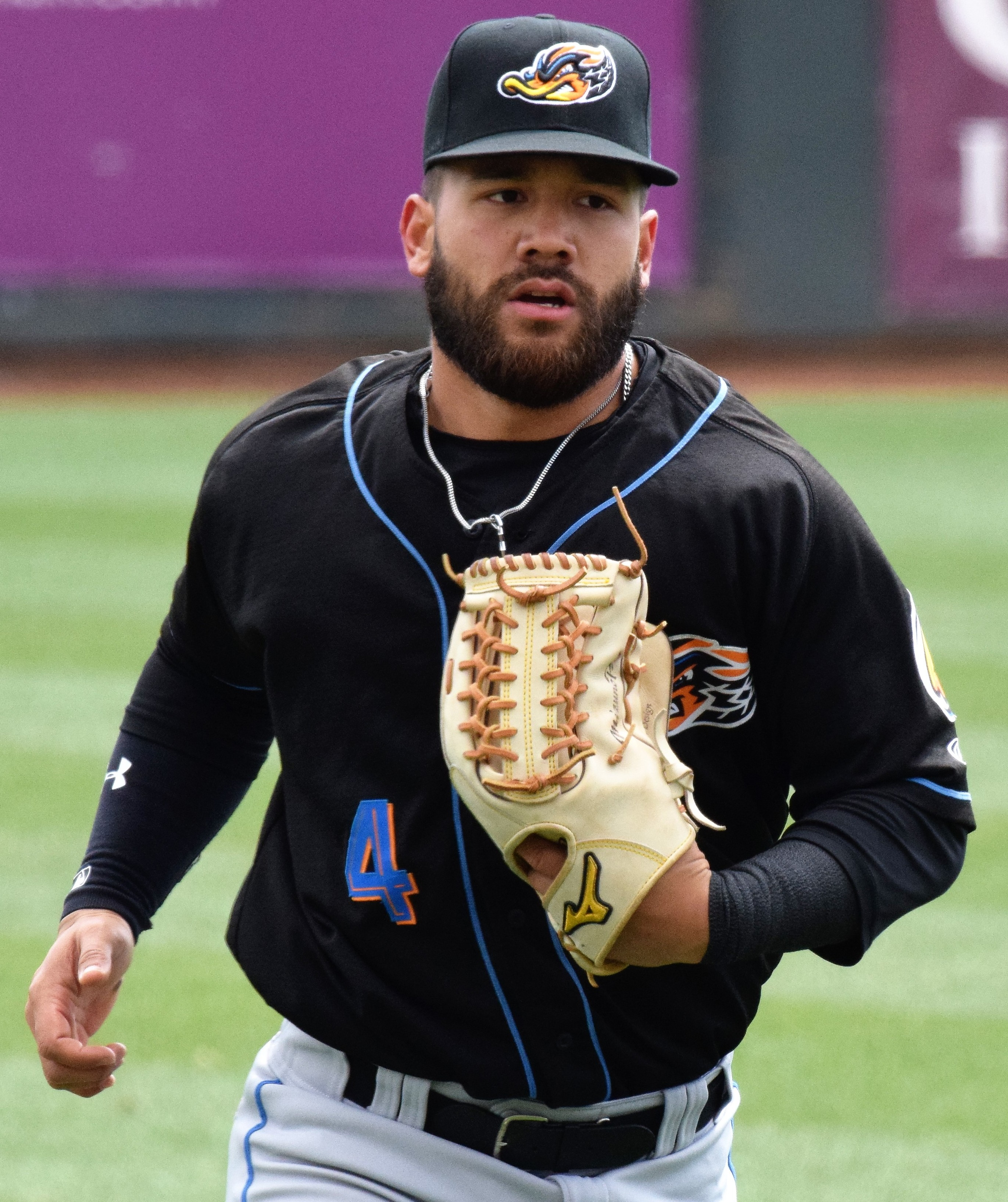
- Tom with the Akron RubberDucks in 2018
- Outfielder
- Born: May 29, 1994 (age 32); Honolulu, Hawaii, U.S.
- Batted: Left Threw: Right

MLB debut
- April 1, 2021, for the Oakland Athletics

Last MLB appearance
- April 29, 2022, for the San Francisco Giants

MLB statistics
- Batting average: .138
- Home runs: 2
- Runs batted in: 12
- Stats at Baseball Reference

Teams
- Oakland Athletics (2021); Pittsburgh Pirates (2021); San Francisco Giants (2022)

Blaze Ka'ai Tom (born May 29, 1994) is an American former professional baseball outfielder. He played in Major League Baseball (MLB) for the Oakland Athletics, Pittsburgh Pirates, and San Francisco Giants. He was drafted in the fifth round of the 2015 MLB draft by the Cleveland Indians. He made his MLB debut in 2021.

== Amateur career ==
Tom graduated from Saint Louis School in Honolulu, Hawaii, where he played baseball and football, in 2012. He was teammates with future Heisman Trophy winner and NFL first round pick Marcus Mariota. After going undrafted in the 2012 Major League Baseball draft, he enrolled at Fort Scott Community College in Fort Scott, Kansas, where he played college baseball. As a freshman in 2013, he batted .387 with 11 home runs and 57 RBIs. After his freshman year, he transferred to the University of Kentucky and joined their baseball team. In 2015, as a junior, he batted .375 with five home runs, 51 RBIs, 15 doubles, and 16 stolen bases.

== Professional career ==
=== Cleveland Indians ===
Tom was selected by the Cleveland Indians in the fifth round of the 2015 Major League Baseball draft. He signed with Cleveland and made his professional debut that same season with the Mahoning Valley Scrappers where he batted .283 with three home runs and 29 RBIs in 66 games. He played in only 28 games in 2016, with the Lake County Captains, due to a left shoulder injury. In 2017, he played with the Lynchburg Hillcats where he slashed .254/.340/.418 with ten home runs, 65 RBIs, and 23 stolen bases in 126 games, and in 2018, he played for the Akron RubberDucks, batting .245/.329/.399 with 12 home runs and 64 RBIs in 121 games. Tom returned to Akron to begin 2019, with whom he was named an Eastern League All-Star as well as the Eastern League Player of the Month for May after hitting .333 with seven home runs in 26 games during the month. He was promoted to the Columbus Clippers in July with whom he finished the year. Over 132 games between Akron and Columbus, Tom hit .290/.380/.532 with 23 home runs and 86 RBIs.

=== Oakland Athletics ===
On December 10, 2020, Tom was selected by the Oakland Athletics in the Rule 5 Draft. In 2021, Tom made Oakland's Opening Day roster after batting .321 over 28 spring training at-bats.

On April 1, 2021, Tom made his major league debut as a pinch runner for Mitch Moreland. On April 4, Tom made his first career pitching appearance, pitching a scoreless ninth inning for the Athletics in a 9–2 loss against the Houston Astros. On April 5, Tom collected his first MLB hit, an RBI single, off of David Price of the Los Angeles Dodgers. On April 19, 2021, after batting .063 for Oakland, Tom was designated for assignment by the Athletics.

=== Pittsburgh Pirates ===
On April 21, 2021, Tom was claimed off waivers by the Pittsburgh Pirates. He was activated on April 27. In 39 games for the Pirates, primarily as a left fielder, Tom hit .152 with two home runs and 11 RBIs.

On August 16, Tom was designated for assignment by the Pirates. On August 20, Tom cleared waivers and was assigned outright to the Indianapolis Indians, with whom he batted .190/.299/.310 over 23 games. On September 20, the Pirates released Tom.

=== San Francisco Giants ===
On September 24, 2021, Tom signed a two-year minor league deal with the San Francisco Giants. He was assigned to the Sacramento River Cats with whom he batted .130/.167/.217 over six games.

Tom was assigned to Triple-A Sacramento to begin the 2022 season. On April 29, 2022, Tom was selected to the active roster after Brandon Belt and Steven Duggar tested positive for COVID-19. Tom went 0-for-1 in his only game before he was returned to Triple-A the following day. Tom appeared in 78 games for the River Cats on the year, slashing .239/.339/.414 with 10 home runs and 47 RBI before he was released on August 7, 2022.

== Personal life ==
His grandfather, Joseph Sr., father, Joseph Jr., and older brothers Jordan and Kainoa each played college baseball.

== See also ==
- Rule 5 draft results
