= J. B. Wendelken =

American baseball player (born 1993)

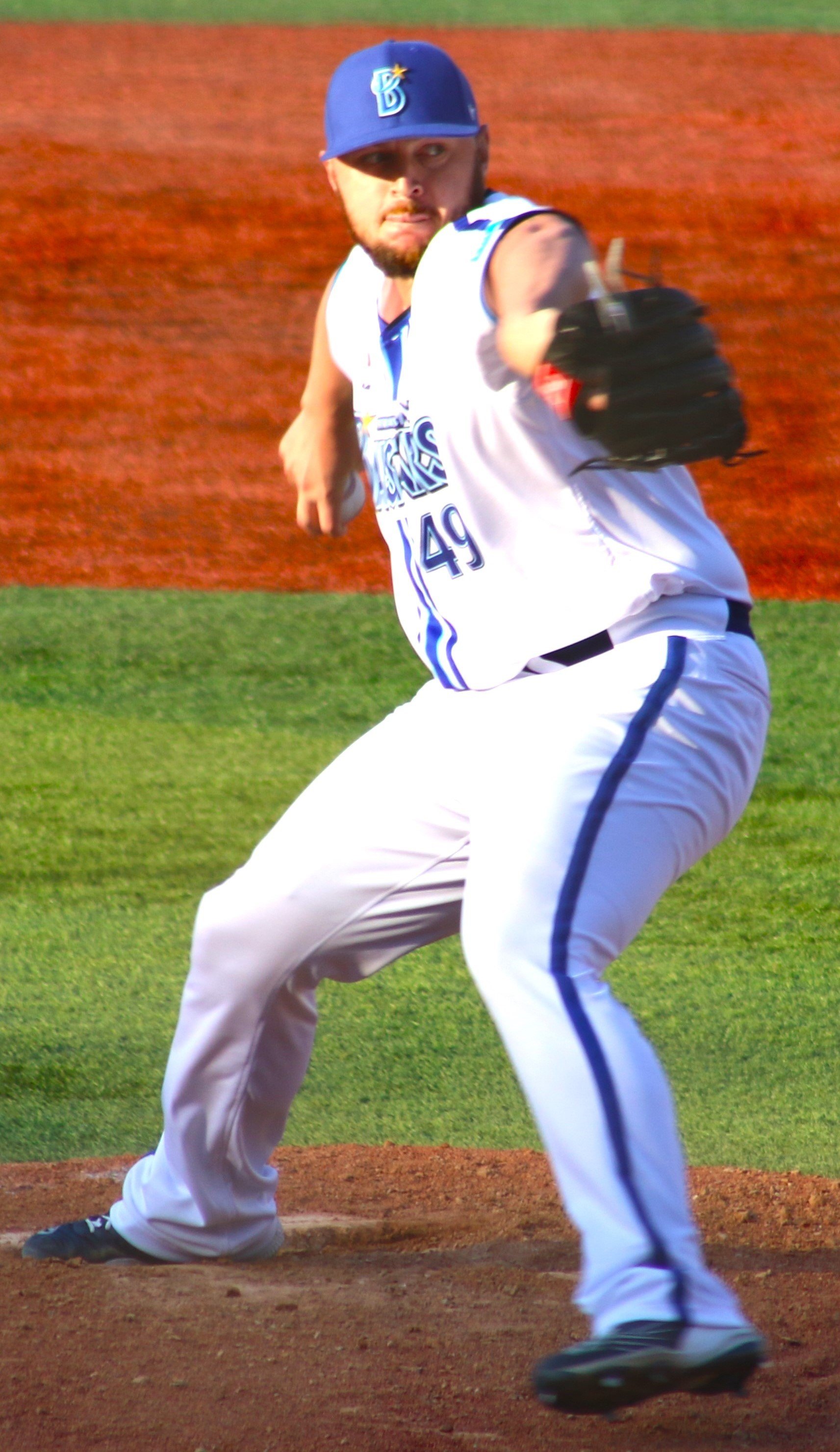
- Wendelken with the Yokohama DeNA BayStars

Free agent
- Pitcher
- Born: March 24, 1993 (age 33); Savannah, Georgia, U.S.
- Bats: Right Throws: Right

Professional debut
- MLB: May 8, 2016, for the Oakland Athletics
- NPB: April 9, 2023, for the Yokohama DeNA BayStars

MLB statistics (through 2022 season)
- Win–loss record: 10–6
- Earned run average: 4.00
- Strikeouts: 151

NPB statistics (through 2024 season)
- Win–loss record: 3–3
- Earned run average: 1.67
- Strikeouts: 78
- Stats at Baseball Reference

Teams
- Oakland Athletics (2016, 2018–2021); Arizona Diamondbacks (2021–2022); Yokohama DeNA BayStars (2023–2024)

Career highlights and awards
- Japan Series champion (2024)
Medals
Men's baseball
Representing United States
WBSC Premier12
Silver medal – second place	2015 Tokyo	Team

Jeffrey Benjamin Wendelken (/wɛnˈdɛlkɛn/ wen-DEL-ken; born March 24, 1993) is an American professional baseball pitcher who is a free agent. He has previously played in Major League Baseball (MLB) for the Oakland Athletics and Arizona Diamondbacks, and in Nippon Professional Baseball (NPB) for the Yokohama DeNA BayStars.

== Career ==
=== Boston Red Sox ===
Wendelken was drafted by the Boston Red Sox in the 13th round, with the 421st overall selection, of the 2012 Major League Baseball draft out of Middle Georgia College. He made his professional debut with the Gulf Coast League Red Sox, posting a 1.27 ERA in 13 appearances. He began the 2013 season with the Single-A Greenville Drive, and recorded a 2.77 ERA in 27 games for the team.

=== Chicago White Sox ===
On July 30, 2013, he was acquired by the Chicago White Sox in a trade that had Wendelken, Avisail García, Frankie Montas, and Cleuluis Rondon going to the White Sox, Jake Peavy and Brayan Villarreal going to the Red Sox, and José Iglesias going to the Detroit Tigers. He finished the year split between the High-A Winston-Salem Dash and the Single-A Kannapolis Intimidators. In 2014, Wendelken remained in Winston-Salem for the entire year, registering a 7–10 record and 5.25 ERA in 27 games. In 2015, he split the season between the Double-A Birmingham Barons and the Triple-A Charlotte Knights, pitching to a 6–2 record and 3.20 ERA between the two clubs. The White Sox added him to their 40-man roster after the 2015 season.

=== Oakland Athletics ===
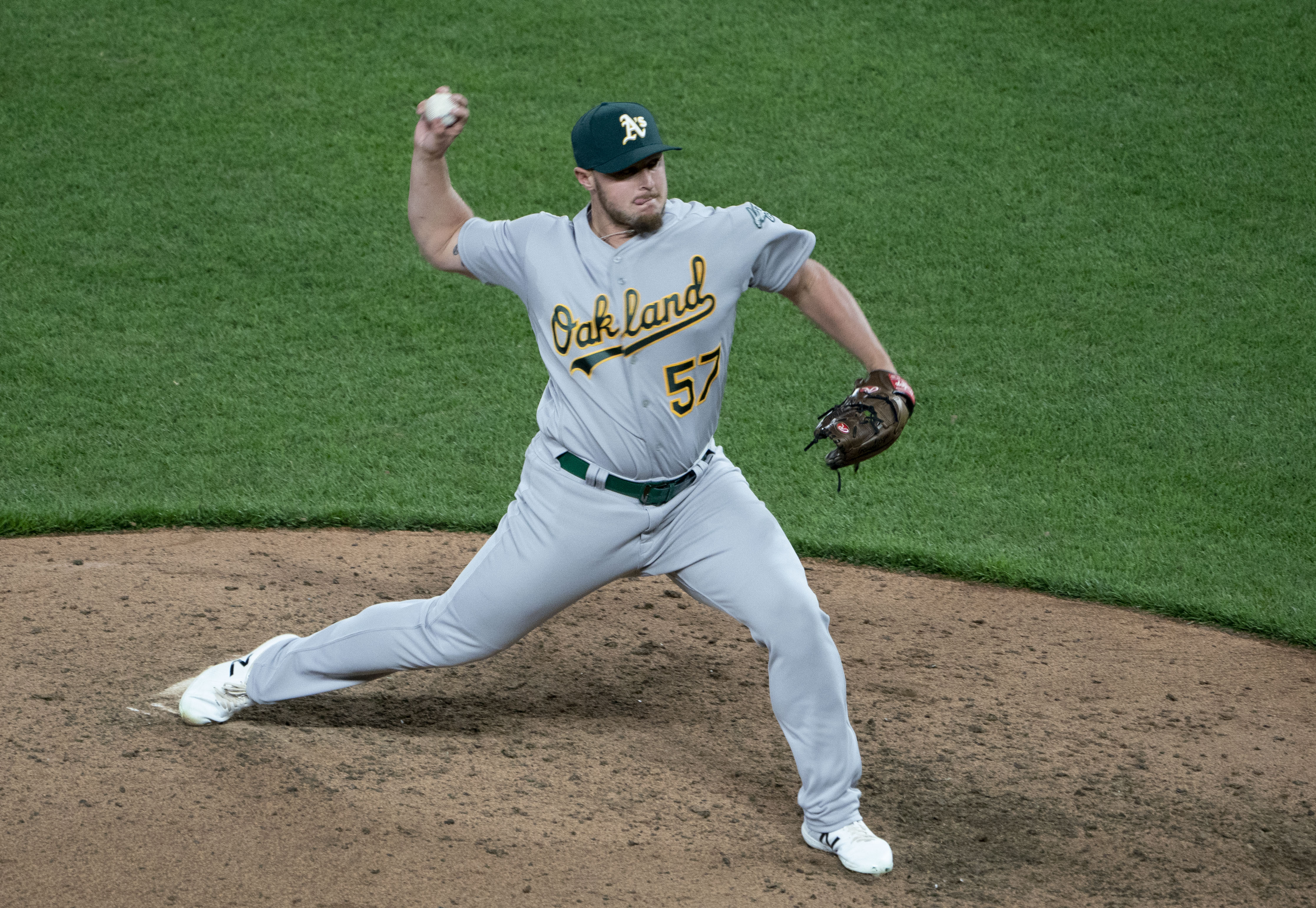
Wendelken with the Oakland Athletics in 2019

On December 9, 2015, Wendelken was traded to the Oakland Athletics, along with Zachary Erwin, for infielder Brett Lawrie.

In 2016, he was assigned to the Triple-A Nashville Sounds to begin the season. On May 8, 2016, he was recalled by the Athletics and made his MLB debut that night. He went back and forth between Nashville and Oakland for the rest of the season before being outrighted to Triple-A on October 6, 2016. Wendelken did not play in a game in 2017 after he underwent Tommy John surgery.

In 2018, he began the season at Triple-A. His contract was purchased by the Athletics on July 14, 2018. In 2019, Wendelken was one of four Athletics pitchers to throw 30 innings with a sub 4.00 ERA, joining Liam Hendriks, Yusmeiro Petit, and Ryan Buchter. In 2020, Wendelken recorded 31 strikeouts in 25 innings and an ERA of 1.80 in 21 games. In 26 appearances for the Athletics is 2021, Wendelken posted a 4.32 ERA with 26 strikeouts. On August 10, 2021, Wendelken was designated for assignment by the Athletics.

=== Arizona Diamondbacks ===
On August 11, 2021, Wendelken was claimed off of waivers by the Arizona Diamondbacks. In 20 appearances down the stretch, he registered a 4.34 ERA with 13 strikeouts and 2 saves in 18 2/3 innings of work.

In 2022, Wendelken made 29 appearances for Arizona, but struggled to a 5.28 ERA with 21 strikeouts in 29 innings pitched. On July 5, 2022, the Diamondbacks designated Wendelken for assignment. He cleared waivers and was sent outright to the Triple-A Reno Aces on July 11. After spending the rest of the season in Reno, Wendelken elected free agency on October 13.

=== Yokohama DeNA BayStars ===
On November 27, 2022, Wendelken signed with the Yokohama DeNA BayStars of Nippon Professional Baseball. He made 61 appearances for Yokohama in 2023, compiling a 2–2 record and 1.66 ERA with 53 strikeouts and 3 saves across 59 2/3 innings pitched.

On November 29, 2023, Wendelken re-signed with the BayStars on a one–year contract. He made 28 appearances for Yokohama in 2024, registering a 1–1 record and 1.71 ERA with 30 strikeouts across 29 1/3 innings pitched. On December 2, 2024, the BayStars announced that Wendelken wouldn’t be returning in 2025, making him a free agent.

=== San Diego Padres ===
On January 14, 2025, Wendelken signed a minor league contract with the San Diego Padres. In 16 appearances split between the rookie-level Arizona Complex League Padres, Double-A San Antonio Missions, and Triple-A El Paso Chihuahuas, he struggled to a cumulative 7.33 ERA and 1-1 record with 25 strikeouts across 23 1/3 innings pitched. Wendelken was released by the Padres organization on August 6.
