= Cole Irvin =

American baseball player (born 1994)

- Irvin with the Oklahoma City Comets in 2026

Free agent
- Pitcher
- Born: January 31, 1994 (age 32); Anaheim, California, U.S.
- Bats: Left Throws: Left

Professional debut
- MLB: May 12, 2019, for the Philadelphia Phillies
- KBO: March 22, 2025, for the Doosan Bears

MLB statistics (through 2026 season)
- Win–loss record: 28–41
- Earned run average: 4.58
- Strikeouts: 439

KBO statistics (through 2025 season)
- Win–loss record: 8–12
- Earned run average: 4.48
- Strikeouts: 128
- Stats at Baseball Reference

Teams
- Philadelphia Phillies (2019–2020); Oakland Athletics (2021–2022); Baltimore Orioles (2023–2024); Minnesota Twins (2024); Doosan Bears (2025); Los Angeles Dodgers (2026)

Cole RJ Irvin (born January 31, 1994) is an American professional baseball pitcher who is a free agent. He has previously played in Major League Baseball (MLB) for the Philadelphia Phillies, Oakland Athletics, Baltimore Orioles, Minnesota Twins, and Los Angeles Dodgers and in the KBO League for the Doosan Bears. Irvin was drafted by the Phillies in the fifth round of the 2016 MLB draft, and made his MLB debut with them in 2019. He pitched for the Athletics from 2021 to 2022.

== Early life and amateur career ==
Irvin is from Yorba Linda, California. He graduated from Servite High School in Anaheim, California. As a junior, he posted a 1.40 ERA. After graduating, he was drafted in the 29th round of the 2012 Major League Baseball draft by the Toronto Blue Jays, but he did not sign. That summer, Irvin played for the Cowlitz Black Bears of the West Coast League, pitching to 5-1 record with a 2.56 ERA.

After not signing with Toronto, Irvin enrolled at the University of Oregon where he played college baseball for the Oregon Ducks. In 2013, as a freshman, he went 12–3 with a 2.48 ERA in 116 innings (second most in school history) while striking out sixty batters, and was named a freshman All-American by Louisville Slugger, Baseball America, Perfect Game, and the NCBWA, along with earning Pac-12 honorable mention. Prior to the 2014 season, Irvin underwent Tommy John surgery and was forced to miss the year. He returned to pitching in 2015, going 2–5 with a 4.10 ERA over 79 innings. In 2016, as a redshirt junior, he was named to the Pac-12 Conference First Team after compiling a 6–4 record with a 3.17 ERA while striking out 93 and walking only 16 over 105 innings.

== Professional career ==
=== Philadelphia Phillies ===
Irvin was drafted by the Philadelphia Phillies in the fifth round (137th overall) of the 2016 Major League Baseball draft, signing for $800,000. After signing, he was assigned to the Williamsport Crosscutters and he spent the whole season there, going 5–1 with a 1.97 ERA in ten games (seven starts). In 2017, he pitched for both the Clearwater Threshers and Reading Fightin Phils, compiling a 9–9 record and 3.39 ERA over 26 games (25 starts) between both teams. With Clearwater, he was named a Florida State League All-Star.

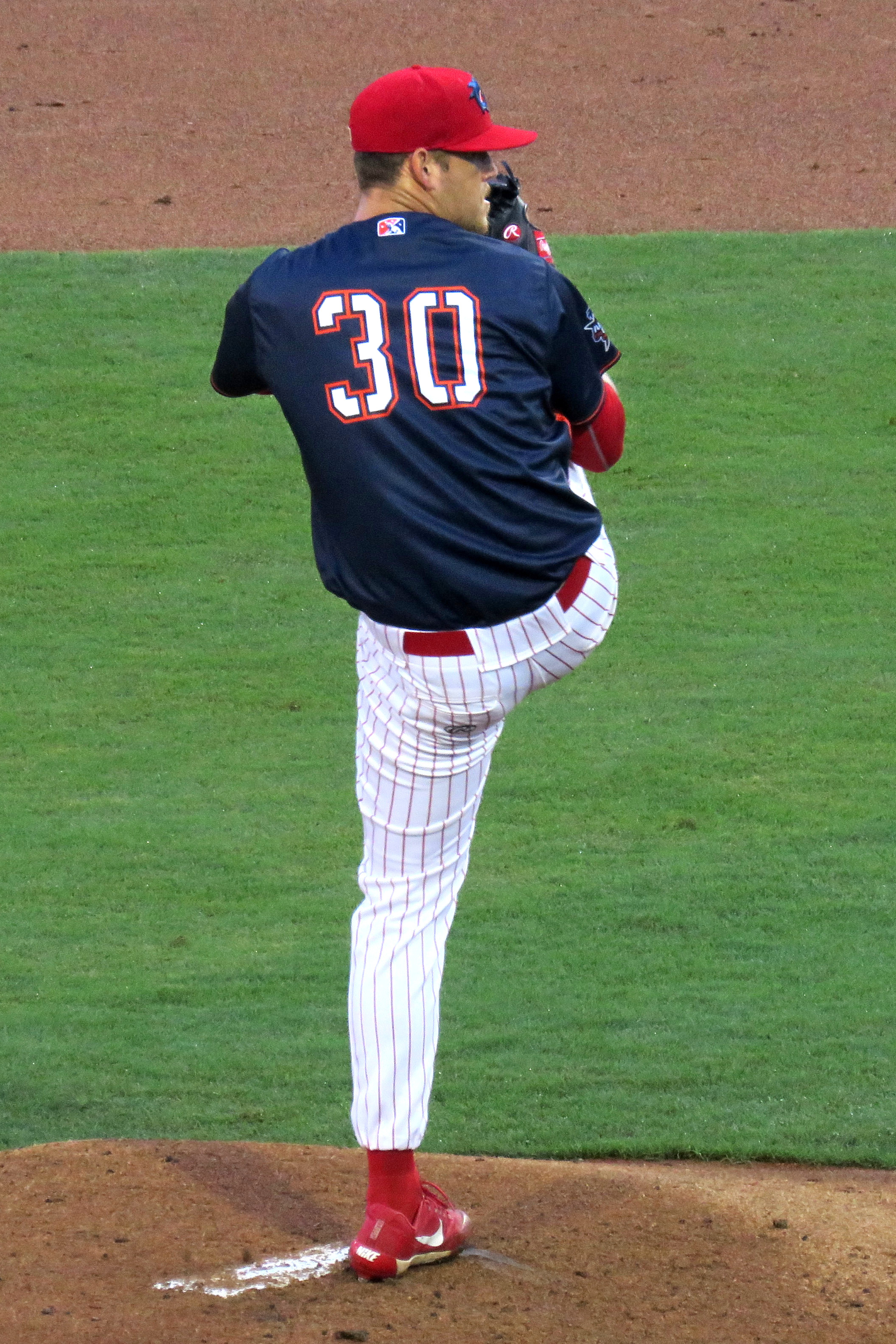
Irvin with the Clearwater Threshers in 2017

In 2018, Irvin played for the Lehigh Valley IronPigs, pitching to a 14–4 record (leading the International League (IL) in wins, and setting a franchise record), leading all Triple–A pitchers in both ERA (2.57) and WHIP (1.054) over 26 games (25 starts). He was named the International League's Most Valuable Pitcher, as well as a mid-season All-Star (starting the All-Star Game) along with being named Pitcher of the Week twice throughout the season.

In 2019 with Lehigh Valley, Irvin was 6-1 with a 3.94 ERA, appearing in 17 games (16 starts), while pitching 93 2/3 innings, and yielding 14 walks. His 1.3 walks/9 innings ratio tied for the second-best in the International League.

Irvin was promoted to the major leagues for the first time on May 12, 2019, and made his big league debut that day. He pitched seven innings, giving up one earned run, and earning his first MLB win. Irvin’s 2019 Phillies stat line included a 2-1 record with one save and a 5.83 ERA while appearing in 16 games (three starts), and pitching 41 2/3 innings. In 2020, Irvin only pitched in three games, notching a 17.18 ERA with four strikeouts over 3 2/3 innings pitched.

=== Oakland Athletics ===
On January 30, 2021, the Phillies traded Irvin to the Oakland Athletics in exchange for cash considerations. In 2021, Irvin posted a 10–15 record with a 4.24 ERA in 178 1/3 innings over 32 starts. He led the American League in losses (15) and hits allowed (195). The following year, he improved his ERA, lowering it to 3.98 over 181 innings.

=== Baltimore Orioles ===
On January 26, 2023, the Athletics traded Irvin to the Baltimore Orioles with right-handed pitcher Kyle Virbitsky in exchange for infielder Darell Hernáiz. Irvin began the season in the O's rotation but struggled and was ultimately sent down to the Triple-A Norfolk Tides. He was brought back up, but as a reliever. He finished 1-4 in 24 games (12 starts) for Baltimore.

During the 2024 season, Irvin was brought up from Triple-A as a reliever, but was added to the starting rotation after the Orioles lost several starters to injuries. In 21 games (14 starts), he compiled a 6–5 record and 4.85 ERA with 66 strikeouts across 94 2/3 innings pitched. Irvin was designated for assignment by the Orioles on July 30, 2024. He cleared waivers and was sent outright to Norfolk on August 2. On August 21, the Orioles selected Irvin's, adding him to their active roster. After four more appearances for the Orioles, Irvin was designated for assignment on September 15.

=== Minnesota Twins ===
On September 16, 2024, Irvin was claimed off waivers by the Minnesota Twins. In 4 games for the Twins, he struggled to a 12.27 ERA with 2 strikeouts over 3 2/3 innings pitched. Irvin was designated for assignment by Minnesota on September 25. He cleared waivers and was sent outright to the Triple-A St. Paul Saints on September 28. Irvin elected free agency on October 1.

=== Doosan Bears ===
On November 15, 2024, Irvin signed a one-year, $1 million contract with the Doosan Bears of the KBO League. He made 28 starts for Doosan in 2025, compiling an 8-12 record and 4.48 ERA with 128 strikeouts across 144 2/3 innings pitched. Irvin became a free agent following the season.

=== Los Angeles Dodgers ===
On February 1, 2026, Irvin signed a minor league contract with the Los Angeles Dodgers and was assigned to the Triple–A Oklahoma City Comets to begin the regular season. On July 31, the Dodgers selected Irvin's contract, adding him to their active roster. He made his team debut that day, pitching six innings against the Boston Red Sox in a long-relief role before being designated for assignment the following day. Irvin cleared waivers and was sent outright back to Oklahoma City on August 3. He made 28 starts for the Comets, with a 12–7 record, 3.33 ERA and 85 strikeouts. He led the Pacific Coast League in both wins and ERA and was second in innings pitched. He elected free agency on November 2.

== Personal ==
Irvin completed his undergraduate degree in sociology in three and a half years. He is the owner of Swirvin Limited, which began as a maker of custom fishing rods but has branched out into apparel and other merchandise carrying the company's logo.
