= Frankie Montas =

Dominican baseball player (born 1993)

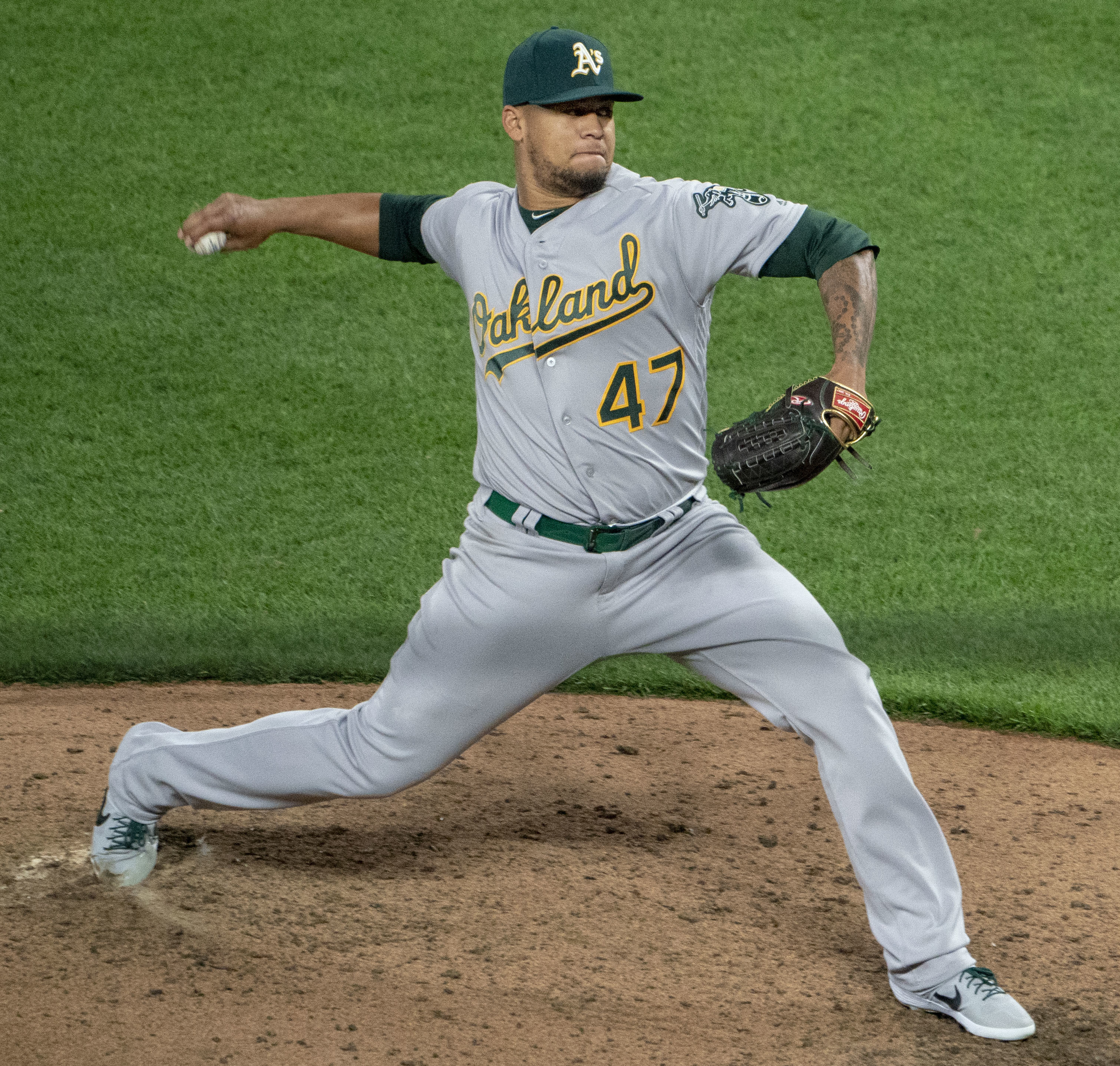
- Montas with the Oakland Athletics in 2019

Free agent
- Pitcher
- Born: March 21, 1993 (age 33); Sainagua, San Cristóbal Province, Dominican Republic
- Bats: Right Throws: Right

MLB debut
- September 2, 2015, for the Chicago White Sox

MLB statistics (through 2025 season)
- Win–loss record: 47–48
- Earned run average: 4.20
- Strikeouts: 792
- Stats at Baseball Reference

Teams
- Chicago White Sox (2015); Oakland Athletics (2017–2022); New York Yankees (2022–2023); Cincinnati Reds (2024); Milwaukee Brewers (2024); New York Mets (2025)

Francelis Montas Luna (born March 21, 1993) is a Dominican professional baseball pitcher who is a free agent. He has previously played in Major League Baseball (MLB) for the Chicago White Sox, Oakland Athletics, New York Yankees, Cincinnati Reds, Milwaukee Brewers, and New York Mets.

Montas signed as an international free agent with the Boston Red Sox in 2009, and was traded to the White Sox in 2013. He made his MLB debut in 2015, and was traded to the Los Angeles Dodgers after the season. After missing time due to injuries, the Dodgers traded Montas to the Athletics during the season. Montas established himself as a major league pitcher for Oakland in 2017, and was traded to the Yankees in 2022. Montas split the 2024 season with the Reds and the Brewers, and signed with the Mets for the 2025 season.

== Career ==
=== Boston Red Sox (2009–2013) ===
Montas signed as an amateur free agent with the Boston Red Sox in 2009, receiving a $75,000 signing bonus. He played in the minor leagues for the Red Sox' organization for the Gulf Coast League Red Sox and Lowell Spinners in 2012, and for the Greenville Drive in 2013.

=== Chicago White Sox (2013–2015) ===
Before the 2013 trade deadline, the Red Sox traded Montas and fellow minor leaguers J. B. Wendelken and Cleuluis Rondon to the Chicago White Sox in a three-team trade, where Jake Peavy went from the White Sox to the Red Sox, Jose Iglesias went from the Red Sox to the Detroit Tigers, Avisaíl García went from the Tigers to the White Sox, and Brayan Villarreal went from the Tigers to the Red Sox. The White Sox assigned Montas to the Kannapolis Intimidators, also in the South Atlantic League.

Montas began the 2014 season with the Winston-Salem Dash of the High-A Carolina League. He was named to appear in the 2014 All-Star Futures Game, but suffered an injury to the meniscus in his knee which required surgery, and withdrew from the game. After rehabilitating, Montas pitched for the Birmingham Barons of the Double-A Southern League. He finished the 2014 season with a combined 5–0 win–loss record and a 1.44 earned run average (ERA).

The White Sox assigned Montas to the Arizona Fall League after the 2014 season. On November 20, 2014, the White Sox added Montas to their 40-man roster to keep him protected from the Rule 5 draft. In his first major league spring training, Montas threw his fastball between 98 and 100 miles per hour (158 and 161 km/h). He returned to Birmingham for the 2015 season, and threw a seven-inning no hitter on June 9. He appeared in the Southern League All-Star Game and the All-Star Futures Game. The White Sox promoted Montas to the major leagues on July 17, 2015, to be their 26th man during that day's doubleheader. He returned to Birmingham the next day without appearing in either game. The White Sox promoted Montas again on September 1, and he made his major league debut as a relief pitcher the next day.

=== Los Angeles Dodgers (2016) ===
On December 16, 2015, Montas, along with Micah Johnson and Trayce Thompson, were traded to the Los Angeles Dodgers as part of a three team trade that sent Todd Frazier to the White Sox and José Peraza, Brandon Dixon and Scott Schebler to the Cincinnati Reds. On February 12, 2016, the Dodgers announced that Montas underwent rib resection surgery and would miss up to four months of the season. He made his first appearance of 2016 with the Tulsa Drillers of the Double-A Texas League on May 22. After a couple of rehab appearances for the Drillers, he was assigned to the Triple-A Oklahoma City Dodgers. He aggravated his rib injury and further testing concluded he had a broken rib and he would miss a month or two of the season recovering.

=== Oakland Athletics (2016–2022) ===
On August 1, 2016, the Dodgers traded Montas, Jharel Cotton, and Grant Holmes to the Oakland Athletics in exchange for Josh Reddick and Rich Hill. After not getting a call to the majors in 2016, he appeared in 23 games for the A's in 2017, allowing 25 runs in 32 innings (7.03 ERA), while compiling a 1–1 record. For the 2018 season, Montas reverted to being a starter, beginning the season with the Triple-A Nashville Sounds. He appeared in 13 games (11 starts) with the A's during the season, compiling a 5–4 record with a 3.88 ERA.

On June 21, 2019, after starting the season 9–2 with a 2.70 ERA in 15 games (all starts), Montas was suspended 80 games without pay for testing positive for a banned substance, ostarine, in violation of MLB's Joint Drug Prevention and Treatment Program. In 2020, Montas began the season as the A's Opening Day starter. Through the season, Montas struggled with command as he recorded a record of 3–5 and an 5.60 ERA in 11 starts.

On February 19, 2021, Montas was placed on the COVID-19 related injured list after testing positive for the virus. He finished the 2021 season with a 13–9 record, a 3.37 ERA and 207 strikeouts in 187 innings, finishing sixth in American League Cy Young Award voting.

On March 22, 2022, Montas signed a $5.025 million contract with the A's, avoiding salary arbitration.

=== New York Yankees (2022–2023) ===
On August 1, 2022, the Athletics traded Montas and Lou Trivino to the New York Yankees for JP Sears, Ken Waldichuk, Luis Medina, and Cooper Bowman. He made his first start with the Yankees on August 7, allowing 6 runs in 3 innings. In 8 starts for the Yankees, Montas posted a 1–3 record, a 6.35 ERA, and 33 strikeouts across 39^{2}/_{3} innings pitched.

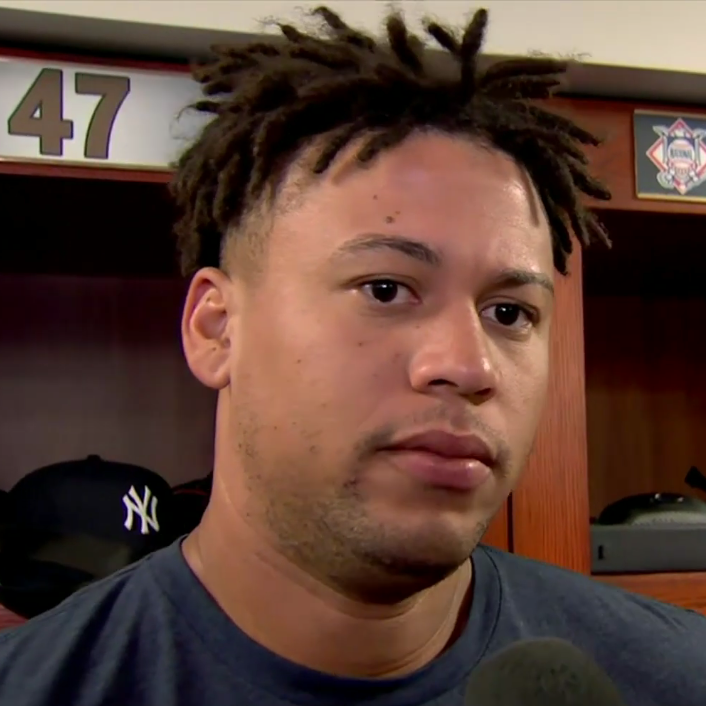
Montas with the Yankees in 2022

On January 14, 2023, it was announced that Montas would likely miss the first month of the season with right shoulder inflammation. On February 15, it was announced that Montas would require arthroscopic surgery on his right shoulder and would miss the majority of the 2023 season. He was activated from the injured list on September 30. He became a free agent following the season.

=== Cincinnati Reds (2024) ===
On January 2, 2024, Montas signed a one-year, $14 million contract with the Cincinnati Reds that also included a $20 million mutual option for 2025. Reds' manager David Bell announced that he would start for the Reds on Opening Day. For the Reds, Montas had a 4–8 record with a 5.01 ERA across 19 games started.

=== Milwaukee Brewers (2024) ===
On July 30, 2024, the Reds traded Montas to the Milwaukee Brewers in exchange for Jakob Junis, Joey Wiemer, and cash considerations. In 11 starts for Milwaukee, he posted a 3–3 record and 4.55 ERA with 70 strikeouts across 57 1/3 innings pitched. On November 4, Montas declined his option for 2025, becoming a free agent.

=== New York Mets (2025) ===
On December 4, 2024, Montas signed a two-year, $34 million contract with the New York Mets including an opt-out after the 2025 season. On February 17, 2025, the Mets announced that Montas had suffered a high-grade lat strain and would be shut down for 6–8 weeks. He was transferred to the 60-day injured list on May 1. On June 24, Montas was activated to make his season debut. On August 12, manager Carlos Mendoza announced that Montas would be moved to the bullpen after struggling to a 6.38 ERA over eight games (seven starts). On August 23, it was announced that Montas would miss the remainder of the season due to a "pretty significant" ulnar collateral ligament injury. On August 28, it was announced that Montas would require UCL surgery, "very likely" a full Tommy John procedure. On November 4, Montas exercised his player option for the 2026 season, but was then designated for assignment by the Mets on November 18 and released the same day.

== Personal life ==
Montas and his wife, Nicholette, have two children as of 2021. He graduated from Dawere International High School in 2024.

== See also ==
- List of Major League Baseball players suspended for performance-enhancing drugs

Awards and achievements
Preceded by Robbie Ray	American League Pitcher of the Month; September 2021	Succeeded by Logan Gilbert
