= Lou Trivino =

American baseball player (born 1991)

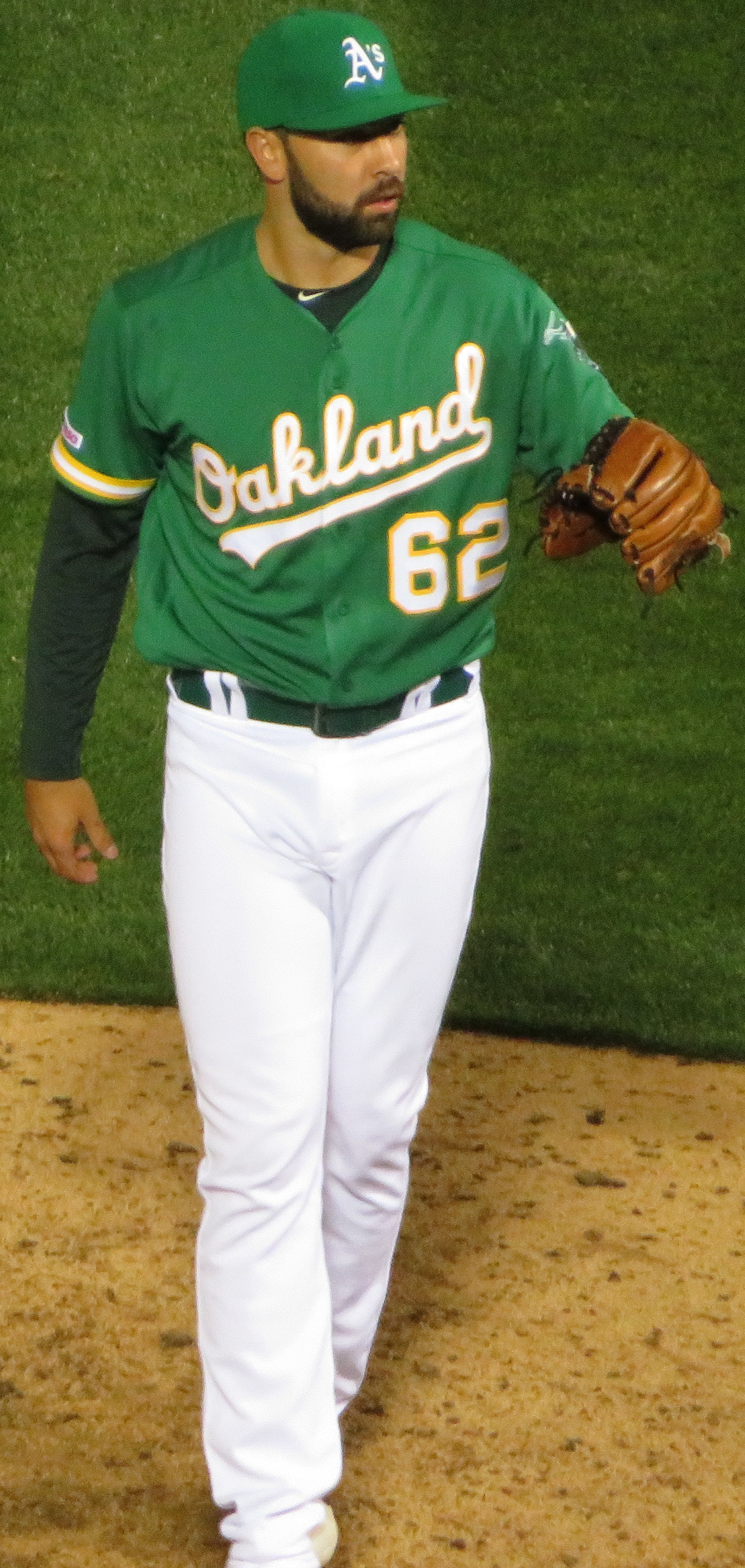
- Trivino with the Oakland Athletics in 2019

Free agent
- Pitcher
- Born: October 1, 1991 (age 35); Green Lane, Pennsylvania, U.S.
- Bats: Right Throws: Right

MLB debut
- April 17, 2018, for the Oakland Athletics

MLB statistics (through 2026 season)
- Win–loss record: 24–27
- Earned run average: 4.07
- Strikeouts: 343
- Stats at Baseball Reference

Teams
- Oakland Athletics (2018–2022); New York Yankees (2022); San Francisco Giants (2025); Los Angeles Dodgers (2025); Philadelphia Phillies (2025); Baltimore Orioles (2026); Philadelphia Phillies (2026)

Louis Albert Trivino III (born October 1, 1991) is an American professional baseball pitcher who is a free agent. He has previously played in Major League Baseball (MLB) for the Oakland Athletics, New York Yankees, San Francisco Giants, Los Angeles Dodgers, Philadelphia Phillies and Baltimore Orioles. He was drafted by Oakland in the 11th round of the 2013 MLB draft, and made his MLB debut with them in 2018.

== Amateur career ==
After graduating from Upper Bucks Christian School where he played for the baseball, basketball and soccer teams, Trivino played college baseball at Slippery Rock University of Pennsylvania. In 2013, his junior year, he went 7–5 with a 1.83 ERA in 13 games (12 starts). After the season, he was drafted by the Oakland Athletics in the 11th round of the 2013 Major League Baseball draft.

== Professional career ==
=== Oakland Athletics ===
Trivino signed and made his professional debut that same year with the Vermont Lake Monsters where he was 3–4 with a 3.12 ERA in 14 games (ten starts). In 2014, he played for the Beloit Snappers where he compiled a 7–11 record and 5.28 ERA in 27 games (26 starts), and in 2015, he pitched for the Stockton Ports, going 10–5 with a 3.91 ERA and 1.27 WHIP in 89 2/3 innings pitched. Trivino spent 2016 with both Stockton and the Midland RockHounds, pitching to a combined 2–4 record and 2.85 ERA in 45 combined relief appearances, and 2017 with Midland and the Nashville Sounds where he was 8–3 with a 3.03 ERA in 68 1/3 innings pitched between the two teams. The Athletics added him to their 40-man roster after the 2017 season.

Trivino began the 2018 season with Nashville, but was promoted to Oakland on April 17, making his MLB debut that night against the Chicago White Sox. He allowed two hits and a walk but no runs in one scoreless inning, picking up his first MLB strikeout against Omar Narváez. The next day, also against the White Sox, he earned his first MLB win pitching three shutout innings in extra innings and allowing two hits and striking out four. For the season, Trivino appeared in 69 games, collecting an ERA of 2.92 in 74 innings with a record of 8–3 and four saves. In the 2018 AL Wild Card Game, Trivino pitched three shutout innings against the New York Yankees, while only allowing one hit and one walk.

In 2019, despite a strong start, Trivino was temporarily demoted from his role as the primary setup man after a stretch of four appearances in which he gave up nine runs (eight earned) in 4 2/3 innings, causing his ERA to balloon from 2.42 to 4.40. Trivino did not find the same success as the previous season, ending with an ERA of 5.25 in 61 games. In 2020, he recorded an ERA of 3.86 in 20 games during the pandemic shortened season. In the postseason, he pitched 2/3 of an inning in the Wild Card Series and two innings in the Division Series, allowing only one run (on a solo homer by Carlos Correa of the Houston Astros in the first game of the division series).

Trivino began the 2021 season as part of a closer-by-committee arrangement before taking over the role full time. For July, he was selected as the Reliever of the Month Award in the American League. He lost the closer role in August after a rough stretch and was replaced by Sergio Romo. He finished the season with a 7–8 record, 3.18 ERA and 22 saves in 73 2/3 innings over 71 games. In 2022, he pitched in 39 games with a 1–6 record, 6.47 ERA and 10 saves in 32 innings.

=== New York Yankees ===
On August 1, 2022, Athletics traded Trivino and Frankie Montas to the New York Yankees in exchange for JP Sears, Ken Waldichuk, Luis Medina, and Cooper Bowman. He made 25 appearances for the Yankees down the stretch, posting a 1.66 ERA with 22 strikeouts in 21 2/3 innings pitched. He also pitched 3 2/3 scoreless innings for the Yankees in the postseason.

On November 18, Trivino signed a one-year, $4.1 million contract, avoiding arbitration. However, he suffered a right elbow strain prior to the start of the 2023 season, and was transferred to the 60-day injured list on April 29, 2023. Following a setback in his recovery, it was later announced on May 2 that he required Tommy John surgery and would miss the remainder of the season. He was non-tendered and became a free agent on November 17.

On February 14, 2024, Trivino re-signed with the Yankees on a one-year contract that included a club option for 2025. After returning from surgery, he made 11 appearances split between the Double-A Somerset Patriots and Triple-A Scranton/Wilkes-Barre RailRiders, in which he accumulated a 4.91 ERA with 11 strikeouts. On November 3, the Yankees declined the team option on his contract, making him a free agent.

=== San Francisco Giants ===
On February 6, 2025, Trivino signed a minor league contract with the San Francisco Giants. On March 25, the Giants selected his contract after he made the team's Opening Day roster. In 11 appearances for San Francisco, he logged a 1–0 record and 5.84 ERA with 11 strikeouts across 12 1/3 innings pitched. Trivino was designated for assignment by the Giants on May 5. He cleared waivers and elected free agency on May 9.

=== Los Angeles Dodgers ===
On May 10, 2025, Trivino signed a minor league contract with the Los Angeles Dodgers. After initially being assigned to the Triple-A Oklahoma City Comets, he was added to the 40-man roster and recalled to the Dodgers on May 18. Trivino pitched in 26 1/3 innings over 26 games, recording a 3.76 ERA and 18 strikeouts. Trivino was designated for assignment by the Dodgers on July 21. He was released by the team after clearing waivers on July 27.

=== Philadelphia Phillies ===
On August 4, 2025, Trivino signed a minor league contract with the Philadelphia Phillies. He made six scoreless appearances for the Triple-A Lehigh Valley IronPigs, recording seven strikeouts across seven innings of work. On August 26, the Phillies selected Trivino's contract, adding him to their active roster. He made 10 appearances for Philadelphia, recording an 0–1 record and 2.00 ERA with eight strikeouts over nine innings of work.

On February 7, 2026, Trivino re-signed with the Phillies organization on a minor league contract. He made 10 appearances for Triple-A Lehigh Valley, compiling a 3–0 record and 2.77 ERA with 20 strikeouts over 13 innings of work. On May 1, Trivino triggered the opt-out clause in his contract and was released by Philadelphia.

=== Baltimore Orioles ===
On May 4, 2026, Trivino signed a major league contract with the Baltimore Orioles. He made two appearances for Baltimore, allowing six runs on six hits with three strikeouts across three innings of work. On May 10, Trivino was designated for assignment by the Orioles. He elected free agency after clearing waivers on May 12.

=== Philadelphia Phillies (second stint) ===
On May 16, 2026, Trivino signed a minor league contract with the Philadelphia Phillies. He made 22 appearances for the Triple-A Lehigh Valley IronPigs, compiling a 3–0 record and 1.27 ERA with 34 strikeouts and three saves across 28 1/3 innings pitched. On June 30, the Phillies selected Trivino's contract, adding him to their active roster. In three appearances for the team, he allowed four runs on four hits across three innings of work. Trivino was designated for assignment by Philadelphia on August 3. He elected free agency after clearing waivers on August 5, but re–signed with Philadelphia on a minor league contract two days later. He elected free agency on November 2.

== See also ==
- List of baseball players who underwent Tommy John surgery
