= 2022 Oakland Athletics season =

2022 Oakland Athletics
- League: American League
- Division: West
- Ballpark: Oakland Coliseum
- City: Oakland, California
- Record: 60–102 (.370)
- Divisional place: 5th
- Owners: John Fisher
- President: Dave Kaval
- General managers: David Forst
- Managers: Mark Kotsay
- Television: NBC Sports California (Glen Kuiper, Dallas Braden)
- Radio: KNEW; Oakland Athletics Radio Network (Ken Korach, Vince Cotroneo)

The 2022 Oakland Athletics season was the 122nd season for the Oakland Athletics franchise, all as members of the American League. It was their 55th season in Oakland, which surpassed the amount of seasons they played in their original home of Philadelphia (54 seasons). On November 1, 2021, Bob Melvin was hired away from the A's by the San Diego Padres for their manager position. Mark Kotsay was named as Melvin's successor on December 21, 2021.

On December 2, 2021, Commissioner of Baseball Rob Manfred announced a lockout of players, following expiration of the collective bargaining agreement (CBA) between the league and the Major League Baseball Players Association (MLBPA). On March 10, 2022, MLB and the MLBPA agreed to a new collective bargaining agreement, thus ending the lockout. Opening Day was played on April 8. Although MLB previously announced that several series would be cancelled due to the lockout, the agreement provides for a 162-game season, with originally canceled games to be made up via doubleheaders.

The A’s were gutted ahead of the season after trading away key players such as Matt Olson, Matt Chapman, Chris Bassitt, and Sean Manaea. Owing to this, they failed to improve on their 86–76 record from the previous season. On September 7, they were the first American League team to be eliminated from playoff contention.

The A's also had a poor offensive season as well, batting only .216 as a team and finishing at or near the bottom of the AL in every other offensive category as well. The pitching staff faltered as well, posting a team 4.52 ERA and finishing near the bottom of the AL in most pitching categories.

== Offseason ==
=== Lockout ===
The expiration of the league's collective bargaining agreement (CBA) with the Major League Baseball Players Association occurred on December 1, 2021 with no new agreement in place. As a result, the team owners voted unanimously to lockout the players stopping all free agency and trades.

The parties came to an agreement on a new CBA on March 10, 2022.

=== Rule changes ===
Pursuant to the new CBA, several new rules were instituted for the 2022 season. The National League will adopt the designated hitter full-time, a draft lottery will be implemented, the postseason will expand from ten teams to twelve, and advertising patches will appear on player uniforms and helmets for the first time.

=== Transactions ===
March 13	Acquired RHPs J.T. Ginn and Adam Oller from the New York Mets for RHP Chris Bassitt.
March 14	Acquired C Shea Langeliers, OF Cristian Pache, and RHPs Ryan Cusick and Joey Estes from the Atlanta Braves for 1B Matt Olson.
March 16	Acquired 3B Kevin Smith, RHP Gunnar Hoglund, and LHPs Zach Logue and Kirby Snead from the Toronto Blue Jays for 3B Matt Chapman.
April 3	Acquired RHP Adrián Martínez and infielder Euribiel Angeles from the San Diego Padres for LHP Sean Manaea and RHP Aaron Holiday.

== Season standings ==
=== American League West ===
AL West
Team	W	L	Pct.	GB	Home	Road
Houston Astros	106	56	.654	—	55‍–‍26	51‍–‍30
Seattle Mariners	90	72	.556	16	46‍–‍35	44‍–‍37
Los Angeles Angels	73	89	.451	33	40‍–‍41	33‍–‍48
Texas Rangers	68	94	.420	38	34‍–‍47	34‍–‍47
Oakland Athletics	60	102	.370	46	29‍–‍51	31‍–‍51

=== American League Wild Card ===
Division leaders
Team	W	L	Pct.
Houston Astros	106	56	.654
New York Yankees	99	63	.611
Cleveland Guardians	92	70	.568

Wild Card teams (Top 3 teams qualify for postseason)
Team	W	L	Pct.	GB
Toronto Blue Jays	92	70	.568	+6
Seattle Mariners	90	72	.556	+4
Tampa Bay Rays	86	76	.531	—
Baltimore Orioles	83	79	.512	3
Chicago White Sox	81	81	.500	5
Minnesota Twins	78	84	.481	8
Boston Red Sox	78	84	.481	8
Los Angeles Angels	73	89	.451	13
Texas Rangers	68	94	.420	18
Detroit Tigers	66	96	.407	20
Kansas City Royals	65	97	.401	21
Oakland Athletics	60	102	.370	26

=== Record against opponents ===
2022 American League record Source: MLB Standings Grid – 2022
Team	BAL	BOS	CWS	CLE	DET	HOU	KC	LAA	MIN	NYY	OAK	SEA	TB	TEX	TOR	NL
Baltimore	—	9–10	5–2	3–3	1–5	4–3	4–3	6–1	3–4	7–12	3–4	2–4	9–10	6–0	9–10	12–8
Boston	10–9	—	2–4	5–2	5–1	4–2	3–4	4–3	3–4	6–13	5–1	6–1	7–12	6–1	3–16	9–11
Chicago	2–5	4–2	—	7–12	12–7	3–4	9–10	3–4	9–10	3–4	5–2	4–2	4–2	3–4	2–4	11–9
Cleveland	3–3	2–5	12–7	—	10–9	3–4	12–7	3–4	13–6	1–5	6–1	1–6	4–2	5–1	5–2	12–8
Detroit	5–1	1–5	7–12	9–10	—	0–7	10–9	3–3	8–11	1–5	2–5	1–6	2–5	4–3	2–5	11–9
Houston	3–4	2–4	4–3	4–3	7–0	—	5–2	13–6	6–0	5–2	12–7	12–7	5–1	14–5	2–4	12–8
Kansas City	3–4	4–3	10–9	7–12	9–10	2–5	—	3–3	7–12	1–6	3–3	2–4	3–4	2–4	2–5	7–13
Los Angeles	1–6	3–4	4–3	4–3	3–3	6–13	3–3	—	4–2	2–4	12–7	10–9	2–5	9–10	3–4	7–13
Minnesota	4–3	4–3	10–9	6–13	11–8	0–6	12–7	2–4	—	2–5	5–1	4–3	4–2	2–5	4–3	8–12
New York	12–7	13–6	4–3	5–1	5–1	2–5	6–1	4–2	5–2	—	5–2	2–4	11–8	4–3	11–8	10–10
Oakland	4–3	1–5	2–5	1–6	5–2	7–12	3–3	7–12	1–5	2–5	—	8–11	3–4	8–11	3–3	5–15
Seattle	4–2	1–6	2–4	6–1	6–1	7–12	4–2	9–10	3–4	4–2	11–8	—	2–5	14–5	5–2	12–8
Tampa Bay	10–9	12–7	2–4	2–4	5–2	1–5	4–3	5–2	2–4	8–11	4–3	5–2	—	4–3	10–9	12–8
Texas	0–6	1–6	4–3	1–5	3–4	5–14	4–2	10–9	5–2	3–4	11–8	5–14	3–4	—	2–4	11–9
Toronto	10–9	16–3	4–2	2–5	5–2	4–2	5–2	4–3	3–4	8–11	3–3	2–5	9–10	4–2	—	13–7

Updated with the results of all games through October 5, 2022.

== Game log ==
2022 Game Log
Total: 60–102 (Home: 29–51; Away: 31–51)
April: 10–11 (Home: 4–5; Away: 6–6)

#	Date	Opponent	Score	Win	Loss	Save	Stadium	Attendance	Record	Streak
1	April 8	@ Phillies	5–9	Nola (1–0)	**Montas** (0–1)	—	Citizens Bank Park	44,232	0–1	L1
2	April 9	@ Phillies	2–4	Gibson (1–0)	**Irvin** (0–1)	Knebel (1)	Citizens Bank Park	41,622	0–2	L2
3	April 10	@ Phillies	4–1	**Jefferies** (1–0)	Falter (0–1)	—	Citizens Bank Park	33,507	1–2	W1
4	April 11	@ Rays	13–2	**Blackburn** (1–0)	Patiño (0–1)	—	Tropicana Field	9,139	2–2	W2
5	April 12	@ Rays	8–9 (10)	Thompson (1–0)	**Trivino** (0–1)	—	Tropicana Field	7,588	2–3	L1
6	April 13	@ Rays	4–2	**Montas** (1–1)	McClanahan (0–1)	**Trivino** (1)	Tropicana Field	8,954	3–3	W1
7	April 14	@ Rays	6–3	**Irvin** (1–1)	Fleming (1–1)	**Jiménez** (1)	Tropicana Field	8,287	4–3	W2
8	April 15	@ Blue Jays	1–4	Cimber (3–0)	**Jefferies** (1–1)	Romano (5)	Rogers Centre	35,415	4–4	L1
9	April 16	@ Blue Jays	7–5	**Jiménez** (1–0)	Merryweather (0–2)	**Trivino** (2)	Rogers Centre	32,330	5–4	W1
10	April 17	@ Blue Jays	3–4	Manoah (2–0)	**Oller** (0–1)	Romano (6)	Rogers Centre	27,490	5–5	L1
11	April 18	Orioles	5–1	**Montas** (2–1)	Krehbiel (1–1)	—	**Oakland Coliseum**	17,503	6–5	W1
12	April 19	Orioles	2–1	**Logue** (1–0)	Baumann (1–1)	**Jackson** (1)	**Oakland Coliseum**	3,748	7–5	W2
13	April 20	Orioles	0–1	Lyles (1–1)	**Jefferies** (1–2)	López (2)	**Oakland Coliseum**	2,703	7–6	L1
14	April 21	Orioles	6–4	**Blackburn** (2–0)	Wells (0–2)	**Jiménez** (2)	**Oakland Coliseum**	4,429	8–6	W1
15	April 22	Rangers	1–8	Otto (1–0)	**Oller** (0–2)	—	**Oakland Coliseum**	7,012	8–7	L1
16	April 23	Rangers	0–2	Burke (1–0)	**Montas** (2–2)	Bush (1)	**Oakland Coliseum**	9,120	8–8	L2
17	April 24	Rangers	2–0	**Irvin** (2–1)	Howard (0–1)	**Jiménez** (3)	**Oakland Coliseum**	11,083	9–8	W1
18	April 26	@ Giants	2–8	Rodón (3–0)	**Jefferies** (1–3)	—	Oracle Park	32,898	9–9	L1
19	April 27	@ Giants	1–0	**Blackburn** (3–0)	Long (0–1)	**Jiménez** (4)	Oracle Park	32,014	10–9	W1
20	April 29	Guardians	8–9	Stephan (2–0)	**Acevedo** (0–1)	Clase (3)	**Oakland Coliseum**	12,910	10–10	L1
21	April 30	Guardians	1–3	Sandlin (1–1)	**Jiménez** (1–1)	Clase (4)	**Oakland Coliseum**	6,707	10–11	L2

May: 10–21 (Home: 3–14; Away: 7–7)

#	Date	Opponent	Score	Win	Loss	Save	Stadium	Attendance	Record	Streak
22	May 1	Guardians	3–7	McKenzie (1–2)	**Kaprielian** (0–1)	–	**Oakland Coliseum**	14,945	10–12	L3
23	May 2	Rays	1–6	Rasmussen (2–1)	**Jefferies** (1–4)	–	**Oakland Coliseum**	2,488	10–13	L4
24	May 3	Rays	7–10 (10)	Kittredge (2–0)	**Trivino** (0–2)	–	**Oakland Coliseum**	2,815	10–14	L5
25	May 4	Rays	0–3	Feyereisen (2–0)	**Jackson** (0–1)	Kittredge (4)	**Oakland Coliseum**	4,838	10–15	L6
26	May 6	@ Twins	1–2	Winder (2–0)	**Logue** (1–1)	Pagán (3)	Target Field	17,509	10–16	L7
27	May 7	@ Twins	0–1	Jax (2–0)	**Kaprielian** (0–2)	Durán (2)	Target Field	22,272	10–17	L8
28	May 8	@ Twins	3–4	Stashak (3–0)	**Jefferies** (1–5)	Pagán (4)	Target Field	14,295	10–18	L9
29	May 9	@ Tigers	2–0	**Blackburn** (4–0)	Pineda (1–2)	**Jiménez** (5)	Comerica Park	12,674	11–18	W1
30	May 10 (1)	Tigers	0–6	Skubal (2–2)	**Montas** (2–3)	–	Comerica Park	13,844	11–19	L1
31	May 10 (2)	@ Tigers	4–1	**Martínez** (1–0)	Faedo (0–1)	–	Comerica Park	13,844	12–19	W1
32	May 11	@ Tigers	9–0	**Logue** (2–1)	Wentz (0–1)	–	Comerica Park	15,375	13–19	W2
33	May 12	@ Tigers	5–3	**Puk** (1–0)	Fulmer (1–2)	**Jiménez** (6)	Comerica Park	17,565	14–19	W3
34	May 13	Angels	0–2	Silseth (1–0)	**Jefferies** (1–6)	Iglesias (8)	**Oakland Coliseum**	13,992	14–20	L1
35	May 14 (1)	Angels	4–3	**Trivino** (1–1)	Iglesias (1–2)	–	**Oakland Coliseum**	12,719	15–20	W1
36	May 14 (2)	Angels	1–9	Lorenzen (4–2)	**Oller** (0–3)	–	**Oakland Coliseum**	7,737	15–21	L1
37	May 15	Angels	1–4	Sandoval (2–1)	**Montas** (2–4)	Herget (1)	**Oakland Coliseum**	14,668	15–22	L2
38	May 16	Twins	1–3	Cano (1–0)	**Logue** (2–2)	Duffey (1)	**Oakland Coliseum**	3,138	15–23	L3
39	May 17	Twins	5–2	**Jackson** (1–1)	Winder (2–2)	**Jiménez** (7)	**Oakland Coliseum**	3,640	16–23	W1
40	May 18	Twins	4–14	Gray (1–1)	**Jefferies** (1–7)	–	**Oakland Coliseum**	7,106	16–24	L1
41	May 20	@ Angels	4–2	**Moll** (1–0)	Silseth (1–1)	**Jiménez** (8)	Angel Stadium	32,422	17–24	W1
42	May 21	@ Angels	3–5	Lorenzen (5–2)	**Kolarek** (0–1)	Iglesias (9)	Angel Stadium	39,045	17–25	L1
43	May 22	@ Angels	1–4	Sandoval (3–1)	**Irvin** (2–2)	Iglesias (10)	Angel Stadium	40,042	17–26	L2
44	May 23	@ Mariners	6–7	Gonzales (3–4)	**Logue** (2–3)	Sewald (2)	T-Mobile Park	14,415	17–27	L3
45	May 24	@ Mariners	7–5	**Moll** (2–0)	Misiewicz (0–1)	**Jiménez** (9)	T-Mobile Park	14,797	18–27	W1
46	May 25	@ Mariners	4–2	**Blackburn** (5–0)	Ray (4–5)	**Jiménez** (10)	T-Mobile Park	15,856	19–27	W2
47	May 26	Rangers	1–4	Bush (2–1)	**Trivino** (1–3)	Barlow (8)	**Oakland Coliseum**	3,203	19–28	L1
48	May 27	Rangers	5–8	Moore (2–0)	**Jiménez** (1–2)	Santana (1)	**Oakland Coliseum**	5,010	19–29	L2
49	May 28	Rangers	4–11	Hearn (3–3)	**Logue** (2–4)	–	**Oakland Coliseum**	6,502	19–30	L3
50	May 29	Rangers	6–5	**Jiménez** (2–2)	Martin (0–4)	–	**Oakland Coliseum**	8,342	20–30	W1
51	May 30	Astros	1–5	Valdez (5–2)	**Blackburn** (5–1)	–	**Oakland Coliseum**	8,753	20–31	L1
52	May 31	Astros	1–3	Montero (3–0)	**Montas** (2–5)	Pressly (9)	**Oakland Coliseum**	3,469	20–32	L2

June: 5–21 (Home: 1–9; Away: 4–12)

#	Date	Opponent	Score	Win	Loss	Save	Stadium	Attendance	Record	Streak
53	June 1	Astros	4–5	Abreu (3–0)	**Jiménez** (2–3)	Pressly (10)	**Oakland Coliseum**	5,189	20–33	L3
54	June 3	Red Sox	2–7	Eovaldi (3–2)	**Kaprielian** (0–3)	–	**Oakland Coliseum**	17,852	20–34	L4
55	June 4	Red Sox	0–8	Pivetta (5–4)	**Blackburn** (5–2)	–	**Oakland Coliseum**	14,796	20–35	L5
56	June 5	Red Sox	2–5	Hill (2–3)	**Montas** (2–6)	–	**Oakland Coliseum**	12,084	20–36	L6
57	June 7	@ Braves	2–3	Wright (6–3)	**Trivino** (1–4)	Jansen (15)	Truist Park	33,981	20–37	L7
58	June 8	@ Braves	2–13	Anderson (5–3)	**Koenig** (0–1)	–	Truist Park	42,075	20–38	L8
59	June 9	@ Guardians	4–8	De Los Santos (1–0)	**Trivino** (1–5)	–	Progressive Field	12,995	20–39	L9
60	June 10	@ Guardians	2–3	Gose (2–0)	**Jiménez** (2–4)	–	Progressive Field	21,311	20–40	L10
61	June 11	@ Guardians	10–5	**Montas** (3–6)	Morgan (2–2)	–	Progressive Field	22,674	21–40	W1
62	June 12	@ Guardians	3–6	Quantrill (4–3)	**Irvin** (2–3)	Clase (11)	Progressive Field	17,775	21–41	L1
63	June 14	@ Red Sox	1–6	Pivetta (6–5)	**Koenig** (0–2)	–	Fenway Park	32,617	21–42	L2
64	June 15	@ Red Sox	1–10	Winckowski (1–1)	**Kaprielian** (0–4)	–	Fenway Park	31,877	21–43	L3
65	June 16	@ Red Sox	4–3	**Blackburn** (6–2)	Hill (2–4)	**Jiménez** (11)	Fenway Park	30,779	22–43	W1
66	June 17	Royals	1–5	Lynch (3–6)	**Montas** (3–7)	–	**Oakland Coliseum**	8,772	22–44	L1
67	June 18	Royals	0–2	Keller (2–8)	**Irvin** (2–4)	Barlow (8)	**Oakland Coliseum**	10,936	22–45	L2
68	June 19	Royals	4–0	**Koenig** (1–2)	Singer (3–2)	–	**Oakland Coliseum**	14,341	23–45	W1
69	June 21	Mariners	2–8	Gonzales (4–7)	**Kaprielian** (0–5)	–	**Oakland Coliseum**	4,733	23–46	L1
70	June 22	Mariners	0–9	Kirby (2–2)	**Blackburn** (6–3)	–	**Oakland Coliseum**	5,414	23–47	L2
71	June 23	Mariners	1–2	Castillo (4–1)	**Jackson** (1–2)	Sewald (5)	**Oakland Coliseum**	8,215	23–48	L3
72	June 24	@ Royals	1–3	Greinke (1–4)	**Irvin** (2–5)	Barlow (9)	Kauffman Stadium	25,077	23–49	L4
73	June 25	@ Royals	9–7	**Jackson** (2–2)	Keller (2–9)	**Trivino** (3)	Kauffman Stadium	13,543	24–49	W1
74	June 26	@ Royals	5–3	**Moll** (3–0)	Singer (3–3)	**Trivino** (4)	Kauffman Stadium	24,820	25–49	W2
75	June 27	@ Yankees	5–9	Abreu (1–0)	**Puk** (1–1)	–	Yankee Stadium	33,168	25–50	L1
76	June 28	@ Yankees	1–2	Sears (3–0)	**Montas** (3–8)	Holmes (13)	Yankee Stadium	38,051	25–51	L2
77	June 29	@ Yankees	3–5	Taillon (9–1)	**Irvin** (2–6)	Holmes (14)	Yankee Stadium	39,647	25–52	L3
78	June 30	@ Mariners	6–8	Gilbert (9–3)	**Martínez** (1–1)	Sewald (8)	T-Mobile Park	20,860	25–53	L4

July: 14–12 (Home: 9–5; Away: 5–7)

#	Date	Opponent	Score	Win	Loss	Save	Stadium	Attendance	Record	Streak
79	July 1	@ Mariners	3–1	**Kaprielian** (1–5)	Gonzales (4–9)	**Trivino** (5)	T-Mobile Park	27,589	26–53	W1
80	July 2	@ Mariners	1–2	Castillo (6–1)	**Trivino** (1–6)	–	T-Mobile Park	23,907	26–54	L1
81	July 3	@ Mariners	1–2	Ray (7–6)	**Montas** (3–9)	Sewald (9)	T-Mobile Park	23,333	26–55	L2
82	July 4	Blue Jays	5–1	**Irvin** (3–6)	Manoah (9–3)	–	**Oakland Coliseum**	24,403	27–55	W1
83	July 5	Blue Jays	5–3	**Martínez** (2–1)	Kikuchi (3–5)	**Trivino** (6)	**Oakland Coliseum**	4,846	28–55	W2
84	July 6	Blue Jays	1–2	Cimber (8–2)	**Acevedo** (1–2)	Romano (18)	**Oakland Coliseum**	6,330	28–56	L1
85	July 8	Astros	3–8	Urquidy (8–3)	**Blackburn** (6–4)	–	**Oakland Coliseum**	6,012	28–57	L2
86	July 9	Astros	3–2	**Logue** (3–4)	Valdez (8–4)	**Trivino** (7)	**Oakland Coliseum**	10,058	29–57	W1
87	July 10	Astros	1–6	Odorizzi (4–2)	**Irvin** (3–7)	–	**Oakland Coliseum**	10,195	29–58	L1
88	July 11	@ Rangers	8–10	Howard (1–1)	**Martínez** (2–2)	Martin (3)	Globe Life Field	20,660	29–59	L2
89	July 12	@ Rangers	14–7 (12)	**Snead** (1–0)	Santana (3–4)	–	Globe Life Field	17,485	30–59	W1
90	July 13	@ Rangers	2–5	Gray (6–4)	**Blackburn** (6–5)	Richards (1)	Globe Life Field	22,394	30–60	L1
91	July 15	@ Astros	5–1	**Irvin** (4–7)	Urquidy (8–4)	–	Minute Maid Park	39,434	31–60	W1
92	July 16	@ Astros	0–5	Verlander (12–3)	**Koenig** (1–3)	–	Minute Maid Park	39,125	31–61	L1
93	July 17	@ Astros	4–3	**Puk** (2–1)	Montero (3–1)	**Trivino** (8)	Minute Maid Park	34,534	32–61	W1
–	July 19	**92nd All-Star Game in Los Angeles, CA**								
94	July 21 (1)	Tigers	2–7	Skubal (7–8)	**Logue** (3–5)	–	**Oakland Coliseum**	7,282	32–62	L1
95	July 21 (2)	Tigers	5–0	**Acevedo** (2–2)	Hill (1–2)	–	**Oakland Coliseum**	7,282	33–62	W1
96	July 22	Rangers	5–4	**Irvin** (5–7)	Howard (1–2)	**Puk** (1)	**Oakland Coliseum**	6,620	34–62	W2
97	July 23	Rangers	3–1	**Acevedo** (3–2)	Santana (3–6)	**Jackson** (2)	**Oakland Coliseum**	10,190	35–62	W3
98	July 24	Rangers	8–11	Pérez (8–2)	**Blackburn** (6–6)	–	**Oakland Coliseum**	9,835	35–63	L1
99	July 25	Astros	7–5	**Oller** (1–3)	Odorizzi (4–3)	**Trivino** (9)	**Oakland Coliseum**	4,105	36–63	W1
100	July 26	Astros	5–3	**Montas** (4–9)	García (8–6)	**Trivino** (10)	**Oakland Coliseum**	5,130	37–63	W2
101	July 27	Astros	4–2	**Irvin** (6–7)	Javier (6–6)	**Puk** (2)	**Oakland Coliseum**	9,367	38–63	W3
102	July 29	@ White Sox	7–3	**Kaprielian** (2–5)	Lynn (1–4)	–	Guaranteed Rate Field	28,503	39–63	W4
103	July 30	@ White Sox	2–3	Hendriks (2–3)	**Jackson** (2–3)	–	Guaranteed Rate Field	28,142	39–64	L1
104	July 31	@ White Sox	1–4	Cease (11–4)	**Oller** (1–4)	Hendriks (20)	Guaranteed Rate Field	30,028	39–65	L2

August: 10–17 (Home: 5–10; Away: 5–7)

#	Date	Opponent	Score	Win	Loss	Save	Stadium	Attendance	Record	Streak
105	August 2	@ Angels	1–3	Suárez (3–4)	**Irvin** (6–8)	Quijada (2)	Angel Stadium	22,920	39–66	L3
106	August 3	@ Angels	3–1	**Kaprielian** (3–5)	Ohtani (9–7)	**Jackson** (3)	Angel Stadium	25,190	40–66	W1
107	August 4	@ Angels	8–7	**Blackburn** (7–6)	Junk (1–1)	**Puk** (3)	Angel Stadium	23,849	41–66	W2
108	August 6	Giants	3–7	Rodón (10–6)	**Oller** (1–5)	–	**Oakland Coliseum**	40,065	41–67	L1
109	August 7	Giants	4–6	Webb (10–5)	**Martínez** (2–3)	Doval (14)	**Oakland Coliseum**	31,605	41–68	L2
110	August 8	Angels	0–1	Suárez (4–4)	**Irvin** (6–9)	Tepera (2)	**Oakland Coliseum**	5,440	41–69	L3
111	August 9	Angels	1–5	Ohtani (10–7)	**Kaprielian** (3–6)	–	**Oakland Coliseum**	9,351	41–70	L4
112	August 10	Angels	4–5 (12)	Barría (2–2)	**Pruitt** (0–1)	–	**Oakland Coliseum**	8,268	41–71	L5
113	August 12	@ Astros	5–7	García (9–8)	**Moll** (2–1)	Neris (2)	Minute Maid Park	31,230	41–72	L6
114	August 13	@ Astros	0–8	McCullers Jr. (1–0)	**Logue** (3–6)	–	Minute Maid Park	34,078	41–73	L7
115	August 14	@ Astros	3–6	Javier (7–8)	**Irvin** (6–10)	Pressly (23)	Minute Maid Park	38,906	41–74	L8
116	August 15	@ Rangers	1–2	Otto (5–8)	**Kaprielian** (3–7)	Hernández (4)	Globe Life Field	13,141	41–75	L9
117	August 16	@ Rangers	5–1	**Sears** (4–0)	Arihara (0–1)	–	Globe Life Field	15,260	42–75	W1
118	August 17	@ Rangers	7–2	**Oller** (2–5)	Ragans (0–2)	–	Globe Life Field	14,846	43–75	W2
119	August 18	@ Rangers	3–10	Dunning (3–6)	**Logue** (3–7)	–	Globe Life Field	16,495	43–76	L1
120	August 19	Mariners	2–10	Gonzales (8–12)	**Irvin** (6–11)	–	**Oakland Coliseum**	16,912	43–77	L2
121	August 20	Mariners	4–3 (10)	**Jiménez** (3–4)	Castillo (7–2)	–	**Oakland Coliseum**	9,626	44–77	W1
122	August 21	Mariners	5–3	**Sears** (5–0)	Castillo (5–5)	**Pruitt** (1)	**Oakland Coliseum**	9,314	45–77	W1
123	August 22	Marlins	0–3	Cabrera (4–1)	**Oller** (2–6)	Scott (18)	**Oakland Coliseum**	2,630	45–78	L1
124	August 23	Marlins	3–5	López (8–8)	**Logue** (3–8)	Scott (19)	**Oakland Coliseum**	4,028	45–79	L2
125	August 24	Marlins	3–2 (10)	**Puk** (3–1)	Bleier (2–2)	–	**Oakland Coliseum**	3,901	46–79	W1
126	August 25	Yankees	4–13	Taillon (12–4)	**Kaprielian** (3–8)	–	**Oakland Coliseum**	10,876	46–80	L1
127	August 26	Yankees	2–3	Cole (10–6)	**Sears** (5–1)	Peralta (3)	**Oakland Coliseum**	16,821	46–81	L2
128	August 27	Yankees	3–2 (11)	**Payamps** (3–3)	Trivino (2–8)	–	**Oakland Coliseum**	36,529	47–81	W1
129	August 28	Yankees	4–1	**Martínez** (3–3)	Schmidt (5–3)	**Puk** (4)	**Oakland Coliseum**	29,498	48–81	W2
130	August 30	@ Nationals	10–6	**Irvin** (7–11)	Fedde (5–9)	–	Nationals Park	26,321	49–81	W3
131	August 31	@ Nationals	1–5	Sánchez (1–5)	**Kaprielian** (3–9)	–	Nationals Park	26,416	49–82	L1

September: 7–19 (Home: 4–8; Away: 3–11)

#	Date	Opponent	Score	Win	Loss	Save	Stadium	Attendance	Record	Streak
132	September 1	@ Nationals	5–7 (10)	Harvey (1–0)	**Ruiz** (0–1)	–	Nationals Park	26,877	49–83	L2
133	September 2	@ Orioles	2–5	Tate (3–3)	**Acevedo** (3–3)	–	Camden Yards	13,558	49–84	L3
134	September 3	@ Orioles	1–8	Akin (3–1)	**Oller** (2–7)	–	Camden Yards	30,853	49–85	L4
135	September 4	@ Orioles	5–0	**Martínez** (4–3)	Watkins (4–6)	–	Camden Yards	19,883	50–85	W1
136	September 6	Braves	9–10	Chavez (3–1)	**Payamps** (3–4)	Jansen (32)	**Oakland Coliseum**	6,062	50–86	L1
137	September 7	Braves	3–7	Strider (10–4)	**Waldichuk** (0–1)	–	**Oakland Coliseum**	5,332	50–87	L2
138	September 8	White Sox	2–14	Cease (14–6)	**Sears** (5–2)	–	**Oakland Coliseum**	4,591	50–88	L3
139	September 9	White Sox	3–5	Bummer (2–1)	**Puk** (3–2)	Hendriks (32)	**Oakland Coliseum**	11,494	50–89	L4
140	September 10	White Sox	2–10	Lynn (6–5)	**Martínez** (4–4)	–	**Oakland Coliseum**	11,107	50–90	L5
141	September 11	White Sox	10–3	**Irvin** (8–11)	Cueto (7–8)	–	**Oakland Coliseum**	11,701	51–90	W1
142	September 13	@ Rangers	7–8	Burke (7–3)	**Payamps** (3–5)	–	Globe Life Field	14,925	51–91	L1
143	September 14	@ Rangers	8–7	**Cyr** (1–0)	Leclerc (0–3)	**Acevedo** (1)	Globe Life Field	25,700	52–91	W1
144	September 15	@ Astros	2–5	Martinez (1–1)	**Payamps** (3–6)	Montero (13)	Minute Maid Park	26,543	52–92	L1
145	September 16	@ Astros	0–5	Verlander (17–3)	**Martínez** (4–5)	–	Minute Maid Park	33,850	52–93	L2
146	September 17	@ Astros	8–5	**Irvin** (9–11)	Urquidy (13–7)	**Acevedo** (2)	Minute Maid Park	33,419	53–93	W1
147	September 18	@ Astros	2–11	Valdez (16–5)	**Waldichuk** (0–2)	–	Minute Maid Park	30,375	53–94	L1
148	September 20	Mariners	4–1	**Sears** (6–2)	Castillo (7–6)	**Acevedo** (3)	**Oakland Coliseum**	4,251	54–94	W1
149	September 21	Mariners	2–1	**Kaprielian** (4–9)	Swanson (2–1)	**Acevedo** (4)	**Oakland Coliseum**	4,030	55–94	W1
150	September 22	Mariners	5–9	Boyd (2–0)	**Snead** (1–1)	–	**Oakland Coliseum**	4,696	55–95	L1
151	September 23	Mets	2–9	Bassitt (15–8)	**Irvin** (9–12)	–	**Oakland Coliseum**	18,107	55–96	L2
152	September 24	Mets	10–4	**Waldichuk** (1–2)	deGrom (5–3)	–	**Oakland Coliseum**	16,041	56–96	W1
153	September 25	Mets	4–13	Scherzer (11–4)	**Sears** (6–3)	–	**Oakland Coliseum**	13,942	56–97	L1
154	September 27	@ Angels	3–4	Tepera (5–3)	**Puk** (3–3)	Herget (7)	Angel Stadium	19,374	56–98	L2
155	September 28	@ Angels	1–4	Lorenzen (8–6)	**Martínez** (4–6)	Herget (8)	Angel Stadium	23,573	56–99	L3
156	September 29	@ Angels	2–4	Ohtani (15–8)	**Irvin** (9–13)	Tepera (5)	Angel Stadium	31,293	56–100	L4
157	September 30	@ Mariners	1–2	Brash (4–4)	**Acevedo** (3–4)	–	T-Mobile Park	44,754	56–101	L5

October: 4–1 (Home: 3–0; Away: 1–1)

#	Date	Opponent	Score	Win	Loss	Save	Stadium	Attendance	Record	Streak
158	October 1	@ Mariners	1–5	Castillo (8–6)	**Oller** (2–8)	–	T-Mobile Park	42,512	56–102	L6
159	October 2	@ Mariners	10–3	**Kaprielian** (5–9)	Ray (12–12)	–	T-Mobile Park	42,465	57–102	W1
160	October 3	Angels	5–4 (10)	**Acevedo** (4–4)	Weiss (0–1)	–	**Oakland Coliseum**	6,978	58–102	W2
161	October 4	Angels	2–1 (10)	**Puk** (4–3)	Tepera (5–4)	–	**Oakland Coliseum**	8,189	59–102	W3
162	October 5	Angels	3–2	**Waldichuk** (2–2)	Ohtani (15–9)	**Snead** (1)	**Oakland Coliseum**	11,232	60–102	W4

Legend: = Win = Loss = Postponement
Bold = Athletics team member

== Roster ==
2022 Oakland Athletics
Roster
Pitchers: 68 Domingo Acevedo; 58 Paul Blackburn; 38 Ryan Castellani; 57 Tyler Cyr; 46 Justin Grimm; 19 Cole Irvin; 61 Zach Jackson; 66 Daulton Jefferies; 56 Dany Jiménez; 32 James Kaprielian; 46 Jared Koenig; 57 Adam Kolarek; 71 Jake Lemoine; 67 Zach Logue; 44 Parker Markel; 55 Adrián Martínez; 44 David McKay; 60 Sam Moll; 47 Frankie Montas; 36 Adam Oller; 30 Joel Payamps; 29 Austin Pruitt; 33 A. J. Puk; 63 Norge Ruiz; 38 JP Sears; 40 Sam Selman; 54 Kirby Snead; 50 Domingo Tapia; 62 Lou Trivino; 64 Ken Waldichuk; 39 Collin Wiles	Catchers: 30 Austin Allen; 23 Shea Langeliers; 12 Sean Murphy; 21 Stephen Vogt; Infielders: 2 Nick Allen; 17 Elvis Andrus; 23 Christian Bethancourt; 77 Jonah Bride; 15 Seth Brown; 44 Ernie Clement; 4 Matt Davidson; 75 Jordan Díaz; 76 Dermis García; 5 Tony Kemp; 49 Christian Lopes; 8 Jed Lowrie; 31 Vimael Machín; 49 David MacKinnon; 53 Nate Mondou; 26 Sheldon Neuse; 18 Chad Pinder; 1 Kevin Smith	Outfielders: 13 Luis Barrera; 11 Skye Bolt; 72 Conner Capel; 37 Drew Jackson; 22 Ramón Laureano; 79 Mickey McDonald; 28 Billy McKinney; 20 Cristian Pache; 10 Chad Pinder; 25 Stephen Piscotty; 37 Cal Stevenson; 48 Cody Thomas	Manager: 7 Mark Kotsay; Coaches: 18 Mike Aldrete (quality control); 16 Brad Ausmus (bench); 51 Darren Bush (third base/run prevention); 90 Wilkin Castillo (bullpen catcher); 41 Chris Cron (assistant hitting); 14 Scott Emerson (pitching); 52 Tommy Everidge (hitting); 91 Dustin Hughes (bullpen catcher); 59 Marcus Jensen (bullpen); 3 Eric Martins (first base)

== Statistics ==
Updated through October 5.

=== Batting ===
Stats in bold are the team leaders.

Note: G = Games played; AB = At bats; R = Runs; H = Hits; 2B = Doubles; 3B = Triples; HR = Home runs; RBI = Runs batted in; BB = Walks; SO = Strikeouts; SB = Stolen bases; Avg. = Batting average; OBP = On-base percentage; SLG = Slugging; OPS = On base + slugging

Player	G	AB	R	H	2B	3B	HR	RBI	BB	SO	SB	AVG	OBP	SLG	OPS
Sean Murphy	148	**537**	**67**	**134**	**37**	2	18	66	**56**	124	1	**.250**	**.332**	.426	**.759**
Seth Brown	150	500	55	115	26	**3**	**25**	**73**	51	**146**	**11**	.230	.308	**.444**	.749
Tony Kemp	147	497	61	117	24	2	7	46	45	69	**11**	.235	.307	.334	.641
Chad Pinder	111	361	38	85	18	0	12	42	14	118	2	.235	.263	.385	.648
Elvis Andrus	106	354	41	84	24	0	8	30	30	62	7	.237	.301	.373	.673
Ramón Laureano	94	346	49	73	18	0	13	34	25	104	**11**	.211	.287	.376	.663
Nick Allen	100	299	31	62	13	0	4	19	19	64	3	.207	.256	.291	.547
Cristian Pache	91	241	18	40	5	2	3	18	15	70	2	.166	.218	.241	.459
Sheldon Neuse	70	233	21	53	4	2	3	21	17	69	6	.227	.286	.300	.586
Vimael Machín	73	223	26	49	12	0	1	13	25	47	1	.220	.300	.287	.587
Christian Bethancourt	56	169	23	42	11	0	4	19	10	41	4	.249	.298	.385	.683
Stephen Vogt	70	168	18	27	4	1	7	23	17	46	1	.161	.241	.321	.562
Jed Lowrie	50	167	14	30	5	0	3	16	15	39	1	.180	.245	.263	.508
Jonah Bride	58	162	17	33	4	0	1	6	19	32	1	.204	.301	.247	.548
Shea Langeliers	40	142	14	31	10	1	6	22	9	53	0	.218	.261	.430	.691
Kevin Smith	47	139	9	25	9	1	2	13	7	42	4	.180	.216	.302	.518
Stephen Piscotty	42	126	12	24	4	0	5	14	9	48	2	.190	.252	.341	.593
Dermis García	39	116	13	24	6	0	5	20	8	55	0	.207	.264	.388	.652
Skye Bolt	42	106	10	21	2	0	4	13	7	30	5	.198	.259	.330	.589
Luis Barrera	32	77	3	18	5	0	1	7	6	17	3	.234	.294	.338	.632
Cal Stevenson	23	60	5	10	3	0	0	1	8	23	1	.167	.261	.217	.478
Billy McKinney	23	52	3	5	1	0	1	4	4	16	0	.096	.158	.173	.331
Jordan Díaz	15	49	3	13	3	0	0	1	2	7	0	.265	.294	.327	.621
Conner Capel	13	35	6	13	0	1	2	9	4	8	1	.371	.425	.600	1.025
Cody Thomas	10	30	1	8	0	0	0	0	2	12	0	.267	.313	.267	.579
Matt Davidson	8	24	2	4	0	0	1	2	0	10	0	.167	.167	.292	.459
Ernie Clement	6	18	1	1	1	0	0	0	0	2	0	.056	.056	.111	.167
Austin Allen	5	14	1	1	0	0	0	0	1	9	0	.071	.188	.071	.259
Christian Lopes	4	9	0	0	0	0	0	0	1	5	0	.000	.100	.000	.100
Mickey McDonald	4	4	0	0	0	0	0	0	2	3	0	.000	.333	.000	.333
Drew Jackson	3	3	0	0	0	0	0	0	0	1	0	.000	.000	.000	.000
Nate Mondou	1	2	0	0	0	0	0	0	1	1	0	.000	.333	.000	.333
**Team totals**	**162**	**5314**	**568**	**1147**	**249**	**15**	**137**	**537**	**433**	**1389**	**78**	**.216**	**.281**	**.346**	**.626**
**Rank in AL**	—	**15**	**14**	**15**	**9**	**10**	**13**	**14**	**13**	**8**	**9**	**15**	**15**	**14**	**15**

=== Pitching ===
Stats in bold are the team leaders.

Note: W = Wins; L = Losses; ERA = Earned run average; G = Games pitched; GS = Games started; SV = Saves; IP = Innings pitched; H = Hits allowed; R = Runs allowed; ER = Earned runs allowed; BB = Walks allowed; K = Strikeouts

Player	W	L	ERA	G	GS	SV	IP	H	R	ER	BB	K
Cole Irvin	**9**	**13**	**3.98**	30	**30**	0	**181.0**	**174**	**87**	**80**	36	**128**
James Kaprielian	5	9	4.23	26	26	0	134.0	121	68	63	**59**	98
Paul Blackburn	7	6	4.28	21	21	0	111.1	110	53	53	30	89
Frankie Montas	4	9	3.18	19	19	0	104.2	91	44	37	28	109
Adam Oller	2	8	6.30	19	14	0	74.1	82	55	52	39	46
Domingo Acevedo	4	4	3.33	**70**	0	4	67.2	50	26	25	17	58
A. J. Puk	4	3	3.12	62	0	4	66.1	53	27	23	23	76
Adrián Martínez	4	6	6.24	12	12	0	57.2	69	42	40	19	53
Zach Logue	3	8	6.79	14	10	0	57.0	68	44	43	20	42
Austin Pruitt	0	1	4.23	39	1	1	55.1	48	29	26	9	38
JP Sears	3	3	4.69	10	9	0	48.0	53	26	25	18	36
Zach Jackson	2	3	3.00	54	0	3	48.0	28	18	16	33	67
Kirby Snead	1	1	5.84	46	0	1	44.2	56	31	29	22	35
Sam Moll	2	1	2.91	53	0	0	43.1	33	16	14	22	46
Daulton Jefferies	1	7	5.72	8	8	0	39.1	46	26	25	8	28
Jared Koenig	1	3	5.72	10	5	0	39.1	40	25	25	15	22
Ken Waldichuk	2	2	4.93	7	7	0	34.2	32	19	19	10	33
Dany Jiménez	3	4	3.41	34	0	**11**	34.1	23	16	13	18	34
Lou Trivino	1	6	6.47	39	0	10	32.0	46	25	23	14	45
Norge Ruiz	0	1	7.11	14	0	0	19.0	30	16	15	7	18
Sam Selman	0	0	4.91	16	0	0	18.1	16	10	10	5	18
Adam Kolarek	0	1	4.58	15	0	0	17.2	20	9	9	8	9
Domingo Tapia	0	0	8.47	11	0	0	17.0	25	16	16	14	12
Jacob Lemoine	0	0	7.71	9	0	0	16.1	18	15	14	7	13
Justin Grimm	0	0	4.11	15	0	0	15.1	18	8	7	7	11
Tyler Cyr	1	0	2.08	11	0	0	13.0	9	3	3	5	16
Joel Payamps	1	3	3.46	12	0	0	13.0	14	5	5	0	8
Collin Wiles	0	0	4.66	4	0	0	9.2	11	6	5	2	9
Sheldon Neuse	0	0	0.00	3	0	0	3.2	1	0	0	0	0
Parker Markel	0	0	0.00	3	0	0	3.0	1	0	0	5	3
Ryan Castellani	0	0	0.00	3	0	0	2.2	2	1	0	0	1
David McKay	0	0	3.38	1	0	0	2.2	4	1	1	0	2
Christian Bethancourt	0	0	0.00	1	0	0	1.0	0	0	0	1	0
Chad Pinder	0	0	27.00	1	0	0	1.0	2	3	3	2	0
**Team totals**	**60**	**102**	**4.52**	**162**	**162**	**34**	**1426.1**	**1394**	**770**	**717**	**503**	**1203**
**Rank in AL**	**15**	**1**	**13**	—	—	**13**	**13**	**12**	**13**	**13**	**9**	**13**

== Farm system ==
Level	Team	League	Division	Manager	Record	through
AAA	Las Vegas Aviators	Pacific Coast League	West			
AA	Midland RockHounds	Texas League	South			
High-A	Lansing Lugnuts	Midwest League	East			
Low-A	Stockton Ports	California League	North			
Rookie	ACL Athletics	Arizona Complex League	East			
Rookie	DSL Athletics	Dominican Summer League	Northwest			
