= Tim Lopes (baseball) =

American baseball player (born 1994)

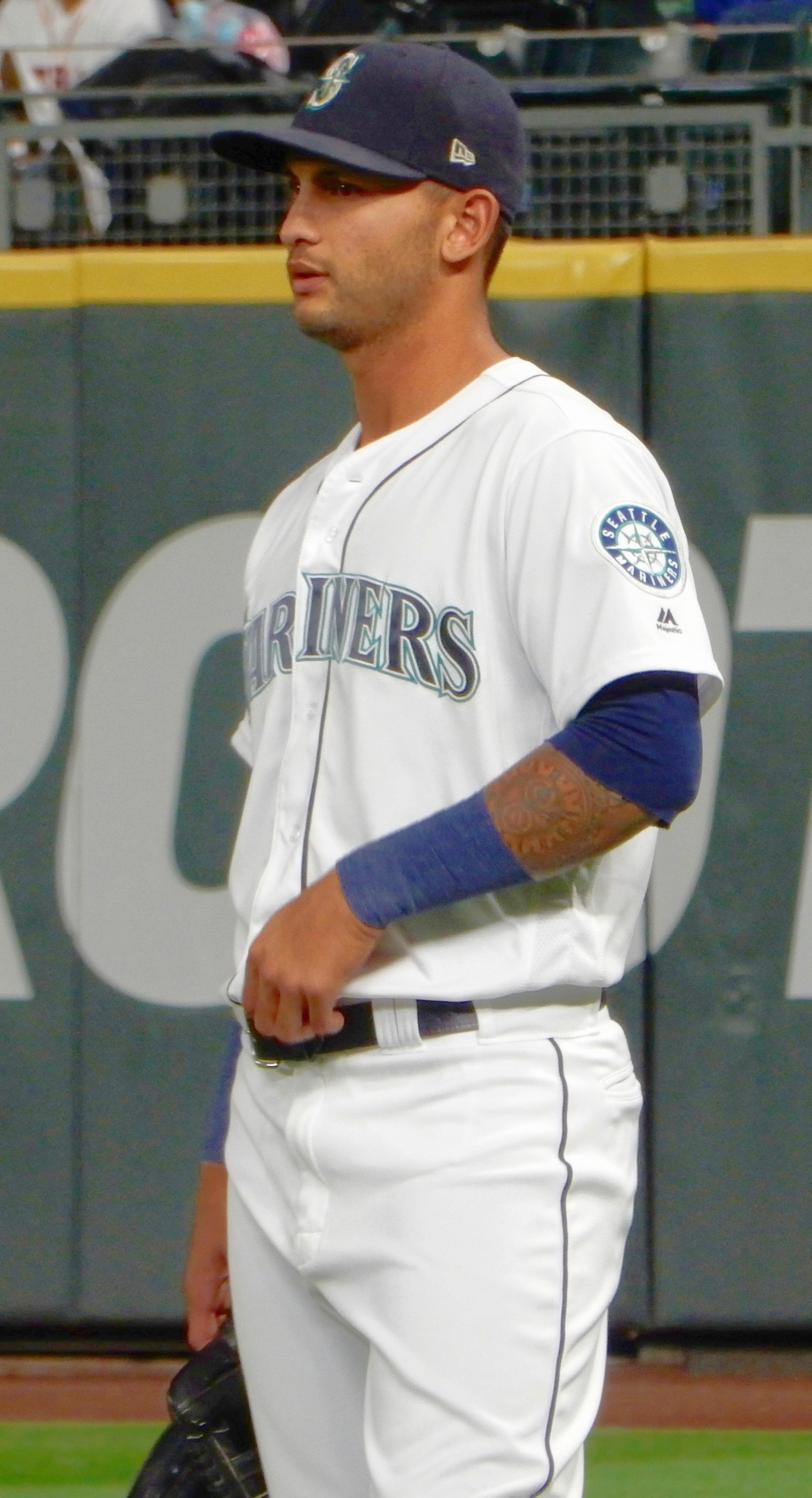
- Lopes with the Seattle Mariners in 2019
- Infielder
- Born: June 24, 1994 (age 31); Los Angeles, California, U.S.
- Batted: Right Threw: Right

MLB debut
- July 24, 2019, for the Seattle Mariners

Last MLB appearance
- September 19, 2021, for the Milwaukee Brewers

MLB statistics
- Batting average: .246
- Home runs: 3
- Runs batted in: 27
- Stats at Baseball Reference

Teams
- Seattle Mariners (2019–2020); Milwaukee Brewers (2021)

Timothy Aaron Lopes (born June 24, 1994) is an American former professional baseball infielder. He played in Major League Baseball (MLB) for the Seattle Mariners and Milwaukee Brewers.

== Professional career ==
=== Seattle Mariners ===
Lopes attended Edison High School in Huntington Beach, California. Lopes was drafted by the Seattle Mariners in the 6th round, with the 191st overall selection, of the 2012 Major League Baseball draft.

Lopes split the 2012 season between the Arizona League Mariners and the High Desert Mavericks, hitting a combined .313/.375/.476/.851 with 33 RBI. He spent the 2013 season with the Clinton LumberKings, hitting .272/.315/.344/.659 with 1 home run and 33 RBI. His 2014 season was spent with High Desert, hitting .238/.308/.337/.645 with 4 home runs and 44 RBI. He spent the 2015 season with the Bakersfield Blaze, hitting .276/.340/.362/.702 with 2 home runs and 49 RBI. He spent the 2016 season with the Jackson Generals, hitting .284/.358/.355/.713 with 1 home run and 49 RBI.

=== Toronto Blue Jays ===
On September 30, 2016, Lopes was traded to the Toronto Blue Jays as the player to be named later in a previous trade that saw Seattle acquire Pat Venditte. Lopes spent the 2017 season with the Double–A New Hampshire Fisher Cats, hitting .271/.338/.390/.728 with 7 home runs and 50 RBI. He spent the 2018 season with the Triple–A Buffalo Bisons, hitting .277/.325/.364/.689 with 2 home runs and 29 RBI. Lopes elected free agency following the season on November 2, 2018.

=== Seattle Mariners (second stint) ===
Lopes signed a minor league contract to return to the Seattle Mariners on November 14, 2018. He opened the 2019 season with the Tacoma Rainiers.

On July 23, 2019, the Mariners selected Lopes' contract and promoted him to the major leagues. He made his debut on July 24, as a ninth inning defensive replacement at second base. He was placed on the 7-day concussion injured list on July 26, after being hit in the helmet by a Drew VerHagen fastball on July 25. After spending the next 11 days on the concussion list, Lopes hit his first major league home run off Adrián Morejón of the San Diego Padres on August 6.

In 2020, Lopes hit .238 with 2 home runs and 15 RBI in 46 games. On December 18, 2020, Lopes was designated for assignment by the Mariners following the signing of pitcher Chris Flexen.

=== Milwaukee Brewers ===
On December 22, 2020, Lopes was claimed off waivers by the Milwaukee Brewers. On March 8, 2021, Lopes was placed on the 60-day injured list due to a right oblique strain. On May 31, Lopes was activated off of the injured list and optioned to the Triple-A Nashville Sounds. He played seven games for the Brewers, five in mid-June and two in September. He batted 1–10 with one walk, with his final MLB hit a single against the Pittsburgh Pirates on June 12. After his single, he was caught stealing second base. Lopes was designated for assignment by the Brewers on September 29, 2021. He became a free agent following the season.

=== Colorado Rockies ===
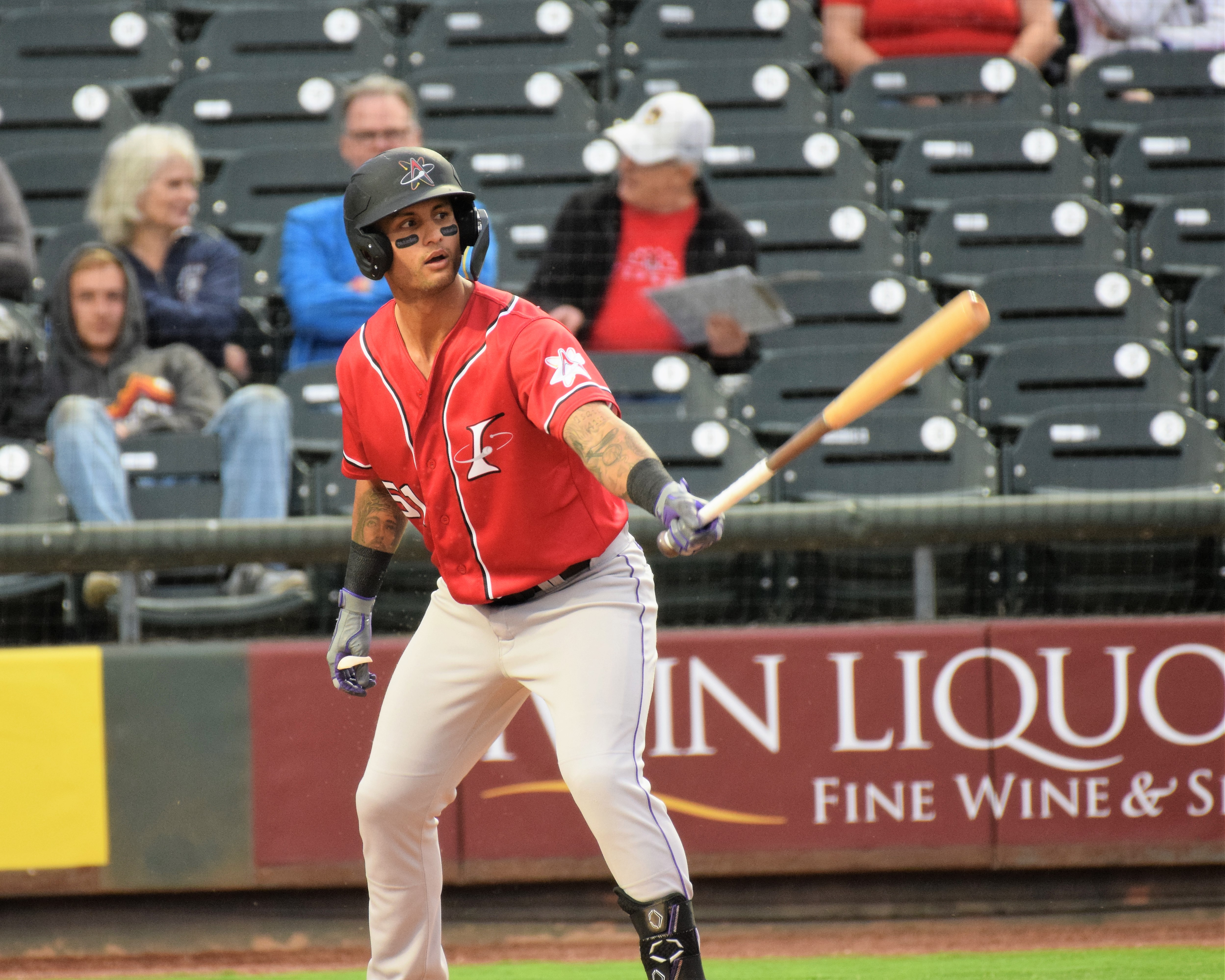
Tim Lopes, batting for the Albuquerque Isotopes

On December 17, 2021, Lopes signed a minor league contract with the Colorado Rockies. He spent the year with the Triple-A Albuquerque Isotopes, also playing in three games for the rookie–level Arizona Complex League Rockies. In 70 games for the Isotopes, Lopes hit .271/.333/.451 with nine home runs, 34 RBI, and 10 stolen bases. He elected free agency following the season on November 10, 2022.

In October 2022, he joined the Brazil national team for 2023 World Baseball Classic qualifiers.

=== San Diego Padres ===
On December 20, 2022, Lopes signed a minor league contract with the San Diego Padres. He spent the 2023 season with the Triple–A El Paso Chihuahuas, playing in 121 games and batting .282/.378/.421 with 13 home runs, 56 RBI, and 42 stolen bases. Lopes elected free agency following the season on November 6.

On March 28, 2024, on Opening Day, Lopes announced his retirement from professional baseball via an Instagram post.

== Personal life ==
Lopes is a Christian. Lopes is married to Amber Lopes. They have one daughter together.

Lopes' older brother, Christian Lopes, also played in MLB, appearing for the Oakland Athletics in 2022.

Lopes is a supporter of Compassion International.
