= Domingo Acevedo =

Dominican baseball player (born 1994)

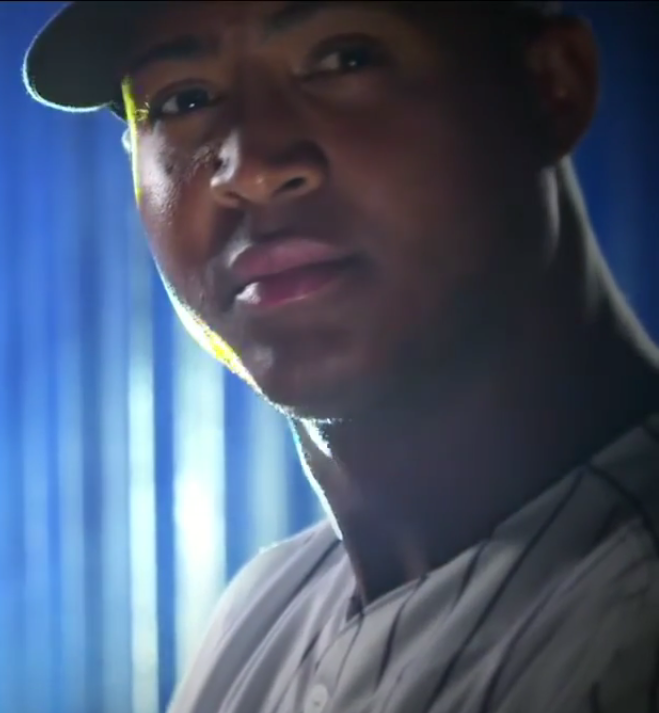

Free agent
- Pitcher
- Born: March 6, 1994 (age 32); Villa Los Almácigos, Dominican Republic
- Bats: Right Throws: Right

MLB debut
- June 21, 2021, for the Oakland Athletics

MLB statistics (through 2023 season)
- Win–loss record: 4–4
- Earned run average: 4.09
- Strikeouts: 74
- Stats at Baseball Reference

Teams
- Oakland Athletics (2021–2023)

Domingo Antonio Acevedo (born March 6, 1994) is a Dominican professional baseball pitcher who is a free agent. Listed at 6 feet 7 inches (2.01 m) and 240 pounds (110 kg), he throws and bats right-handed. For a few hours on July 21, 2018, Acevedo was on the New York Yankees’ active roster, but did not appear in a game, earning him the distinction of being a “phantom ballplayer”, a distinction which he held until his Major League Baseball (MLB) debut in 2021. He has previously played in MLB for the Oakland Athletics.

== Career ==
=== New York Yankees ===
Acevedo signed with the New York Yankees as an international free agent on March 3, 2013, for a $7,500 signing bonus. He made his professional debut in 2013 with the Dominican Summer League Yankees where he had a 1–2 win–loss record and a 2.63 earned run average (ERA) in 11 games (ten starts) and spent 2014 with the Gulf Coast Yankees where he pitched to a 0–1 record and 4.11 ERA in only five starts. Acevedo started 2015 with the Charleston RiverDogs, making one start before going on the disabled list. When he returned from injury he was sent to the Staten Island Yankees. In 12 starts between the two teams he compiled a 3–0 record, 1.81 ERA, and 1.11 WHIP. He started 2016 with Charleston, and later joined the Tampa Yankees. He finished 2016 with a 5–4 record and a 2.61 ERA in 18 combined starts between the two teams.

Acevedo began the 2017 season with Tampa and was promoted to the Trenton Thunder and Scranton/Wilkes-Barre RailRiders throughout the season. He appeared in the 2017 All-Star Futures Game. In 23 combined starts between Tampa, Trenton and Scranton/Wilkes-Barre Acevedo was 6–6 with a 3.25 ERA. The Yankees added him to their 40-man roster after the season.

In 2018, Acevedo began the season with Trenton. He spent six weeks on the disabled list due to a blister. The Yankees promoted him to the major leagues on July 21, but in only a few hours, he was optioned back to Double-A. He finished the year with a 3–3 record and 2.99 ERA between Staten Island and Scranton.

Acevedo was released by the Yankees organization on August 23, 2019. He re–signed with the team on a minor league contract on August 26. Acevedo finished the year with an 8–1 record and 4.35 ERA in 51 2/3 innings between Scranton and Trenton. Acevedo did not play in a game in 2020 due to the cancellation of the minor league season because of the COVID-19 pandemic. On November 2, 2020, he elected free agency.

=== Oakland Athletics ===
On November 16, 2020, Acevedo signed a minor league contract with the Oakland Athletics organization. He was assigned to the Triple-A Las Vegas Aviators to begin the year, and recorded a 2.76 ERA with 27 strikeouts in 16 1/3 innings pitched. On June 21, 2021, Acevedo was selected to the 40-man roster and promoted to the major leagues. He made his MLB debut that day, pitching a scoreless inning of relief against the Texas Rangers. In the game, he also notched his first career strikeout, punching out Rangers infielder Isiah Kiner-Falefa. In 3 innings for Oakland, Acevedo posted an ERA of 9.00 with 3 strikeouts. On July 30, he was designated for assignment by the A's. He was released the following day. On August 2, Acevedo re-signed with Oakland on a minor league deal. On September 14, Acevedo was re-selected to the active roster. Acevedo began the 2022 season with the Athletics.

On September 14, 2022, in a game against the Texas Rangers, Acevedo relieved Sam Moll and struck out the only batter he faced to earn his first career save. He made 70 appearances out of the bullpen for Oakland in 2022, posting a 4–4 record and 3.33 ERA with 58 strikeouts and 4 saves in 67 2/3 innings pitched.

In 2023, Acevedo made nine appearances for the Athletics, with a 10.61 ERA with seven strikeouts in 9 1/3 innings. The Athletics designated Acevedo for assignment on May 4, 2023. He cleared waivers and was sent outright to Triple-A Las Vegas on May 6. Acevedo was released by the Athletics organization on August 22.

=== Charros de Jalisco ===
On April 26, 2024, Acevedo signed with the Charros de Jalisco of the Mexican League. In six appearances, he registered a 7.94 ERA and 6 strikeouts across 5 2/3 innings. Acevedo was waived by Jalisco on May 29.

=== Leones de Yucatán ===
On July 4, 2024, Acevedo signed with the Leones de Yucatán of the Mexican League. In 4 games for Yucatán, he posted a 5.40 ERA with 1 strikeout across 3 1/3 innings pitched. Acevedo was released by the Leones on November 12.

=== Piratas de Campeche ===
On April 15, 2025, Acevedo signed with the Piratas de Campeche of the Mexican League. In 18 starts he threw 85 innings going 4–4 with a 4.76 ERA and 82 strikeouts.

In 2026, Acevedo returned for a second season with Campeche. In 2 starts he threw 10 innings going 1–1 with a 4.50 ERA and 13 strikeouts.

=== Colorado Rockies ===
On April 28, 2026, Acevedo signed a minor league contract with the Colorado Rockies. In 8 games (6 starts) with Triple-A Albuquerque Isotopes he threw 31 innings going 2-0 with a 5.81 ERA with 35 strikeouts and 1 save. He elected free agency on November 2.
