= Zach Logue =

American baseball player (born 1996)

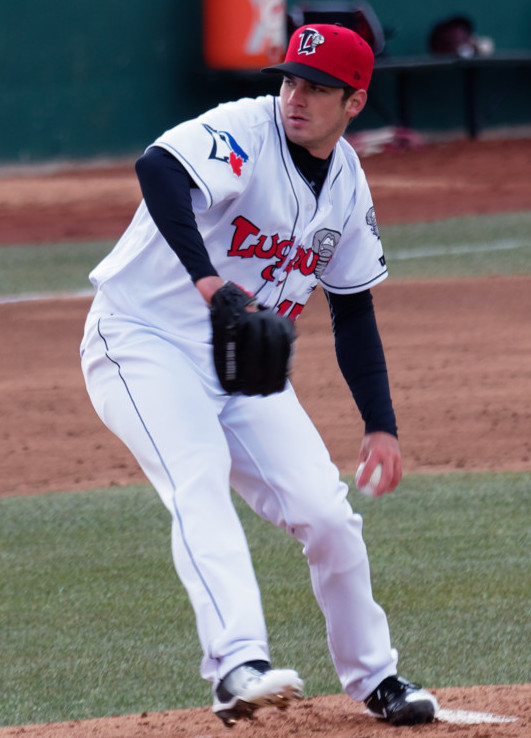
- Logue with the Lansing Lugnuts in 2018

Doosan Bears – No. 39
- Pitcher
- Born: April 23, 1996 (age 30); Mason, Ohio, U.S.
- Bats: Left Throws: Left

Professional debut
- MLB: April 19, 2022, for the Oakland Athletics
- KBO: March 23, 2025, for the Doosan Bears

MLB statistics (through 2024 season)
- Win–loss record: 3–8
- Earned run average: 7.20
- Strikeouts: 56

KBO statistics (through August 20, 2026)
- Win–loss record: 16–14
- Earned run average: 3.26
- Strikeouts: 258
- Stats at Baseball Reference

Teams
- Oakland Athletics (2022); Detroit Tigers (2023); Los Angeles Dodgers (2024); Doosan Bears (2025–present)

Zachariah Michael Logue (born April 23, 1996) is an American professional baseball pitcher for the Doosan Bears of the KBO League. He has previously played in Major League Baseball (MLB) for the Oakland Athletics, Detroit Tigers, and Los Angeles Dodgers.

== Amateur career ==
Logue attended Archbishop Moeller High School in Cincinnati, Ohio, and the University of Kentucky, where he played college baseball for the Kentucky Wildcats. In 2016, he played collegiate summer baseball with the Orleans Firebirds of the Cape Cod Baseball League.

== Professional career ==
=== Toronto Blue Jays ===
The Toronto Blue Jays selected Logue in the ninth round of the 2017 Major League Baseball draft. He spent his first professional season with the rookie-level Bluefield Blue Jays and Low-A Vancouver Canadians, logging a 1.47 ERA in 12 combined appearances.

In 2018, Logue played for the Single-A Lansing Lugnuts and the High-A Dunedin Blue Jays, and pitched to a 12–4 record and 3.15 ERA with 129 strikeouts in 154 1/3 innings of work across 27 appearances (25 of them starts). In 2019, Logue split the year between the Double-A New Hampshire Fisher Cats and Triple-A Buffalo Bisons, recording a cumulative 4.14 ERA with 83 strikeouts in 104 1/3 innings of work in 20 games between the two teams. Logue did not play in a game in 2020 due to the cancellation of the minor league season because of the COVID-19 pandemic. He started the 2021 season with New Hampshire before being promoted to Buffalo. On the year, he worked to a 12–4 record and 3.67 ERA with 144 strikeouts in 125 innings pitched in 25 total games (24 of them starts). He was added to the 40-man roster following the season on November 19, 2021.

=== Oakland Athletics ===
On March 16, 2022, the Blue Jays traded Logue, Gunnar Hoglund, Kevin Smith, and Kirby Snead to the Oakland Athletics for Matt Chapman. On April 15, he was added to the Athletics roster as a COVID-related substitute.

Logue made his major league debut on April 19 against the Baltimore Orioles, pitching 1 1/3 scoreless innings and striking out the first batter he faced, Ramón Urías, while recording the win. During the season, he pitched 57 innings over 14 games, with a 3–8 record and 6.79 ERA. He also made 17 starts for the Triple–A Las Vegas Aviators, with a 3–6 record and 8.12 ERA. Logue was designated for assignment by the Athletics on December 21.

=== Detroit Tigers ===
On December 23, 2022, Logue was claimed off waivers by the Detroit Tigers who then designated him for assignment on December 31. On January 6, 2023, he was sent outright to the Triple-A Toledo Mud Hens. Logue was selected to the active roster on June 29 and made three appearances before he was designated for assignment on August 7. He allowed nine runs in 13 innings . He cleared waivers and was sent outright to Toledo on August 9. In 27 appearances (21 starts) for Toledo during the season, he had a 6.58 ERA and 3–10 record. On October 2, Logue elected free agency.

=== Atlanta Braves ===
On December 8, 2023, Logue signed a minor league contract with the Atlanta Braves. In 23 games (12 starts) for the Triple–A Gwinnett Stripers, he compiled a 2.88 ERA with 86 strikeouts across 90 2/3 innings pitched. On July 24, 2024, the Braves selected his contract, adding him to their active roster. Despite multiple stints on Atlanta's active roster, he did not appear for the team and was designated for assignment on September 1. He cleared waivers and elected free agency on September 5.

=== Los Angeles Dodgers ===
On September 12, 2024, Logue signed a minor league contract with the Los Angeles Dodgers and was assigned to the Triple–A Oklahoma City Baseball Club. After pitching three innings in one game in Oklahoma City, Logue had his contract purchased and he was added to the Dodgers' active roster on September 18. He pitched two innings in the majors, allowing four earned runs. Logue was non-tendered by the Dodgers on November 22, and became a free agent.

=== Doosan Bears ===
On December 18, 2024, Logue signed with the Doosan Bears of the KBO League. He made 30 appearances (29 starts) for Doosan in 2025, compiling a 10-8 record and 2.81 ERA with 156 strikeouts over 176 innings of work.

On December 18, 2025, Logue re-signed with the Bears on a one-year, $1.1 million contract.
