= Jake Lemoine =

American baseball player (born 1993)

- Pitcher
- Born: November 28, 1993 (age 32); Nederland, Texas, U.S.
- Batted: Right Threw: Right

MLB debut
- April 8, 2022, for the Oakland Athletics

Last MLB appearance
- May 28, 2022, for the Oakland Athletics

MLB statistics
- Win–loss record: 0–0
- Earned run average: 7.71
- Strikeouts: 13
- Stats at Baseball Reference

Teams
- Oakland Athletics (2022)

Jacob Alan Lemoine (born November 28, 1993) is an American former professional baseball pitcher. He played one season in Major League Baseball (MLB) for the Oakland Athletics in 2022.

== High school and college ==
Lemoine attended Bridge City High School in Bridge City, Texas. He was drafted in the 21st round, 666th overall, of the 2012 MLB draft by the Texas Rangers but did not sign. He attended the University of Houston for three years (2013–2015), playing college baseball for the Cougars. He played for the 2014 USA Baseball Collegiate National Team, going 2–2 with a 2.45 ERA in 18 1/3 innings for them. During his junior year of 2015, he suffered a right shoulder injury that limited him to just 5 games that season.

== Professional career ==
=== Texas Rangers ===
He was drafted in the 4th round, 108th overall, of the 2015 MLB draft by the Texas Rangers and signed with them for a $528,000 bonus. Lemoine did not appear in a professional game in 2015 and 2016, after dealing with right shoulder problems that led to rotator cuff surgery. He made his professional debut in 2017 with the Hickory Crawdads of the Single–A South Atlantic League, going 3–4 with a 2.96 ERA in 70 innings. He spent the 2018 season with the Down East Wood Ducks of the High–A Carolina League, going 3–4 with a 2.40 ERA in 56 innings. He split the 2019 season between the Frisco RoughRiders of the Double-A Texas League and the Nashville Sounds of the Triple-A Pacific Coast League, going a combined 2–2 with a 4.45 ERA over 54 2/3 innings. Lemoine did not play in 2020 due to the cancellation of the Minor League Baseball season because of the COVID-19 pandemic. Lemoine spent the 2021 season with the Round Rock Express of the Triple-A West, going 7–4 with a 2.86 ERA and 43 strikeouts over 56 2/3 innings. He became a free agent following the 2021 season.

=== Oakland Athletics ===
On January 8, 2022, Lemoine signed a minor league contract with the Oakland Athletics. On April 7, the Athletics selected Lemoine's contract, adding him to their opening day roster. He made 9 appearances for Oakland, working to a 7.71 ERA with 13 strikeouts in 16 1/3 innings pitched. Lemoine was designated for assignment on July 12. He cleared waivers and was sent outright to the Triple-A Las Vegas Aviators on July 16. Lemoine spent the remainder of the year in Triple-A, posting a 2–1 record and 4.95 ERA with 26 strikeouts in 36 1/3 innings of work. He elected free agency following the season on November 10.

=== Lancaster Barnstormers ===
On April 12, 2023, Lemoine signed with the Lancaster Barnstormers of the Atlantic League of Professional Baseball. In 6 starts for Lancaster, he posted a 1–3 record and 5.57 ERA with 19 strikeouts in 32 1/3 innings pitched. With Lancaster, Lemoine won the Atlantic League championship.

Lemoine retired from professional baseball following the 2023 season.
