= Dany Jiménez =

Dominican baseball player (born 1993)

Free agent
- Pitcher
- Born: December 23, 1993 (age 32); San Cristóbal, Dominican Republic
- Bats: Right Throws: Right

MLB debut
- July 23, 2020, for the San Francisco Giants

MLB statistics (through 2024 season)
- Win–loss record: 4–9
- Earned run average: 3.93
- Strikeouts: 81
- Saves: 13
- Stats at Baseball Reference

Teams
- San Francisco Giants (2020); Oakland Athletics (2022–2024)

Dany Jiménez (born December 23, 1993) is a Dominican professional baseball pitcher who is a free agent. He has previously played in Major League Baseball (MLB) for the San Francisco Giants and Oakland Athletics.

== Career ==
=== Toronto Blue Jays ===
Jiménez signed with the Toronto Blue Jays as an international free agent on August 6, 2015. He spent the 2015 season with the Dominican Summer League Blue Jays, going 1–0 with a 5.19 ERA over 8 2/3 innings. He split the 2016 season between the DSL and the Rookie-level Gulf Coast League Blue Jays, going a combined 3–2 with a 2.72 ERA over 46 1/3 innings in which he struck out 48 batters. He split the 2017 season between the GCL and the Low–A Vancouver Canadians, going a combined 2–3 with a 5.49 ERA over 19 2/3 innings in which he struck out 24 batters.

Jiménez spent the 2018 season with the Single–A Lansing Lugnuts, transitioning to being a full-time relief pitcher, going 6–2 with 13 saves and a 3.84 ERA and 80 strikeouts over 63 1/3 innings (averaging 11.4 strikeouts per nine innings). He split the 2019 season between the High–A Dunedin Blue Jays and the Double‑A New Hampshire Fisher Cats, going a combined 7–3 with 10 saves and a 2.59 ERA and 90 strikeouts over 59 innings (averaging 14.2 strikeouts per nine innings).

=== San Francisco Giants ===
On December 12, 2019, Jiménez was selected by the San Francisco Giants in the 2019 Rule 5 draft. He made his major league debut on July 23, 2020, pitching a scoreless 1/3 inning against the Los Angeles Dodgers. In two games, he faced eight batters and allowed one run and three walks in 1 1/3 innings pitched. Jiménez was designated for assignment by San Francisco on July 30.

=== Toronto Blue Jays (second stint) ===
On August 2, 2020, Jiménez cleared waivers and was returned to the Toronto Blue Jays organization. He did not play in another game in 2020 due to the cancellation of the minor league season because of the COVID-19 pandemic.

On December 10, 2020, the Oakland Athletics selected Jiménez in the second round of the Rule 5 draft. He struggled to a 6.00 ERA with three strikeouts in three innings pitched across three spring training appearances.

On March 15, 2021, Jiménez was again returned to the Blue Jays organization and invited to spring training as a non-roster invitee. Jiménez spent the 2021 season with the Triple-A Buffalo Bisons. In 39 appearances for Buffalo, he went 3–3 with a 2.22 ERA and 79 strikeouts and 3 saves in 44 2/3 innings of work. On October 5, Jiménez elected free agency.

=== Oakland Athletics ===
On November 4, 2021, Jiménez signed a minor league contract with the Oakland Athletics. On April 7, 2022, the A's selected Jiménez's contract, adding him to their Opening Day roster. He made 34 appearances for Oakland in 2022, posting a 3–4 record and 3.41 ERA with 34 strikeouts and 11 saves across 34 1/3 innings pitched. His season ended on August 27 when he was placed on the injured list with a right shoulder strain.

He made 7 appearances for Oakland in 2023 before he was placed on the 60-day injured list with a right shoulder strain on April 19, 2023. On August 5, Jiménez was activated from the injured list. In 25 total games, he logged a 3.47 ERA with 21 strikeouts across 23 1/3 innings of work.

Jiménez made 25 appearances for Oakland in 2024, recording a 4.91 ERA with 25 strikeouts across 25 2/3 innings pitched. On November 22, 2024, the Athletics non–tendered Jiménez, making him a free agent.

=== Sultanes de Monterrey ===
On January 17, 2025, Jiménez signed a minor league contract with the Atlanta Braves. He was released by Atlanta prior to the start of the season on March 24.

On April 17, 2025, Jiménez signed with the Sultanes de Monterrey of the Mexican League. In seven appearances for Monterrey, he struggled to a 24.30 ERA with three strikeouts across 3 1/3 innings pitched. Jiménez was released by the Sultanes on May 13.

=== Rieleros de Aguascalientes ===
On May 17, 2025, Jiménez signed with the Rieleros de Aguascalientes of the Mexican League. In 18 appearances for Aguascalientes, he posted a 1–0 record and 7.56 ERA with 18 strikeouts across 16 2/3 innings pitched. Jiménez was released by the Rieleros on June 26.

== See also ==
- Rule 5 draft results
