= Adam Oller =

American baseball player (born 1994)

Kia Tigers – No. 33
- Pitcher
- Born: October 17, 1994 (age 32); Conroe, Texas, U.S.
- Bats: Right Throws: Right

Professional debut
- MLB: April 12, 2022, for the Oakland Athletics
- KBO: March 25, 2025, for the Kia Tigers

MLB statistics (through 2024 season)
- Win–loss record: 5–13
- Earned run average: 6.54
- Strikeouts: 95

KBO statistics (through August 16, 2026)
- Win–loss record: 22-15
- Earned run average: 3.41
- Strikeouts: 297
- Stats at Baseball Reference

Teams
- Oakland Athletics (2022–2023); Miami Marlins (2024); Kia Tigers (2025–present)

Career highlights and awards
- KBO: KBO All-Star (2026)

Adam Samuel Oller (born October 17, 1994) is an American professional baseball pitcher for the Kia Tigers of the KBO League. He has previously played in Major League Baseball (MLB) for the Oakland Athletics and Miami Marlins. He was drafted by the Pittsburgh Pirates in the 20th round of the 2016 MLB draft.

== Amateur career ==
A native of Conroe, Texas, Oller attended Concordia Lutheran High School in Tomball, Texas, where he was a teammate of current major leaguer Glenn Otto. As a senior, Oller helped the Crusaders reach the State Championship Game and was named all-state at both pitcher and catcher. Oller was also a standout football player and was named to the all-state team twice during his high school career.

Oller played college baseball at Northwestern State University, where in addition to pitching, he played catcher. In 2015, he played collegiate summer baseball with the Falmouth Commodores of the Cape Cod Baseball League, becoming the first NSU player invited to play in the league since 2010.

At NSU, Oller earned second-team All-America honors from Collegiate Baseball Magazine and third-team honors from the American Baseball Coaches Association following the 2016 season. Oller concluded his Demons career ranked fourth in career innings pitched (310 1-3), career ERA (2.06) and career starts (43), eighth in career wins (20) and ninth in career winning percentage (.741). He holds single-season top-10 marks in innings pitched (109.2, 2nd and 108.1, 3rd), ERA (1.23, 5th) and winning percentage (.889, T-8th).

== Professional career ==
=== Pittsburgh Pirates ===
Oller was drafted by the Pittsburgh Pirates in the 20th round of the 2016 Major League Baseball draft. He signed with the Pirates for a $70,000 signing bonus. He made his professional debut for the rookie-level Bristol Pirates, posting a 4.45 ERA in 13 appearances. Oller spent the 2017 season with the Low–A West Virginia Black Bears, pitching to a 1.59 ERA with 50 strikeouts in 45.1 innings pitched. In 2018, Oller split the year between the Low-A West Virginia Power and the High-A Bradenton Marauders, struggling to a 6.29 ERA with 68 strikeouts in 73.0 innings of work across 29 contests between the two teams. He was released by the Pirates organization on November 6, 2018.

=== Windy City ThunderBolts ===
On January 4, 2019, Oller signed with the Windy City ThunderBolts of the independent Frontier League. He made 4 appearances (all starts) for Windy City, posting a 2-1 record and stellar 0.67 ERA with 45 strikeouts in 27.0 innings of work.

=== San Francisco Giants ===
On May 27, 2019, Oller signed a minor league contract with the San Francisco Giants organization. He spent the remainder of the year with the Single-A Augusta GreenJackets, logging a 5-6 record and 4.02 ERA with 93 strikeouts in 17 starts for the team.

=== New York Mets ===
On December 12, 2019, the New York Mets selected Oller in the minor league phase of the Rule 5 Draft. Oller did not play in a game in 2020 due to the cancellation of the minor league season because of the COVID-19 pandemic. He split the 2021 season between the Double-A Binghamton Rumble Ponies and the Triple-A Syracuse Mets, pitching to a 9-4 record and 3.45 ERA with 138 strikeouts in 120 innings pitched across 23 starts between the two affiliates. The Mets added him to their 40-man roster on November 19, 2021 to protect him from the Rule 5 draft.

=== Oakland Athletics ===
On March 12, 2022, the Mets traded Oller and J. T. Ginn to the Oakland Athletics in exchange for Chris Bassitt. On April 2, Oakland announced that Oller had made the Opening Day roster. Oller made his MLB debut on April 12 as the starting pitcher against the Tampa Bay Rays. Coincidentally, the starting pitcher for the Rays was Tommy Romero, who was also making his MLB debut in the game. On July 25, Oller earned his first career win after pitching 5.0 innings against the Houston Astros, allowing 4 runs (3 earned) on 4 hits and 2 walks with 4 strikeouts. He finished his rookie campaign with a 2–8 record and 6.30 ERA with 46 strikeouts in 74 1/3 innings pitched.

Oller began the 2023 season up and down between Oakland and Las Vegas. In 12 games (9 starts) for the Aviators, he posted a 7.11 ERA with 59 strikeouts in 50 2/3 innings pitched; in 9 contests for Oakland, Oller struggled to a 10.07 ERA with 13 strikeouts in 19 2/3 innings of work.

=== Seattle Mariners ===
On July 12, 2023, Oller was claimed off waivers by the Seattle Mariners. In 12 starts for the Triple–A Tacoma Rainiers, he registered a 6–4 record and 5.51 ERA with 62 strikeouts in 63 2/3 innings pitched. Following the season on October 31, the Mariners removed Oller from their 40–man roster and sent him outright to Triple–A Tacoma. He elected free agency on November 6.

=== Cleveland Guardians ===
On November 13, 2023, Oller signed a minor league contract with the Cleveland Guardians that included an invitation to spring training. He began the 2024 season with the Triple-A Columbus Clippers. In 12 games (6 starts) for Columbus, he struggled to a 7.48 ERA with 33 strikeouts across 27 2/3 innings pitched. On July 3, 2024, Oller was released by the Guardians organization.

=== Miami Marlins ===
On July 9, 2024, Oller signed a minor league contract with the Miami Marlins. In 6 games (3 starts) for the Triple–A Jacksonville Jumbo Shrimp, he compiled a 3–0 record and 2.88 ERA with 24 strikeouts over 25 innings of work. On August 19, the Marlins selected Oller's contract, adding him to their active roster. In 8 starts for Miami, he compiled a 2–4 record and 5.31 ERA with 36 strikeouts across 42 1/3 innings pitched. On November 1, Oller was removed from the 40–man roster and elected free agency.

=== Kia Tigers ===
On December 16, 2024, Oller signed a one-year, $1 million contract with the Kia Tigers of the KBO League. He made 26 starts for the Tigers during the 2025 season, posting an 11-7 record and 3.62 ERA with 169 strikeouts over 149 innings of work.

On December 24, 2025, Oller re-signed with the Tigers on a one-year, $1.2 million contract.

== See also ==
- Rule 5 draft results
