= Kevin Smith (baseball) =

American baseball player (born 1996)

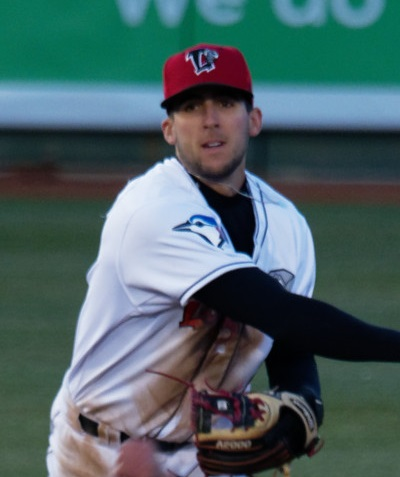
- Smith with the Lansing Lugnuts in 2018
- Third baseman / Shortstop
- Born: July 4, 1996 (age 29); East Greenbush, New York, U.S.
- Batted: Right Threw: Right

MLB debut
- August 18, 2021, for the Toronto Blue Jays

Last MLB appearance
- May 26, 2024, for the New York Yankees

MLB statistics
- Batting average: .173
- Home runs: 8
- Runs batted in: 25
- Stats at Baseball Reference

Teams
- Toronto Blue Jays (2021); Oakland Athletics (2022–2023); New York Yankees (2024)

Kevin Smith (born July 4, 1996) is an American former professional baseball third baseman and shortstop. He played in Major League Baseball (MLB) for the Toronto Blue Jays, Oakland Athletics, and New York Yankees.

== Amateur career ==
Smith graduated from Columbia High School in East Greenbush, New York, and later attended the University of Maryland, College Park. He played three seasons as the starting shortstop for the Maryland Terrapins. In his freshman season, Smith appeared in 66 games and recorded a .273 batting average, seven home runs, 35 runs batted in (RBI), and a team-leading 11 stolen bases. As a sophomore, Smith hit .259 with eight home runs and 34 RBI. In 2016, he played collegiate summer baseball for the Yarmouth–Dennis Red Sox of the Cape Cod Baseball League, where he hit .301 with 12 doubles and two home runs, was a league all-star and named a top prospect in the league by Baseball America, Perfect Game, and D1Baseball.com, and was named the Most Valuable Player (MVP) of the league's championship series after batting .500 with a home run and three RBI to help Yarmouth–Dennis win the league championship for the third-consecutive season. In his final year with the Terrapins, Smith hit .268 in 54 games played, and added 13 home runs and 48 RBI.

== Professional career ==
=== Toronto Blue Jays ===
==== Minor leagues ====
The Toronto Blue Jays drafted Smith in the fourth round, with the 129th overall selection, of the 2017 Major League Baseball draft. He signed for a $405,100 signing bonus, and was assigned to the Bluefield Blue Jays. In 61 games for Bluefield, Smith hit .271 with eight home runs, 43 RBI, and nine stolen bases. In 2018, he played for both the Single–A Lansing Lugnuts and the High–A Dunedin Blue Jays, slashing a combined .302/.358/.528 with 25 home runs, 93 RBI, and 29 stolen bases in 129 games.

Smith played the 2019 season entirely with the Double-A New Hampshire Fisher Cats, hitting .209 with 19 home runs, 61 RBI, and 11 stolen bases. Following the season he played in 18 games for the Scottsdale Scorpions of the Arizona Fall League. He did not play in a game in 2020, due to the cancellation of the minor league season because of the COVID-19 pandemic. In 2021, Smith was assigned to the Triple-A Buffalo Bisons, where he hit .286 with a team-leading 19 home runs and 63 RBI prior to being called up. He earned the 2021 Stan Barron Most Valuable Player Award, an award for Bisons team MVP, as voted on by his teammates.

==== Major leagues ====
On August 18, 2021, the Blue Jays selected Smith's contract and called him up to the major leagues. On August 29, Smith hit his first career home run off of Detroit Tigers starter Matthew Boyd.

=== Oakland Athletics ===
On March 16, 2022, the Blue Jays traded Smith, Gunnar Hoglund, Zach Logue, and Kirby Snead to the Oakland Athletics for Matt Chapman. Smith spent the bulk of the year with the Triple-A Las Vegas Aviators, also appearing in 47 games for Oakland. In 139 at-bats, he hit .180/.216/.302 with two home runs, 13 RBI, and 4 stolen bases.

Smith was optioned to Triple-A Las Vegas to begin the 2023 season.

=== New York Yankees ===
On January 8, 2024, Smith signed a minor league contract with the New York Yankees. He began the season with the Triple-A Scranton/Wilkes-Barre RailRiders. On April 13, Smith was selected to the major league roster. He made only one appearance for the team and did not record an at–bat before he was designated for assignment on April 18. Smith cleared waivers and was sent outright to Triple–A Scranton on April 20. On May 25, the Yankees selected Smith's contract. He made one appearance as a pinch runner before he was removed from the roster and outrighted to Triple–A on May 28. Smith initially rejected the assignment and elected free agency, but on the following day, accepted the assignment and was assigned to Triple–A Scranton/Wilkes-Barre. He elected free agency on October 31.

On March 24, 2025, Smith announced his retirement from professional baseball.
