= James Kaprielian =

American baseball player (born 1994)

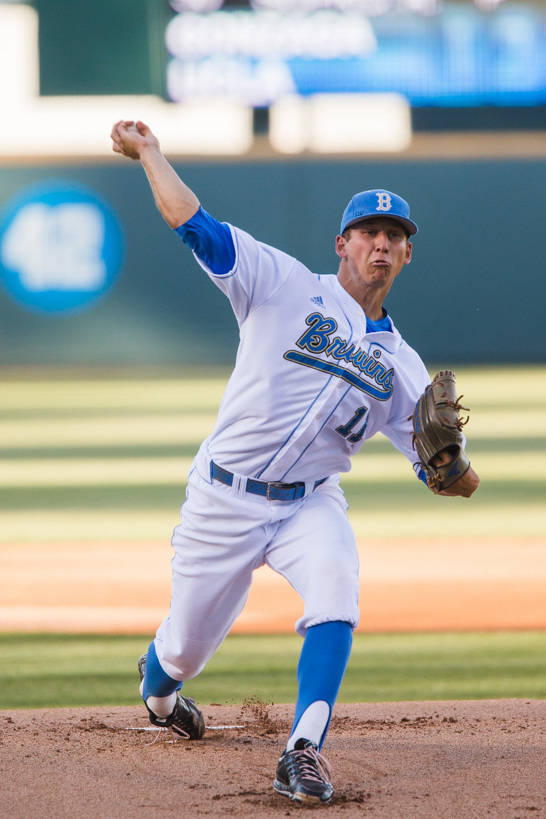
- Kaprielian with the UCLA Bruins in 2015

Guerreros de Oaxaca – No. 22
- Pitcher
- Born: March 2, 1994 (age 32); Laguna Hills, California, U.S.
- Bats: Right Throws: Right

MLB debut
- August 16, 2020, for the Oakland Athletics

MLB statistics (through 2023 season)
- Win–loss record: 15–20
- Earned run average: 4.61
- Strikeouts: 282
- Stats at Baseball Reference

Teams
- Oakland Athletics (2020–2023)

James Douglas Kaprielian (/kəˈprɪl.i.ən/; born March 2, 1994) is an American professional baseball pitcher for the Guerreros de Oaxaca of the Mexican League. He has previously played in Major League Baseball (MLB) for the Oakland Athletics. He attended the University of California, Los Angeles (UCLA), where he played college baseball for the UCLA Bruins, and was drafted by the New York Yankees with the 16th pick in the first round of the 2015 MLB draft.

== Amateur career ==
Kaprielian attended Arnold O. Beckman High School in Irvine, California. During his career he went 33–3 with a 0.96 earned run average (ERA) and 250 strikeouts. He was drafted by the Seattle Mariners in the 40th round of the 2012 MLB draft. He did not sign with the Mariners and enrolled at the University of California, Los Angeles (UCLA) to play college baseball for the UCLA Bruins. As a freshman in 2013, Kaprielian appeared in 34 games as a relief pitcher, recording a 1.55 ERA with 53 strikeouts. In 2013, he played collegiate summer baseball in the Cape Cod Baseball League for the Yarmouth-Dennis Red Sox, and was named a league all-star. As a sophomore, he was converted into a starter. He started 15 games, going 7–6 with a 2.29 ERA and 108 strikeouts.

On May 15, 2015, Kaprielian combined with David Berg for the first no-hitter in UCLA history. Kaprielian pitched the first nine innings and Berg pitched the tenth inning to complete the no-hitter.

== Professional career ==
=== New York Yankees ===
Kaprielian was considered one of the top prospects for the 2015 MLB draft, and was selected by the New York Yankees in the first round, with the 16th overall selection. He signed with the Yankees, receiving a $2.65 million signing bonus, and spent his first professional season with both the GCL Yankees and Staten Island Yankees, posting a combined 0–1 record and 3.97 ERA in 11 1/3 total innings between both teams.

Kaprielian received a non-roster invitation to spring training in 2016. He began the season with the Tampa Yankees, but only played in three games due to an injured flexor tendon in his right elbow.

Heading into the 2017 season, Kaprielian was considered the 58th best prospect in MLB. His elbow discomfort persisted, and he began the season on the disabled list. On April 18, 2017, he underwent Tommy John surgery to repair a torn ulnar collateral ligament, ending his season.

=== Oakland Athletics ===
On July 31, 2017, the Yankees traded Kaprielian to the Oakland Athletics, along with fellow prospects Jorge Mateo and Dustin Fowler, in exchange for Sonny Gray. He did not appear for the organization during the 2017 or 2018 seasons.

On November 20, 2018, the Athletics added Kaprielian to their 40-man roster to protect him from the Rule 5 draft. Kaprielian made his debut with the High-A Stockton Ports on May 19, 2019. He accumulated a 4.46 ERA in 36 1/3 innings with a 43:8 K-to-BB ratio before the Athletics promoted him to the Double-A Midland RockHounds on July 23. He was promoted again to Triple-A at the end of August.

On August 16, 2020, Kaprielian made his MLB debut with two innings against the San Francisco Giants. He allowed a home run to the first batter he faced, Brandon Crawford, and struck out one. He spent most of the season at the Athletics' alternate training site in San Jose and only pitched in two games of mop-up duty with the Athletics, allowing three runs in 3 2/3 innings of work.

On May 12, 2021, injuries in the rotation led to Kaprielian receiving a call-up to make his first MLB start at Fenway Park against the Boston Red Sox. With his father and uncle in attendance, Kaprielian was rewarded with the win, allowing one run in five innings with six strikeouts in a 4–1 victory for the Athletics. On July 27, Kaprielian collected his first career base hit, notching a single against San Diego Padres pitcher Chris Paddack. Kaprielian finished the 2021 season with an 8–5 record, a 4.07 ERA and 123 strikeouts in 119 1/3 innings.

Kaprielian started the 2022 season in the Injured List because of irritation in the AC joint of his shoulder. He made his season debut on May 1, 2022, against the Cleveland Guardians. Following the season, on December 5, Kaprielian underwent surgery to repair his right AC joint.

After allowing 23 runs in 16 innings to start the 2023 season, Kaprielian was demoted to Triple-A. He returned on May 13. Overall, he made 14 appearances (11 starts) for Oakland, and struggled to a 2–6 record and 6.34 ERA with 57 strikeouts across 61.0 innings of work. He hit the Injured List on June 30 with a shoulder strain. On August 2, 2023, it was announced that Kaprielian would miss the remainder of the season after undergoing right shoulder arthroscopic surgery to repair a labrum tear. On October 12, Kaprielian was removed from the 40–man roster and sent outright to Triple-A Las Vegas. He elected free agency on November 6.

=== Toronto Blue Jays ===
On June 18, 2024, Kaprielian signed a minor league contract with the Toronto Blue Jays. On November 6, he elected free agency.

=== Diablos Rojos del México ===
In March 2026, Kaprielian temporarily joined the Diablos Rojos del México during the 2026 Baseball Champions League Americas. He later made the Opening Day roster and officially signed with the club for the 2026 LMB season. In 14 appearances (11 starts) for the team, he posted a 5–2 record with a 5.37 ERA, 63 strikeouts, and 23 walks across 55 1/3 innings pitched.

=== Guerreros de Oaxaca ===
On July 17, 2026, Kaprielian was traded to the Guerreros de Oaxaca of the Mexican League.

== Personal life ==
Kaprielian's mother, Barbara Kaprielian, died of breast cancer in 2014 after her 14-year battle.

Kaprielian is of Armenian descent.
