= Kirby Snead =

American baseball player (born 1994)

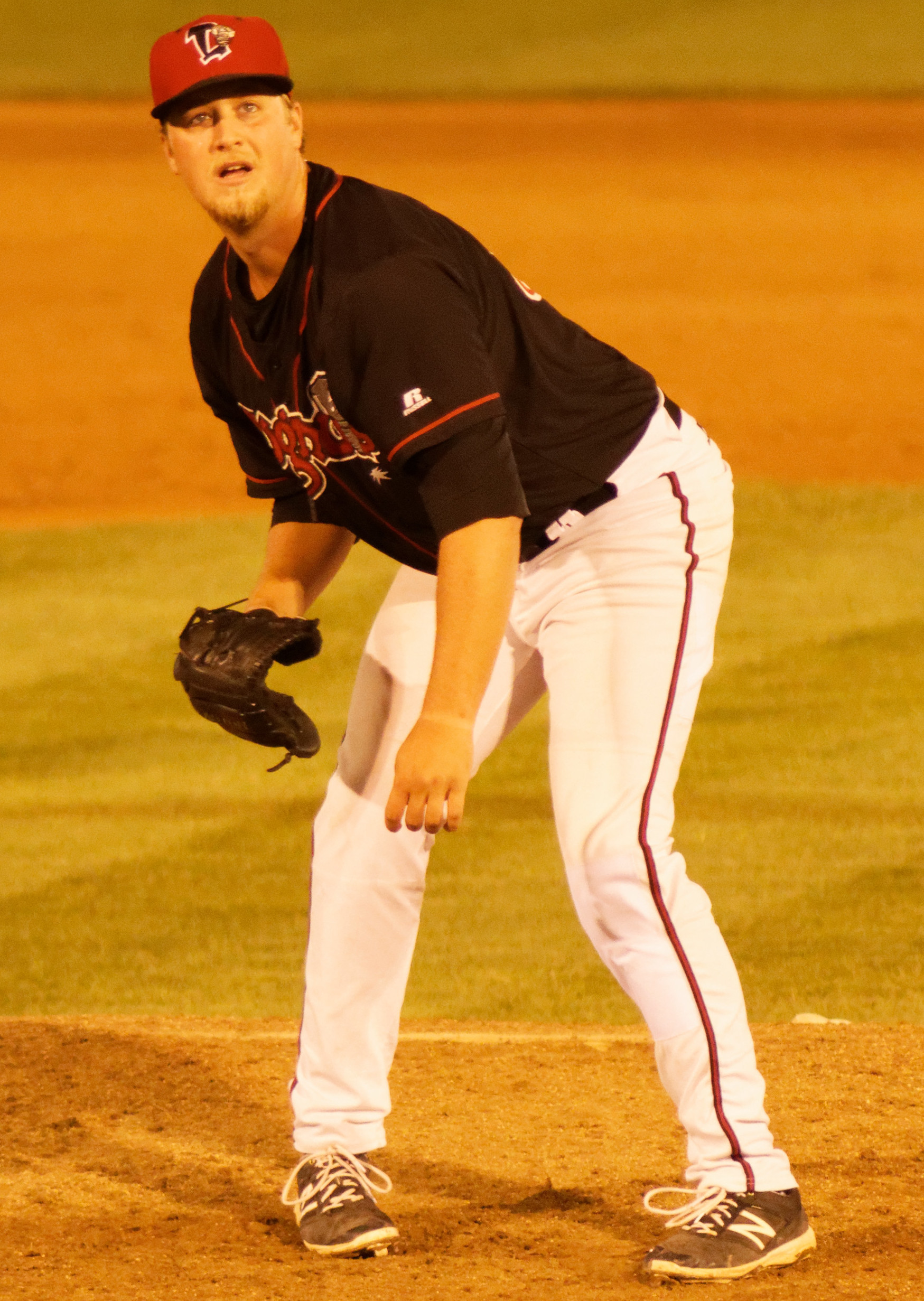
- Snead with the Lansing Lugnuts in 2016

Free agent
- Pitcher
- Born: October 7, 1994 (age 32); Alachua, Florida, U.S.
- Bats: Left Throws: Left

MLB debut
- July 28, 2021, for the Toronto Blue Jays

MLB statistics (through 2024 season)
- Win–loss record: 2–4
- Earned run average: 5.09
- Strikeouts: 58
- Stats at Baseball Reference

Teams
- Toronto Blue Jays (2021); Oakland Athletics (2022–2023); Seattle Mariners (2024)

William Kirby Snead (born October 7, 1994) is an American professional baseball pitcher who is a free agent. He has previously played in Major League Baseball (MLB) for the Toronto Blue Jays, Oakland Athletics, and Seattle Mariners.

== Amateur career ==
Snead attended Santa Fe High School in his hometown of Alachua, Florida. Undrafted out of high school, he then attended the University of Florida, and played three seasons for the Florida Gators. In his freshman season, Snead appeared in 32 games and pitched to a 3–0 win–loss record, 2.40 earned run average (ERA), and 22 strikeouts in 41 1/3 innings. As a sophomore, Snead went 1–0 in 28 games played, and posted a 3.15 ERA and 33 strikeouts in 34 1/3 innings pitched. In his final season with the Gators, Snead made an NCAA-leading 41 relief appearances, and in 35 2/3 innings went 3–1 with a 2.78 ERA and 33 strikeouts.

== Professional career ==
=== Toronto Blue Jays ===
==== Minor leagues ====
The Toronto Blue Jays selected Snead in the tenth round of the 2016 Major League Baseball draft. He received a $125,000 signing bonus and was assigned to the High-A Dunedin Blue Jays. After a single appearance for Dunedin he was assigned to the Single-A Lansing Lugnuts, where he finished the 2016 season. In 14 total relief appearances, Snead went 0–1 with a 3.62 ERA and 18 strikeouts in 27 1/3 innings. He began the 2017 season with Lansing, and was promoted to Dunedin in mid-June. Snead ended 2017 with a 7–2 record, 1.79 ERA, and 56 strikeouts in 42 appearances, and did not yield a home run. In 2018, Snead played with Dunedin and the Double-A New Hampshire Fisher Cats, pitching 51 total innings and posting a 4–5 record, 3.88 ERA, and 51 strikeouts.

Snead continued to progress through the minor league ranks in 2019, appearing for New Hampshire briefly to begin the season before being promoted to the Triple-A Buffalo Bisons. He went 7–2 with a 3.45 ERA and 68 strikeouts in 62 2/3 innings between the two teams. The 2020 minor league season was cancelled due the COVID-19 pandemic, and Snead did not play professional baseball at any level that year. He began the 2021 minor league season with the Bisons, and had posted a 2.01 ERA through 31 1/3 innings before being called-up.

==== Major leagues ====
Snead made his Major League debut on July 28, 2021, against the Boston Red Sox retiring the only two hitters he faced. He finished the season with a 2.35 ERA and 7 strikeouts in 7.2 innings.

=== Oakland Athletics ===
On March 16, 2022, the Blue Jays traded Snead, Gunnar Hoglund, Kevin Smith, and Zach Logue to the Oakland Athletics for Matt Chapman. On October 5, Snead recorded his first career save after tossing 1 1/3 scoreless innings against the Los Angeles Angels. Snead made 46 appearances for Oakland in 2022, recording a 1–1 record and 5.84 ERA with 35 strikeouts in 44.2 innings pitched.

On March 26, 2023, Snead was placed on the 60-day injured list with a strained throwing shoulder that caused him to miss a month of spring training. He was activated from the injured list on June 30. In 15 games for the Athletics, Snead registered a 4.63 ERA with 9 strikeouts in 11 2/3 innings of work. On October 27, he was removed from the 40–man roster and sent outright to the Triple–A Las Vegas Aviators. Snead elected free agency following the season on November 6.

=== Seattle Mariners ===
On January 9, 2024, Snead signed a minor league contract with the Seattle Mariners. In 12 games for the Triple–A Tacoma Rainiers, he logged a 2.92 ERA with 13 strikeouts across 12 1/3 innings pitched. On May 8, Snead had his contract selected to the Mariners' active roster. He made his season debut the same day, becoming the 1,000th Mariner in team history. In 11 games for Seattle, Snead compiled a 4.35 ERA with 7 strikeouts across 10 1/3 innings pitched. On June 11, Snead was designated for assignment by the Mariners. He cleared waivers and was sent outright to Tacoma on June 15. Snead elected free agency on October 1.

=== Staten Island FerryHawks ===
On May 20, 2025, Snead signed with the Staten Island FerryHawks of the Atlantic League of Professional Baseball. In 37 appearances for Staten Island, Snead recorded a 1.80 ERA with 41 strikeouts over 35 innings of work. On July 11, Snead signed with the Toros de Tijuana of the Mexican League. On July 19, he was placed on the reserve list and returned to the Ferry Hawks. He became a free agent following the season.

=== Philadelphia Phillies ===
On May 16, 2026, Snead signed a minor league contract with the Philadelphia Phillies. In 34 games (1 start) with Triple-A Lehigh Valley IronPigs he threw 49 innings going 6-3 with a 2.76 ERA with 47 strikeouts and 3 saves. He elected free agency on November 2.
