= Matt Chapman =

American baseball player (born 1993)

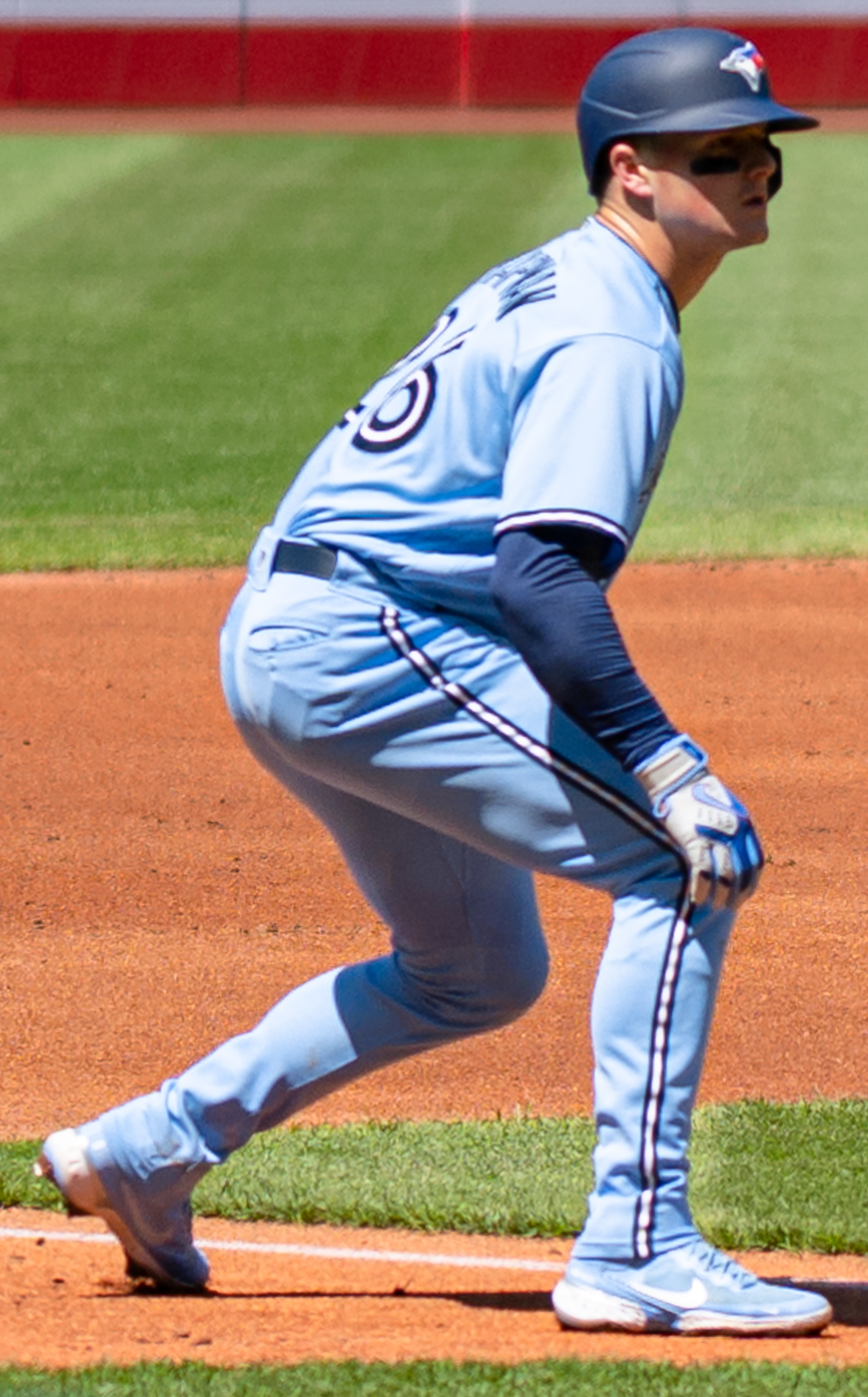
- Chapman with the Toronto Blue Jays in 2022

San Francisco Giants – No. 26
- Third baseman
- Born: April 28, 1993 (age 33); Victorville, California, U.S.
- Bats: Right Throws: Right

MLB debut
- June 15, 2017, for the Oakland Athletics

MLB statistics (through 2026 season)
- Batting average: .240
- Hits: 1,073
- Home runs: 210
- Runs batted in: 607
- Stats at Baseball Reference

Teams
- Oakland Athletics (2017–2021); Toronto Blue Jays (2022–2023); San Francisco Giants (2024–present)

Career highlights and awards
- All-Star (2019); 5× Gold Glove Award (2018, 2019, 2021, 2023, 2024)

Matthew James Chapman (born April 28, 1993) is an American professional baseball third baseman for the San Francisco Giants of Major League Baseball (MLB). He has previously played in MLB for the Oakland Athletics and Toronto Blue Jays.

Chapman made his MLB debut with Oakland in 2017. He was traded to the Blue Jays prior to the 2022 season and signed with the Giants as a free agent before the 2024 season. Renowned for his defense, Chapman has won five Gold Glove Awards, two Platinum Glove Awards, and three Fielding Bible Awards. He also won the Wilson Defensive Player of the Year Award in 2018 and was an All-Star in 2019.

== Early life and career ==
Matthew James Chapman was born on April 28, 1993, in Victorville, California. Chapman attended El Toro High School in Lake Forest, California. In 2011, as a senior, he had a .422 batting average.

Undrafted out of high school in the 2011 MLB draft, Chapman enrolled at California State University, Fullerton, where he played college baseball for the Cal State Fullerton Titans. In 2014, his junior year, he slashed .312/.412/.498 with six home runs and 48 runs batted in (RBIs) in 54 games.

In 2012, Chapman played summer league baseball for the La Crosse Loggers of the Northwoods League.

== Professional career ==
=== Draft and minor leagues ===
After the season, the Oakland Athletics selected Chapman in the first round of the 2014 MLB draft.

After signing, Chapman made his professional debut at the rookie level Arizona League Athletics. After three games, he was promoted to Single–A Beloit Snappers. In 50 games for Beloit, he batted .237 with five home runs and 20 RBI. Chapman also played in one game for the Double–A Midland RockHounds at the end of the season. His entire 2015 season was spent with the High–A Stockton Ports, where he batted .250 with 23 home runs and 57 RBI in 80 games. Chapman was invited to major league spring training with the Athletics in 2016. Chapman began the season with Midland, and after slashing .244/.335/.521 with 29 home runs and 83 RBI over 117 games, he was promoted to the Triple-A Nashville Sounds in August, where he finished the season batting .197 with seven home runs and 13 RBI in 18 games. He was selected as the Texas League Player of the Year for 2016.

Chapman started the 2017 season playing for Nashville. He suffered a wrist injury on a check swing in the first series of the season and spent two weeks on the disabled list. In 49 games for Nashville, he batted .257 with 16 home runs and 30 RBI.

=== Oakland Athletics (2017–2021) ===
The Athletics promoted Chapman to the major leagues on June 15, 2017, to make his MLB debut that night. On June 16, Chapman had his first major league hit and collected three RBIs (including the go-ahead run) against the New York Yankees. On September 6, Chapman was thrown out of a game by umpire Mike Everitt for arguing with Los Angeles Angels catcher Juan Graterol. Chapman took exception to Graterol staring at the Oakland batters, and Graterol felt that the Athletics were trying to steal signs. He spent the remainder of the season with Oakland after his June 15 call-up, batting .234 with 14 home runs and 40 RBIs in 84 games.

Chapman was placed on the disabled list on June 16, 2018, with a bruised right thumb and activated on July 3. Chapman finished his 2018 campaign batting .278 with 24 home runs and 68 RBIs, offering solid baserunning and excellent defense as well. He underwent ulnar sided sesamoid bone excision surgery on the thumb on October 16 in Los Angeles. On October 29, Chapman received a Fielding Bible Award. On November 4, Chapman received a Rawlings Gold Glove Award as well as winning the Rawlings Platinum Glove Award with his former high school teammate Nolan Arenado. He also won the fan vote for the Platinum Glove Award. On December 14, 2018, Chapman underwent left shoulder surgery.

In 2019, Chapman excelled offensively, hitting 36 home runs with 91 RBI and .249/.342/.506 slash line in 156 games. He also struck out 147 times in 583 at bats.

In 2020, Chapman batted .232/.276/.535 with 10 home runs and 25 RBIs, striking out 54 times in 142 at bats. He last played on September 6 due to hip tendonitis. On September 12, 2020, Chapman decided to opt out for the remainder of the season due to hip tendonitis that would require surgery. He underwent labrum surgery that month, ending his season.

In 2021, Chapman batted .210/.314/.403 with 27 home runs and 72 RBIs in 151 games. He became the first Athletic to ever strike out 200 times in a season and had the lowest line drive percentage of any major leaguer, at 14.6%. He also took more pitches per plate appearance than any other MLB batter, at 4.29. He received his third career Gold Glove Award.

=== Toronto Blue Jays (2022–2023) ===
On March 16, 2022, the Athletics traded Chapman to the Toronto Blue Jays for Gunnar Hoglund, Kevin Smith, Zach Logue, and Kirby Snead. On March 22, 2022, Chapman signed a two-year contract worth $25 million with the Blue Jays, avoiding salary arbitration.

Chapman hit his first career grand slam off of Reid Detmers in a 12–11 road victory against the Los Angeles Angels on April 9, 2023. He was named the AL Player of the Month for April after leading all hitters in OPS (1.152), wRC+ (219) and fWAR (2.0). He became a free agent following the season.

=== San Francisco Giants (2024–present) ===
On March 3, 2024, Chapman signed a one-year, $18 million contract with the San Francisco Giants that also included player options for the 2025 and 2026 seasons and a mutual option for the 2027 season. On September 4, Chapman signed a six-year, $151 million contract extension.

Throughout the 2025 season, Chapman had multiple stays on the injured list due to right-hand inflammation. On August 28, 2025, Chapman hit his 200th career home run off Chicago Cubs pitcher Jordan Wicks in the seventh inning in a 12-3 victory. On September 26, Chapman hit his 1,000th hit when he hit a line drive single to center field in the fifth inning as the Giants defeated the Colorado Rockies 6-3.

On June 5, 2026, Chapman recorded a career-high eight RBI in an 18–3 win over the Chicago Cubs. On June 10, Chapman hit two solo home runs, alongside an RBI double as the Giants came back from a 9-1 deficit to defeat the Washington Nationals, 11–10.

== Player profile ==
Chapman has a reputation for being an elite defender with exceptional range, arm strength, and arm accuracy. His arm strength allows him to play at a deeper depth to field a hard-hit ball heading down his right side. He uses a two-handed gather on the forehand, and one-handed backhand with a basketball defensive crouch to prevent the ball from sailing.

== Personal life ==
His former El Toro High School teammate is fellow MLB third baseman Nolan Arenado.

During the off-season, Chapman was roommates with Philadelphia Phillies catcher Garrett Stubbs in California.

Chapman and his wife, Taylor, were married in Cabo San Lucas, Mexico in December 2021. They welcomed a daughter, Gia, on September 19, 2024.

Chapman has Tourette syndrome.
