= Zach Jackson (pitcher, born 1994) =

American baseball player (born 1994)

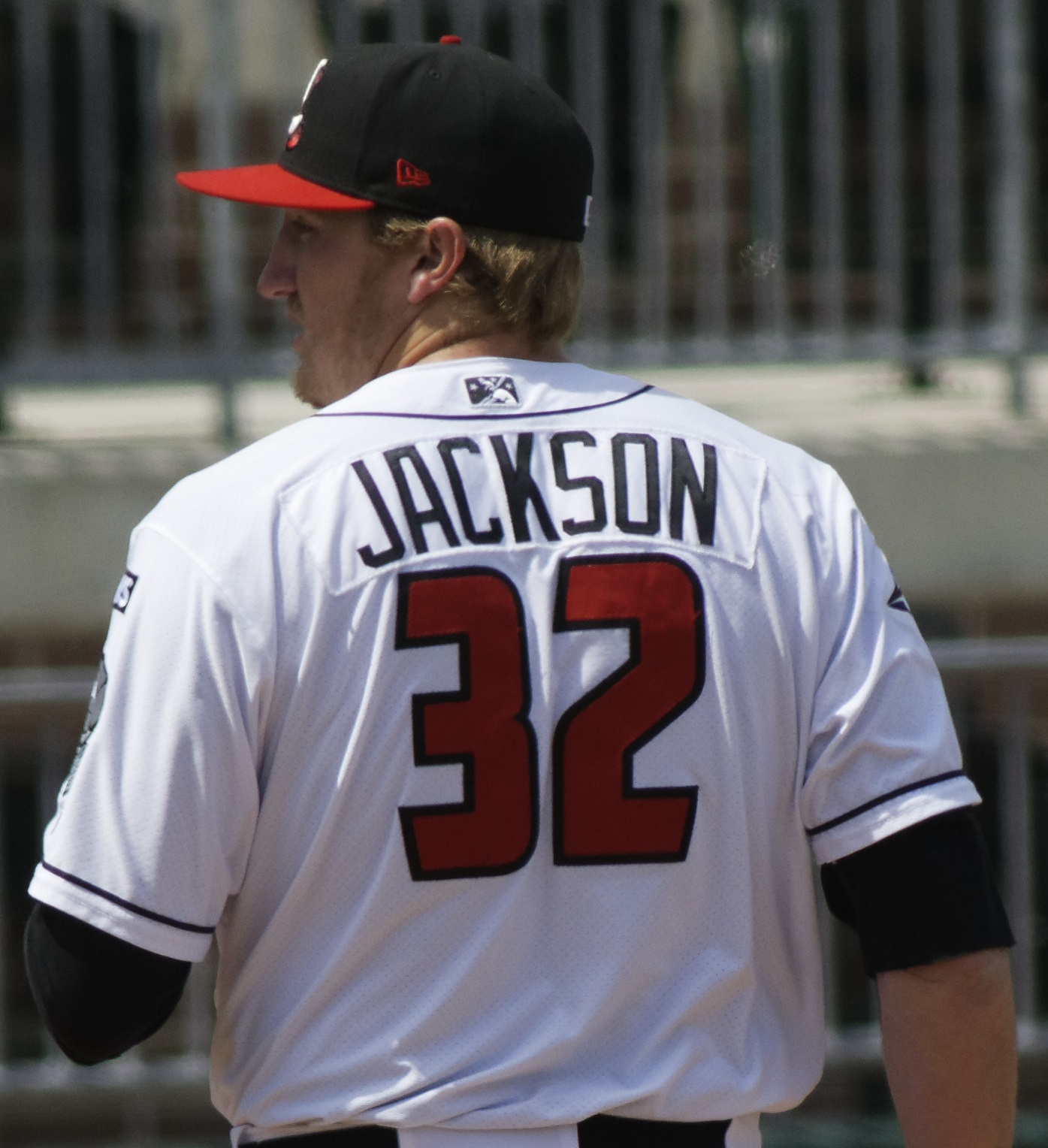
- Jackson with the Lansing Lugnuts in 2017
- Pitcher
- Born: December 25, 1994 (age 31); Tulsa, Oklahoma, U.S.
- Batted: Right Threw: Right

MLB debut
- April 9, 2022, for the Oakland Athletics

Last MLB appearance
- May 16, 2023, for the Oakland Athletics

MLB statistics
- Win–loss record: 4–4
- Earned run average: 2.86
- Strikeouts: 90
- Stats at Baseball Reference

Teams
- Oakland Athletics (2022–2023)

Zachary Garrett Jackson (born December 25, 1994) is an American former professional baseball pitcher. He played in Major League Baseball (MLB) for the Oakland Athletics. The Toronto Blue Jays selected Jackson in the third round of the 2016 MLB draft, and made his MLB debut in 2022.

== High school and college ==
Jackson attended Berryhill High School in his hometown of Tulsa, Oklahoma. In his final high school season, he was named a second-team All-American by Baseball America after pitching to a 13–1 win–loss record, 0.38 earned run average (ERA), and 147 strikeouts in 72 2/3 innings. Jackson graduated with a 4.0 grade point average, and was the valedictorian of his class.

He then attended the University of Arkansas, where he played three seasons for the Arkansas Razorbacks. In his freshman season, Jackson posted a 2.53 ERA and 42 strikeouts in 42 2/3 innings. Jackson made 27 relief appearances as a sophomore in 2015, and went 5–1 with a 2.10 ERA, 89 strikeouts, and nine saves in 60 innings pitched. His performance earned him a spot on the All-SEC First Team, as well as a position on the Collegiate National Team. In his final year with the Razorbacks, Jackson pitched as both a starter and reliever, and posted a 3–4 record with a 5.09 ERA, 66 strikeouts, and four saves.

Jackson played collegiate summer baseball for the Wisconsin Rapids Rafters in 2014.

== Professional career ==
=== Toronto Blue Jays ===
The Toronto Blue Jays selected Jackson in the third round of the 2016 Major League Baseball draft. He signed for a $275,000 bonus and was assigned to the Rookie-level Gulf Coast League Blue Jays. After one appearance in the GCL, Jackson was promoted to the Low-A Vancouver Canadians of the Northwest League, where he ended the season. Jackson made 14 relief appearances in 2016, and went 1–1 with a 3.38 ERA and 23 strikeouts in 18 2/3 innings. He was assigned to the Single-A Lansing Lugnuts to begin the 2017 season, and was promoted to the High-A Dunedin Blue Jays in June. Jackson finished the season with a 2–2 record, 2.47 ERA, and 68 strikeouts in 51 innings.

Jackson spent the 2018 season with the Double–A New Hampshire Fisher Cats, for whom he made 43 appearances out of the bullpen, recording a 2.47 ERA with 75 strikeouts across 62 innings pitched. In 2019, he played for the Triple–A Buffalo Bisons, appearing in 46 games and posting a 3.97 ERA with 68 strikeouts in 68 innings of work. Jackson did not play in a game in 2020 due to the cancellation of the minor league season because of the COVID-19 pandemic.

=== Oakland Athletics ===
On December 10, 2020, Jackson was selected by the Oakland Athletics in the minor league phase of the Rule 5 draft. He split the 2021 campaign between the Double-A Midland RockHounds and Triple-A Las Vegas Aviators, accumulating a 2-2 record and 2.57 ERA with 47 strikeouts and six saves across 25 relief outings.

On April 7, 2022, the Athletics selected Jackson's contract, adding him to their Opening Day roster. Jackson made 54 appearances for Oakland during his rookie campaign, compiling a 2-3 record and 3.00 ERA with 67 strikeouts and three saves over 48 innings of work.

In 2023, Jackson posted a 2.50 ERA in 19 appearances out of Oakland's bullpen before he was placed on the injured list with a right flexor tendon strain on May 19, 2023. He was transferred to the 60-day injured list on June 21.

Jackson was optioned to Triple–A Las Vegas to begin the 2024 season. He was designated for assignment following the acquisition of Alex Speas on April 6, 2024. Jackson cleared waivers and was sent outright to Las Vegas on April 10. In 35 appearances for the Aviators, he struggled to a 5-6 record and 7.08 ERA with 43 strikeouts across 34 1/3 innings pitched. Jackson elected free agency following the season on November 4.

On January 16, 2025, Jackson announced his retirement from professional baseball.
