= Christian Lopes =

American baseball player (born 1992)

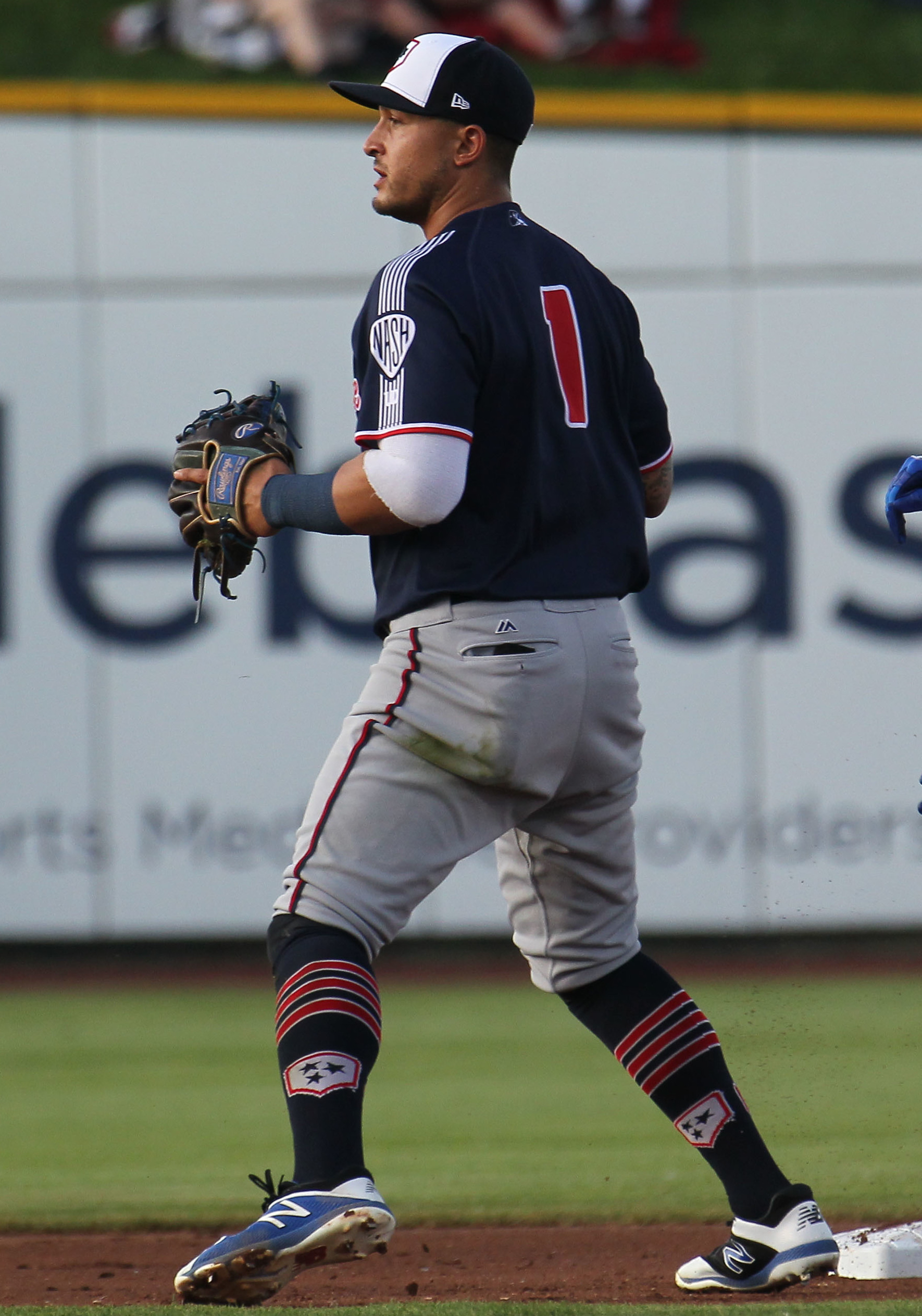
- Lopes with the Nashville Sounds in 2019
- Infielder
- Born: October 1, 1992 (age 33); Huntington Beach, California, U.S.
- Batted: Right Threw: Right

MLB debut
- April 20, 2022, for the Oakland Athletics

Last MLB appearance
- April 26, 2022, for the Oakland Athletics

MLB statistics
- Batting average: .000
- Home runs: 0
- Runs batted in: 0
- Stats at Baseball Reference

Teams
- Oakland Athletics (2022)

Christian Michael Lopes (born October 1, 1992) is an American former professional baseball infielder. He played in Major League Baseball (MLB) for the Oakland Athletics.

== Amateur career ==
In 2006, Lopes was named the Under-13 National Baseball Player of the Year by Baseball America. He played for the United States national baseball team in the 2010 World Junior Baseball Championship. Lopes attended Valencia High School in Santa Clarita, California, for two years. As a sophomore, Lopes batted .453 with 15 home runs and 33 runs batted in (RBIs). He was named the Santa Clarita Valley Player of the Year and the Foothill League's most valuable player. His family moved and he transferred to Edison High School in Huntington Beach, California. He committed to attend the University of Southern California.

== Career ==
=== Toronto Blue Jays ===
The Toronto Blue Jays selected Lopes in the seventh round of the 2011 MLB draft. He split the 2012 season between the Bluefield Blue Jays and the Vancouver Canadians, hitting a combined .278/.339/.462 with four home runs and 33 RBI. He played for the Lansing Lugnuts in 2013, hitting .245/.308/.336 with five home runs and 66 RBI. He spent the 2014 season with the Dunedin Blue Jays, hitting .243/.329/.350 with 3 home runs and 33 RBI. He split the 2015 season between Dunedin and the New Hampshire Fisher Cats, hitting a combined .260/.339/.325 with two home runs and 38 RBI. In 2016, he again split the season between Dunedin and New Hampshire, hitting .283/.353/.402 with six home runs and 56 RBI. In 2017, he split the season between the Gulf Goast League Blue Jays, Dunedin, and the Buffalo Bisons of the Triple–A International League, hitting a combined .269/.357/.421 with seven home runs and 46 RBI. Lopes elected free agency following the season on November 6, 2017.

=== Texas Rangers ===
On December 4, 2017, Lopes signed a minor league contract with the Texas Rangers. He played for the Round Rock Express of the Triple–A Pacific Coast League in 2018, hitting .261/.365/.408 with 12 home runs and 52 RBI. He split the 2019 season between the Double–A Frisco RoughRiders and the Triple–A Nashville Sounds, hitting a combined .265/.356/.422 with 13 home runs and 65 RBI. Lopes elected free agency following the season on November 4, 2019.

=== Miami Marlins ===
On December 18, 2019, Lopes signed a minor league contract with the Miami Marlins. Lopes did not play in a game in 2020 due to the cancellation of the minor league season because of the COVID-19 pandemic. He was released by the team on September 1, 2020.

=== Arizona Diamondbacks ===
On October 14, 2020, Lopes signed a minor league deal with the Arizona Diamondbacks. Lopes spent the 2021 season with the Triple-A Reno Aces. Lopes played in 66 games, hitting .271 with nine home runs and 34 RBI. He became a free agent following the 2021 season.

=== Oakland Athletics ===
On March 11, 2022, Lopes signed a minor league contract with the Oakland Athletics. He began the season with the Las Vegas Aviators. On April 18, Lopes was added to the Athletics roster as a COVID-19 related substitute. He made his MLB debut on April 20. Lopes went hitless in nine at-bats with a walk for Oakland before he was removed from the 40-man roster and returned to Triple-A on April 27. He was released by the Athletics organization on August 2.

In October 2022, he joined the Brazil national team for 2023 World Baseball Classic qualifiers.

On July 19, 2023, Lopes announced on his Instagram that he was retired from professional baseball and had become a real estate agent.

== Personal life ==
His brother, Tim, is also a professional baseball player. Lopes is married and is expecting his first child with his wife, Ashley.
