= Adrián Martínez (baseball) =

Mexican baseball player (born 1996)

Dorados de Chihuahua – No. 70
- Pitcher
- Born: December 10, 1996 (age 29); Mexicali, Baja California, Mexico
- Bats: Right Throws: Right

MLB debut
- May 10, 2022, for the Oakland Athletics

MLB statistics (through 2023 season)
- Win–loss record: 4–8
- Earned run average: 5.51
- Strikeouts: 100
- Stats at Baseball Reference

Teams
- Oakland Athletics (2022–2023)
Medals
Men's baseball
Representing Mexico
World Baseball Classic
Bronze medal – third place	2023 Miami	Team

Adrián Misael Martínez (born December 10, 1996) is a Mexican professional baseball pitcher for the Dorados de Chihuahua of the Mexican League. He has previously played in Major League Baseball (MLB) for the Oakland Athletics.

== Career ==
=== San Diego Padres ===
Martínez signed with the San Diego Padres as an international free agent on February 16, 2015. He spent the 2015 season with the Dominican Summer League Padres, recording a 4.41 ERA with 19 strikeouts over 16 1/3 innings. He missed 2016 after undergoing Tommy John surgery. He returned in 2017 with the Arizona League Padres, going 2–3 with a 4.50 ERA and 37 strikeouts over 30 innings. He split the 2018 season between the Fort Wayne TinCaps of the Single–A Midwest League and the Tri-City Dust Devils of the Low–A Northwest League, combining to go 4–6 with a 6.90 ERA and 78 strikeouts over 74 1/3 innings. He split the 2019 season between Fort Wayne and the Lake Elsinore Storm of the High–A California League, going a combined 7–4 with a 3.22 ERA and 76 strikeouts over 81 innings. Martínez did not play in a game in 2020 due to the cancelation of the minor league season because of the COVID-19 pandemic. He opened the 2021 season with the San Antonio Missions of the Double-A Central, going 7–3 with a 2.34 ERA and 83 strikeouts over 80 2/3 innings. He was then promoted to the El Paso Chihuahuas of the Triple-A West league. Over 9 games for El Paso, Martínez went 1–2 with a 5.28 ERA and 39 strikeouts over 44 1/3 innings.

On November 7, 2021, Martínez was selected to San Diego's 40-man roster in order to be protected from the Rule 5 draft.

=== Oakland Athletics ===
On April 3, 2022, the Padres traded Martínez, along with Euribiel Angeles, to the Oakland Athletics for Sean Manaea. He opened the 2022 season with the Las Vegas Aviators. On May 10, he was promoted to the active roster to make his MLB debut. He made his MLB debut that day, earning his first career victory with 5.1 shutout innings against the Detroit Tigers.

Martínez was optioned to Triple-A Las Vegas to begin the 2023 season. He made 22 appearances for Oakland in 2023, posting a 4.75 ERA with 47 strikeouts across 55.0 innings pitched.

During spring training in 2024, Martínez surrendered four runs in 1 1/3 innings, and was optioned to Triple–A Las Vegas to begin the season as a result. On March 31, 2024, he was designated for assignment following the waiver claim of Tyler Nevin. Martínez cleared waivers and was sent outright to Las Vegas on April 3. He was released by the Athletics organization on July 29.

=== Dorados de Chihuahua ===
On July 1, 2026, following two years of inactivity Martínez signed with the Dorados de Chihuahua of the Mexican League.
