= Gunnar Hoglund =

American baseball player (born 1999)

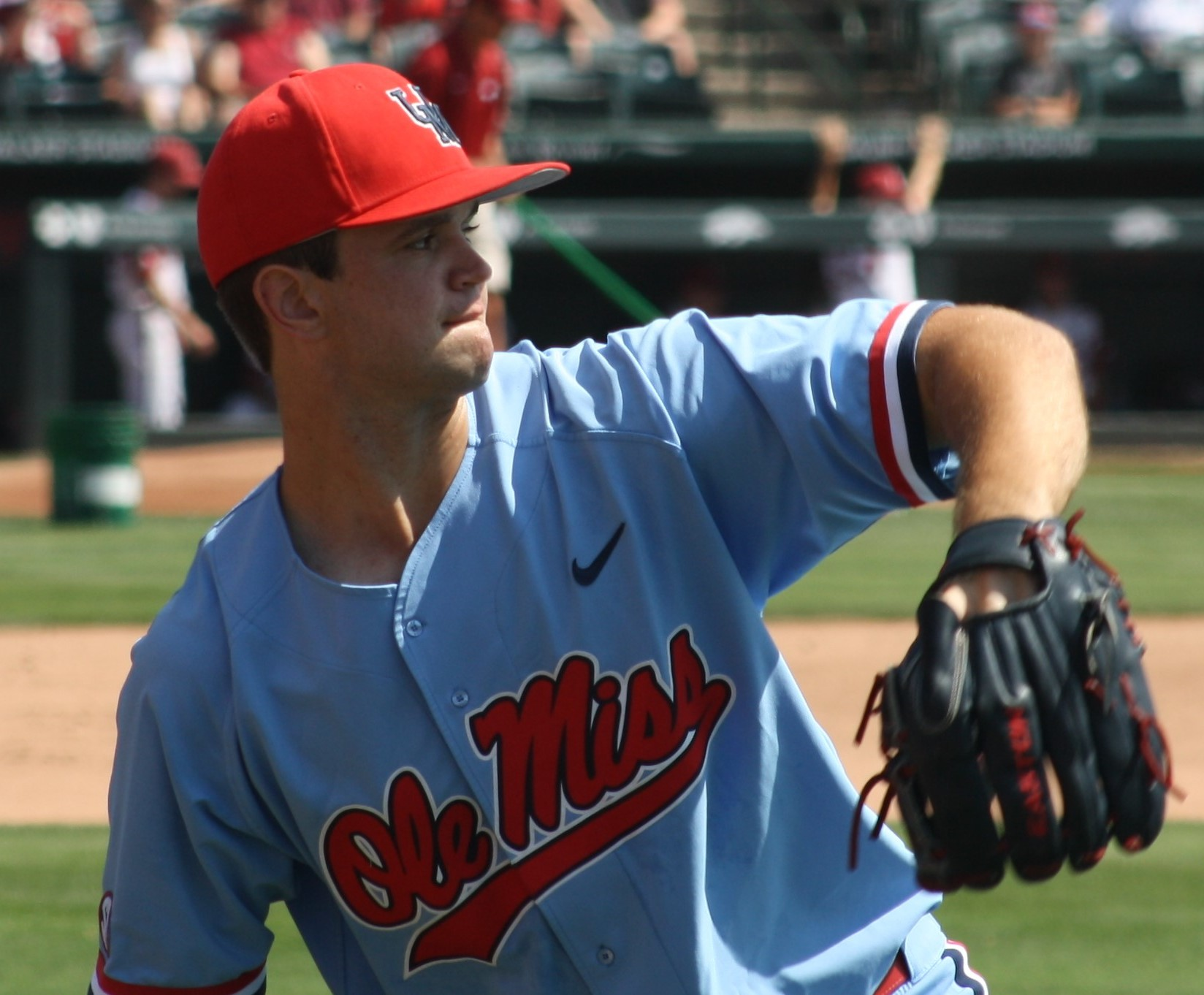
- Hoglund with the Ole Miss Rebels in 2019

Athletics – No. 53
- Pitcher
- Born: December 17, 1999 (age 26); Dunedin, Florida, U.S.
- Bats: Left Throws: Right

MLB debut
- May 2, 2025, for the Athletics

MLB statistics (through 2025 season)
- Win–loss record: 1–3
- Earned run average: 6.40
- Strikeouts: 23
- Stats at Baseball Reference

Teams
- Athletics (2025)

Gunnar Thomas Hoglund (born December 17, 1999) is an American professional baseball pitcher for the Athletics of Major League Baseball (MLB). Hoglund played college baseball for the Ole Miss Rebels and made his MLB debut in 2025.

== Amateur career ==
Hoglund graduated from Dayspring Academy in Port Richey, Florida, but since they do not offer any athletic teams, he played baseball for Fivay High School in Hudson, Florida. As a senior in 2018, he had a 7–0 win–loss record with a 0.27 earned run average (ERA). Hoglund also played basketball for Fivay and averaged 10.9 points and 11.3 rebounds a game. He was selected 36th overall by the Pittsburgh Pirates in the 2018 Major League Baseball draft, but did not sign and instead chose to enroll at the University of Mississippi and play college baseball for the Ole Miss Rebels.

In 2019, Hoglund's freshman year at Ole Miss, he appeared in 17 games (with 16 games started), going 3–3 with a 5.29 ERA, striking out 53 and walking 14 in 68 innings pitched. As a sophomore in 2020, he went 3–0 with a 1.16 ERA and 37 strikeouts over 23 1/3 innings before the season was ended due to the COVID-19 pandemic. On May 11, 2021, it was announced that Hoglund would require Tommy John surgery, thus ending his junior season prematurely. Over 11 starts, he pitched 62 2/3 innings, striking out 96 batters while going 4–2 with a 2.87 ERA.

== Professional career ==
=== Toronto Blue Jays ===
The Toronto Blue Jays selected Hoglund in the first round, with the 19th overall selection, in the 2021 Major League Baseball draft. He signed with the Blue Jays for a $3.2 million signing bonus, forgoing his senior year of college baseball.

=== Oakland Athletics / Athletics ===
On March 16, 2022, the Blue Jays traded Hoglund, Kevin Smith, Zach Logue, and Kirby Snead to the Oakland Athletics in exchange for Matt Chapman. Hoglund made his professional debut in mid-July while on a rehab start with the rookie–level Arizona Complex League Athletics before being assigned to the Single–A Stockton Ports after two games. He pitched a total of eight innings between the two teams and gave up no earned runs. Hoglund opened the 2023 season with Stockton and was promoted to the High–A Lansing Lugnuts and Double–A Midland RockHounds during the season. Over 16 starts between the three teams, he went 2-5 with a 6.05 ERA and 46 strikeouts over 61 innings.

Hoglund split the 2024 campaign between Midland and the Triple–A Las Vegas Aviators, compiling a 9–7 record and 3.44 ERA with 119 strikeouts across 130 2/3 innings pitched. On November 19, 2024, the Athletics added Hoglund to their 40-man roster to protect him from the Rule 5 draft.

Hoglund was optioned to Triple-A Las Vegas to begin the 2025 season. He compiled a 1–2 record and 2.43 ERA with 30 strikeouts across 29 2/3 innings pitched for Las Vegas. On May 2, 2025, Hoglund was promoted to the major leagues for the first time. He made his major debut against the Miami Marlins, where he earned his first career win after pitching six innings and allowing six hits and one run with seven strikeouts. In six starts for the Athletics during his rookie campaign, Hoglund logged a 1-3 record and 6.40 ERA with 23 strikeouts across 32 1/3 innings pitched. On June 1, he was placed on the injured list due to a left hip impingement. On June 13, it was announced that Hoglund would miss the remainder of the season after undergoing hip surgery.

Hoglund was placed on the injured list to begin the 2026 season, due to a lumbar spine strain. He was transferred to the 60-day injured list on April 7, 2026. On May 19, Hoglund underwent a season-ending labral surgery and cartilage debridement for his left hip to address femoroacetabular impingement.
