= Sam Moll =

American baseball player (born 1992)

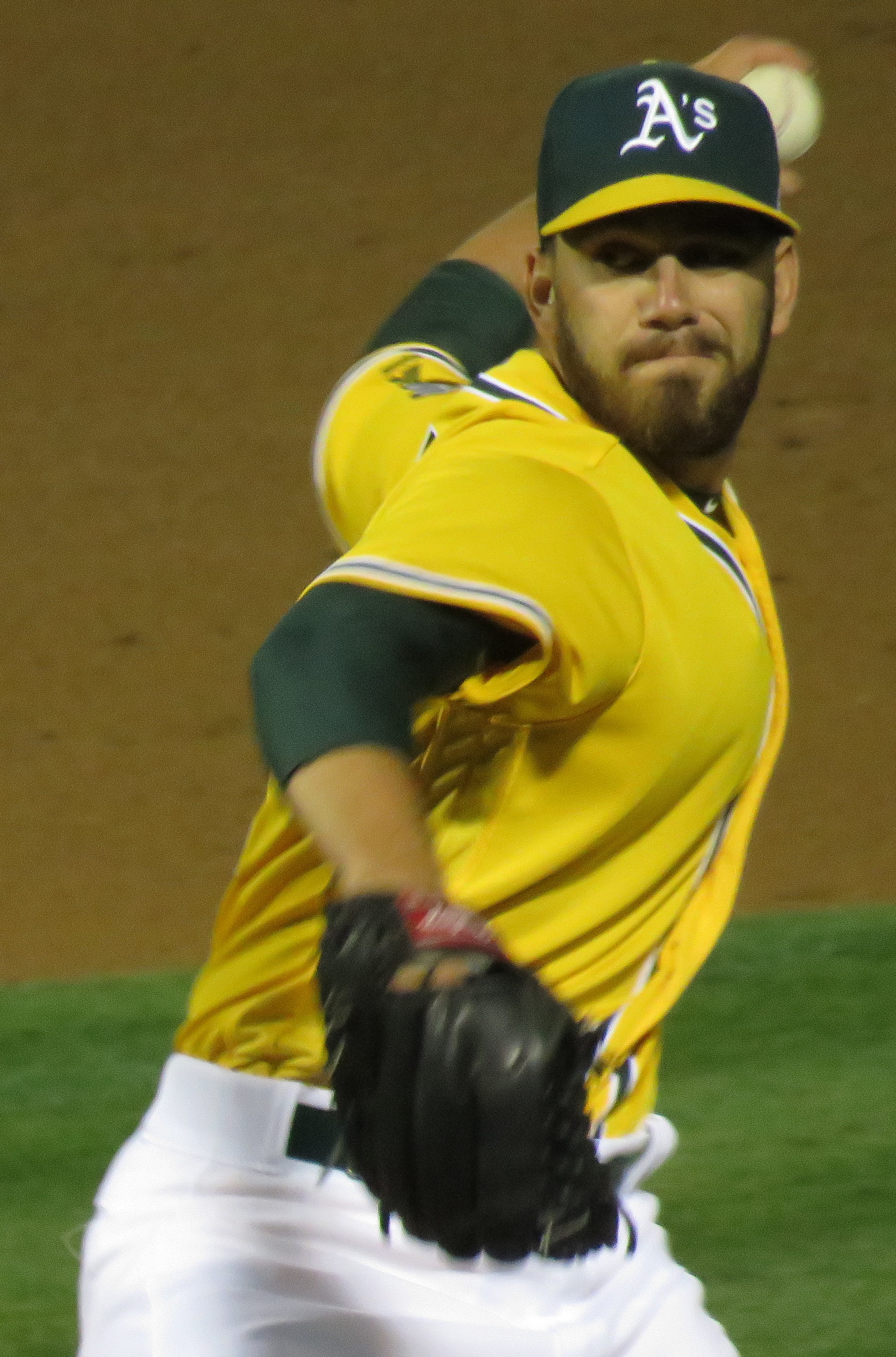
- Moll pitching for the Oakland Athletics in 2017

Free agent
- Pitcher
- Born: January 3, 1992 (age 34); Lakeland, Tennessee, U.S.
- Bats: Left Throws: Left

MLB debut
- September 1, 2017, for the Oakland Athletics

MLB statistics (through September 4, 2026)
- Win–loss record: 10–13
- Earned run average: 3.98
- Strikeouts: 245
- Stats at Baseball Reference

Teams
- Oakland Athletics (2017, 2021–2023); Cincinnati Reds (2023–2026)

Samuel John Moll (born January 3, 1992) is an American professional baseball pitcher who is a free agent. He has previously played in Major League Baseball (MLB) for the Oakland Athletics and Cincinnati Reds. The Colorado Rockies selected Moll in the third round of the 2013 MLB draft. He made his MLB debut in 2017 with the Athletics.

== Career ==
=== Amateur ===
Moll attended St. Benedict at Auburndale High School in Cordova, Tennessee. He enrolled at the University of Memphis and played college baseball for the Memphis Tigers. In 2012, he played collegiate summer baseball with the Brewster Whitecaps of the Cape Cod Baseball League.

=== Colorado Rockies ===
The Colorado Rockies selected Moll in the third round of the 2013 Major League Baseball draft. He made his professional debut with the Low-A Tri-City Dust Devils, posting a 1.80 ERA in 30 innings pitched. In July, Moll combined with three other pitchers to throw a no-hitter. He returned to Tri-City in 2014 and appeared in only nine games due to injury. In 2015, he pitched for both the High-A Modesto Nuts and the Double-A New Britain Rock Cats, where he posted a combined 2.63 ERA with 74 strikeouts in 68 1/3 innings pitched between both clubs. After the season, he pitched in the Arizona Fall League, where he gave up four earned runs in seven innings. Moll spent 2016 with the Triple-A Albuquerque Isotopes, where he posted a 3–5 record with a 4.94 ERA. The Rockies added him to their 40–man roster after the season. Moll began the 2017 season with Albuquerque, but was designated for assignment on August 11, 2017.

=== Oakland Athletics ===
On August 16, 2017, Moll was traded to the Oakland Athletics in exchange for a player to be named later or cash considerations. Oakland optioned him to the Triple-A Nashville Sounds upon his acquisition.

The Athletics promoted Moll to the major leagues on September 1, 2017, and he made his major league debut that night. He made 11 appearances for Oakland during his rookie campaign, recording a 10.80 ERA with seven strikeouts across 6 2/3 innings of work. Moll was designated for assignment after the season on November 20.

=== Toronto Blue Jays ===
On November 27, 2017, Moll was claimed off waivers by the Pittsburgh Pirates. After being designated for assignment by Pittsburgh, the Seattle Mariners claimed Moll off waivers on November 30.

On March 17, 2018, Moll was claimed off waivers by the Toronto Blue Jays. He was designated for assignment on March 29, and was assigned outright to the Triple-A Buffalo Bisons after clearing waivers on March 31. In 15 games with Buffalo, Moll logged a 1-3 record and 5.30 ERA.

=== San Francisco Giants ===
On December 13, 2018, in the Winter Meetings, the San Francisco Giants selected Moll from the Blue Jays in the minor league phase of the Rule 5 draft. He was assigned to the Double-A Richmond Flying Squirrels to start the 2019 season, and also pitched for the Triple-A Sacramento River Cats. Between the two teams in 2019, he was 2–2 with two saves and a 2.39 ERA in 41 relief appearances covering 49 innings in which he struck out 54 batters. Moll elected free agency following the season on November 4.

Moll re-signed with the Giants on a minor league contract on January 6, 2020. Moll did not play in a game in 2020 due to the cancellation of the minor league season because of the COVID-19 pandemic. Moll became a free agent on November 2.

=== Arizona Diamondbacks ===
On November 17, 2020, Moll signed a minor league contract with the Arizona Diamondbacks organization. Moll was assigned to the Triple-A Reno Aces to begin the 2021 season. In 21 appearances with Reno, Moll recorded a 5.82 ERA with 30 strikeouts and 15 walks in 21 2/3 innings of work.

=== Oakland Athletics (second stint) ===
On July 2, 2021, Moll was traded to the Oakland Athletics organization in exchange for cash considerations. The following day, Moll was selected to the active roster. On July 17, Moll made his first appearance with Oakland in 2021, and first MLB appearance since 2017, pitching a scoreless inning against the Cleveland Indians. In eight total appearances for the Athletics, he recorded a 3.48 ERA with eight strikeouts.

Moll made 53 appearances out of the bullpen for Oakland during the 2022 season, compiling a 2–1 record and 2.91 ERA with 46 strikeouts across 43 1/3 innings pitched. Moll pitched in 45 games for Oakland in 2023, posting an 0–3 record and 4.54 ERA with 46 strikeouts and one save.

=== Cincinnati Reds ===
On July 31, 2023, Moll was traded to the Cincinnati Reds in exchange for Joe Boyle. He made 25 appearances down the stretch for Cincinnati, recording an 0.73 ERA with 22 strikeouts over 24 2/3 innings of relief.

Moll recorded 48 relief appearances for Cincinnati in 2024, logging a 3–2 record and 3.35 ERA with 38 strikeouts across 37 2/3 innings pitched. He pitched in 16 games for the Reds during the 2025 campaign, but struggled to a 6.38 ERA with 22 strikeouts over 18 1/3 innings pitched.

Moll made 65 appearances for Cincinnati in 2026, compiling a 2–7 record and 4.79 ERA with 56 strikeouts and one save across 56 1/3 innings pitched. On September 6, 2026, Moll was designated for assignment by the Reds. Two days later, Moll rejected the outright assignment and elected free agency.

== See also ==
- Rule 5 draft results
