= CHHS =

CHHS is a four-letter acronym, and may refer to:

== Schools ==
=== Australia ===
- Camden Haven High School, Laurieton, New South Wales
- Castle Hill High School, Castle Hill, New South Wales
- Chester Hill High School, Chester Hill, New South Wales
- Coffs Harbour High School, Coffs Harbour, New South Wales

=== Canada ===
- Crescent Heights High School (Calgary, Alberta)
- Crescent Heights High School (Medicine Hat), Alberta

=== Cayman Islands ===
- Clifton Hunter High School

=== Turks and Caicos (UK) ===
- Clement Howell High School, Providenciales

=== United Kingdom ===
- Cheadle Hulme High School, Cheadle Hulme, Stockport, England

=== United States ===
- Calaveras Hills High School, Milpitas, California
- Cape Henlopen High School, Lewes, Delaware
- Chancellor High School, Fredericksburg, Virginia
- Chapel Hill High School (Chapel Hill, North Carolina)
- Charles Henderson High School, Charles Henderson, Alabama
- Chino Hills High School, Chino Hills, California
- Cleveland Heights High School, Cleveland Heights, Ohio
- Clover Hill High School, Midlothian, Virginia
- Colleyville Heritage High School, Colleyville, Texas
- Collins Hill High School, Suwanee, Georgia
- Colonial Heights High School, Colonial Heights, Virginia
- Columbia Heights High School, Minnesota
- Copper Hills High School, West Jordan, Utah
- Croton-Harmon High School, Croton-on-Hudson, New York
- Chartiers Houston High School, Houston, Pennsylvania

== Other ==
- California Health and Human Services Agency
- Center for Health and Homeland Security
- College of Health and Human Sciences at California State University, Stanislaus
