= Panther Field at Colleyville-Heritage =

Baseball park in Colleyville, Texas, US

Coordinates: 32.889103°N 97.102297°W

Panther Field (Colleyville, Texas) is a baseball park located at Colleyville Heritage High School, not to be confused with Panther Field in Duncanville, Texas, and the home of the UIL Colleyville Heritage Panthers baseball team. It was also the home of the TCL Colleyville-Grapevine LoneStars in 2004 and later the Colleyville LoneStars in 2007. Due to financial limitations, the LoneStars existed in nearby Euless for the 2005 and 2006 seasons in between stints in Colleyville.
