= Joseph Hawkins =

Joseph Hawkins may refer to:

- Joseph H. Hawkins (died 1823), U.S. Representative from Kentucky
- Joseph Hawkins (New York politician) (1781–1832), U.S. Representative from New York
- Joseph M. Hawkins (1799-1836), Alamo defender
- Joey Hawkins (born 1981), American football player
- Joe Hawkins (born 2002), Welsh international rugby union player
- Joe Hawkins, character in the TV series Humans
