= 2022 Southeastern Conference softball season =

2022 SEC Softball Season
- League: NCAA Division I
- Sport: Softball
- Teams: 13

Regular Season
- Champions: Arkansas

Tournament
- Champions: Arkansas
- Runners-up: Missouri

Softball seasons
- ← 2021 2023 →

2022 Southeastern Conference softball standings
	Conf.				Overall
Team	W		L	PCT	W		L	PCT
No. 9 Arkansas ‍†‍‡‍^{y}	19	–	5	.792	48	–	11	.814
No. 17 Alabama ‍‍‍^{y}	16	–	8	.667	44	–	13	.772
No. 20 Tennessee ‍‍‍^{y}	15	–	8	.652	41	–	18	.695
No. 5 Florida ‍‍‍^{y}	13	–	11	.542	49	–	19	.721
No. 21 Kentucky ‍‍‍^{y}	13	–	11	.542	37	–	19	.661
LSU ‍‍‍^{y}	13	–	11	.542	34	–	23	.596
No. 23 Missouri ‍‍‍^{y}	12	–	11	.522	38	–	22	.633
No. 22 Georgia ‍‍‍^{y}	12	–	12	.500	43	–	18	.705
Ole Miss ‍‍‍^{y}	12	–	12	.500	41	–	19	.683
No. 24 Auburn ‍‍‍^{y}	11	–	13	.458	40	–	17	.702
No. 19 Mississippi State ‍‍‍^{y}	10	–	14	.417	37	–	27	.578
Texas A&M ‍‍‍^{y}	6	–	18	.250	31	–	28	.525
South Carolina ‍‍‍	3	–	21	.125	26	–	30	.464
† – Conference champion ‡ – Tournament champion y – Invited to the NCAA tournament As of June 9, 2022; Rankings from NFCA/USA Today

The 2022 SEC softball season began play Thursday, February 10, and conference play began on Thursday, March 11. The 2022 Southeastern Conference softball tournament was May 10–14 at Katie Seashole Pressly Softball Stadium in Gainesville, Florida. Arkansas played Missouri in the tournament final, winning by a score of 4–0. Vanderbilt University is the only full member of the Southeastern Conference to not sponsor a softball program.

== SEC preseason poll ==
The head coaches SEC preseason poll was released on January 31, 2022. Each head coach votes on a scale of 12 points for first place down to 1 point for last place, 12th. Each coach only votes for 12 teams, since they can not vote for their own team. Alabama was picked to finish 1st, with seven 1st place votes. Florida was 2nd with three 1st place votes, Arkansas 3rd with three, and Tennessee 4th with the remaining one 1st place votes.

Preseason poll
Predicted finish	Team
1	Alabama
2	Florida
3	Arkansas
4	Tennessee
5	Missouri
6	LSU
7	Georgia
7	Kentucky
9	Ole Miss
10	Texas A&M
11	Auburn
12	Mississippi State
13	South Carolina

== Record vs. conference opponents ==
Date m/dd is for last scheduled game of series. Blank are not scheduled. Blue are home games, otherwise away.

2022 SEC softball records Source: 2022 SEC softball game results, 2022 SEC softball schedule
Team	W–L	ALA	ARK	AUB	FLA	UGA	KEN	LSU	MSU	MIZZ	MISS	SCAR	TENN	TAMU	Team	SR	SW
ALA	16–8		.	.	2–1	2–1	2–1	1–2	3–0	2–1	.	3–0	.	1–2	ALA	6–2	2–0
ARK	19–5	.		3–0	3–0	.	2–1	2–1	.	.	2–1	3–0	2–1	2–1	ARK	8–0	3–0
AUB	11–13	.	0–3		1–2	2–1	1–2	.	2–1	.	.	2–1	0–3	3–0	AUB	4–4	1–2
FLA	13–11	1–2	0–3	2–1		.	.	2–1	2–1	.	3–0	.	1–2	2–1	FLA	5–3	1–1
UGA	12–12	1–2	.	1–2	.		.	1–2	.	2–1	1–2	2–1	2–1	2–1	UGA	4–4	0–0
KEN	13–11	1–2	1–2	2–1	.	.		3–0	2–1	0–3	2–1	2–1	.	.	KEN	5–3	1–1
LSU	13–11	2–1	1–2	.	1–2	2–1	0–3		2–1	.	.	3–0	.	2–1	LSU	5–3	1–1
MSU	10–14	0–3	.	1–2	1–2	.	1–2	1–2		2–1	3–0	.	1–2	.	MSU	2–6	1–1
MIZZ	12–11	1–2	.	.	.	1–2	3–0	.	1–2		0–3	3–0	0–2	3–0	MIZZ	3–5	2–1
MISS	12–12	.	1–2	.	0–3	2–1	1–2	.	0–3	3–0		3–0	2–1	.	MISS	4–4	2–2
SCAR	3–21	0–3	0–3	1–2	.	1–2	1–2	0–3	.	0–3	0–3		.	.	SCAR	0–8	0–5
TENN	15–8	.	1–2	3–0	2–1	1–2	.	.	2–1	2–0	1–2	.		3–0	TENN	5–3	2–0
TAMU	6–18	2–1	1–2	0–3	1–2	1–2	.	1–2	.	0–3	.	.	0–3		TAMU	1–7	0–3
Team	W–L	ALA	ARK	AUB	FLA	UGA	KEN	LSU	MSU	MIZZ	MISS	SCAR	TENN	TAMU	Team	SR	SW

Updated for entire regular season. Tiebrkrs: KEN&FLA>LSU KEN>FLA hd–hd. MISS>UGA hd–hd.

== National rankings ==
In the final rankings the Southeastern Conference had 8 or 9 teams ranked in the top 25 in three of the major polls. Of the 13 teams in the SEC, 12 went to the NCAA tournament.

- Florida went up in the rankings to become the highest ranked SEC team. Florida lost to the number 1 seed Arkansas in the 2022 SEC softball tournament semifinal, but was the only SEC team to make the Women's College World Series (WCWS) where they went 1–2.
- Arkansas dropped in the polls, after winning the SEC tournament, but losing in their Super Regional, falling just short of the WCWS.
- Alabama dropped 9 or 10 places in the final polls, losing their only game in the SEC tournament and was eliminated in their NCAA tournament Regional falling just short of a Super Regional.
- Mississippi State rose in the rankings from being unranked, going 1–1 in the SEC tournament and winning a Regional in the NCAA tournament.
- Tennessee dropped in the rankings, going 1–1 in the SEC tournament and also losing their Super Regional.
- Kentucky lost their only SEC tournament game, and lost a Regional.
- Georgia dropped 4 or less in the polls.
- Missouri finished 22nd or 23rd, having made the finals of the SEC tournament and going 1–2 in a Regional.
- Auburn dropped in the polls, going 0–1 in the SEC tournament, and 1–2 in a Regional.
- LSU, going 0–1 in the SEC tournament and 0–2 in a Regional, dropped out of all three rankings.
- Ole Miss, going 1–1 in the SEC Tournament and 2–2 in a Regional, dropped out of all three rankings.
- Texas A&M also lost a Regional.
- South Carolina did not play in the NCAA tournament.

=== NFCA/USA Today ===
See 2022 NCAA Division I softball rankings#NFCA/USA Today also.

Week	0	1	2	3	4	5	6	7	8	9	10	11	12	13	14	15	
FLA	6	4	4	4	4	5	6	7	7	9	8	9	10	12	12	5	FLA
ARK	8	10	10	11	12	12	10	10	10	7	7	7	5	4	4	9	ARK
ALA	2	2	2	2	2	3	4	4	5	3	2	5	6	5	7	17	ALA
MSU	–	–	–	–	–	–	–	–	–	–	–	–	–	–	–	19	MSU
TENN	22	18	17	18	18	15	15	13	12	15	15	13	14	13	13	20	TENN
KEN	19	16	12	10	9	8	8	8	8	8	9	11	13	14	15	21	KEN
UGA	12	13	15	16	15	16	17	15	15	14	14	15	16	18	19	22	UGA
MIZZ	11	17	16	15	14	18	21	24	24	–	–	–	24	24	20	23	MIZZ
AUB	–	–	21	20	20	19	18	17	17	19	18	16	15	17	17	24	AUB
LSU	14	21	24	22	21	20	22	20	21	21	21	19	19	20	22	–	LSU
MISS	–	–	–	–	–	–	–	–	–	–	–	–	–	–	–	–	MISS
SCAR	–	–	–	–	–	–	–	–	–	–	–	–	–	–	–	–	SCAR
TAMU	–	–	–	–	–	–	–	–	–	–	–	–	–	–	–	–	TAMU

=== D1Softball ===
See 2022 NCAA Division I softball rankings#D1Softball also.

Week	0	1	2	3	4	5	6	7	8	9	10	11	12	13	14	
FLA	5	3	3	3	3	5	6	7	8	10	10	11	12	13	5	FLA
ARK	8	9	8	8	8	8	9	10	10	6	6	5	4	4	8	ARK
MSU	–	–	–	–	–	–	–	–	–	–	–	–	–	–	17	MSU
ALA	2	2	2	2	2	4	4	4	5	2	2	7	8	6	18	ALA
KEN	20	18	15	14	14	13	12	12	11	12	13	14	15	14	19	KEN
TENN	18	15	20	17	16	14	14	11	12	16	16	13	13	11	20	TENN
MIZZ	10	14	14	12	10	16	20	–	24	–	–	–	–	–	22	MIZZ
UGA	19	19	19	19	18	21	21	18	14	13	15	16	18	21	23	UGA
AUB	–	–	21	20	19	17	18	17	18	22	19	19	17	19	–	AUB
LSU	17	23	25	22	21	19	25	22	–	–	–	25	25	23	–	LSU
MISS	–	–	–	–	–	–	–	–	–	–	–	–	–	25	–	MISS
SCAR	–	–	–	–	–	–	–	–	–	–	–	–	–	–	–	SCAR
TAMU	–	–	–	–	–	–	–	–	–	–	–	–	–	–	–	TAMU

=== ESPN/USA Softball Collegiate ===
See 2022 NCAA Division I softball rankings#ESPN.com/USA Softball Collegiate Top 25 also.

Week	0	1	2	3	4	5	6	7	8	9	10	11	12	13	14	15	
FLA	5	4	4	4	4	6	6	7	6	9	9	10	11	13	14	5	FLA
ARK	9	10	8	11	11	10	8	9	9	6	6	5	5	5	4	8	ARK
ALA	2	2	2	2	2	4	4	4	4	2	2	6	8	7	8	17	ALA
TENN	16	15	17	17	18	14	14	11	11	14	14	12	12	10	10	19	TENN
MSU	–	–	–	–	–	–	–	–	–	–	–	–	–	–	–	20	MSU
KEN	20	19	14	13	12	11	13	12	12	12	12	14	15	14	15	21	KEN
MIZZ	12	17	19	8	8	17	19	25	25	–	–	25	23	22	17	22	MIZZ
UGA	19	18	18	18	19	21	21	18	16	13	13	15	18	18	19	23	UGA
AUB	–	–	21	20	20	19	18	17	17	19	18	16	15	17	17	24	AUB
LSU	14	21	24	22	21	20	22	20	21	21	21	19	19	20	22	–	LSU
MISS	–	–	–	–	–	–	–	–	–	–	–	–	–	–	–	–	MISS
SCAR	–	–	–	–	–	–	–	–	–	–	–	–	–	–	–	–	SCAR
TAMU	–	–	–	–	–	–	–	–	–	–	–	–	–	–	–	–	TAMU
