= 2020s critical race theory controversies =

Grassroots social movement

State laws restricting race education in the United States as of July 2022: States with laws restricting education on race in classrooms or state agencies States considering bills or policies that would restrict race education in schools or state agencies States that failed to pass this type of legislation States that have not introduced legislation on this topic

Since 2020, efforts have been made by people, most notably American conservatives, to challenge critical race theory (CRT) in schools in the United States. Following the 2020 protests of the murders of Ahmaud Arbery and George Floyd and the killing of Breonna Taylor, school districts began to introduce additional curricula and create diversity, equity, and inclusion (DEI)-positions to address "disparities stemming from race, economics, disabilities and other factors". These measures were met with criticism from conservatives, particularly those in the Republican Party. Political scientist Jennifer Victor of George Mason University has described this as part of a cycle of backlash against progress toward racial equality and equity. While University of Buckingham professor Eric Kauffman suggests parents are reacting to examples they're seeing in the classroom with him saying "the more voters learn about what CRT means in practice, the less they like it".

Outspoken critics of critical race theory include U.S. president Donald Trump, conservative activist Christopher Rufo, various Republican officials, and conservative commentators on Fox News and right-wing talk radio shows. Movements have arisen from the controversy; in particular, the No Left Turn in Education movement, which has been described as one of the largest groups targeting school boards regarding critical race theory. In response to the assertion that CRT was being taught in public schools, dozens of states have introduced bills that limit what schools can teach regarding race, American history, politics, and gender. A study published by Indiana University in 2024 on the censorship of critical perspectives in American schools found that "in 16 Republican-dominated states, policies have been enacted to restrict the teaching of critical perspectives on race, sexuality, and other controversial subjects and to perpetuate a positive view of U.S. history". A study published by Purchase College states that critical race theory is facing a "swift annihilation" after the 2020 controversy, which is cause for it to be studied and understood better. Following the censorship by many states and school boards, Holovka highlights the idea that censoring teachers in this way has the potential to limit critical thinking in students due to their limited ability to discuss controversial topics.

== Background ==
Critical race theory (CRT) is a cross-disciplinary intellectual and social movement of civil-rights scholars and activists who seek to examine the intersection of race, society, and law in the United States and to challenge mainstream American liberal approaches to racial justice. (Note: Critical race theory (CRT) refers to an "emerging transdisciplinary, race-equity methodology that originated in legal studies and is grounded in social justice. Critical Race Theory's tools for conducting research and practice are intended to elucidate contemporary racial phenomena, expand the vocabulary with which to discuss complex racial concepts, and challenge racial hierarchies." CRT "integrates transdisciplinary methodologies that draw on theory, experiential knowledge, and critical consciousness to illuminate and combat root causes of structural racism. It emerged after years of struggle by law students and faculty contesting what they perceived as institutionalized racism in the hiring and curricular decisions of elite law schools. Convinced that their understandings of racial power dynamics diverged in important ways from those of other legal models, they convened a meeting in 1989 at which they enumerated key racial equity principles." CRT refers to the "emergent set of methodologies that draws on these principles in pursuing racial equity via the law. Persons whose scholarship relies on Critical Race Theory (called critical race theorists) are often described as "a collection of activists and scholars interested in studying and transforming the relationship among race, racism, and power.") Conservative activism and efforts to censor curricula has resulted in the introduction of legislation banning the teaching of critical race theory in schools in many states across the United States.

== United States ==
In the run-up to and aftermath of the 2020 U.S. presidential election, opposition to CRT was adopted as a campaign theme by president Donald Trump and various conservative commentators on Fox News and right-wing talk radio shows. In an interview on Fox in September 2020, Conservative activist Christopher Rufo strongly denounced critical race theory. After appearing on Fox, Rufo was invited to a series of meetings with Trump. Trump then publicly denounced critical race theory in a speech on September 17, 2020, and announced the formation of the 1776 Commission to promote "patriotic education". Trump also issued an executive order directing agencies of the U.S. federal government to cancel funding for programs that mention "white privilege" or "critical race theory", on the basis that it constituted "divisive, un-American propaganda" and that it was "racist". (Note: September 22, 2020 Executive Order 13950 of September 22, 2020 defined "divisive concepts" as "concepts that (1) one race or sex is inherently superior to another race or sex; (2) the United States is fundamentally racist or sexist; (3) an individual, by virtue of his or her race or sex, is inherently racist, sexist, or oppressive, whether consciously or unconsciously; (4) an individual should be discriminated against or receive adverse treatment solely or partly because of his or her race or sex; (5) members of one race or sex cannot and should not attempt to treat others without respect to race or sex; (6) an individual's moral character is necessarily determined by his or her race or sex; (7) an individual, by virtue of his or her race or sex, bears responsibility for actions committed in the past by other members of the same race or sex; (8) any individual should feel discomfort, guilt, anguish, or any other form of psychological distress on account of his or her race or sex; or (9) meritocracy or traits such as a hard work ethic are racist or sexist, or were created by a particular race to oppress another race. The term 'divisive concepts' also includes any other form of race or sex stereotyping or any other form of race or sex scapegoating.") (Note: Rufo participated in drafting the language of the executive order.) (Note: On January 20, 2021, Joe Biden rescinded Trump's order and dissolved the 1776 Commission.) The most outspoken critics of CRT include Trump, Rufo, and Republican Party officials. According to The Washington Post, CRT became a "flash point" in the culture wars in the United States, and is used as "a catchall phrase for nearly any examination of systemic racism" by conservative lawmakers and activists.

=== Elected officials ===
Trump's messaging during the 2020 U.S. presidential election campaign and its aftermath included strong messaging against critical race theory. In December 2020, Trump appointed former Mississippi Governor Phil Bryant as a member of the 1776 Commission, which would to produce a report in response to The New York Times' 1619 Project. (Note: 1619 Project is both a book, The 1619 Project: A New Origin Story, and a piece of long-form journalism developed by Nikole Hannah-Jones and others.) On January 18, 2021, The 1776 Report was submitted in the form of a 41-page "national plan" for a "patriotic education" as a rebuttal to the 1619 Project. The commission also criticized what they alleged as being CRT's theoretical underpinnings—Italian Marxist Antonio Gramsci, Herbert Marcuse, and the Frankfurt School, identity politics, and Howard Zinn. In contrast, the Trump White House described The 1776 Report as the "definitive chronicle of the American founding, a powerful description of the effect the principles of the Declaration of Independence have had on this Nation's history, and a dispositive rebuttal of reckless 're-education' attempts that seek to reframe American history around the idea that the United States is not an exceptional country but an evil one." The commission was dissolved on January 21 in an executive order signed by President Joe Biden in his first day in office.

Republican senator Tom Cotton introduced an amendment to the 2021 budget reconciliation package that would prohibit the use of federal funds in CRT promotion in Pre-K programs and K-12 schools in August 2021, which passed 50 to 49. Cotton's Stop CRT Act was introduced in July 2021. Rufo praised Cotton's actions, saying that the "fight against CRT has gone national" and Cotton was "leading the way". Jim Pillen won the Republican primary race for governor in the 2022 Nebraska gubernatorial election with an election campaign based on his opposition to critical race theory as well as his stance against abortion rights. Republican candidates Glenn Youngkin and Jason Miyares have also campaigned against CRT. On his first day as governor of Virginia, Youngkin signed executive orders barring the teaching of critical race theory in public schools.

=== Advocacy groups ===
Opposition to what was purported to be critical race theory has been adopted as a major theme by several conservative think tanks and pressure groups, including The Heritage Foundation, the Idaho Freedom Foundation, the American Legislative Exchange Council (ALEC), and organizations funded by the Koch brothers. Rufo, a senior fellow at the Manhattan Institute, has been one of the most active critics of CRT, saying that it is anti-American, poses a "an existential threat to the United States", and had "pervaded every aspect of the federal government". In 2021 he wrote on Twitter, "The goal is to have the public read something crazy in the newspaper and immediately think 'critical race theory'" and "We have decodified the term and will recodify it to annex the entire range of cultural constructions that are unpopular with Americans."

The advocacy group No Left Turn in Education has been described by NBC News as "one of the largest groups targeting school boards" regarding critical race theory. Media Matters for America has described No Left Turn in Education as one of the "leading groups fearmongering about the teaching of critical race theory in schools". The article said that the group and Elana Yaron Fishbein its founder, frequently "used toxic and bigoted rhetoric on social media and in right-wing media to downplay CRT". In his 2022 book, How to Be an Antiracist, American radical activist Ibram X. Kendi described how Fishbein created No Left Turn in Education in the summer of 2020. Fishbein had pulled her children out of Gladwyne Elementary School and sent the superintendent of Lower Merion School District (LMSD) an email on June 18, 2020, challenging the LMSD's decision to introduce additional lessons in "cultural proficiency" in the wake of the murder of George Floyd, and that as an unspecified number of non-white students were launching a campaign calling for "antiracist education", Fishbein "rejected the premise of antiracism, CRT, comprehensive sex education (CSE), and climate change". Her movement was relatively small initially, but was really launched when she began to be invited as a guest on the prime time Tucker Carlson show in September 2020. Fishbein describes the movement as a grassroots parental organization that uses veteran GOP activists' playbook to enact change on school boards.

=== Mass media ===
Conservative commentators on Fox News and right-wing talk radio shows have been strongly critical of CRT. Right-wing media outlets weaponized CRT in advance of the 2021 off-year and 2022 midterm elections. Media Matters for America reported in 2021 that Fox News hosts and guests mentioned "critical race theory" over 1,900 times in the previous 3.5 months. Fox News also promoted No Left Turn in Education.

American cultural critic James A. Lindsay, known mainly for his role in the grievance studies affair, published Race Marxism: The Truth About Critical Race Theory and Practice in February 2022 in which he criticized critical race theory. In his book, he cited numerous extracts from texts on critical race theory as proof of CRT's flaws. In February 2021, William A. Jacobson, a conservative blogger and law professor at Cornell University, launched an online database of colleges across the United States teaching what he calls "critical race training", in order to enable parents to avoid those schools.

=== Public attitudes ===
The Economist and Reuters have conducted polls on how much the general public understands CRT, a "once-obscure academic concept", and they found that most people are unfamiliar with CRT and misunderstand it. Those who support CRT promote the idea that it is an "intellectual tool set developed by legal scholars for examining systemic racism". CRT originated in legal studies and was intended for legal scholars and academics. The Economist, based on YouGov data from 2021, said that 50% of Americans thought they had a "good idea of what critical race theory was and most people thought it was bad for America. However, The Economist asserted that "the attitudes and beliefs of 70% of Americans actually 'chime' with CRT—that racism is a significant social problem in the United States". According to Reuters, the claim that CRT makes is that racism is "woven into the U.S. legal system and ingrained in its primary institutions". Further, according to a survey conducted by The Economist, "a majority" of adult Americans believes that racism exists in the US Congress, in American legal structures, financial institutions, and in organizations and agencies, including the police force.

A Reuters 2021 national opinion survey found that 57% of American adults said that they were not familiar with CRT. Of those who did claim they were familiar with CRT claims, Reuters found that follow-up responses to specific questions about CRT tenets, were informed by "misconceptions about critical race theory that have been largely circulating among conservative media outlets". When asked true-false questions about CRT history and teachings, only 5% of those who said they were familiar with CRT could provide the correct answers.

=== Public school boards ===
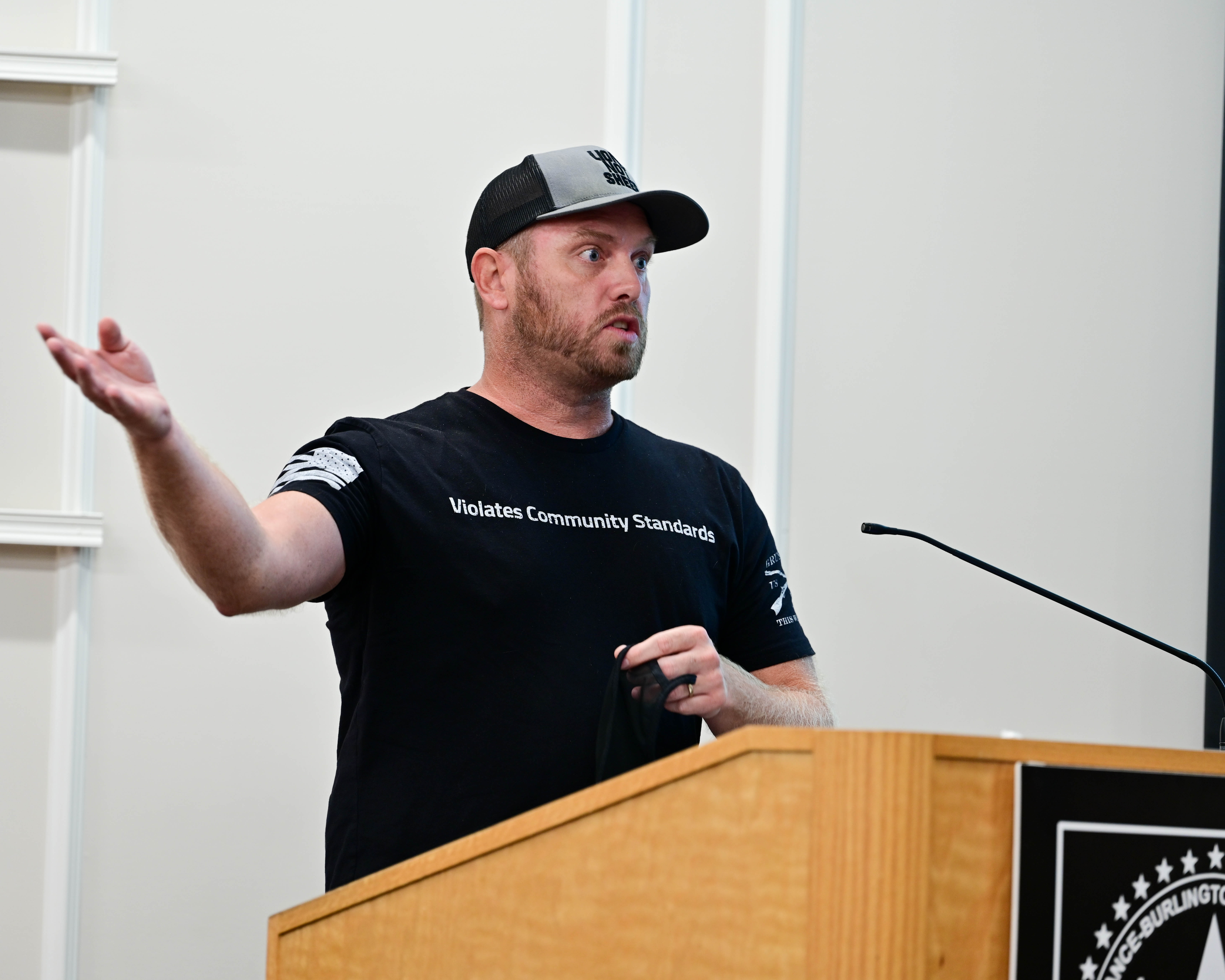
A protester speaks against critical race theory at an Alamance-Burlington School System board meeting in 2021.

Republicans focused on banning CRT from being used in public schools across the United States. By mid-summer 2021, conservative groups were bringing the battle over CRT to school boards. In Texas, Southlake, Tarrant County Carroll High School a group of POC students vied to address alleged racism after reported incidents dating back to at least 2018, and helped form the Southlake Anti-Racism Coalition (SARC). Dissenting parents formed the Southlake Families PAC and fought against them, endorsing a mayoral candidate and candidates for the school board and the city council. The PAC endorsed candidates won with about 70% of the vote. When they voted down the "call for cultural awareness into the curriculum", the PAC wrote on Twitter, "Critical Race Theory ain't coming here. This is what happens when good people stand up and say, not in my town, not on my watch." On their website, the PAC wrote: "CRT is a theoretical framework which views society as dominated by white supremacy and categorizes people as 'privileged' or 'oppressed' based on their skin color. ... It also teaches kids to hate America. Ask yourself who in their right mind would want this taught in public schools?"

One of the first suspensions related to critical race theory took place on September 1, 2021, in Colleyville in Tarrant County. James Whitfield, who was the high school's first Black principal at Colleyville Heritage High School, was suspended for allegedly promoting CRT—Whitfield repeatedly denied the allegation. Parents and dozens of teachers pleaded with the school district's board of trustees to reinstate Whitfield, a popular principal. Students held walkouts to support the principal. In the summer of 2020, Whitfield wrote an open letter sharing his concerns over the murders of Ahmaud Arbery and George Floyd, and the killing of Breonna Taylor. In response, a former school board candidate, Stetson Clark, spoke up at a July school board meeting and accused Whitfield of promoting CRT. A few people attending the meeting called out, "Fire him."

According to Dallas-based television station WFAA, by February 2022, some Christian pastors were fighting back against what they call the "far-right playbook to take down Texas public schools" saying it is "sheer destructive chaos" that has resulted in an "obscure term called Critical Race Theory ... consum[ing] parents who believe it is being taught in Texas classrooms". It has also resulted in the resignations of several school district superintendents, including in the independent school districts (ISDs) of Dallas and Fort Worth.

On June 16, 2022, ProPublica and Frontline published an article on how a group of vocal and organized anti-CRT White parents in the Cherokee County School District (CCSD) in Georgia had targeted Cecelia Lewis, a Black educator, who had been offered a job in early 2021 as CCSD's first diversity, equity and inclusion (DEI)–focused administrative position. Some of the parents researched and targeted the educator and were successful in making her next job impossible, which led to her resignation.

=== State-level legislation ===
In December 2020, the conservative nonprofit organization American Legislative Exchange Council (ALEC), which works with state legislators to draft and share model acts, facilitated a workshop entitled "Against Critical Theory's Onslaught Reclaiming Education and the American Dream" with Rufo as a featured guest and 31 state legislators in attendance. (Note: Organizers included Bridget Weisenberg from The Heritage Foundation. Featured guests included Rufo, Jonathan Butcher, and Angela Sailor from The Heritage Foundation, Ian Rowe from the American Enterprise Institute, and Robert Woodson from the Woodson Center. Along with corporate representatives, there were also 31 legislators from 20 states in attendance.) ALEC provides a forum for collaboration on model bills—helping state legislators draft legislation that other states can also modify and introduce as bills.

In early 2021, Republican-backed bills were introduced to restrict teaching about race, ethnicity, or slavery in public schools in several states, including Idaho, Iowa, Oklahoma, Tennessee and Texas. Several of these bills specifically mention "critical race theory" or single out the 1619 Project. CRT is taught at the university level, and public school teachers do not generally use the phrase "Critical Race Theory" or its legal frameworks.

In mid-April 2021, a bill was introduced in the Idaho Legislature that would effectively ban any educational entity from teaching or advocating "sectarianism", including critical race theory or other programs involving social justice. On May 4, 2021, the bill was signed into law by Governor Brad Little. On June 10, 2021, the Florida Board of Education unanimously voted to ban public schools from teaching critical race theory at the urging of governor Ron DeSantis. As of July 2021, 10 U.S. states have introduced bills or taken other steps that would restrict teaching critical race theory, and 26 others were in the process of doing so. In June 2021, the American Association of University Professors, the American Historical Association, the Association of American Colleges and Universities, and PEN America released a joint statement stating their opposition to such legislation, and by August 2021, 167 professional organizations had signed onto the statement. In August 2021, the Brookings Institution recorded that eight states—Idaho, Oklahoma, Tennessee, Texas, Iowa, New Hampshire, Arizona, and South Carolina—had passed regulation on the issue, though also noted that none of the bills that passed, with the exception of Idaho's, actually contained the words "critical race theory". Brookings also noted that these laws often extend beyond race to discussions of gender.

Timothy D. Snyder, historian and professor at Yale University, has called these new state laws memory laws – "government actions designed to guide public interpretation of the past". Early memory laws were intended to protect victim groups, such as from revisionism attempts by Holocaust deniers, but most recently have been used by Russia to protect "the feelings of the powerful", then by Donald Trump's 1776 Report in January 2021, followed by Republican-led legislatures submitting these bills. Snyder called the Idaho version "Kafkaesque in its censorship: It affirms freedom of speech and then bans divisive speech."

From January 2021 through February 2022, 35 states had introduced 137 bills that limit what "schools can teach with regard to race, American history, politics, sexual orientation and gender identity". PEN America, an American nonprofit association of writers "dedicated to free speech" affiliated with the International Freedom of Expression Exchange, has been monitoring this legislation. Jeffrey Sachs, who is tracking the legislation, said that the "recent flurry" of bills meant that the classroom has become a "minefield" for educators who want to teach "slavery, Jim Crow laws or the Holocaust". An April 2022 article in Education Week said that 42 states had either introduced legislation or "taken other steps" to restrict "teaching critical race theory" and, "more broadly, limit how teachers can discuss racism and sexism in class".

The first state to ban CRT was Idaho, when a bill was introduced in mid-April 2021 and signed by Governor Brad Little on May 4. By May 2021, multiple state legislatures introduced bills restricting the teaching of critical race theory (CRT) in public schools. Bills were passed in 14 states, all of which had both Republican-majority legislatures and Republican governors. Several of these bills specifically mention "critical race theory" or single out the New York Times' 1619 Project.

The Texas state legislature, which is predominantly Republican, banned teachers from using the 1619 Project as part of coursework. The 1619 Project revisits the role of African Americans in American history by reframing the consequences of slavery in the United States. Texas House Bill 3979, which was authored by Republican state Senator Bryan Hughes and others, became law in December 2021, limiting the way in which Texas schools are permitted to teach about race and racism, as well as other issues. Under Bill 3979, this bill declares that teachers should avoid teaching the following concepts "(1) one race or sex is inherently superior to the other; (2) an individual is inherently racist, sexist or oppressive because of their own race or sex; (3) an individual should be treated unfairly because their race or sex; (4) members of certain groups should not disrespect individuals on the basis of race, sex, or religion; (5) an individual's morality is based on their race or sex; (6) an individual bears responsibility for actions committed in the past by people of the same race or sex; (7) an individual should be ashamed or guilty because of their race or sex; (8) meritocracy is racist or sexist." Teachers also no longer have any obligation to undertake any training on how to deal with racism in the classroom. The list is based on the "divisive concepts" listed in Trump's September 28, 2020, executive order.

On June 10, 2021, the Florida Board of Education banned CRT out of concerns that the concept of racism embedded in CRT is one that continues to uphold white supremacy in American society and its legal systems. The board's vote, which was encouraged by governor Ron DeSantis, was unanimous.

In April 2022, Republican Governor Brian Kemp defended his signing of bills banning CRT that month by claiming that the state was protecting parents' fundamental rights to direct their children's education by preventing classrooms in Georgia from becoming "pawns to those who indoctrinate our kids with their partisan political agendas".

A number of state laws to ban CRT from being taught in state public schools did not include the words "critical race theory", with the exception of the laws passed in Idaho, according to a July 2, 2021 Brookings Institution article.

=== Religious organizations ===
Discourse around CRT has been divisive for many churches.

The Southern Baptist Convention in a 2019 resolution stated that "[c]ritical race theory and intersectionality [...] can aid in evaluating a variety of human experiences". In 2020 six SBC presidents declared critical race theory to be 'incompatible' with SBC's statement of faith. Consequently, several pastors have left the SBC.

In November 2020, student leaders of Cru, a student Christian organization, wrote a letter to Cru's president associating CRT with "unbiblical ideas that have led us to disunity".

In an American Association of Christian Counselors talk in 2021 entitled "The Five Greatest Global Epidemics", evangelist Josh McDowell cited critical race theory as the first epidemic. He stated that he did not "believe Blacks, African Americans, and many other minorities have equal opportunity". On Twitter (now X) he later clarified and apologised for some of his comments, and maintained that "Racism has kept equality from being achieved in our nation".

== Other countries ==
In countries outside of the United States, the teaching of critical race theory and white privilege has also been controversial.

=== Australia ===
In Australia, the conservative Coalition government supported a Senate motion by Pauline Hanson to ban the teaching of critical race theory in the Australian National Curriculum. The Senate motion occurred during a review of the Australian National Curriculum. The motion did not recognize that the curriculum document did not have a reference to Critical Race Theory. Such a pre-emptive move has been linked to transnational culture wars between the UK, US and Australia.

In June 2021, following media reports that the proposed national curriculum was "preoccupied with the oppression, discrimination and struggles of Indigenous Australians", the Australian Senate approved a motion tabled by right-wing senator Pauline Hanson calling on the federal government to reject CRT, despite it not being included in the curriculum. Despite this, CRT is gaining increasing popularity in Australian academic circles, to investigate Indigenous issues/studies, Islamophobia and Black Africans' experiences.

=== France ===
In January 2022, the French minister of education Jean-Michel Blanquer called for "combat against an intellectual frame originating from American universities [...] which seeks to essentialise communities and identities, which is something that goes against to our republican model".

=== The Netherlands ===
In 2021 there were 34 ministers out of the 150 member house of representatives who were in favor of removing critical race theory from the curriculum. Representative Caroline van der Plas said in a debate on 25 January 2023:

We will need to continue to have the conversation about [our] history. We will have to keep looking for one anothers stories. I am of the belief we should have a debate here about what is thought, felt and discussed in society [in The Netherlands], not based on what comes blowing over from [the United States]. What happens on universities in [the United states], blows over to [the Netherlands]. It lands in the student life of Amsterdam and in the grachtengordel. But outside of [the randstad], the A10, people are not concerned with this at all. Those people are not busy with terms such as white fragility, critical race theory or decolonization. So I would like to make a call to have the Dutch debate about slavery, and not the American debate.

=== United Kingdom ===
In the United Kingdom, educators were warned by the then Women and Equalities minister Kemi Badenoch that teachers teaching white privilege as fact would be breaking the law. Conservatives within the UK government began to criticize CRT in late 2020. Badenoch, who is of Nigerian descent, said during a parliamentary debate to mark Black History Month, "We do not want to see teachers teaching their pupils about white privilege and inherited racial guilt [...] Any school which teaches these elements of critical race theory, or which promotes partisan political views such as defunding the police without offering a balanced treatment of opposing views, is breaking the law."

In an open letter, 101 writers of the Black Writers' Guild denounced Badenoch for remarks about popular anti-racism books such as White Fragility and Why I'm No Longer Talking to White People About Race, made in an interview in The Spectator, in which she said, "many of these books—and, in fact, some of the authors and proponents of critical race theory—actually want a segregated society".

Anti-CRT group Color Us United promised to "battle" The Salvation Army due to the latter's guidance pamphlet titled "Let's Talk About Racism".

In September 2023, an Employment Tribunal ruled that opposition to critical race theory, with support for the attitude of Martin Luther King Jr. towards race, was a philosophical belief protected under the Equality Act 2010.

== See also ==
- Anti-bias curriculum
- Judicial aspects of race in the United States
- Racism in the United States

== Works cited ==
A

- Adams, Biba (May 4, 2021). "Bill banning critical race theory in public schools becomes law". Yahoo News. Archived from the original on May 6, 2021.
- American Legislative Exchange Council (December 7, 2020). Against Critical Theory's Onslaught Reclaiming Education and the American Dream. ALEC Workshops. Bridget Weisenberg (Director) and Chris Rufo, Jonathan Butcher, Angela Sailor, Ian Rowe, Robert Woodson (Guests). Event occurs at 1:00:03.
- Asmelash, Leah (May 5, 2021). "A school district tried to address racism, a group of parents fought back". CNN. Archived from the original on October 19, 2021.
- Awtrey, Jeff (July 16, 2021). "Texas Senate passes Hughes bill banning teaching of critical race theory in public schools". KLTV. Archived from the original on October 23, 2021.

B

- Banks, Jasmine (August 13, 2021). "The Radical Capitalist Behind the Critical Race Theory Furor". The Nation. ISSN 0027-8378.
- Bauer, Will (May 10, 2022). "Race results: Trump's endorsement fails in Nebraska GOP governor primary: NPR". NPR.
- Beauchamp, Zack (October 15, 2018). "The controversy around hoax studies in critical theory, explained". Vox.
- Bernstein, Sharon (April 28, 2022). "Georgia becomes latest U.S. state to ban 'divisive' concepts in teaching about race". Reuters.
- Bunay, Angela (February 24, 2021). "Students Weigh in on Critical Race Theory Database Launched by Law School Professor". The Cornell Daily Sun.

C

- Tucker Carlson (host), Elana Fishbein (guest) (October 7, 2021). Pennsylvania parent speaks out after DOJ targets parents at school board meetings. Event occurs at 2:56.
- Carr, Nicole (June 16, 2022). "White Parents Rallied to Chase a Black Educator Out of Town. Then, They Followed Her to the Next One". ProPublica.

D

- Dawsey, Josh; Stein, Jeff (September 5, 2020). "White House directs federal agencies to cancel race-related training sessions it calls 'un-American propaganda'". The Washington Post. ISSN 0190-8286. Archived from the original on September 11, 2020.

E

- "Americans who have heard of critical race theory don't like it". The Economist. June 17, 2021. ISSN 0013-0613.
- "Map: Where Critical Race Theory Is Under Attack". Education Week. June 11, 2021. ISSN 0277-4232.
- "Critical race theory". Encyclopaedia Britannica. September 21, 2021. Archived from the original on November 22, 2021.

F

- "Combating Race and Sex Stereotyping". Federal Register. September 28, 2020.
- Ford, Chandra L.; Airhihenbuwa, Collins O. (April 2010). "Critical Race Theory, Race Equity, and Public Health: Toward Antiracism Praxis". American Journal of Public Health. 100 (Suppl. 1): S30–S35. doi:10.2105/AJPH.2009.171058. ISSN 0090-0036. PMC 2837428. PMID 20147679.

G

- Gregory, Chandi (August 11, 2021). "Cotton amendment to defund Critical Race Theory passed by Senate". 5News Online.
- Greenblatt, Alan (December 2011). "ALEC Enjoys A New Wave of Influence and Criticism". Governing. Archived from the original on December 24, 2013.
- Greenfield, Nathan M. (June 12, 2021). "Why are states lining up to ban critical race theory?". University World News. Archived from the original on June 13, 2021.
- Gross, Terry (February 3, 2022). "From slavery to socialism, new legislation restricts what teachers can discuss". NPR.

H

- Hananoki, Eric (June 22, 2021). "No Left Turn in Education, a leading anti-critical race theory group, frequently pushes toxic rhetoric in media". Media Matters for America.
- Harris, Adam (May 7, 2021). "The GOP's 'Critical Race Theory' Obsession". The Atlantic. Archived from the original on May 26, 2021.
- Herbert, Geoff (February 5, 2021). "CNY professor creates list of colleges with 'critical race theory,' says it'll help parents avoid them". Syracuse.com.

I

- Iati, Marisa (May 29, 2021). "What is critical race theory, and why do Republicans want to ban it in schools?". The Washington Post.

K

- Kahn, Chris (July 15, 2021). "Many Americans embrace falsehoods about critical race theory". Reuters.
- Kendi, Ibram X. (June 14, 2022a). How to Raise an Antiracist. Random House Publishing Group. ISBN 978-0-593-24253-7.
- Kendi, Ibram X. (June 15, 2022b). "Republicans help maintain racism by undermining critical race theory in public education". USA Today.
- Kingkade, Tyler; Zadrozny, Brandy; Collins, Ben (June 15, 2021). "Critical race theory battle invades school boards — with help from conservative groups". NBC News. Archived from the original on June 16, 2021.
- Knowles, Rachel (June 23, 2021). "Coalition supports Pauline Hanson motion to ban critical race theory teachings". National Indigenous Times. Archived from the original on November 5, 2022.

L

- Lang, Cady (September 29, 2020). "President Trump Has Attacked Critical Race Theory. Here's What to Know About the Intellectual Movement". Time. Archived from the original on January 16, 2021.
- Lindsay, James (February 15, 2022). Race Marxism: The Truth About Critical Race Theory and Practice. New Discourses. p. 357. ASIN B09QFYX2CD.
- Lopez, Brian (November 10, 2021). "North Texas principal resigns to end fight over whether he was teaching "critical race theory"". The Texas Tribune.

M

- "Christopher F. Rufo". Manhattan Institute. n.d.
- Manus, Matt (March 2022). "Race Marxism Is a Very Strange, Very Bad Book". Jacobin.
- Meckler, Laura; Dawsey, Josh (June 21, 2021). "Republicans, spurred by an unlikely figure, see political promise in critical race theory". The Washington Post. ISSN 0190-8286. Archived from the original on June 21, 2021.
- Meyer, Theodoric; Severns, Maggie; McGraw, Meridith (June 23, 2021). "'The Tea Party to the 10th power': Trumpworld bets big on critical race theory". Politico.

N

- Najarro, Ileana (April 21, 2022). "How Laws on Race, Sexuality Could Clash With Culturally Responsive Teaching". Education Week. ISSN 0277-4232.
- Napier-Raman, Kishor (June 22, 2021). "Government backs Hanson's critical race theory culture war. The question is: why?". Politics. Crikey. Archived from the original on November 5, 2022.

O

- O'Kane, Caitlin (May 21, 2021). "Nearly a dozen states want to ban critical race theory in schools". CBS News. Archived from the original on June 13, 2021.

P

- Pittman, Ashton (January 21, 2021). "Biden Disbands Trump's 'Patriotic Education' Committee That Included Ex-Gov. Bryant". Mississippi Free Press.
- Postal, Leslie (June 10, 2021). "Florida board votes to ban "critical race theory" from state classrooms". Orlando Sentinel. Archived from the original on June 12, 2021.
- Power, Lis (June 15, 2021). "Fox News' obsession with critical race theory, by the numbers". Media Matters for America.

R

- Ray, Rashawn; Gibbons, Alexandra (July 2, 2021). "Why are states banning critical race theory?". Brookings Institution.
- Joy Reid (host), James Whitfield (guest) (September 17, 2021). First Black Principal At TX School Suspended After Being Accused Of Promoting CRT. The ReidOut. MSNBC.
- Richert, Kevin; Jones, Blake (April 19, 2021). "Legislative roundup, 4.19.21: New bill targets sectarianism, critical race theory". Idaho Education News. Archived from the original on April 19, 2021.
- Rufo, Christopher F. [@realchrisrufo] (March 15, 2021). "@ConceptualJames The goal is to have the public read something crazy in the newspaper and immediately think "critical race theory." We have decodified the term and will recodify it to annex the entire range of cultural constructions that are unpopular with Americans" (Tweet) – via Twitter.

S

- Sachs, Jeffrey (January 24, 2022). "Steep Rise in Gag Orders, Many Sloppily Drafted". PEN America.
- Scott, Eugene (January 19, 2021). "Analysis | The 1776 Project report attacks a concept at the foundation of the Trump presidency: 'Identity politics'". The Washington Post. ISSN 0190-8286.
- Shepherd, Katie (September 21, 2021b). "Families beg for Black principal to be reinstated after critical race theory dispute: 'Nothing short of a witch hunt'". The Washington Post. ISSN 0190-8286.
- Smietana, Bob (May 18, 2021a). "Why grievance studies hoaxer and atheist James Lindsay wants to save Southern Baptists". Religion News Service.

T

- "House Bill 3979" (PDF). The Texas Legislature. June 15, 2021.
- Trump, Donald J. (September 22, 2020). "Executive Order on Combating Race and Sex Stereotyping". The White House. Archived from the original on February 25, 2021.

W

- Wallace-Wells, Benjamin (June 18, 2021). "How a Conservative Activist Invented the Conflict Over Critical Race Theory". The New Yorker. OCLC 909782404. Archived from the original on June 18, 2021.
- Waxman, Olivia (June 24, 2021). "'Critical Race Theory Is Simply the Latest Bogeyman.' Inside the Fight Over What Kids Learn About America's History". Time.
- Whitely, Jason (February 2, 2022). "The far-right playbook to take down Texas public schools is 'sheer destructive chaos,' pastors claim". Dallas: WFAA.
- Wiener, Don; Kotch, Alex (July 27, 2021). "ALEC Inspires Lawmakers to File Anti-Critical Race Theory Bills". Center for Media and Democracy.
- Wilson, Reid (June 22, 2021). "GOP sees critical race theory battle as potent midterm weapon". The Hill.
- Wood, Vincent (October 21, 2020). "Teachers presenting white privilege as fact are breaking the law, minister warns". News. The Independent. Archived from the original on November 5, 2022.
