= Varland =

Varland is a surname. Notable people with the surname include:

- Gus Varland (born 1996), American baseball player
- Louis Varland (born 1997), American baseball player
