= 2022 SEC softball tournament =

Postseason collegiate softball tournament

2022 Southeastern Conference softball tournament
- Teams: 13
- Format: Single-elimination tournament
- Finals site: Katie Seashole Pressly Stadium; Gainesville, Florida
- Champions: Arkansas (1st title)
- Runner-up: Missouri
- Winning coach: Courtney Deifel (1st title)
- MVP: Chenise Delce (Arkansas)
- Television: SEC Network; ESPN2

2022 Southeastern Conference softball standings
	Conf.				Overall
Team	W		L	PCT	W		L	PCT
No. 9 Arkansas ‍†‍‡‍^{y}	19	–	5	.792	48	–	11	.814
No. 17 Alabama ‍‍‍^{y}	16	–	8	.667	44	–	13	.772
No. 20 Tennessee ‍‍‍^{y}	15	–	8	.652	41	–	18	.695
No. 5 Florida ‍‍‍^{y}	13	–	11	.542	49	–	19	.721
No. 21 Kentucky ‍‍‍^{y}	13	–	11	.542	37	–	19	.661
LSU ‍‍‍^{y}	13	–	11	.542	34	–	23	.596
No. 23 Missouri ‍‍‍^{y}	12	–	11	.522	38	–	22	.633
No. 22 Georgia ‍‍‍^{y}	12	–	12	.500	43	–	18	.705
Ole Miss ‍‍‍^{y}	12	–	12	.500	41	–	19	.683
No. 24 Auburn ‍‍‍^{y}	11	–	13	.458	40	–	17	.702
No. 19 Mississippi State ‍‍‍^{y}	10	–	14	.417	37	–	27	.578
Texas A&M ‍‍‍^{y}	6	–	18	.250	31	–	28	.525
South Carolina ‍‍‍	3	–	21	.125	26	–	30	.464
† – Conference champion ‡ – Tournament champion y – Invited to the NCAA tournament As of June 9, 2022; Rankings from NFCA/USA Today

The 2022 Southeastern Conference Softball Tournament, played for the 2022 Southeastern Conference softball season, was the postseason softball tournament that determined the 2022 champion of the Southeastern Conference. It was held at Katie Seashole Pressly Softball Stadium on the campus of the University of Florida in Gainesville, Florida, from May 10–14, 2022. As the tournament winner, Arkansas earned the Southeastern Conference's automatic bid to the 2022 NCAA Division I softball tournament. The championship game, as well as the semifinals, were broadcast on ESPN2, while all other tournament games were televised on the SEC Network.

== Format ==
All thirteen teams will be seeded based on conference winning percentage. They then will play a single-elimination tournament, with the top four seeds receiving a single bye, and the bottom two playing the first-round game on May 10.

== Record vs. conference opponents ==
Date m/dd is for last scheduled game of series. Blank are not scheduled. Blue are home games, otherwise away.

2022 SEC softball records Source: 2022 SEC softball game results, 2022 SEC softball schedule
Team	W–L	ALA	ARK	AUB	FLA	UGA	KEN	LSU	MSU	MIZZ	MISS	SCAR	TENN	TAMU	Team	SR	SW
ALA	16–8		.	.	2–1	2–1	2–1	1–2	3–0	2–1	.	3–0	.	1–2	ALA	6–2	2–0
ARK	19–5	.		3–0	3–0	.	2–1	2–1	.	.	2–1	3–0	2–1	2–1	ARK	8–0	3–0
AUB	11–13	.	0–3		1–2	2–1	1–2	.	2–1	.	.	2–1	0–3	3–0	AUB	4–4	1–2
FLA	13–11	1–2	0–3	2–1		.	.	2–1	2–1	.	3–0	.	1–2	2–1	FLA	5–3	1–1
UGA	12–12	1–2	.	1–2	.		.	1–2	.	2–1	1–2	2–1	2–1	2–1	UGA	4–4	0–0
KEN	13–11	1–2	1–2	2–1	.	.		3–0	2–1	0–3	2–1	2–1	.	.	KEN	5–3	1–1
LSU	13–11	2–1	1–2	.	1–2	2–1	0–3		2–1	.	.	3–0	.	2–1	LSU	5–3	1–1
MSU	10–14	0–3	.	1–2	1–2	.	1–2	1–2		2–1	3–0	.	1–2	.	MSU	2–6	1–1
MIZZ	12–11	1–2	.	.	.	1–2	3–0	.	1–2		0–3	3–0	0–2	3–0	MIZZ	3–5	2–1
MISS	12–12	.	1–2	.	0–3	2–1	1–2	.	0–3	3–0		3–0	2–1	.	MISS	4–4	2–2
SCAR	3–21	0–3	0–3	1–2	.	1–2	1–2	0–3	.	0–3	0–3		.	.	SCAR	0–8	0–5
TENN	15–8	.	1–2	3–0	2–1	1–2	.	.	2–1	2–0	1–2	.		3–0	TENN	5–3	2–0
TAMU	6–18	2–1	1–2	0–3	1–2	1–2	.	1–2	.	0–3	.	.	0–3		TAMU	1–7	0–3
Team	W–L	ALA	ARK	AUB	FLA	UGA	KEN	LSU	MSU	MIZZ	MISS	SCAR	TENN	TAMU	Team	SR	SW

Updated for entire regular season. Tiebrkrs: KEN&FLA>LSU KEN>FLA hd–hd. MISS>UGA hd–hd.

== Bracket ==
First Round; Tuesday, May 10
12	Texas A&M	5
13	South Carolina	3

Second Round; Wednesday, May 11
8	Ole Miss	9
9	Georgia	5
5	Florida	4
12	Texas A&M	1
6	LSU	4
11	Mississippi State	7
7	Missouri	1
10	Auburn	0

Quarterfinals; Thursday, May 12
1	Arkansas	3
8	Ole Miss	0
4	Kentucky	3
5	Florida	9
3	Tennessee	1
11	Mississippi State	0
2	Alabama	0
7	Missouri	3

Semifinals; Friday, May 13
1	Arkansas	4
5	Florida	1
3	Tennessee	0
7	Missouri	3

Championship; Saturday, May 14
1	Arkansas	4
7	Missouri	0
