= 2022 Ole Miss Rebels softball team =

American college softball season

2022 Ole Miss Rebels softball
- Conference: Southeastern Conference
- Record: 41-19 (12–12 SEC)
- Head coach: Jamie Trachsel (2nd season)
- Assistant coaches: Katie Rietkovich Browder; Ryker Chason
- Home stadium: Ole Miss Softball Complex

2022 Southeastern Conference softball standings
	Conf.				Overall
Team	W		L	PCT	W		L	PCT
No. 9 Arkansas ‍†‍‡‍^{y}	19	–	5	.792	48	–	11	.814
No. 17 Alabama ‍‍‍^{y}	16	–	8	.667	44	–	13	.772
No. 20 Tennessee ‍‍‍^{y}	15	–	8	.652	41	–	18	.695
No. 5 Florida ‍‍‍^{y}	13	–	11	.542	49	–	19	.721
No. 21 Kentucky ‍‍‍^{y}	13	–	11	.542	37	–	19	.661
LSU ‍‍‍^{y}	13	–	11	.542	34	–	23	.596
No. 23 Missouri ‍‍‍^{y}	12	–	11	.522	38	–	22	.633
No. 22 Georgia ‍‍‍^{y}	12	–	12	.500	43	–	18	.705
Ole Miss ‍‍‍^{y}	12	–	12	.500	41	–	19	.683
No. 24 Auburn ‍‍‍^{y}	11	–	13	.458	40	–	17	.702
No. 19 Mississippi State ‍‍‍^{y}	10	–	14	.417	37	–	27	.578
Texas A&M ‍‍‍^{y}	6	–	18	.250	31	–	28	.525
South Carolina ‍‍‍	3	–	21	.125	26	–	30	.464
† – Conference champion ‡ – Tournament champion y – Invited to the NCAA tournament As of June 9, 2022; Rankings from NFCA/USA Today

The 2022 Ole Miss Rebels softball team represented the University of Mississippi in the 2022 NCAA Division I softball season. The Rebels played their home games at the Ole Miss Softball Complex.

== Previous season ==
The Rebels finished the 2021 season 36–22 overall, and 12–12 in the SEC to finish in eighth place in the conference. They were invited to the Tucson Regional where they finished 2–2.

== Schedule and results ==
2022 Ole Miss Rebels softball game log
Regular season (38–16)

February (12–4)
Date	Opponent	Rank	Site/stadium	Score	Win	Loss	Save	TV	Attendance	Overall record	SEC record
February 10	vs. No. 17 Oregon		Anderson Family Field; Fullerton, CA	**L** 0–3	Kliethermes (1–0)	**Borgen** (0–1)			557	0–1	–
Easton Classic
February 10	vs. Dixie State (Note: Now known as Utah Tech Trailblazers)		Anderson Family Field	**W** 10–1^{5}	**Bruce** (1–0)	Burgess (0–1)			150	1–1	–
February 11	vs. Colorado State		Anderson Family Field	**W** 7–6	**Furbush** (1–0)	Hornbuckle (0–1)	**Diederich** (1)		231	2–1	–
February 11	at Cal State Fullerton		Anderson Family Field	**W** 6–5	**Diederich** (1–0)	Silvas (0–1)		ESPN+	422	3–1	–
February 12	vs. San Diego		Anderson Family Field	**L** 2–5	Rose (2–0)	**Furbush** (1–1)	**Earnshaw** (2)		187	3–2	–
February 12	vs. California		Anderson Family Field	**W** 1–0^{DDR}	**Borgen** (1–1)	Reimers (1–1)	**Diederich** (2)		187	4–2	–
Troy Invitational
February 18	vs. Nicholls		Troy Softball Complex; Troy, AL	**W** 10–25	**Riley** (1–0)	Turner (1–2)			79	5–2	–
February 18	vs. Eastern Kentucky		Troy Softball Complex	**W** 2–1	**Diederich** (2–0)	Reynoso (0–4)			112	6–2	–
February 19	vs. Eastern Kentucky		Troy Softball Complex	**W** 8–06	**Furbush** (2–1)	Todd (0–4)			127	7–2	–
February 19	at Troy		Troy Softball Complex	**L** 3–4	Johnson (5–0)	Borgen (1–2)			517	–	–
February 20	at Troy		Troy Softball Complex	**W** 8–7	**Diederich** (2–0)	Johnson (5–1)	**Borgen** (1)	ESPN+	237	8–3	–
February 22	Southern Miss		Ole Miss Softball Complex; Oxford, MS	–	(–)	(–)		SECN+	,	–	–
Knights Classic
February 25	vs. James Madison		UCF Softball Complex; Orlando, FL	**W** 4–1	**Furbush** (3–1)	Humphrey (1–2)				9–3	–
February 25	at UCF		UCF Softball Complex	**L** 3–6	Woodall (3–1)	**Riley** (1–1)			931	9–4	–
February 26	vs. DePaul		UCF Softball Complex	**W** 2–0	**Vestal** (1–0)	Hocker (1–3)				10–4	–
February 27	vs. DePaul		UCF Softball Complex	**W** 3–1	**Bruce** (2–0)	Halvorson (2–2)	**Diederich** (3)			11–4	–
February 27	vs. Oakland		UCF Softball Complex	**W** 6–0	**Diederich** (4–0)	Knoyvka (0–1)				12–4	–

March (13–3)
Date	Opponent	Rank	Site/stadium	Score	Win	Loss	Save	TV	Attendance	Overall record	SEC record
March 2	Southeast Missouri State		Ole Miss Softball Complex	**W** 7–4	**Riley** (2–1)	Rook (4–3)		SECN+	207	13–4	–
Ole Miss Classic
March 4	Saint Louis		Ole Miss Softball Complex	**W** 8–5	**Bruce** (3–0)	Wendling (2–3)		SECN+	187	14–4	–
March 4	Western Kentucky		Ole Miss Softball Complex	**W** 2–0	**Vestal** (2–0)	Nunn (7–2)		SECN+	187	15–4	–
March 5	Saint Louis		Ole Miss Softball Complex	**W** 8–0^{6}	**Furbush** (3–1)	Hochman (1–5)		SECN+	258	16–4	–
March 5	Western Kentucky		Ole Miss Softball Complex	**W** 10–2^{6}	**Vestal** (3–0)	Gardner (3–1)		SECN+	263	17–4	–
March 6	Samford		Ole Miss Softball Complex	**W** 2–0	**Riley** (3–1)	Newcomb (4–5)		SECN+	188	18–4	–
March 8	Southern Miss		Ole Miss Softball Complex	–	(–)	(–)		SECN+	,	–	–
March 10	Stephen F. Austin		Ole Miss Softball Complex	**W** 6–2	**Vestal** (4–0)	Gainous (1–3)		SECN+	162	19–4	–
March 11	Stephen F. Austin		Ole Miss Softball Complex	**W** 12–2^{5}	**Vestal** (5–0)	Wilbur (4–8)		SECN+		20–4	–
March 12	Stephen F. Austin		Ole Miss Softball Complex	**W** 7–4	**Riley** (4–1)	Hannabas (1–3)		SECN+	103	21–4	–
March 15	Mississippi Valley State		Ole Miss Softball Complex	–	(–)	(–)		SECN+	,	–	–
March 15	Mississippi Valley State		Ole Miss Softball Complex	–	(–)	(–)		SECN+	,	–	–
March 18	at Mississippi State		Nusz Park; Starkville, MS	**L** 8–9	Hawk (7–2)	**Borgen** (1–3)		SECN+	797	21–5	0–1
March 19	at Mississippi State		Nusz Park	**L** 3–7	Faapito (3–0)	**Vestal** (5–1)		SECN	1,020	21–6	0–2
March 20	at Mississippi State		Nusz Park	**L** 0–6	Hawk (8–2)	**Diederich** (4–1)		SECN+	745	21–7	0–3
March 25	No. 21 Missouri		Ole Miss Softball Complex	**W** 5–1	**Borgen** (2–3)	Weber (6–3)		ESPNU	242	22–7	1–3
March 26	No. 21 Missouri		Ole Miss Softball Complex	**W** 5–3	**Riley** (5–1)	Krings (9–4)		SECN+	562	23–7	2–3
March 27	No. 21 Missouri		Ole Miss Softball Complex	**W** 5–1	**Borgen** (3–3)	Krings (9–5)		SECN+	345	24–7	3–3
March 29	UT Martin		Ole Miss Softball Complex	**W** 8–3	**Vestal** (6–1)	Layne (4–2)		SECN+	137	25–7	–

April (10–7)
Date	Opponent	Rank	Site/stadium	Score	Win	Loss	Save	TV	Attendance	Overall record	SEC record
April 1	No. 10 Arkansas		Ole Miss Softball Complex	**W** 2–0	**Borgen** (4–3)	Delce (5–2)	**Riley** (1)	SECN+	436	26–7	4–3
April 2	No. 10 Arkansas		Ole Miss Softball Complex	**L** 3–6	Haff (10–3)	**Riley** (5–2)		SECN	442	26–8	4–4
April 3	No. 10 Arkansas		Ole Miss Softball Complex	**L** 0–8	Haff (11–3)	**Borgen** (4–4)		SECN+	545	26–9	4–5
April 5	Tennessee State		Ole Miss Softball Complex	**W** 10–0^{5}	**Vestal** (7–1)	Loveless (4–10)		SECN+	81	27–9	–
April 5	Tennessee State		Ole Miss Softball Complex	**W** 17–0^{5}	**Riley** (6–2)	Manus (6–8)		SECN+	101	28–9	–
April 8	at No. 8 Kentucky		John Cropp Stadium; Lexington, KY	**W** 7–6	**Riley** (7–2)	Gayan (4–1)		SECN	284	29–9	5–5
April 9	at No. 8 Kentucky		John Cropp Stadium	**L** 2–6	Schoonover (4–2)	**Diederich** (4–2)		SECN	875	29–10	5–6
April 10	at No. 8 Kentucky		John Cropp Stadium	**L** 2–8	Lacatena (7–2)	**Borgen** (4–5)		SECN+	1,412	29–11	5–7
April 14	No. 9 Florida		Ole Miss Softball Complex	**L** 4–7	Hightower (11–4)	**Riley** (7–3)	**Lugo** (2)	SECN+	331	29–12	5–8
April 15	No. 9 Florida		Ole Miss Softball Complex	**L** 3–7	Pittman (2–0)	**Borgen** (4–6)	Lugo (3)	SECN+	483	29–13	5–9
April 16	No. 9 Florida		Ole Miss Softball Complex	**L** 9–10	Lugo (8–4)	**Borgen** (4–7)		SECN+	522	29–14	5–10
April 19	Louisiana Tech		Ole Miss Softball Complex	**W** 10–0^{5}	**Diederich** (4–2)	Menzina (4–6)		SECN+	152	30–14	–
April 22	at South Carolina		Carolina Softball Stadium; Columbia, SC	**W** 8–3	**Riley** (8–3)	Betenbaugh (5–5)		SECN+	1,516	31–14	6–10
April 23	at South Carolina		Carolina Softball Stadium	**W** 2–1	**Furbush** (5–1)	Powell (6–7)	**Borgen** (2)	SECN	1,739	32–14	7–10
April 24	at South Carolina		Carolina Softball Stadium	**W** 3–0	**Riley** (9–3)	Powell (6–8)	**Borgen** (3)	SECN+	1,571	33–14	8–10
April 26	at Memphis		Tigers Softball Complex; Memphis, TN	**W** 11–0^{5}	**Riley** (10–3)	Siems (8–17)		ESPN+	374	34–14	–
April 30	No. 13 Tennessee		Ole Miss Softball Complex	**W** 5–4	**Riley** (11–3)	White (2–2)		SECN+	973	35–14	9–10

May (3–2)
Date	Opponent	Rank	Site/stadium	Score	Win	Loss	Save	TV	Attendance	Overall record	SEC record
May 1	No. 13 Tennessee		Ole Miss Softball Complex	**L** 1–10^{6}	Rogers (8–5)	**Riley** (11–4)		SECN	534	35–15	9–11
May 2	No. 13 Tennessee		Ole Miss Softball Complex	**W** 3–1	**Borgen** (3–1)	Edmoundson (18–6)		SECN	535	36–15	10–11
May 6	at No. 16 Georgia		Jack Turner Stadium; Athens, GA	**L** 1–9^{6}	Kerpics (18–7)	**Borgen** (5–8)		SECN+	782	36–16	10–12
May 7	at No. 16 Georgia		Jack Turner Stadium	**W** 10–8	**Vestel** (8–1)	Rogers (10–2)		SECN	1,487	37–16	11–12
May 8	at No. 16 Georgia		Jack Turner Stadium	**W** 4–2	**Borgen** (6–8)	Kerpics (18–8)		SECN+	1,512	38–16	12–12

Post-Season (3–3)

SEC tournament (1–1)
Date	Opponent	Seed	Site/stadium	Score	Win	Loss	Save	TV	Attendance	Overall record	SECT Record
May 11	vs. No. 18 Georgia		Katie Seashole Pressly Softball Stadium; Gainesville, FL	**W** 9–5	**Borgen** (7–8)	Kerpics (18–9)		SECN	1,610	39–16	1–0
May 12	vs. No. 4 Arkansas		Katie Seashole Pressly Softball Stadium	**L** 0–3	Haff (18–4)	**Borgen** (7–9)		SECN	1,726	39–17	1–1

NCAA tournament (2–2)
Date	Opponent	Seed	Site/stadium	Score	Win	Loss	Save	TV	Attendance	Overall record	NCAAT Record
May 20	vs. Loyola Marymount		Easton Stadium; Los Angeles, CA	**L** 2–4	Perez (17–6)	**Borgen** (7–10)		ESPN+		39–18	0–1
May 21	vs. Grand Canyon		Easton Stadium	**W** 9–5	**Diederich** (6–2)	Hambrick (14–7)		ESPN+	1,328	40–18	1–1
May 21	vs. Loyola Marymount		Easton Stadium	**W** 4–2	**Riley** (12–4)	Caymol (3–2)	**Furbush** (1)	ESPN+	1,328	41–18	2–1
May 22	vs. No 5 UCLA		Easton Stadium	**L** 1–9^{5}	Azevedo (19–2)	**Borgen** (7–11)		ESPN+	1,328	41–19	2–2

Legend: = Win = Loss = Canceled
Bold = Ole Miss team member
Rankings are based on the team's current ranking in the NFCA poll.

== Roster ==
2020 Ole Miss Rebels softball team
Players
Coaches

#	Pos.	Name	Bats/throws	Height	Year	High school/junior college	Home town
2	INF	Brooke Lorenzo	L/R	5 ft 7 in (1.7 m)	Fr	Obra D. Tompkins	Katy, TX
3	INF	Keila Kamoku	R/R	5 ft 4 in (1.63 m)	Fr	Kamehameha Schools Kapālama	Kapolei, HI
4	C	KK Esparza	R/R	5 ft 8 in (1.73 m)	Fr	Friendswood	Friendswood, TX
6	INF	Mikayla Allee	R/R	5 ft 4 in (1.63 m)	Sr	Norco	Corona, CA
7	INF	Brooke Barnard	R/R	5 ft 10 in (1.78 m)	Fr	Palm Beach Gardens	Palm Beach Gardens, FL
8	OF	Annie Orman	R/R	5 ft 7 in (1.7 m)	Fr	West Union	Myrtle, MS
9	INF	Paige Smith	R/R	5 ft 5 in (1.65 m)	Jr	Norco	Corona, CA
11	OF	Tate Whitley	L/L	5 ft 5 in (1.65 m)	Sr	Angleton	Angleton, TX
13	RHP	Savannah Diederich	R/R	5 ft 11 in (1.8 m)	Sr	Los Altos	Hacienda Heights, CA
16	INF	Sydney Gutierrez	L/L	5 ft 9 in (1.75 m)	Sr	Pearland; Blinn College	Pearland, TX
17	RHP	Catelyn Riley	R/R	5 ft 10 in (1.78 m)	Fr	Jefferson County	Dandridge, TN
18	RHP	Aynslie Furbush	R/R	5 ft 8 in (1.73 m)	So	Winter Springs	Longwood, FL
21	INF	Bre Roper	L/R	5 ft 8 in (1.73 m)	Sr	Woodstock; Georgia Tech	Woodstock, GA
22	LHP	Anna Borgen	L/L	5 ft 9 in (1.75 m)	Sr	Dallas Christian	Heath, TX
24	INF	Makenna Segal	R/R	5 ft 6 in (1.68 m)	Fr	South Forsyth	Cumming, GA
26	INF	Angelina DeLeon	R/R	5 ft 5 in (1.65 m)	Fr	Calaveras Hills	Valley Springs, CA
27	INF	Maddi Banks	L/R	5 ft 6 in (1.68 m)	Sr	Bettendorf; Virginia Tech	Bettendorf, IA
30	OF	Abbey Latham	RR/R	5 ft 11 in (1.8 m)	Sr	Demopolis	Livingston, AL
31	C	Lexie Brady	R/R	5 ft 9 in (1.75 m)	Fr	O'Gorman Catholic	Sioux Falls, SD
34	OF	Nyomi Jones	L/R	5 ft 7 in (1.7 m)	Jr	Mater Dei	Long Beach, CA
35	RHP	Landyn Bruce	R/R	5 ft 10 in (1.78 m)	So	Great Oak	Temecula, CA
36	RHP	Brooke Vestal	R/R	5 ft 11 in (1.8 m)	Jr	Canyon; Oklahoma	New Braunfels, TX

Head coach

Jamie Trachsel (St. Cloud State)

Assistant coach(es)

Katie Rietkovich Browder (USC Beaufort)
Ryker Chason (LSU)

Legend

- (C) Team captain
- (S) Suspended
- (I) Ineligible
- Injured
- Current redshirt

Roster

== Record vs. conference opponents ==
Date m/dd is for last scheduled game of series. Blank are not scheduled. Blue are home games, otherwise away.

2022 SEC softball records Source: 2022 SEC softball game results, 2022 SEC softball schedule
Team	W–L	ALA	ARK	AUB	FLA	UGA	KEN	LSU	MSU	MIZZ	MISS	SCAR	TENN	TAMU	Team	SR	SW
ALA	16–8		.	.	2–1	2–1	2–1	1–2	3–0	2–1	.	3–0	.	1–2	ALA	6–2	2–0
ARK	19–5	.		3–0	3–0	.	2–1	2–1	.	.	2–1	3–0	2–1	2–1	ARK	8–0	3–0
AUB	11–13	.	0–3		1–2	2–1	1–2	.	2–1	.	.	2–1	0–3	3–0	AUB	4–4	1–2
FLA	13–11	1–2	0–3	2–1		.	.	2–1	2–1	.	3–0	.	1–2	2–1	FLA	5–3	1–1
UGA	12–12	1–2	.	1–2	.		.	1–2	.	2–1	1–2	2–1	2–1	2–1	UGA	4–4	0–0
KEN	13–11	1–2	1–2	2–1	.	.		3–0	2–1	0–3	2–1	2–1	.	.	KEN	5–3	1–1
LSU	13–11	2–1	1–2	.	1–2	2–1	0–3		2–1	.	.	3–0	.	2–1	LSU	5–3	1–1
MSU	10–14	0–3	.	1–2	1–2	.	1–2	1–2		2–1	3–0	.	1–2	.	MSU	2–6	1–1
MIZZ	12–11	1–2	.	.	.	1–2	3–0	.	1–2		0–3	3–0	0–2	3–0	MIZZ	3–5	2–1
MISS	12–12	.	1–2	.	0–3	2–1	1–2	.	0–3	3–0		3–0	2–1	.	MISS	4–4	2–2
SCAR	3–21	0–3	0–3	1–2	.	1–2	1–2	0–3	.	0–3	0–3		.	.	SCAR	0–8	0–5
TENN	15–8	.	1–2	3–0	2–1	1–2	.	.	2–1	2–0	1–2	.		3–0	TENN	5–3	2–0
TAMU	6–18	2–1	1–2	0–3	1–2	1–2	.	1–2	.	0–3	.	.	0–3		TAMU	1–7	0–3
Team	W–L	ALA	ARK	AUB	FLA	UGA	KEN	LSU	MSU	MIZZ	MISS	SCAR	TENN	TAMU	Team	SR	SW

Updated for entire regular season. Tiebrkrs: KEN&FLA>LSU KEN>FLA hd–hd. MISS>UGA hd–hd.

== See also ==
- 2022 Ole Miss Rebels baseball team
