= Sheldon Neuse =

American baseball player (born 1994)

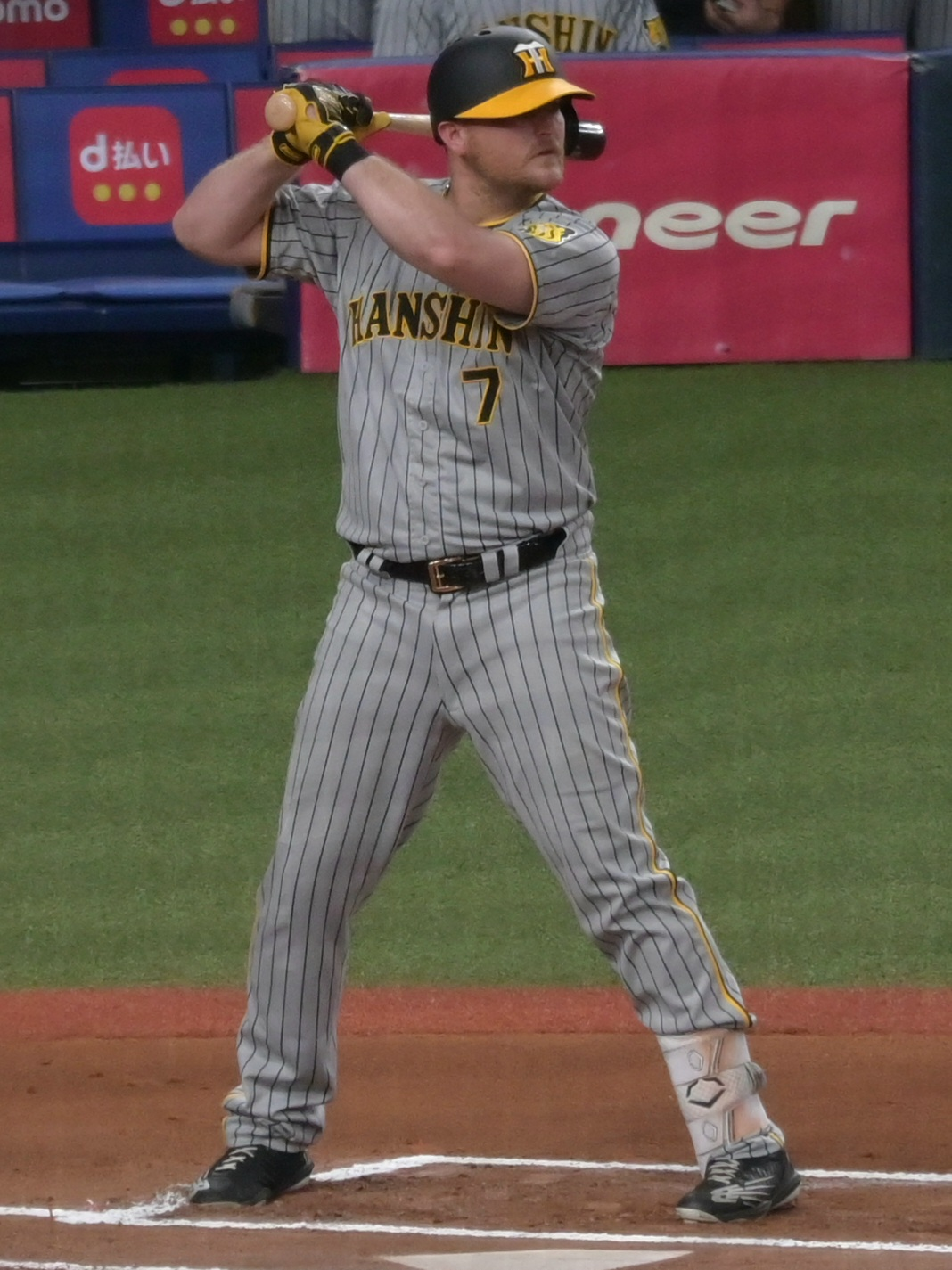
- Neuse with the Hanshin Tigers in 2023
- Infielder
- Born: December 10, 1994 (age 31); Fort Worth, Texas, U.S.
- Batted: Right Threw: Right

Professional debut
- MLB: August 30, 2019, for the Oakland Athletics
- NPB: March 31, 2023, for the Hanshin Tigers

Last appearance
- MLB: September 21, 2022, for the Oakland Athletics
- NPB: September 22, 2024, for the Hanshin Tigers

MLB statistics
- Batting average: .212
- Home runs: 7
- Runs batted in: 37

NPB statistics (through S)
- Batting average: .238
- Home runs: 10
- Runs batted in: 64
- Stats at Baseball Reference

Teams
- Oakland Athletics (2019); Los Angeles Dodgers (2021); Oakland Athletics (2022); Hanshin Tigers (2023–2024)

Career highlights and awards
- NPB: NPB All-Star (2023); Japan Series champion (2023); NCAA: Brooks Wallace Award (2016)

Sheldon Lynn Neuse (/ˈnɔɪzi/ NOY-zee; born December 10, 1994) is an American former professional baseball infielder. He played in Major League Baseball (MLB) for the Los Angeles Dodgers and Oakland Athletics, and in Nippon Professional Baseball (NPB) for the Hanshin Tigers.

== Career ==
=== Amateur career ===
Neuse attended Fossil Ridge High School in Fort Worth, Texas. The Texas Rangers selected him in the 38th round of the 2013 Major League Baseball (MLB) draft, but he did not sign. Neuse enrolled at the University of Oklahoma, where he played college baseball for the Oklahoma Sooners. In 2015, he played collegiate summer baseball with the Harwich Mariners of the Cape Cod Baseball League. As a junior at Oklahoma in 2016, Neuse hit .369/.465/.646 with 10 home runs and 48 runs batted in (RBIs). He won the Brooks Wallace Award, given annually to the best shortstop in college baseball.

=== Washington Nationals ===
The Washington Nationals selected Neuse in the second round of the 2016 MLB draft. He signed with the Nationals and made his professional debut with the Auburn Doubledays. He finished his first professional season with a .230 batting average and one home run. Neuse began 2017 with the Hagerstown Suns.

=== Oakland Athletics ===
On July 16, 2017, the Nationals traded Neuse to the Oakland Athletics, along with Jesús Luzardo and Blake Treinen, in exchange for Sean Doolittle and Ryan Madson. The Athletics assigned him to the Stockton Ports, and he was later promoted to the Midland RockHounds. In 117 total games between Hagerstown, Stockton, and Midland, he posted a .321 batting average, 16 home runs, 79 RBIs, and an .884 OPS. The Athletics assigned Neuse to the Mesa Solar Sox of the Arizona Fall League after the regular season. He played in 22 games for the Solar Sox, posting a .314 batting average along with five home runs and 23 RBIs.

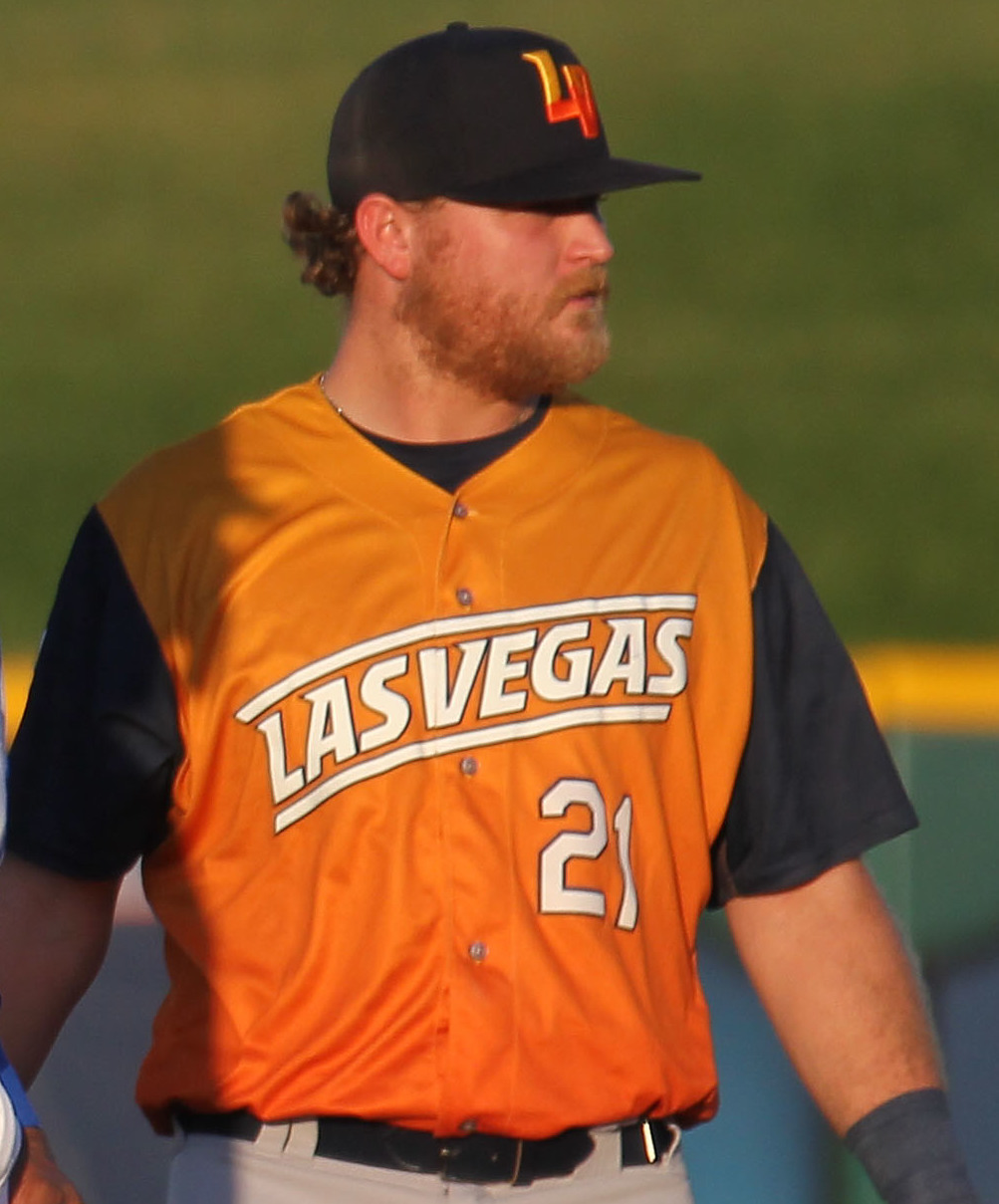
Neuse with the Las Vegas Aviators

In 2018, Neuse played for the Nashville Sounds where he slashed .263/.304/.357 with five home runs and 55 RBIs in 135 games. He opened the 2019 season with the Las Vegas Aviators, hitting .317/.389/.550/.939 with 27 home runs and 102 RBI.

On August 29, 2019, the Athletics selected Neuse's contract and promoted him to the major leagues. He made his major league debut on August 30 versus the New York Yankees, going 0-for-3 with a walk. Two days later Neuse notched his first hit, a two-run double down the right field line off of Ryan Dull of the Yankees. he appeared in 25 games for the Athletics, hitting .250. He did not play in 2020 as a result of the cancellation of the minor league season because of the COVID-19 pandemic, but he spent the season working out at the Athletics alternate training site as part of their 60-man player pool.

=== Los Angeles Dodgers ===
On February 12, 2021, the Athletics traded Neuse and Gus Varland to the Los Angeles Dodgers in exchange for Adam Kolarek and Cody Thomas. On April 22, 2021, Neuse hit his first big league home run off of Emilio Pagán of the San Diego Padres. He played in 33 games for Los Angeles, hitting .182 with three home runs and 4 RBI. He spent most of the season with the Triple-A Oklahoma City Dodgers, where he hit .293 with 13 home runs and 56 RBI in 78 games. He was designated for assignment by the Dodgers on December 1, 2021.

=== Oakland Athletics (second stint) ===
Neuse was claimed off waivers by the Oakland Athletics on March 16, 2022. On April 11, Neuse hit his first career grand slam off of Tampa Bay Rays outfielder Brett Phillips as part of a 3-for-5 day. On September 24, Neuse was designated for assignment. He cleared waivers and was sent outright to the Triple–A Las Vegas Aviators on September 25. Neuse elected free agency following the season on November 10.

=== Hanshin Tigers ===
On November 19, 2022, Neuse signed with the Hanshin Tigers of Nippon Professional Baseball. In Game 7 of the 2023 Japan Series Neuse hit a three–run home run to help the Tigers win their first Japan Series title since 1985.

On November 15, 2023, Neuse re–signed with the Tigers on a one–year, $1.3 million contract for the 2024 season. In 49 games for Hanshin in 2024, he slashed .231/.302/.291 with one home run, eight RBI, and one stolen base. On October 24, 2024, the Tigers announced they would not retain Neuse, making him a free agent.

== Retirement ==
On June 27, 2026, Neuse announced that he would be retiring from professional baseball on his X account. In his post, he also revealed he had started a roofing company.

== Personal life ==
Neuse's brother, Dylan, was teammates with Sheldon at Fossil Ridge. He was drafted by the Minnesota Twins in the 17th round of the 2021 MLB draft and is currently a free agent.

Neuse and his wife Kadence welcomed their first child, a son, in October 2018.
