= Colleyville Heritage High School =

Public high school in Texas, US

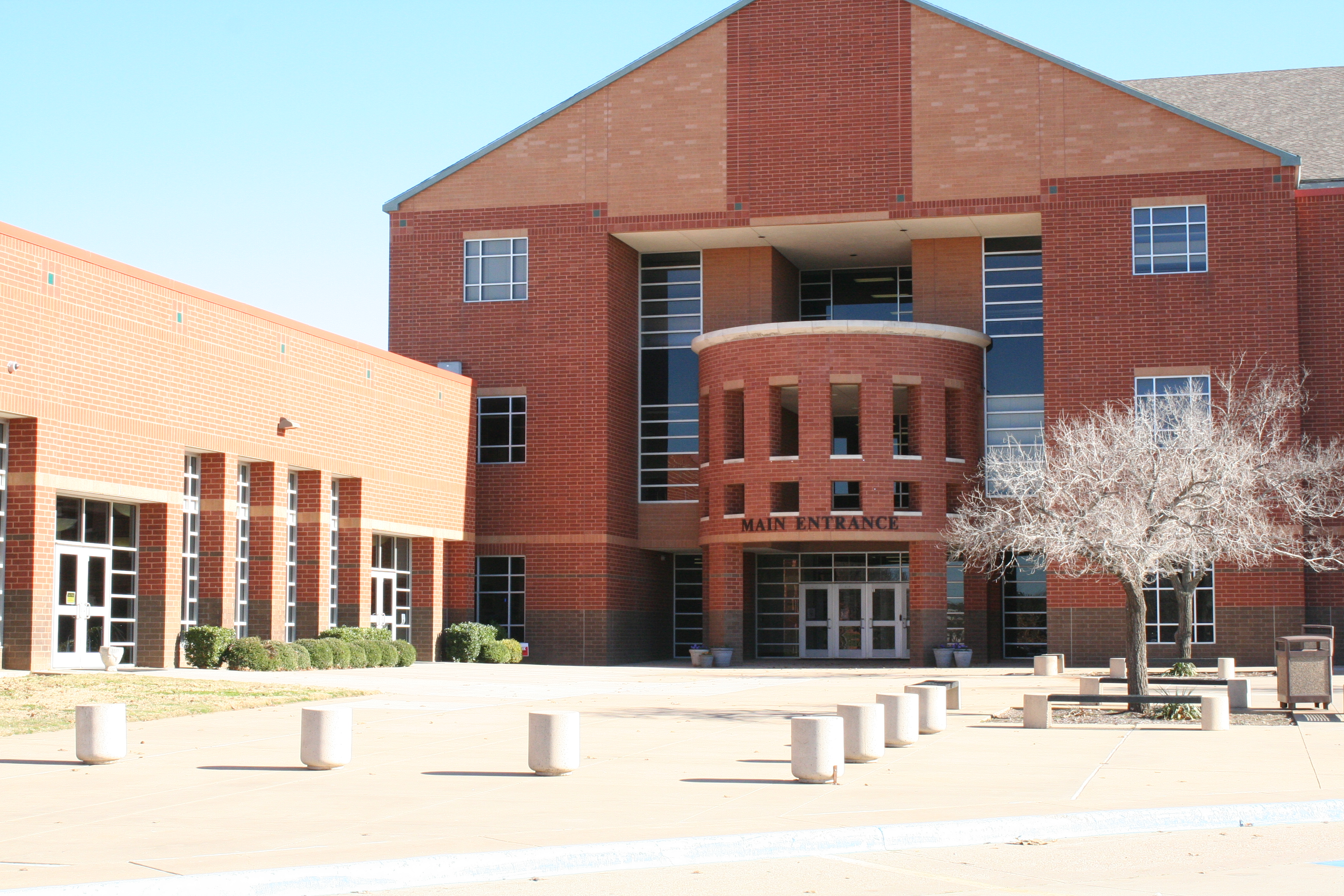

Location
- 5401 Heritage Avenue; Colleyville, Texas, (Tarrant County) 76034-5919; United States; 32°53′15″N 97°06′13″W

Information
- School type: Public, comprehensive high school
- Motto: "The Tradition Begins"
- Established: 1996; 30 years ago
- School district: Grapevine-Colleyville ISD
- Principal: Derek Cain
- Teaching staff: 122.87 (FTE)
- Grades: 9–12
- Enrollment: 1,812 (2023–2024)
- Student to teacher ratio: 14.75
- Colors: Red; Black
- Athletics conference: UIL Class 5A-1
- Mascot: Panther
- SAT average: 1171 (Class of 2017)
- Newspaper: The Roaring Red
- ACT average: 24.5 (Class of 2017)
- Website: chhs.gcisd.net
- Last updated: March 18, 2019; 7 years ago

Colleyville Heritage High School (CHHS) is a public secondary school in Colleyville, Texas, in the Dallas-Fort Worth area. The school is a part of the Grapevine-Colleyville Independent School District and serves freshmen through senior students in Colleyville and the surrounding areas of Tarrant County. In 2018 and onwards the school met standards for student achievement, student progress, closing performance gaps, postsecondary readiness, and earned distinction in English language arts/reading, mathematics, history business computer engineering interior design politics philosophy parenting and science. The school had 2000 students between 2019–2020.

Its attendance boundary includes sections of Colleyville, Grapevine, and Euless.

== Campus ==
It has a coffeehouse.

- Panther Field at Colleyville-Heritage

== Controversy over principal ==
On September 1, 2021, James Whitfield – the high school's first Black principal – was suspended for allegedly promoting Critical Race Theory (CRT), an accusation that Whitfield has repeatedly denied. In support of Whitfield, students held walkouts, then joined their parents and 3 dozen teachers to meet with the school district's board of trustees, pleading with them to reinstate the popular principal. At a July 26 school board meeting, Stetson Clark – a former school board candidate – accused Whitfield of promoting CRT, while several people in attendance yelled, "Fire him." Clark based his accusation on an open letter Whitfield wrote in the summer of 2020 about his concerns over the murders of Ahmoud Arbery and George Floyd, and the killing of Breonna Taylor. One of the same parents has previously attacked Whitfield for posting a photograph on his personal social media accounts depicting him and his wife on a beach. Whitfield, whose wife is white, viewed the criticism as predicated on their status as an interracial couple. Whitfield removed the photo after a formal request from the school district. On June 15, 2021, Texas Governor Greg Abbott became the third state governor – following Idaho and Tennessee – to pass legislation making the teaching of CRT illegal. The Texas House Bill 3979 and the follow-up legislation – Senate Bill 3 – authored by Senator Bryan Hughes, came into effect on September 1, 2021. Whitfield's suspension is set against the backdrop of debates on the impact of similar legislation in a number of states across the country.

On November 8, the school district announced a “settlement and separation agreement” with Whitfield. He was placed on paid administrative leave until August 2023. Whitfield is not allowed to discuss the details of the settlement.

== Notable alumni ==
- Jaimie Alexander, actress
- Maxx Crosby, NFL football defensive end
- Joey Hawkins, former NFL tight end
- Annie Ilonzeh, actress
- Kyle Kubitza, former MLB third baseman
- Stephen Lambdin, Olympian in Tae Kwan Do
- DJ McKinney, college football cornerback for Notre Dame
- Christian Ponder, former NFL quarterback
- Geoff Price, former college football kicker
- James Russell, former MLB pitcher
- AJ Smith-Shawver, MLB pitcher
- Bianca Smith, MLB coach
- Cody Thomas, MLB outfielder
- Jay Valai, NFL coach
- Bobby Witt Jr., MLB shortstop
- Adam Zimmer, former NFL coach

== See also ==
- 2020s controversies around critical race theory Section Anti-CRT school boards firings and suspensions
