= Cody Thomas =

American baseball player (born 1994)

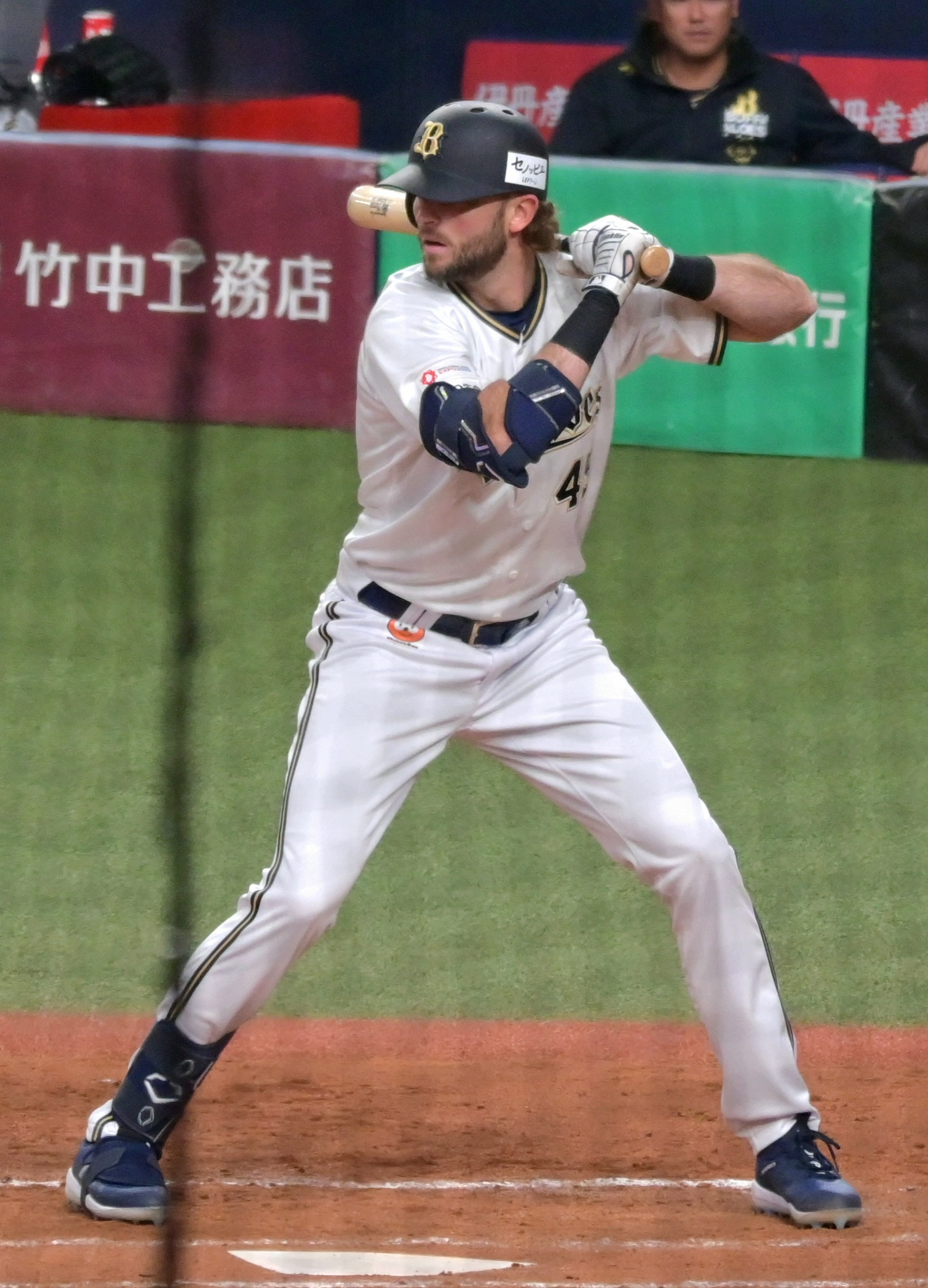
- Thomas with the Orix Buffaloes in 2024

Cleburne Railroaders – No. 23
- Outfielder
- Born: October 8, 1994 (age 31); Colleyville, Texas, U.S.
- Bats: Left Throws: Right

Professional debut
- MLB: September 1, 2022, for the Oakland Athletics
- NPB: July 14, 2024, for the Orix Buffaloes

MLB statistics (through 2023 season)
- Batting average: .250
- Home runs: 1
- Runs batted in: 2

NPB statistics (through 2024 season)
- Batting average: .000
- Home runs: 0
- Runs batted in: 0
- Stats at Baseball Reference

Teams
- Oakland Athletics (2022–2023); Orix Buffaloes (2024)

Cody Ryan Thomas (born October 8, 1994) is an American professional baseball outfielder for the Cleburne Railroaders of the American Association of Professional Baseball. He was a multi-sport athlete in college, playing both college baseball and college football at the University of Oklahoma. He has previously played in Major League Baseball (MLB) for the Oakland Athletics and in Nippon Professional Baseball (NPB) for the Orix Buffaloes.

== Early life ==
Thomas attended Colleyville Heritage High School in Colleyville, Texas. In football, he passed for 3,057 yards with 32 touchdowns as a junior and 4,154 yards with 51 touchdowns as a senior. Thomas was rated as a four-star recruit and was ranked among the top quarterbacks in his class. He committed to the University of Oklahoma to play college football.

The New York Yankees selected Thomas in the 30th round of the 2013 Major League Baseball draft, but he did not sign professionally.

College recruiting
| Name | Hometown | School | Height | Weight | 40^{‡} | Commit date |
|---|---|---|---|---|---|---|
| Cody Thomas; QB | Colleyville, Texas | Colleyville Heritage HS | 6 ft 4 in (1.93 m) | 220 lb (100 kg) | 4.5 | May 17, 2012 |
| Cody Thomas; QB | Recruit ratings: Scout: Rivals: (83) | | | | | |
Overall recruit ranking:
Note: In many cases, Scout, Rivals, 247Sports, On3, and ESPN may conflict in their listings of height and weight.; In these cases, the average was taken. ESPN grades are on a 100-point scale.; Sources:

== College career ==
=== Football ===
In 2013, Thomas took a redshirt in his first year with the Oklahoma Sooners football team.

In 2014, as a redshirt freshman, Thomas played in four games before making his first collegiate start against the Texas Tech Red Raiders. Oklahoma starting quarterback Trevor Knight was sidelined with a neck injury that he sustained the previous week. On November 15, Thomas led Oklahoma to a 42–30 victory on the road, defeating opposing quarterback Patrick Mahomes. Thomas went 10-for-20 passing for 133 yards with one touchdown and three interceptions. Thomas also ran for 103 yards on eight carries and one touchdown. The following week, Thomas made his second straight start. After a 90-minute weather delay before the game, Oklahoma running back Samaje Perine rushed for 427 yards on 34 rushes along with six touchdowns in a 44–7 victory over the Kansas Jayhawks, breaking the NCAA FBS single-game rushing record. Thomas completed just three of 13 passes for 39 yards and added 21 yards on the ground in the poor conditions. On December 6, Thomas went 10-for-17 passing for 120 yards and one touchdown in a 35–38 overtime loss to the Oklahoma State Cowboys. For the season, he completed 30-of-66 passes for 342 yards with two touchdowns and four interceptions.

In 2015, Thomas competed with Baker Mayfield and Trevor Knight for the starting job. Mayfield won the job, with Thomas appearing in three games as a backup. In January 2016, he left the football team to focus on his baseball career.

=== Statistics ===
| Season | Team | Games | | Passing | | | | | | | Rushing | | | |
| Season | Team | GP | GS | Cmp | Att | Pct | Yds | TD | Int | Rtg | Att | Yds | Avg | TD |
|---|---|---|---|---|---|---|---|---|---|---|---|---|---|---|
| 2013 | Oklahoma | Redshirted | | | | | | | | | | | | |
| 2014 | Oklahoma | 7 | 3 | 30 | 66 | 45.5 | 342 | 2 | 4 | 86.9 | 23 | 141 | 6.1 | 1 |
| 2015 | Oklahoma | 3 | 0 | 1 | 3 | 33.0 | 1 | 0 | 0 | 36.1 | 0 | 0 | 0 | 0 |
| Career | | 10 | 3 | 31 | 69 | 44.9 | 343 | 2 | 4 | 84.7 | 23 | 141 | 6.1 | 1 |

=== Baseball ===
Thomas appeared in 14 games for the Oklahoma Sooners baseball team as freshman in 2014, recording one hit in 12 at-bats. He did not play in 2015 while focusing on football. He returned to baseball in 2016, appearing in 40 games. He hit .299/.354/.556 with six home runs and 27 runs batted in (RBI) over 117 at-bats.

== Professional career ==
=== Los Angeles Dodgers ===
The Los Angeles Dodgers selected Thomas in the 13th round of the 2016 MLB draft. He signed with the Dodgers and made his professional debut with the Arizona League Dodgers. After seven games he was promoted to the Ogden Raptors. Thomas was awarded the Joe Bauman Home Run Award for finishing the 2016 season with 19 home runs among short-season A and rookie ball players. On August 3, 2017, Thomas set Great Lake Loons' single-game records with 3 homers, 7 RBIs, and 12 total bases. In the same game, Thomas and teammate Carlos Rincon both hit back to back home runs twice in the same inning, which only happened one other time in the history of professional baseball, by Bret Boone and Mike Cameron of the Seattle Mariners in 2002.

With the Rancho Cucamonga Quakes in 2018, Thomas was named to the post-season California League All-Star team. In 127 games, he hit .285 with 19 homers and 87 RBI. In 2019, he began the season with the Tulsa Drillers and was selected to the mid-season Texas League All-Star Game. Thomas did not play in a game in 2020 due to the cancellation of the minor league season because of the COVID-19 pandemic.

=== Oakland Athletics ===
On February 12, 2021, the Dodgers traded Thomas to the Oakland Athletics along with Adam Kolarek in exchange for Sheldon Neuse and Gus Varland. Thomas spent the year with the Triple-A Las Vegas Aviators, slashing .289/.363/.665 with 18 home runs and 52 RBI in 59 games. On November 19, 2021, the Athletics' added Thomas to their 40-man roster to protect him from the Rule 5 draft.

Thomas underwent achilles surgery in the offseason and missed the majority of the 2022 season in recovery. Thomas began a rehab assignment with the rookie-level Arizona Complex League Athletics before returning to Triple-A Las Vegas. In 4 games, he went 4-for-15 (.267) with a home run, two doubles, one walk, and seven strikeouts. On September 1, 2022, Thomas was promoted to the major leagues for the first time. He made his Major League Baseball debut the same day against the Washington Nationals, where he recorded his first career hit. Thomas finished the season 8-for-30 (.267) in 10 games played. He was designated for assignment on December 16, following the signing of Trevor May. Thomas cleared waivers and was sent outright to Las Vegas on December 20.

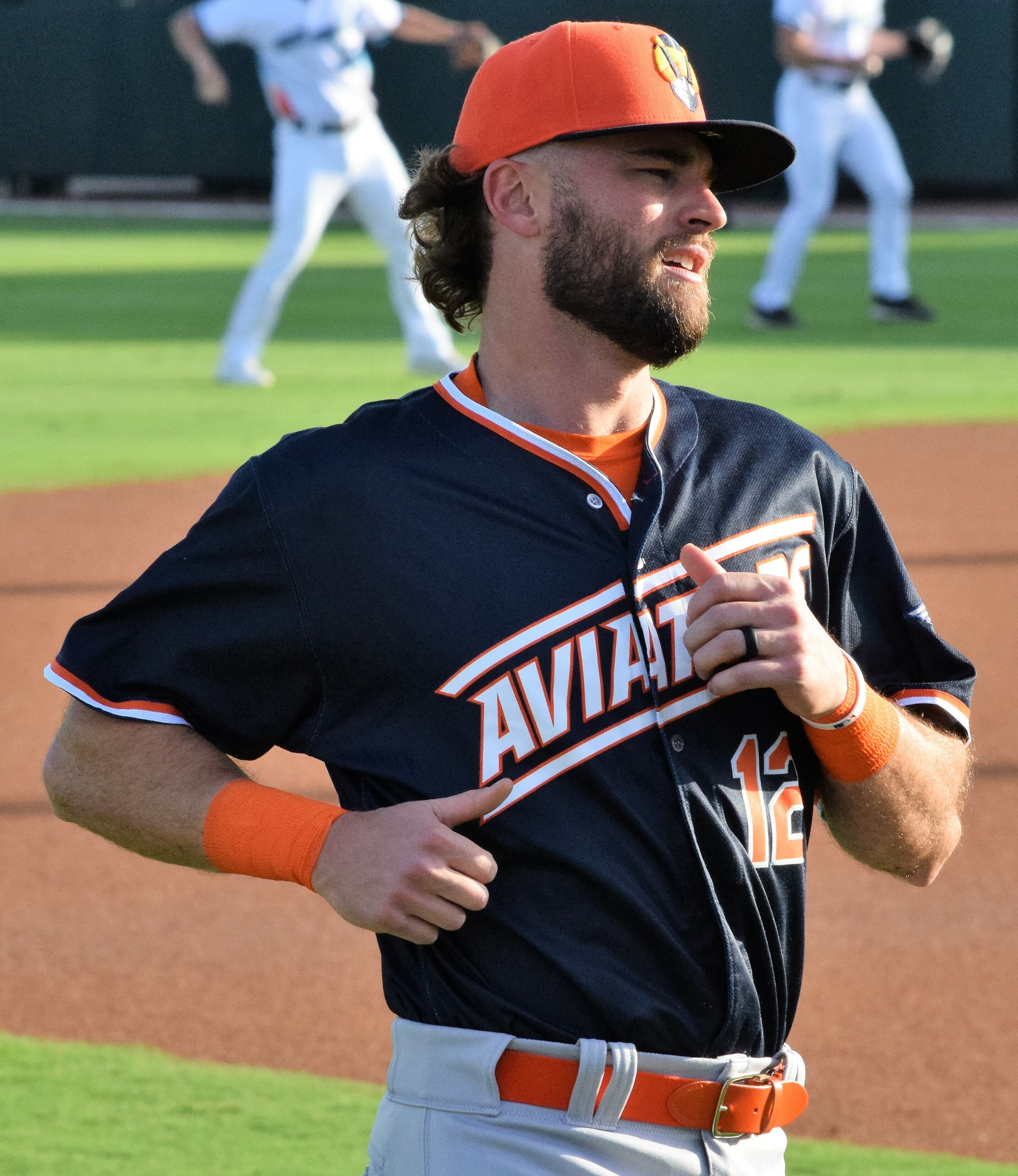
Thomas with the Las Vegas Aviators in 2023

Thomas began the 2023 season with Las Vegas, where he hit for the cycle on Opening Day against the Reno Aces. In 74 games, he batted .308/.367/.576 with 17 home runs and 79 RBI. On July 7, 2023, Thomas was selected to the major league roster. On July 19, Thomas hit his first MLB home run, coming off Brayan Bello of the Boston Red Sox. In 19 games for Oakland, he batted .238/.304/.381 with 1 home run and 2 RBI. On August 30, Thomas was removed from the 40-man roster and sent outright to Las Vegas. On October 2, Thomas elected free agency.

=== Orix Buffaloes ===
On January 9, 2024, Thomas signed a contract with the Orix Buffaloes of Nippon Professional Baseball. In 10 games for Orix, he went 0-for-18 with 7 strikeouts. On October 23, the Buffaloes announced that they would not bring Thomas back in 2025, making him a free agent.

=== Long Island Ducks ===
On January 21, 2025, Thomas signed a minor league contract with the Texas Rangers. He was released by the Rangers prior to the start of the season on March 26.

On May 1, 2025, Thomas signed with the Long Island Ducks of the Atlantic League of Professional Baseball. In 106 appearances for Long Island, Thomas batted .233/.323/.446 with 18 home runs, 70 RBI, and 15 stolen bases.

=== Cleburne Railroaders ===
On October 14, 2025, Thomas signed with the Cleburne Railroaders of the American Association of Professional Baseball.

== Personal life ==
Thomas' brother-in-law is Kansas City Royals shortstop and fellow Colleyville native Bobby Witt Jr. Thomas is married to Witt's older sister Shaley.

Thomas' parents are Pete and Lisa Thomas.
