= Adam Kolarek =

American baseball player (born 1989)

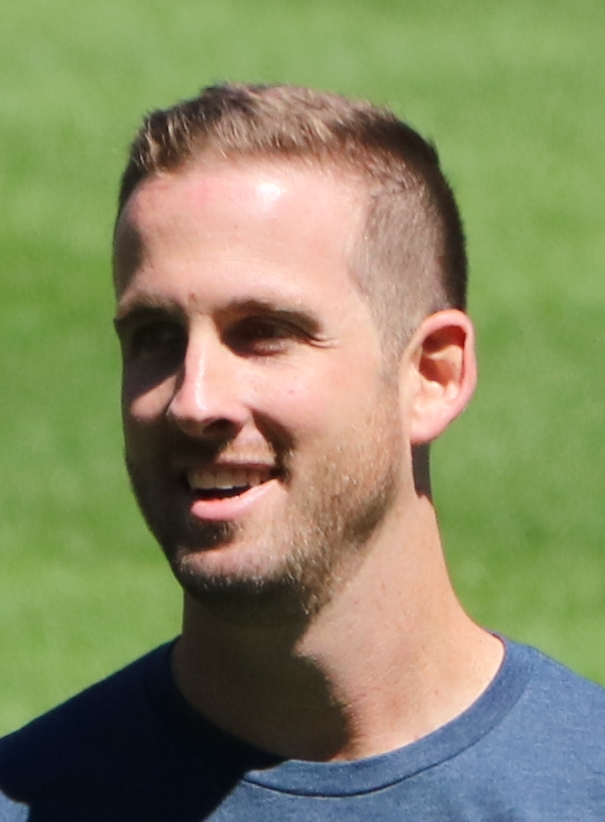
- Kolarek with the Rays in 2018
- Pitcher
- Born: January 14, 1989 (age 37); Baltimore, Maryland, U.S.
- Batted: Left Threw: Left

MLB debut
- June 29, 2017, for the Tampa Bay Rays

Last MLB appearance
- August 26, 2023, for the New York Mets

MLB statistics
- Win–loss record: 11–4
- Earned run average: 3.62
- Strikeouts: 101
- Stats at Baseball Reference

Teams
- Tampa Bay Rays (2017–2019); Los Angeles Dodgers (2019–2020); Oakland Athletics (2021–2022); Los Angeles Dodgers (2023); New York Mets (2023)

Career highlights and awards
- World Series champion (2020)

Adam John Kolarek (born January 14, 1989) is an American former professional baseball relief pitcher. He played in Major League Baseball (MLB) for the Tampa Bay Rays, Oakland Athletics, Los Angeles Dodgers, and New York Mets.

Kolarek played college baseball for the Maryland Terrapins and was drafted by the New York Mets in the 11th round of the 2010 MLB draft. He made his MLB debut in 2017.

== Amateur career ==
Kolarek was born in Baltimore, Maryland, to Frank Kolarek and Dorothy Kolarek. His father played baseball as a catcher at the University of Maryland from 1973 to 1975, and then played professionally in the minor leagues for the Oakland Athletics organization from 1976 to 1979, reaching Class AA with the Ogden A's. He has three sisters.

He attended Catonsville High School. He was a pitcher and outfielder for the Comets. In 2006 as a junior he was named First-Team All-Metro as an outfielder. In 2007 as a senior he batted .397 and was 8-2 with a 1.05 ERA as a pitcher, and was named First-Team All-Metro as a pitcher and a Brooks Robinson All Star.

He then attended the University of Maryland, where he played from 2008 to 2010. In 2008 as a freshman, he was 2–1 with a 4.26 ERA in 21 relief appearances. In 2009 as a sophomore, he was 2–1 with a 4.68 ERA in 26 games (four starts), and in 2010 as a junior, he was 1–4 with a 6.06 ERA in 13 games (five starts). Ranked as one of the top 50 lefthanders in the country, Kolarek was drafted by the Mets in the 11th round of the 2010 Major League Baseball draft.

== Professional career ==
=== New York Mets ===
Kolarek pitched for the Kingsport Mets and Brooklyn Cyclones in 2010, and went 2–1 with a 3.13 ERA in 22 relief appearances between them. In 37 1/3 innings, he allowed 19 hits and had 45 strikeouts. Had he qualified, he would have led Kingsport in WHIP, with a mark of 0.643.

He pitched for the Savannah Sand Gnats and St. Lucie Mets in 2011, going 7–1 with a 2.85 ERA in 26 games (one start). His 1.000 winning percentage for Savannah tied for the team and league lead.

In 2012, Kolarek went 1–3 with 18 saves (fifth in the league), 70 strikeouts (11.1 strikeouts per 9 innings; 6th in the league), and a 2.37 ERA in 44 games (57 innings) for St. Lucie, earning a spot on the Florida State League All-Star team. He also pitched 6 games for the Binghamton Mets, and posted a 2–0 record with a 5.68 ERA. He was an MiLB.com Organization All-Star and a FSL Post-Season All-Star that year. He led St. Lucie in games and games finished that year. He led the entire league in saves. In the Arizona Fall League, he had a 2.92 ERA in nine games for the Surprise Saguaros.

In 2013, he was 3–3 with a 1.71 ERA in 44 relief appearances for Binghamton. In his first taste of Triple-A, Kolarek had an 11.25 ERA in 2 appearances for the Las Vegas 51s as well.

Kolarek spent some time with the big league club during 2014 spring training. Back with Binghamton for that year's regular season, his ERA was 6.07 in 48 relief appearances, though he had a 1.12 mark in six games for the Gigantes de Carolina in the Puerto Rican Winter League.

He spent 2015 with Binghamton. He tied for fourth in the Eastern League with 51 appearances. He then pitched for the Gigantes de Carolina in the Puerto Rican League for a second consecutive year.

=== Tampa Bay Rays ===
On October 23, 2015, Kolarek signed a minor league contract with the Baltimore Orioles organization and was assigned to the Double-A Bowie Baysox.

On December 10, 2015, the Tampa Bay Rays selected Kolarek in the minor league phase of the Rule 5 draft. He split the 2016 season between the Triple-A Durham Bulls and the Double-A Montgomery Biscuits, posting a 3-4 record and 3.13 ERA in 47 appearances between the two teams, holding left-handers to limited lefties to a .143 average. Kolarek elected free agency following the season on November 7, 2016.

=== Atlanta Braves ===
On November 19, 2016, Kolarek signed a minor league contract with the Atlanta Braves organization that included an invitation to Spring Training. He did not make the team out of spring and was released on March 24, 2017.

=== Tampa Bay Rays (second stint) ===
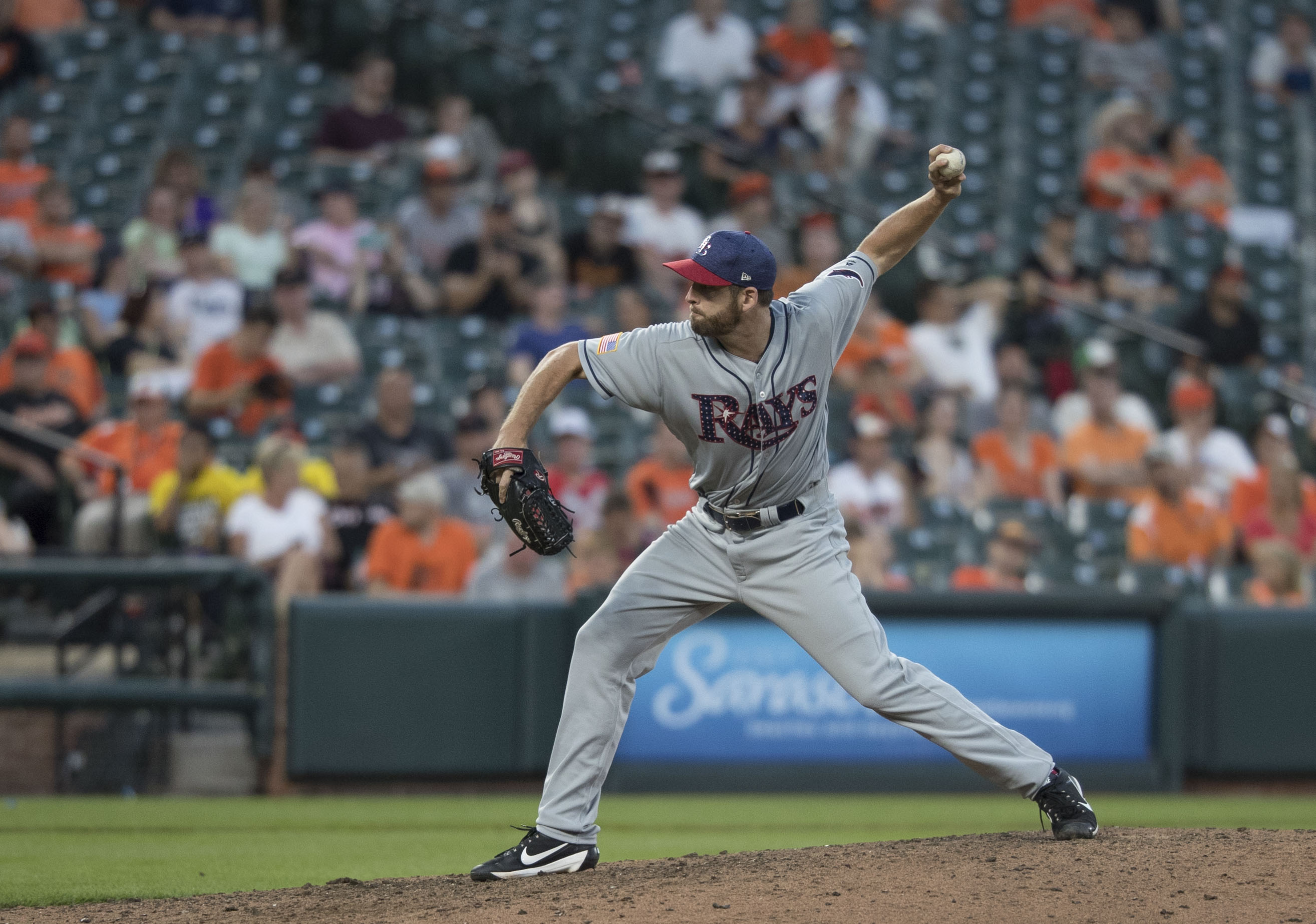
Adam Kolarek pitching against the Baltimore Orioles on July 1, 2017.

On March 27, 2017, Kolarek signed a minor league contract to return to the Tampa Bay Rays organization. He was assigned to Triple-A Durham to begin the year. Kolarek was called up to the majors for the first time on June 28, 2017. At 28 years old, after 320 minor league games over eight minor league seasons, Kolarek made his major league debut at PNC Park, throwing 1.1 innings, allowing one hit and striking out one on 14 pitches. On September 3, Kolarek was designated for assignment by Tampa Bay after struggling to a 6.48 ERA across 12 appearances in his rookie year. He was outrighted to Durham the next day.

Kolarek did not make the team out of spring in 2018, and was assigned to Triple-A Durham to start the season. On July 6, 2018, Kolarek was selected to the active roster after posting a 1.70 ERA in 29 games in Durham. In 2018, he made 31 appearances with two saves and a 3.93 ERA, and 10.5 strikeouts per 9 innings. In 2019 with the Rays, he was 4–2 with a 3.95 ERA in 54 games.

=== Los Angeles Dodgers ===
On July 31, 2019, the Rays traded Kolarek to the Los Angeles Dodgers in exchange for minor leaguer Niko Hulsizer. He pitched in 26 games for the Dodgers in 2019, with two wins and a stellar 0.77 ERA in 11 2/3 innings. In 2019 he allowed only 19.6% of inherited runners to score (the seventh-best percentage among Major League relievers), and had the 3rd-highest ground ball percentage among big league relievers, at 66.9%.

In the pandemic-shortened 2020 season, Kolarek was 3–0 with one save. He appeared in 20 games and allowed only two runs in 19 innings for an amazing 0.95 ERA. He held batters to a batting line of .164/.208/.224. He appeared in four games in the postseason, working 3 1/3 innings, allowing three runs as the Dodgers won the 2020 World Series. With the victory, Kolarek earned his first ever World Series championship.

=== Oakland Athletics ===
On February 12, 2021, Kolarek was traded to the Oakland Athletics (along with Cody Thomas) in return for Sheldon Neuse and Gus Varland. Kolarek made 12 appearances for Oakland in 2021, but struggled to an 8.00 ERA with 4 strikeouts in 9.0 innings pitched.

In 2022, Kolarek pitched in 15 games for the Athletics, logging a 4.58 ERA with 9 strikeouts in 17.2 innings of work. He was designated for assignment by Oakland on June 30, 2022. On July 1, Kolarek cleared waivers and was sent outright to the Triple-A Las Vegas Aviators. On October 13, Kolarek elected free agency.

In his major league career through 2022, he kept left-handed batters to a batting line of .190/.243/.260. Between 2017 and 2022, he primarily threw an 89 mph sinker and a 79 mph slider, while also throwing an 83 mph changeup and a 92 mph fourseam fastball.

=== Los Angeles Dodgers (second stint) ===
On December 15, 2022, Kolarek signed a minor league contract with the Los Angeles Dodgers organization. He was assigned to the Triple–A Oklahoma City Dodgers to begin the 2023 season, where he pitched in 21 games and posted a 2.18 ERA with 12 strikeouts in 20 2/3 innings of work. On June 11, Kolarek was selected to the major league roster. He tossed a scoreless 1 1/3 innings of relief against the Philadelphia Phillies, striking out two. On June 14, he was designated for assignment. He cleared waivers and was sent outright to Triple–A Oklahoma City on June 17.

=== New York Mets (second stint) ===
On August 1, 2023, Kolarek and Phil Bickford were traded to the New York Mets in exchange for cash considerations. After 6 appearances for the Triple–A Syracuse Mets, his contract was selected to the major league roster on August 19. In 4 appearances for the Mets, he tossed 4 2/3 scoreless innings of relief with five strikeouts. On August 27, Kolarek was designated for assignment by the Mets. On August 30, Kolarek cleared waivers and elected free agency in lieu of an outright assignment.

=== Atlanta Braves (second stint) ===
On August 31, 2023, Kolarek signed a minor league contract with the Atlanta Braves organization. In 7 games for the Triple–A Gwinnett Stripers, he struggled to a 9.82 ERA with 7 strikeouts across 7 1/3 innings of work. Kolarek elected free agency following the season on November 6.

=== Los Angeles Angels ===
On November 26, 2023, Kolarek signed a one-year, $900,000 contract with the Los Angeles Angels. On January 6, 2024, he was removed from the 40-man roster and sent outright to the Triple–A Salt Lake Bees. In 31 games for the Bees, Kolarek struggled to a 6.97 ERA with 33 strikeouts across 31 innings pitched. He was released by the Angels organization on August 13.

On April 3, 2025, Kolarek announced his retirement from baseball on the Glenn Clark Radio show.

== Personal ==
His father, Frank Kolarek, played in the minor leagues in the 1970s and 1980s. Adam married Melanie on November 11, 2017.
