= Panther Field =

Ballpark in Duncanville, Texas, US

Coordinates: 32.6593°N 96.93027°W

Panther Field is a ballpark located in Duncanville, Texas, and was the home of the Texas Collegiate League Duncanville Deputies from 2006 to 2007. The venue holds a capacity of 1,500. It is situated next to the Duncanville High School. The stadium was the home for the Major League Soccer team Dallas Burn in the 1999, 2001, and 2004 MLS seasons.
