= Joey Hawkins =

American football player (born 1981)

No. 46
- Position: Tight end

Personal information
- Born: December 16, 1981 (age 44); Gilmer, Texas, U.S.
- Listed height: 6 ft 9 in (2.06 m)
- Listed weight: 252 lb (114 kg)

Career information
- College: Southeast Missouri State (2000); Texas Tech (2001–2004)
- NFL draft: 2005: undrafted

Career history
- Indianapolis Colts (2005–2006)*; → Rhein Fire (2006)
- * Offseason or practice squad member only

Charles Joseph Hawkins (born December 16, 1981) is an American former football tight end for the Indianapolis Colts of the National Football League. Standing 6 feet 9 inches (2.06 m) tall, he was one of the tallest players in Colts history. A multi-sport athlete, he played both college football and basketball at Texas Tech, and played baseball as well as his third sport at Colleyville Heritage High School.

== Early life ==
Hawkins went to Colleyville Heritage High School in Texas, where played varsity football, basketball, and baseball. He was a tight end on the Panthers football team. In baseball, he was a pitcher.

In basketball, Hawkins was drafted to the all-district first team and averaged a double-double. During his senior year, Colleville Heritage made it its first-ever playoffs. In 1999–2000, he averaged 9.7 points, 8.9 rebounds, and 2.1 blocked shots per game.

== College career ==
Hawkins played college football and basketball at Texas Tech. He walked on to the football team at Texas Tech University in 2001, after transferring from Southeast Missouri State.

As a football tight end who mainly blocked, Hawkins had 17 career catches for 214 yards. His final college football game was the 2004 Holiday Bowl on December 30, when Texas Tech defeated the No. 4-ranked California Golden Bears, 45–31.

On December 31, 2004, Hawkins joined the Red Raiders basketball team for the first time after he was no longer eligible to play football. He was the fifth football player to play basketball under coach Bob Knight, who had been looking to strengthen the Raiders' inside defense. Hawkins scored 11 points in 15 appearances.

== Professional career ==
In April 2005, Hawkins was scouted and signed as an undrafted player with the Indianapolis Colts in the NFL, after basketball coach Knight recommended him. At the time, he was one of the two tallest players in the history of the Colts, along with teammate Jim Newton who was also 6 ft 9 in (2.06 m). In 2006, he was re-signed to the Colts practice squad.
