= Gus Varland =

American baseball player (born 1996)

New York Mets
- Pitcher
- Born: November 6, 1996 (age 30); Maplewood, Minnesota, U.S.
- Bats: Left Throws: Right

MLB debut
- March 30, 2023, for the Milwaukee Brewers

MLB statistics (through 2026 season)
- Win–loss record: 4–3
- Earned run average: 5.54
- Strikeouts: 79
- Stats at Baseball Reference

Teams
- Milwaukee Brewers (2023); Los Angeles Dodgers (2023–2024); Chicago White Sox (2024); Washington Nationals (2026)

Augustus James Varland (born November 6, 1996) is an American professional baseball pitcher for the New York Mets of Major League Baseball (MLB). He has previously played in MLB for the Milwaukee Brewers, Los Angeles Dodgers, Chicago White Sox, and New York Mets

== Career ==
Varland graduated from North Senior High School in North St. Paul, Minnesota and played college baseball at Concordia University, St. Paul. In 31 games at college, he was 16–7 with a 3.04 ERA. He also played in summer leagues for the Utica Blue Sox of the Perfect Game Collegiate Baseball League and Willmar Stingers of the Northwoods League.

=== Oakland Athletics ===
The Oakland Athletics selected Varland in the 14th round of the 2018 MLB draft. He split his first professional season between the rookie-level Arizona League Athletics, Low-A Vermont Lake Monsters, and Single-A Beloit Snappers.

He made five appearances (four starts) with the High-A Stockton Ports in 2019, posting a 2–1 record and 2.39 ERA with 27 strikeouts in 26 1/3 innings pitched. Varland did not play in a game in 2020 due to the cancellation of the minor league season because of the COVID-19 pandemic.

=== Los Angeles Dodgers ===
The Athletics traded Varland and Sheldon Neuse to the Los Angeles Dodgers in exchange for Adam Kolarek and Cody Thomas on February 12, 2021. Varland spent the year with the Double-A Tulsa Drillers, pitching to a 1–4 record and 5.71 ERA with 22 strikeouts in 34 2/3 innings of work.

On May 6, 2022, Varland was the starting pitcher in a game against the Wichita Wind Surge, for whom his brother Louie was the starting pitcher. He spent the entire 2022 season with Tulsa, struggling to a 4–4 record and 6.11 ERA with 85 strikeouts in 70 2/3 innings pitched.

=== Milwaukee Brewers ===
On December 7, 2022, the Milwaukee Brewers selected Varland in the Rule 5 Draft and he made the Brewers' Opening Day roster out of spring training. Varland made his MLB debut on Opening Day (March 30), pitching in relief against the Chicago Cubs. He struck out the first batter he faced, Miles Mastrobuoni. Through seven appearances for Milwaukee, Varland held a 2.25 ERA with five strikeouts in nine innings pitched. In a May 15 appearance against the St. Louis Cardinals, he allowed nine earned runs on six hits and three walks with one strikeout. He was designated for assignment by the Brewers the following day.

=== Los Angeles Dodgers (second stint) ===
On May 22, 2023, Varland cleared waivers and was returned to the Dodgers organization. He was assigned to the Triple-A Oklahoma City Dodgers, where he made 30 appearances and logged a 2.16 ERA with 39 strikeouts in 33 1/3 innings pitched. On August 15, the Dodgers selected Varland's contract, adding him to the major league roster. On August 23, Varland recorded his first career victory in the major leagues, beating the Cleveland Guardians. He pitched in eight games for Los Angeles, allowing four earned runs in 11 2/3 innings. On September 10, Varland was placed on the injured list with right knee inflammation. He was transferred to the 60–day injured list two days later, ending his season.

Varland began the 2024 on the major league roster for the Dodgers season opening series in Seoul, South Korea and pitched to one batter before he was optioned back to Oklahoma City to start the minor league season. He made seven appearances in the majors, allowing two earned runs in six innings and 28 appearances for Oklahoma City for a 7.99 ERA before he was designated for assignment on July 30.

=== Chicago White Sox ===
On August 2, 2024, Varland was claimed off waivers by the Chicago White Sox. In 19 appearances for the White Sox, he compiled a 1-0 record and 3.54 ERA with 24 strikeouts across 20 1/3 innings pitched.

Varland was optioned to the Triple-A Charlotte Knights to begin the 2025 season, where he recorded a 5.06 ERA with nine strikeouts in 5 1/3 innings pitched across seven appearances. Varland was designated for assignment by Chicago on August 7, 2025.

=== Washington Nationals ===
On August 11, 2025, Varland was claimed off waivers by the Arizona Diamondbacks. He did not make an appearance for the organization prior to the conclusion of the season. On January 15, 2026, Varland was designated for assignment by the Diamondbacks.

On January 22, 2026, Varland was claimed off waivers by the Washington Nationals. Varland pitched 33 innings for the Nationals during the 2026 season, tallying a 6.55 ERA. The Nationals designated him for assignment on November 17, 2026.

=== New York Mets ===
On November 20, 2026, Varland was claimed off waivers by the New York Mets.

== Personal life ==
Varland's younger brother, Louis, plays in MLB for the Toronto Blue Jays.

== See also ==
- Rule 5 draft results
