= Center for Health and Homeland Security =

The University of Maryland Center for Health and Homeland Security (CHHS) is a nonprofit consulting group and academic center committed to developing plans, policies, and strategies for government, corporate, and institutional clients to ensure the safety of citizens in the event of natural or man-made catastrophes. Michael Greenberger, JD, a professor at the University of Maryland School of Law, is the CHHS founder and director.

== History ==
Shortly after the September 11 terrorist attacks, University of Maryland, Baltimore, President David J. Ramsay called on Professor Greenberger to create a center that could bolster the university's extensive work in scientific research, policy development, and legal analysis related to homeland security. On May 15, 2002, CHHS officially opened its doors.

The scope of work grew soon after, and by summer 2003 the Maryland Emergency Management Agency asked CHHS to develop a manual to guide Maryland state agencies through the COOP plan writing process. Next, Howard County, MD, the Baltimore City Health Department, and the University of Maryland Medical Center tapped CHHS for its expertise in emergency planning. In October 2005, CHHS was awarded a $1.484 million grant to run nationwide DHS COOP training program, and CHHS teams have since delivered the course to first responders in locations as far away as California, Alaska, and Guam. In fall 2007, CHHS organized and hosted the first national conference on emergency preparedness for vulnerable populations. Professor Greenberger was appointed to the Maryland governor's Emergency Management Advisory Council in 2008, the same year CHHS tested COOP plans drafted for the Maryland Judiciary.

Today, the list of CHHS clients includes dozens of institutions and agencies from jurisdictions across the country.
