= Calaveras Hills High School =

Public high school in California, United States

Location
- 1331 East Calaveras Boulevard; Milpitas, Santa Clara, California 95035-5707; United States; 37°26′15″N 121°52′58″W

Information
- School district: Milpitas Unified School District (MUSD)
- Superintendent: Cary Matsuoka
- Principal: Carl Stice
- Teaching staff: 9.00 (FTE)
  - Other: 1331 E. Calaveras Blvd Milpitas, CA 95035 Principal: Katie Martinez
- Student to teacher ratio: 11.89
- Campus size: Medium
- Colors: Burgundy & White
- Nickname: Cal Hills
- Team name: Mustangs
- Accreditation: Western Association of Schools and Colleges (WASC)
- Website: chhs.schoolloop.com

Calaveras Hills High School (CHHS) is one of the three high schools of Milpitas, California. Calaveras Hills High School works with students who need an alternative form of education. Calaveras Hills High is referred to as "Cal Hills" by students and the community. Cal Hills is the most successful alternative school in the state. Test scores for the STAR test rose hundreds of points from 500+ to 714. Cal Hills often has a waiting list to get into the program.

Past principals include Fleming Matson, Don Denton, Mike Madalinski, Paul Cauchi, Michael Hermosillo, Katie Martinez, and Alecia Myers. The Current superintendent is Cary Matsuoka.
