= Texas House Bill 3979 =

Law on education in Texas, United States

Texas House Bill 3979 (HB 3979) is an act that relates to civics instruction and instruction policies in public schools in the state of Texas. A follow-up bill to HB 3979—TX Senate Bill 3—authored by Senator Bryan Hughes (R-Mineola) and others, which was filed on July 9, 2021, passed on July 16, 2021, and became law in December, limits the manner and extent to which students may learn about issues of race, racism, sex, sexism, and their relationship with American culture and history. It is commonly called Texas's "critical race theory law," after the academic field which became a popular target of criticism by conservative pundits.

== Bill content ==
Texas House Bill 3979 changes public school curriculum in Texas by prohibiting teachers from including controversial topics from the United States’ past like racism and the subjugation of people of color. The bill has three sections; section 1 amends subsections (h-1), (h-2), and (h-3) to Section 28.002 of the Texas Education Code (TEC).

The bill introduces founding documents like the Declaration of Independence, the Constitution of the United States, The Federalist Papers, and Alexis de Tocqueville's Democracy in America into public school curriculum. However, the bill also discourages teachers and administrators from discussing “controversial issues of public policy or social affairs.”

Secondly, HB 3979 states that if teachers do choose to discuss hot-button topics, they must be entirely impartial in doing so. The ordinance waives the requirement for teachers to undergo any training pertaining to dealing with racism and sex stereotyping in the classroom.

Most notably, this bill declares that teachers should avoid teaching the following concepts: (1) one race or sex is inherently superior to the other; (2) an individual is inherently racist, sexist or oppressive because of their own race or sex; (3) an individual should be treated unfairly because their race or sex; (4) members of certain groups should not disrespect individuals on the basis of race, sex, or religion; (5) an individual’s morality is based on their race or sex; (6) an individual bears responsibility for actions committed in the past by people of the same race or sex; (7) an individual should be ashamed or guilty because of their race or sex; (8) meritocracy is racist or sexist.

== Legislative history ==
HB 3979 was passed on June 15, 2021 during the regular session of the Eighty-seventh Texas Legislature by a record vote of 36-0. The bill passed the Texas House with a 79-65 vote. The bill became effective on September 1, 2021.

A follow-up bill to HB 3079—TX Senate Bill 3—amended the Education code, in regards to "certain curriculum in public schools, including certain instructional requirements and prohibitions." It was passed on passed on July 16, 2021. It was co-authored by Senator Bryan Hughes (R-Mineola). It becomes law in December. This act essentially bans teaching CRT in Texas schools.

== Reactions ==
The American Historical Association voiced their disapproval of both HB 3979 and its companion bill—Senate Bill 2202, in a May 19, 2021 letter to Texas Lt. Governor Dan Patrick and members of the Texas Senate. The AHA's letter raised concerns that both HB 3979 and its companion bill—Senate Bill 2202—prohibit "difficult, controversial questions" that are "standard content required in Advanced Placement and dual-enrollment American history courses offered at the high school level." In dual-enrollment programs, high school teachers must teach both college and high school level material. This could lead to Texas high school courses losing Advanced Placement accreditation. As well, the performance of Texas AP students, and those in the dual-enrollment program—which gives high school students college credit for qualified work—could be compromised. These two programs—AP and dual-enrollment—could become defunct.

Outside of groups and organizations, the public is also vehemently against HB 3979 because it is white-washing American history by removing content having to do with slavery, the mistreatment of Native Americans, inequalities based on race, gender, and religion. There have been many protests in response to the bill passing.

School districts and teachers have found HB 3979 difficult to comprehend. In October 2021, the Carroll Independent School District school board made recommendations on elementary school curricula, based on their interpretation of the Texas critical race theory, which would require books about the Holocaust to be balanced with ones "that [have] other perspectives." The district's superintendent, experts on education policy, and state senator Bryan Hughes deny that the bill will affect the presentation of factual material.

The law, and confusion over how to enforce it, led to many book challenges. In October 2021, Texas Representative Matt Krause distributed a list to Texas school superintendents containing 850 books having to do with race, sexuality, and history which might "make students feel discomfort". In November 2021, Governor Greg Abbott publicized his investigation into pornography and obscenity accessible to kids in school libraries. Following the investigations by Krause and Abbott, a San Antonio district removed more than 400 books in December 2021.
