= 2023 Detroit Tigers season =

Major League Baseball season

2023 Detroit Tigers
- League: American League
- Division: Central
- Ballpark: Comerica Park
- City: Detroit, Michigan
- Record: 78–84 (.481)
- Divisional place: 2nd
- Owners: Christopher Ilitch; Ilitch family trust
- President of baseball operations: Scott Harris
- Managers: A. J. Hinch
- Television: Bally Sports Detroit (Matt Shepard, Kirk Gibson, Craig Monroe, Dan Petry, Cameron Maybin, Todd Jones)
- Radio: Detroit Tigers Radio Network (English) (Dan Dickerson, Jim Price (until July, now deceased), Andy Dirks, Bobby Scales, Cameron Maybin); WXYT (Carlos Guillén, Bárbaro Garbey and Mari Montes) (Spanish, 22 games)
- Stats: ESPN.com; Baseball Reference

The 2023 Detroit Tigers season was the team's 123rd season and its 24th at Comerica Park. This was the Tigers' third season under manager A. J. Hinch. The regular season began on March 30 and ended on October 1. This was the final season for long-time Tigers slugger Miguel Cabrera, who announced he would retire from playing. The Tigers finished with a 78–84 record, second place in the AL Central behind the Minnesota Twins, and failed to make the playoffs for the ninth consecutive season.

The Detroit Tigers drew an average home attendance of 20,946 in 77 home games in the 2023 MLB season, the 25th highest in the league. The total attendance was 1,612,876.

== Announcer changes ==
The Tigers added several new announcers this season on both television and radio. Cameron Maybin and Todd Jones were added as TV analysts for select games. Maybin was also heard on select radio broadcasts, in addition to analyst Bobby Scales and Daniella Bruce as pre-game interviewer and host. Former Tigers outfielder Andy Dirks has also filled in as analyst for some games on Tigers Radio, as he did in 2022. Carlos Guillén, Bárbaro Garbey and Mari Montes called 22 games in Spanish on WXYT 1270 AM.

This was the final season for TV play-by-play announcer Matt Shepard, who had been in that role full time since September 2018 and had previously served as backup to Mario Impemba.

The Tigers also lost a longtime announcer this season on August 7, when former Tigers catcher and color commentator Jim Price died at the age of 81. Price was a member of the 1968 World Series Champion Tigers team and had been the Tigers radio analyst since 1998. He performed the same role on TV from 1993 to 1997.

== Roster moves ==
=== Coaching staff ===
- On October 7, 2022, the Tigers fired hitting coach Scott Coolbaugh and quality-control coach Josh Paul. Third-base coach Ramon Santiago and assistant hitting coach Mike Hessman were reassigned and offered minor-league coaching positions.
- On November 15, 2022, the Tigers hired Michael Brdar and Keith Beauregard as hitting coaches. They also hired James Rowson as assistant hitting coach and Robin Lund as assistant pitching coach.

=== Trades ===
- On December 7, 2022, the Tigers traded pitcher Joe Jiménez to the Atlanta Braves in exchange for third baseman Justyn-Henry Malloy and pitcher Jake Higginbotham.
- On December 31, 2022, the Tigers acquired infielder Tyler Nevin from the Baltimore Orioles in exchange for cash considerations.
- On January 3, 2023, the Tigers traded outfielder Bligh Madris to the Houston Astros in exchange for cash considerations after previously claiming him off waivers and then designating him for assignment.
- On January 7, 2023, the Tigers traded pitcher Gregory Soto and infielder Kody Clemens to the Philadelphia Phillies in exchange for outfielder Matt Vierling, infielder Nick Maton and catcher Donny Sands.
- On March 27, 2023, the Tigers traded minor league pitcher Carlos Guzman to the Chicago Cubs in exchange for utility infielder Zach McKinstry.
- On May 30, 2023, the Tigers acquired minor league outfielder Jake Marisnick from the Chicago White Sox in exchange for cash considerations. His contract was selected by the Tigers the next day and he was added to the major league roster.
- On June 8, 2023, the Tigers acquired minor league infielder Joe Rizzo from the Miami Marlins in exchange for cash considerations.
- On June 18, 2023, the Tigers acquired pitcher Blair Calvo from the Colorado Rockies in exchange for cash considerations. He was then optioned to AAA Toledo.
- On August 1, 2023, the Tigers traded pitcher Michael Lorenzen to the Philadelphia Phillies for infield prospect Hao-Yu Lee.
- On August 1, 2023, the Tigers acquired minor league shortstop Eddys Leonard from the Los Angeles Dodgers for cash considerations. He was then optioned to AAA Toledo.

=== Releases ===
- On October 10, 2022, pitcher Drew Carlton elected free agency. On December 10, he signed a minor league contract with the San Diego Padres.
- On October 13, 2022, pitcher Drew Hutchison elected free agency after being designated for assignment and clearing waivers. On January 6, 2023, Hutchison signed a minor-league contract with the Toronto Blue Jays.
- On October 18, 2022, minor-league catcher Ali Sanchez was claimed off waivers by the Pittsburgh Pirates after being designated for assignment.
- On November 6, 2022, relief pitcher Andrew Chafin opted out of the second year of his two-year contract with Detroit, making him a free agent. On the same day, relief pitcher Daniel Norris and catcher Tucker Barnhart also elected free agency. On December 29, Barnhart signed a two-year contract with the Chicago Cubs. On February 15, Chafin signed a one-year deal with the Arizona Diamondbacks and Norris signed a minor league contract with the Cincinnati Reds.
- On November 9, 2022, outfielder Daz Cameron was claimed off waivers by the Baltimore Orioles. Third-baseman Josh Lester cleared waivers and was outrighted to the Toledo Mud Hens but chose to elect free agency. On December 6, Lester signed a minor-league contract with the Orioles.
- On November 10, 2022, the Tigers outrighted shortstops Luis García and Jermaine Palacios, outfielder Víctor Reyes and pitchers Bryan Garcia, Elvin Rodríguez and Luis Castillo to their triple-A affiliate, the Toledo Mud Hens. Aside from Luis Garcia, all of the players elected free agency after rejecting the outright assignment. On December 12, Reyes signed a minor-league contract with the Chicago White Sox. On December 16, 2022, Castillo signed with the Chiba Lotte Marines of Nippon Professional Baseball. On January 19, 2023, Rodriguez signed a minor league contract with the Tampa Bay Rays. On February 7, 2023, Bryan Garcia signed a minor league contract with the Houston Astros. Luis Garcia was released on July 20, 2023.
- On November 15, 2022, the Tigers outrighted pitcher Sean Guenther to Toledo after being designated for assignment. The Tigers also designated pitchers Miguel Diaz and Kyle Funkhouser for assignment along with infielder Brendon Davis and catcher Michael Papierski. On January 17, 2023, Funkhouser signed a minor league deal with the Texas Rangers.
- On November 18, 2022, the Tigers did not tender contracts to infielders Jeimer Candelario, Willi Castro and Harold Castro, all of whom became free agents. They also non-tendered designated players Diaz, Funkhouser, Davis and Papierski. On November 29. Candelario signed a one-year contract with the Washington Nationals. On December 30, Willi Castro signed a minor-league deal with the Minnesota Twins. On January 19, 2023, Harold Castro signed a minor league contract with the Colorado Rockies.
- On December 23, 2022, the Tigers designated Ángel De Jesús for assignment. He was outrighted to the Toledo Mud Hens after clearing waivers on January 6, 2023.
- On June 23, 2023, the Tigers released minor league infielder Brendon Davis.
- On July 8, 2023, the Tigers designated infielder Jonathan Schoop for assignment. On July 14, Schoop was released by the Tigers.
- On July 9, 2023, the Tigers designated outfielder Jake Marisnick for assignment. Marisnick refused his outright assignment and became a free agent on July 13. He signed with the Los Angeles Dodgers the next day.
- On August 11, 2023, the Tigers designated pitcher Chasen Shreve for assignment and he quickly cleared waivers and became a free agent. He signed a minor-league contract with the Cincinnati Reds on August 18.
- On August 19, 2023, the Tigers designated catcher Eric Haase for assignment. Haase was claimed off waivers by the Cleveland Guardians on August 22.

=== Signings ===
- On November 2, 2022, the Tigers claimed relief pitcher Sean Guenther off waivers from the Miami Marlins. He sat out the entire 2022 season after having Tommy John surgery. He was outrighted to the Toledo Mud Hens after clearing waivers on November 15, 2022.
- On November 10, 2022, the Tigers claimed infielder Andy Ibanez off waivers from the Texas Rangers. He was outrighted to the Toledo Mud Hens after clearing waivers on January 6, 2023. The Tigers purchased his contract and added him to the active roster on April 29, 2023.
- On November 18, 2022, the Tigers claimed outfielder Bligh Madris off waivers from the Tampa Bay Rays. Madris was designated for assignment on December 21 and ultimately traded away on January 3, 2023.
- On November 18, 2022, the Tigers and pitcher Tyler Alexander agreed on a one-year, $1.875 million contract, avoiding arbitration.
- On November 21, 2022, the Tigers re-signed recently non-tendered players Davis, Papierski, Diaz and Palacios to minor-league contracts. Palacios was released by the Tigers on June 8, 2023. Davis was released on June 23, 2023. The Tigers selected Diaz's contract on September 1, 2023, and added him to the roster.
- On November 25, 2022, the Tigers and outfielder Austin Meadows agreed on a one-year, $4.3 million contract, avoiding arbitration.
- On December 14, 2022, the Tigers signed pitcher Matthew Boyd to a one-year, $10 million contract.
- On December 14, 2022, the Tigers signed pitcher Michael Lorenzen to a one-year, $8.5 million contract.
- On December 21, 2022, the Tigers claimed catcher Mario Feliciano off waivers from the Milwaukee Brewers. He was outrighted to the Toledo Mud Hens after clearing waivers on January 6, 2023.
- On December 23, 2022, the Tigers claimed pitcher Zach Logue off waivers from the Oakland Athletics. Logue was designated for assignment on December 31. He was outrighted to the Toledo Mud Hens after clearing waivers on January 6, 2023. After having his contract purchased in late June, Logue made three appearances for the Tigers before being designated for assignment again on August 7.
- On January 9, 2023, the Tigers sign pitcher Chasen Shreve to a minor-league contract. He made the team out of spring training.
- On January 11, 2023, the Tigers claimed pitcher Edwin Uceta off waivers from the Arizona Diamondbacks. On April 2, 2023, Uceta was claimed off waivers by the Pittsburgh Pirates.
- On January 13, 2023, the Tigers agreed to a one-year, $2.2875 million contract with pitcher José Cisnero, avoiding arbitration.
- On January 15, 2023, the Tigers signed pitcher Trey Wingenter to a minor-league contract with an invitation to spring training. He made the team out of spring training.
- On January 30, 2023, the Tigers signed outfielder Jonathan Davis to a minor-league contract with an invitation to spring training. On May 22, 2023, Davis was traded to the Miami Marlins for minor-league outfielder Brady Allen.
- On February 15, 2023, the Tigers signed pitcher Jace Fry to a minor-league contract. The Tigers released Fry on June 8.
- On February 17, 2023, the Tigers claimed pitcher Tyler Holton off waivers from the Arizona Diamondbacks. After starting the season being optioned to AAA Toledo, Holton was called up on April 15.
- On March 14, 2023, the Tigers claimed pitcher Freddy Pacheco off waivers from the St. Louis Cardinals. He was optioned to AAA Toledo, and invited to major league spring training. After being placed on the 60-day injured list to start the season, Pacheco had season ending Tommy John surgery on June 5.
- On May 1, 2023, the Tigers claimed pitcher Braden Bristo off waivers from the Tampa Bay Rays. He was optioned to AAA Toledo. After pitching in two games for the Tigers, Bristo was designated for assignment on June 18. After clearing waivers, Bristo was outrighted to AAA Toledo.
- On May 16, 2023, the Tigers claimed pitcher Seth Elledge off waivers from the New York Mets. He was optioned to AAA Toledo. He was designated for assignment on June 18. After clearing waivers, Elledge elected free agency and signed a minor league contract with the Atlanta Braves.
- On June 9, 2023, the Tigers claimed infielder Nick Solak off waivers from the Atlanta Braves. He was optioned to AAA Toledo. Solak was called up the next day.
- On June 18, 2023, the Tigers claimed pitcher Anthony Misiewicz off waivers from the Arizona Diamondbacks. He was optioned to AAA Toledo. Misiewicz was called up on June 28. He only pitched in one game for the Tigers before being designated for assignment. The New York Yankees claimed Misiewicz off waivers on July 6.
- On June 23, 2023, the Tigers signed minor league infielder Johan Camargo and assigned him to AAA Toledo. The Tigers released Camargo on August 3.
- On August 4, 2023, the Tigers claimed pitcher Andrew Vasquez off waivers from the Philadelphia Phillies.
- On August 7, 2023, the Tigers claimed infielder Isan Díaz off waivers from the San Francisco Giants. He was optioned to AAA Toledo. Diaz cleared waivers and was outrighted to AAA Toledo on August 28 after being called up and playing in two games for the Tigers. Diaz refused his assignment to Toledo and elected free agency.
- On August 19, 2023, the Tigers signed catcher Carson Kelly to a major league contract.
- On August 29, 2023, the Tigers claimed pitcher Bennett Sousa off waivers from the Milwaukee Brewers. He was optioned to AAA Toledo. He was designated for assignment on September 1. On September 3, Sousa was claimed off waivers by the Houston Astros.

== Season standings ==
=== American League Central ===
AL Central
Team	W	L	Pct.	GB	Home	Road
Minnesota Twins	87	75	.537	—	47‍–‍34	40‍–‍41
Detroit Tigers	78	84	.481	9	37‍–‍44	41‍–‍40
Cleveland Guardians	76	86	.469	11	42‍–‍39	34‍–‍47
Chicago White Sox	61	101	.377	26	31‍–‍50	30‍–‍51
Kansas City Royals	56	106	.346	31	33‍–‍48	23‍–‍58

=== American League Wild Card ===
Division leaders
Team	W	L	Pct.
Baltimore Orioles	101	61	.623
Houston Astros	90	72	.556
Minnesota Twins	87	75	.537

Wild Card teams (Top 3 teams qualify for postseason)
Team	W	L	Pct.	GB
Tampa Bay Rays	99	63	.611	+10
Texas Rangers	90	72	.556	+1
Toronto Blue Jays	89	73	.549	—
Seattle Mariners	88	74	.543	1
New York Yankees	82	80	.506	7
Boston Red Sox	78	84	.481	11
Detroit Tigers	78	84	.481	11
Cleveland Guardians	76	86	.469	13
Los Angeles Angels	73	89	.451	16
Chicago White Sox	61	101	.377	28
Kansas City Royals	56	106	.346	33
Oakland Athletics	50	112	.309	39

=== Record vs. opponents ===
==== Record vs. American League ====
2023 American League record Source: MLB Standings Grid – 2023
Team	BAL	BOS	CWS	CLE	DET	HOU	KC	LAA	MIN	NYY	OAK	SEA	TB	TEX	TOR	NL
Baltimore	—	7–6	4–2	3–4	6–1	3–3	5–1	5–2	4–2	7–6	6–1	4–2	8–5	3–3	10–3	26–20
Boston	6–7	—	2–4	3–3	5–1	2–5	5–2	3–4	4–3	9–4	4–2	3–3	2–11	3–3	7–6	20–26
Chicago	2–4	4–2	—	8–5	5–8	3–4	6–7	3–4	4–9	4–2	3–4	2–4	1–6	1–5	0–6	15–31
Cleveland	4–3	3–3	5–8	—	4–9	2–4	7–6	3–4	7–6	2–4	5–1	4–3	3–3	3–3	4–3	20–26
Detroit	1–6	1–5	8–5	9–4	—	3–3	10–3	3–3	8–5	2–5	3–4	3–3	1–5	3–4	2–4	21–25
Houston	3–3	5–2	4–3	4–2	3–3	—	1–5	9–4	2–4	2–5	10–3	4–9	3–3	9–4	3–4	28–18
Kansas City	1–5	2–5	7–6	6–7	3–10	5–1	—	2–4	4–9	2–4	2–4	1–6	3–4	1–5	1–6	16–30
Los Angeles	2–5	4–3	4–3	4–3	3–3	4–9	4–2	—	3–3	4–2	7–6	5–8	2–4	6–7	2–4	19–27
Minnesota	2–4	3–4	9–4	6–7	5–8	4–2	9–4	3–3	—	4–3	5–1	3–4	1–5	5–2	3–3	25–21
New York	6–7	4–9	2–4	4–2	5–2	5–2	4–2	2–4	3–4	—	5–1	4–2	5–8	3–4	7–6	23–23
Oakland	1–6	2–4	4–3	1–5	4–3	3–10	4–2	6–7	1–5	1–5	—	1–12	2–5	4–9	2–4	14–32
Seattle	2–4	3–3	4–2	3–4	3–3	9–4	6–1	8–5	4–3	2–4	12–1	—	3–4	4–9	3–3	22–24
Tampa Bay	5–8	11–2	6–1	3–3	5–1	3–3	4–3	4–2	5–1	8–5	5–2	4–3	—	2–4	7–6	27–19
Texas	3–3	3–3	5–1	3–3	4–3	4–9	5–1	7–6	2–5	4–3	9–4	9–4	4–2	—	6–1	22–24
Toronto	3–10	6–7	6–0	3–4	4–2	4–3	6–1	4–2	3–3	6–7	4–2	3–3	6–7	1–6	—	30–16

Updated with the results of all games through October 1, 2023.

==== Record vs. National League ====
2023 American League record vs. National League Source: MLB Standings
Team	ARI	ATL	CHC	CIN	COL	LAD	MIA	MIL	NYM	PHI	PIT	SD	SF	STL	WSH
Baltimore	2–1	1–2	1–2	1–2	2–1	1–2	3–0	1–2	3–0	1–2	2–1	1–2	2–1	1–2	4–0
Boston	2–1	3–1	2–1	1–2	1–2	1–2	0–3	2–1	2–1	2–1	0–3	2–1	1–2	0–3	1–2
Chicago	1–2	2–1	1–3	2–1	1–2	1–2	1–2	0–3	1–2	1–2	1–2	0–3	1–2	1–2	1–2
Cleveland	1–2	1–2	2–1	2–2	1–2	1–2	1–2	1–2	0–3	2–1	2–1	1–2	1–2	2–1	2–1
Detroit	0–3	1–2	1–2	1–2	2–1	1–2	1–2	2–1	3–0	0–3	2–2	1–2	3–0	2–1	1–2
Houston	3–0	3–0	3–0	0–3	3–1	1–2	2–1	1–2	2–1	1–2	2–1	2–1	1–2	2–1	2–1
Kansas City	1–2	0–3	1–2	0–3	1–2	2–1	0–3	0–3	3–0	1–2	0–3	2–1	2–1	2–2	1–2
Los Angeles	1–2	1–2	3–0	0–3	1–2	0–4	0–3	1–2	2–1	1–2	2–1	0–3	2–1	3–0	2–1
Minnesota	3–0	0–3	2–1	2–1	2–1	1–2	1–2	2–2	2–1	2–1	2–1	2–1	1–2	2–1	1–2
New York	2–1	0–3	1–2	3–0	1–2	2–1	1–2	1–2	2–2	2–1	2–1	2–1	2–1	1–2	1–2
Oakland	1–2	2–1	0–3	1–2	2–1	0–3	0–3	3–0	0–3	0–3	2–1	0–3	2–2	1–2	0–3
Seattle	2–1	1–2	1–2	1–2	3–0	0–3	2–1	0–3	1–2	1–2	2–1	3–1	2–1	2–1	1–2
Tampa Bay	2–1	1–2	1–2	2–1	3–0	2–1	3–1	2–1	1–2	0–3	3–0	1–2	2–1	1–2	3–0
Texas	1–3	1–2	1–2	0–3	3–0	1–2	3–0	0–3	2–1	3–0	2–1	0–3	2–1	2–1	1–2
Toronto	3–0	3–0	1–2	2–1	2–1	2–1	2–1	2–1	3–0	1–3	3–0	1–2	2–1	1–2	2–1

Updated with the results of all games through October 1, 2023.

== Season highlights ==
=== Individual accomplishments ===
==== Pitching ====
On April 23 against the Baltimore Orioles, Eduardo Rodríguez took a perfect game into the seventh inning before it was spoiled by a single into left field by Ryan Mountcastle.

On June 2 against the Chicago White Sox, Reese Olson in his MLB debut took a no-hitter into the sixth inning before it was spoiled by a left-field single by Romy Gonzalez.

On September 8 also against the White Sox, Olson took a no-hitter in the seventh inning before it was broken up by a double by Luis Robert Jr.

==== Hitting ====
On June 14 against the Atlanta Braves, Miguel Cabrera hit his first home run of the season, he became the fifth player in Tigers history to hit a home run at the age of 40, joining Norm Cash, Doc Cramer, Darrell Evans, and Bobby Lowe.

=== Team accomplishments ===
==== Hitting ====
On July 2, the Tigers hit two grand slams against the Colorado Rockies, the first time since May 2009 the team has achieved this feat. The Tigers hit five total home runs in their 14–9 victory.

==== Pitching ====
On July 8 against the Toronto Blue Jays, three Tigers pitchers (Matt Manning, Jason Foley, and Alex Lange) completed a combined no-hitter, the ninth no-hitter and the first combined no-hitter in franchise history.

== Game log ==
2023 Game Log: 78–84 (Home: 37–44; Road 41–40)
March/April: 10–17 (Home: 5–7; Road: 5–10)

#	Date	Opponent	Score	Win	Loss	Save	Attendance	Record	Streak
1	March 30	@ Rays	0–4	McClanahan (1–0)	**Rodríguez** (0–1)	—	25,025	0–1	L1
2	April 1	@ Rays	2–12	Eflin (1–0)	**Turnbull** (0–1)	—	20,204	0–2	L2
3	April 2	@ Rays	1–5	Springs (1–0)	**Wentz** (0–1)	—	19,425	0–3	L3
4	April 3	@ Astros	7–6 (11)	**Wingenter** (1–0)	Neris (0–1)	**Hill** (1)	29,272	1–3	W1
5	April 4	@ Astros	6–3	**Manning** (1–0)	Valdez (0–1)	—	30,613	2–3	W2
6	April 5	@ Astros	2–8	Javier (1–0)	**Rodríguez** (0–2)	—	37,932	2–4	L1
7	April 6	Red Sox	3–6	Sale (1–0)	**Turnbull** (0–2)	Jansen (1)	44,650	2–5	L2
8	April 8	Red Sox	5–14	Houck (2–0)	**Wentz** (0–2)	—	21,835	2–6	L3
9	April 9	Red Sox	1–4	Crawford (1–1)	**Boyd** (0–1)	Jansen (2)	14,885	2–7	L4
10	April 11	@ Blue Jays	3–9	Pop (1–0)	**Manning** (1–1)	—	42,053	2–8	L5
11	April 12	@ Blue Jays	3–4 (10)	Romano (2–0)	**Shreve** (0–1)	—	35,300	2–9	L6
12	April 13	@ Blue Jays	3–1	**Turnbull** (1–2)	Bassitt (1–2)	**Lange** (1)	26,192	3–9	W1
13	April 14	Giants	7–5 (11)	**Cisnero** (1–0)	Doval (0–2)	—	15,289	4–9	W2
14	April 15	Giants	7–6 (11)	**Shreve** (1–1)	Rogers (0–2)	—	18,344	5–9	W3
—	April 16	Giants	Postponed (inclement weather). Rescheduled to July 24.						
—	April 17	Guardians	Postponed (inclement weather). Rescheduled to April 18.						
15	April 18	Guardians	4–3	**Lange** (1–0)	Karinchak (0–3)	—	10,099	6–9	W4
16	April 18	Guardians	1–0	**Rodríguez** (1–2)	Battenfield (0–1)	**Foley** (1)	10,099	7–9	W5
17	April 19	Guardians	2–3	Quantrill (1–1)	**Turnbull** (1–3)	Clase (6)	11,230	7–10	L1
18	April 21	@ Orioles	1–2	Bautista (2–1)	**Foley** (0–1)	—	18,772	7–11	L2
19	April 22	@ Orioles	1–5	Gibson (4–0)	**Wentz** (0–3)	—	12,194	7–12	L3
20	April 23	@ Orioles	1–2 (10)	Akin (1–1)	**Englert** (0–1)	—	36,975	7–13	L4
21	April 24	@ Brewers	4–2	**Boyd** (1–1)	Rea (0–1)	**Lange** (2)	23,201	8–13	W1
22	April 25	@ Brewers	4–3	**Turnbull** (2–3)	Lauer (3–2)	**Foley** (2)	24,924	9–13	W2
23	April 26	@ Brewers	2–6	Peralta (3–2)	**Lorenzen** (0–1)	—	25,847	9–14	L1
24	April 27	Orioles	4–7	Baker (2–0)	**Shreve** (1–2)	Bautista (6)	11,599	9–15	L2
–	April 28	Orioles	Postponed (inclement weather). Rescheduled to April 29.						
25	April 29	Orioles	7–4	**Rodríguez** (2–2)	Kremer (2–1)	**Lange** (3)	17,974	10–15	W1
26	April 29	Orioles	4–6	Rodriguez (1–0)	**Boyd** (1–2)	Bautista (7)	11,048	10–16	L1
27	April 30	Orioles	3–5	Voth (1–1)	**Turnbull** (1–4)	Canó (2)	13,626	10–17	L2

May: 16–11 (Home 9–6, Road 7–5)

#	Date	Opponent	Score	Win	Loss	Save	Attendance	Record	Streak
—	May 2	Mets	Postponed (inclement weather). Rescheduled to May 3.						
28	May 3	Mets	6–5	**Alexander** (1–0)	Ottavino (0–2)	**Lange** (4)	11,363	11–17	W1
29	May 3	Mets	8–1	**Lorenzen** (1–1)	Scherzer (2–2)	—	16,734	12–17	W2
30	May 4	Mets	2–0	**Rodríguez** (3–2)	Verlander (0–1)	**Lange** (5)	18,369	13–17	W3
31	May 5	@ Cardinals	5–4	**Boyd** (2–2)	Hicks (0–3)	**Lange** (6)	36,359	14–17	W4
32	May 6	@ Cardinals	6–5 (10)	**Cisnero** (2–0)	Gallegos (1–2)	—	39,512	15–17	W5
33	May 7	@ Cardinals	6–12	VerHagen (2–0)	**Englert** (1–2)	—	44,465	15–18	L1
34	May 8	@ Guardians	6–2	**Wentz** (1–3)	Bibee (1–1)	—	12,509	16–18	W1
35	May 9	@ Guardians	0–2	Bieber (3–1)	**Lorenzen** (1–2)	Clase (13)	13,096	16–19	L1
36	May 10	@ Guardians	5–0	**Rodríguez** (4–2)	Battenfield (0–4)	—	16,128	17–19	W1
37	May 12	Mariners	2–9	Gonzales (3–0)	**Boyd** (2–3)	—	22,116	17–20	L1
38	May 13	Mariners	0–5	Miller (2–0)	**Faedo** (0–1)	—	23,511	17–21	L2
39	May 14	Mariners	5–3	**Foley** (1–1)	Speier (1–1)	**Lange** (7)	20,160	18–21	W1
40	May 16	Pirates	4–0	**Lorenzen** (2–2)	Ortiz (0–2)	—	16,484	19–21	W2
41	May 17	Pirates	0–8	Hill (4–3)	**Rodríguez** (4–3)	—	14,542	19–22	L1
42	May 19	@ Nationals	8–6	**Boyd** (3–3)	Irvin (1–2)	**Lange** (8)	19,985	20–22	W1
43	May 20	@ Nationals	2–5	Corbin (3–5)	**Faedo** (0–2)	Finnegan (9)	31,721	20–23	L1
44	May 21	@ Nationals	4–6	Gray (4–5)	**Wentz** (1–4)	Harvey (2)	20,580	20–24	L2
45	May 22	@ Royals	8–5 (10)	**Lange** (2–0)	Barlow (1–3)	**Cisnero** (1)	14,229	21–24	W1
46	May 23	@ Royals	1–4	Cuas (3–0)	**Rodríguez** (4–4)	Chapman (2)	13,443	21–25	L1
47	May 24	@ Royals	6–4	**Vest** (1–0)	Taylor (1–2)	**Lange** (9)	11,898	22–25	W1
48	May 25	White Sox	7–2	**Faedo** (1–2)	Giolito (3–4)	—	15,003	23–25	W2
49	May 26	White Sox	3–12	Lynn (4–5)	**Wentz** (1–5)	—	21,701	23–26	L1
50	May 27	White Sox	7–3	**Foley** (2–1)	Kelly (1–2)	—	24,685	24–26	W1
51	May 28	White Sox	6–5 (10)	**Lange** (3–0)	López (0–4)	—	22,644	25–26	W2
52	May 29	Rangers	0–5	Eovaldi (7–2)	**Boyd** (3–4)	—	19,021	25–27	L1
53	May 30	Rangers	6–10	Anderson (1–0)	**Faedo** (1–3)	—	14,616	25–28	L2
54	May 31	Rangers	3–2	**Vest** (2–0)	Dunning (4–1)	**Lange** (10)	20,968	26–28	W1

June: 9–18 (Home 4–8, Road 5–10)

#	Date	Opponent	Score	Win	Loss	Save	Attendance	Record	Streak
55	June 2	@ White Sox	0–3	Middleton (1–0)	**Olson** (0–1)	Graveman (5)	20,229	26–29	L1
56	June 3	@ White Sox	1–2 (10)	López (1–4)	**Cisnero** (2–1)	—	24,674	26–30	L2
57	June 4	@ White Sox	2–6	Hendriks (1–0)	**Lange** (3–1)	—	23,372	26–31	L3
58	June 5	@ Phillies	3–8	Nola (5–4)	**Wentz** (1–6)	—	33,196	26–32	L4
59	June 6	@ Phillies	0–1	Walker (5–3)	**Alexander** (1–1)	Kimbrel (9)	36,664	26–33	L5
—	June 7	@ Phillies	Postponed (Air quality/Smoke). Rescheduled to June 8.						
60	June 8	@ Phillies	2–3	Kimbrel (4–1)	**Lange** (3–2)	—	29,028	26–34	L6
61	June 9	Diamondbacks	6–11	Kelly (8–3)	**Lorenzen** (2–3)	—	19,664	26–35	L7
62	June 10	Diamondbacks	0–5	Nelson (3–3)	**Boyd** (3–5)	—	31,607	26–36	L8
63	June 11	Diamondbacks	5–7	Ginkel (3–0)	**Foley** (2–2)	McGough (2)	17,956	26–37	L9
64	June 12	Braves	6–5 (10)	**Lange** (4–2)	Jiménez (0–2)	—	18,742	27–37	W1
–	June 13	Braves	Postponed (inclement weather). Rescheduled to June 14.						
65	June 14	Braves	7–10	Strider (7–2)	**Olson** (0–2)	—	24,186	27–38	L1
66	June 14	Braves	5–6	McHugh (3–0)	**Lorenzen** (2–4)	Minter (10)	24,186	27–39	L2
67	June 15	@ Twins	8–4	**Boyd** (4–5)	Morán (0–2)	—	27,570	28–39	W1
68	June 16	@ Twins	7–1	**Englert** (2–2)	Ryan (7–4)	—	27,170	29–39	W2
69	June 17	@ Twins	0–2	Headrick (1–0)	**Wentz** (1–7)	Durán (9)	26,950	29–40	L1
70	June 18	@ Twins	6–4	**White** (1–0)	Varland (3–3)	**Foley** (3)	31,221	30–40	W1
71	June 19	Royals	6–4	**Alexander** (2–1)	Clarke (1–1)	**Lange** (11)	18,438	31–40	W2
72	June 20	Royals	0–1	Lynch (1–3)	**Lorenzen** (2–5)	Barlow (8)	18,409	31–41	L1
73	June 21	Royals	9–4	**Boyd** (5–5)	Singer (4–7)	—	20,195	32–41	W1
74	June 23	Twins	1–4	Maeda (1–4)	**Wentz** (1–8)	Durán (10)	19,782	32–42	L1
75	June 24	Twins	3–2	**Olson** (1–2)	López (3–5)	**Lange** (12)	24,403	33–42	W1
76	June 25	Twins	3–6 (10)	Jax (4–6)	**White** (1–1)	Durán (11)	21,585	33–43	L1
77	June 26	@ Rangers	7–2	**Englert** (3–2)	Heaney (5–5)	—	22,320	34–43	W1
78	June 27	@ Rangers	3–8	Sborz (4–2)	**White** (1–2)	—	22,805	34–44	L1
79	June 28	@ Rangers	2–10	Dunning (7–1)	**Wentz** (1–9)	—	27,192	34–45	L2
80	June 29	@ Rangers	8–5	**Englert** (4–2)	Barlow (1–1)	—	26,977	35–45	W1
81	June 30	@ Rockies	5–8	Gomber (6–7)	**Lorenzen** (2–6)	Johnson (13)	47,239	35–46	L1

July: 12–13 (Home 4–9, Road 8–4)

#	Date	Opponent	Score	Win	Loss	Save	Attendance	Record	Streak
82	July 1	@ Rockies	4–2 (10)	**Lange** (5–2)	Johnson (1–4)	—	48,108	36–46	W1
83	July 2	@ Rockies	14–9	**Manning** (2–1)	Seabold (1–5)	—	40,145	37–46	W2
84	July 4	Athletics	0–1 (10)	Fujinami (5–7)	**Holton** (0–1)	May (6)	26,749	37–47	L1
85	July 5	Athletics	3–12	Waldichuk (2–5)	**Rodríguez** (4–5)	—	15,149	37–48	L2
86	July 6	Athletics	9–0	**Lorenzen** (3–6)	Harris (2–3)	—	15,133	38–48	W1
87	July 7	Blue Jays	2–12	Manoah (2–7)	**Faedo** (1–4)	—	30,029	38–49	L1
88	July 8	Blue Jays	2–0	**Manning** (3–1)	Gausman (7–5)	**Lange** (13)	30,621	39–49	W1
89	July 9	Blue Jays	3–4 (10)	García (3–3)	**Cisnero** (2–2)	Romano (26)	30,077	39–50	L1
**2023 Major League Baseball All-Star Game**
90	July 14	@ Mariners	5–4	**Rodríguez** (5–5)	Castillo (6–7)	**Lange** (14)	39,014	40–50	W1
91	July 15	@ Mariners	6–0	**Lorenzen** (4–6)	Kirby (8–8)	—	38,683	41–50	W2
92	July 16	@ Mariners	0–2	Miller (6–3)	**Olson** (1–2)	Sewald (18)	32,368	41–51	L1
93	July 17	@ Royals	3–2	**White** (2–2)	Clarke (1–4)	**Lange** (15)	19,440	42–51	W1
94	July 18	@ Royals	10–11	Lynch (3–4)	**Skubal** (0–1)	—	18,448	42–52	L1
95	July 19	@ Royals	3–2	**Rodríguez** (6–5)	Yarbrough (2–5)	**Lange** (16)	17,903	43–52	W1
96	July 20	@ Royals	3–0	**Lorenzen** (5–6)	Greinke (1–10)	**Foley** (4)	11,478	44–52	W2
97	July 21	Padres	4–5	Lugo (4–4)	**Olson** (1–4)	Hader (24)	28,834	44–53	L1
98	July 22	Padres	3–14	Wolf (1–0)	**Englert** (4–3)	—	31,974	44–54	L2
99	July 23	Padres	3–1	**Faedo** (2–4)	Musgrove (9–3)	**Lange** (17)	24,523	45–54	W1
100	July 24	Giants	5–1	**Skubal** (1–1)	Stripling (0–4)	—	16,907	46–54	W2
101	July 25	Angels	6–7 (10)	Estévez (4–1)	**Lange** (5–3)	Loup (1)	24,856	46–55	L1
—	July 26	Angels	Postponed (inclement weather). Rescheduled to July 27.						
102	July 27 (1)	Angels	0–6	Ohtani (9–5)	**Lorenzen** (5–7)	—	see 2nd game	46–56	L2
103	July 27 (2)	Angels	4–11	Sandoval (6–7)	**Manning** (3–2)	—	30,238	46–57	L3
104	July 28	@ Marlins	5–6	Chargois (2–0)	**Foley** (2–3)	Puk (16)	15,918	46–58	L4
105	July 29	@ Marlins	5–0	**Wentz** (2–9)	Cueto (0–2)	—	32,936	47–58	W1
106	July 30	@ Marlins	6–8	López (5–2)	**Holton** (0–2)	Robertson (15)	18,207	47–59	L1

August: 13–15 (Home 7–10, Road 6–5)

#	Date	Opponent	Score	Win	Loss	Save	Attendance	Record	Streak
107	August 1	@ Pirates	1–4	Oviedo (5–11)	**Manning** (3–3)	Bednar (22)	19,427	47–60	L2
108	August 2	@ Pirates	6–3	**Rodríguez** (7–5)	Bido (2–2)	**Holton** (1)	14,370	48–60	W1
109	August 4	Rays	0–8	Littell (2–2)	**Olson** (1–5)	—	26,050	48–61	L1
110	August 5	Rays	4–2	**Skubal** (2–1)	Civale (5–3)	**Brieske** (1)	30,939	49–61	W1
111	August 6	Rays	6–10	Poche (9–3)	**Manning** (3–4)	—	21,824	49–62	L1
112	August 7	Twins	3–9	López (7–6)	**Wentz** (2–10)	—	13,779	49–63	L2
113	August 8	Twins	6–0	**Rodríguez** (8–5)	Gray (5–5)	—	16,588	50–63	W1
114	August 9	Twins	9–5	**Holton** (1–2)	Ober (6–6)	**Cisnero** (2)	16,570	51–63	W2
115	August 10	Twins	3–0	**Olson** (2–5)	Maeda (3–7)	**Brieske** (2)	18,709	52–63	W3
116	August 11	@ Red Sox	2–5	Barraclough (1–0)	**Skubal** (2–2)	Murphy (1)	32,647	52–64	L1
117	August 12	@ Red Sox	6–2	**Manning** (4–4)	Bello (8–7)	**Foley** (5)	35,927	53–64	W1
118	August 13	@ Red Sox	3–6	Whitlock (5–3)	**Rodríguez** (8–6)	Jansen (27)	35,145	53–65	L1
119	August 15	@ Twins	3–5	Floro (4–5)	**Cisnero** (2–3)	Durán (22)	30,150	53–66	L2
120	August 16	@ Twins	8–7	**Holton** (2–2)	Jax (5–7)	—	26,716	54–66	W1
—	August 17	@ Guardians	Postponed (inclement weather). Rescheduled to August 18.						
121	August 18 (1)	@ Guardians	4–2	**Skubal** (3–2)	Williams (1–4)	**Foley** (6)	see 2nd game	55–66	W2
122	August 18 (2)	@ Guardians	1–4	De Los Santos (5–2)	**Cisnero** (2–4)	Clase (33)	31,556	55–67	L1
123	August 19	@ Guardians	4–3	**Manning** (5–4)	Bibee (9–3)	**Foley** (7)	32,641	56–67	W1
124	August 20	@ Guardians	4–1	**Rodríguez** (9–6)	Allen (6–6)	**Lange** (18)	26,824	57–67	W2
125	August 21	Cubs	6–7	Palencia (3–0)	**Brieske** (0–1)	Leiter Jr. (4)	20,560	57–68	L1
126	August 22	Cubs	8–6	**Holton** (3–2)	Smyly (9–9)	**Lange** (19)	21,211	58–68	W1
127	August 23	Cubs	4–6	Merryweather (5–1)	**Brieske** (0–2)	Alzolay (19)	21,965	58–69	L1
128	August 25	Astros	4–1	**Lange** (6–3)	Pressly (3–4)	—	23,832	59–69	W1
129	August 26	Astros	2–9	Brown (10–9)	**Rodríguez** (9–7)	—	27,103	59–70	L1
130	August 27	Astros	4–17	Verlander (10–6)	**Faedo** (2–5)	—	28,496	59–71	L2
131	August 28	Yankees	1–4	Severino (4–8)	**Olson** (2–6)	—	16,772	59–72	L3
132	August 29	Yankees	2–4	Brito (5–6)	**Skubal** (3–3)	—	17,236	59–73	L4
133	August 30	Yankees	2–6	Cole (12–4)	**White** (2–3)	Hamilton (2)	15,731	59–74	L5
134	August 31	Yankees	4–3 (10)	**Brieske** (1–2)	Loáisiga (0–1)	—	19,630	60–74	W1

September/October: 18–10 (Home 8–4, Road 10–6)

#	Date	Opponent	Score	Win	Loss	Save	Attendance	Record	Streak
135	September 1	@ White Sox	4–2	**Rodríguez** (10–7)	Toussaint (2–7)	**Lange** (20)	15,105	61–74	W2
136	September 2	@ White Sox	10–0	**Olson** (3–6)	Clevinger (6–7)	—	21,186	62–74	W3
137	September 3	@ White Sox	3–2	**Skubal** (4–3)	Bummer (4–4)	**Lange** (21)	22,246	63–74	W4
138	September 5	@ Yankees	1–5	Cole (13–4)	**Cisnero** (2–4)	—	31,553	63–75	L1
139	September 6	@ Yankees	3–4	Schmidt (9–8)	**Brieske** (1–3)	Holmes (18)	30,673	63–76	L2
140	September 7	@ Yankees	10–3	**Rodríguez** (11–7)	Rodón (2–5)	—	32,722	64–76	W1
141	September 8	White Sox	0–6	Clevinger (7–7)	**Olson** (3–7)	—	18,483	64–77	L1
142	September 9	White Sox	3–1	**Skubal** (5–3)	Ureña (0–5)	**Lange** (22)	20,159	65–77	W1
143	September 10	White Sox	3–2	**Gipson-Long** (1–0)	Scholtens (1–8)	**Lange** (23)	18,223	66–77	W2
144	September 12	Reds	5–6 (10)	Díaz (9–4)	**Lange** (6–4)	Farmer (3)	15,080	66–78	L1
145	September 13	Reds	3–4	Duarte (2–0)	**Rodríguez** (11–8)	Díaz (36)	15,507	66–79	L2
146	September 14	Reds	8–2	**Olson** (4–7)	Law (4–6)	—	16,945	67–79	W1
147	September 15	@ Angels	11–2	**Skubal** (6–3)	Canning (7–7)	—	37,822	68–79	W2
148	September 16	@ Angels	5–4 (10)	**Lange** (7–4)	Soriano (1–3)	**Vest** (1)	35,022	69–79	W3
149	September 17	@ Angels	5–3	**Wentz** (3–11)	Rosenberg (1–2)	**Lange** (24)	34,943	70–79	W4
150	September 18	@ Dodgers	3–8	Lynn (12–11)	**Rodríguez** (11–9)	—	37,239	70–80	L1
151	September 19	@ Dodgers	2–3	Vesia (2–5)	**Lange** (7–5)	—	42,223	70–81	L2
152	September 20	@ Dodgers	4–1	**Olson** (5–7)	Miller (10–4)	**Vest** (2)	42,635	71–81	W1
153	September 21	@ Athletics	7–3	**Skubal** (7–3)	Medina (3–10)	—	6,160	72–81	W2
154	September 23	@ Athletics	2–8	Waldichuk (4–8)	**Vest** (2–1)	—	8,751	72–82	L1
155	September 23	@ Athletics	1–4	Boyle (1–0)	**Wentz** (3–12)	May (20)	9,776	72–83	L2
156	September 24	@ Athletics	2–0	**Rodríguez** (12–9)	Sears (5–13)	**Lange** (25)	13,102	73–83	W1
157	September 26	Royals	6–3	**Foley** (3–3)	Clarke (3–6)	—	13,903	74–83	W2
—	September 27	Royals	Suspended (inclement weather). Rescheduled to September 28.						
158	September 28	Royals	8–0	**Diaz** (1–0)	Bowlan (0–1)	—	13,326	75–83	W3
159	September 28	Royals	7–3	**Cisnero** (3–4)	Ragans (7–5)	—	13,326	76–83	W4
160	September 29	Guardians	5–7	Quantrill (4–7)	**Wentz** (3–13)	Clase (44)	30,053	76–84	L1
161	September 30	Guardians	8–0	**Brieske** (2–3)	McKenzie (0–3)	—	40,224	77–84	W1
162	October 1	Guardians	5–2	**Rodríguez** (13–9)	Giolito (8–15)	**Lange** (26)	41,425	78–84	W2

Legend: = Win = Loss = Postponement
Bold = Tigers team member

== Roster ==
2023 Detroit Tigers
Roster
Pitchers: 70 Tyler Alexander; 4 Beau Brieske; 51 Braden Bristo; 48 Matthew Boyd; 67 José Cisnero; 58 Miguel Díaz; 53 Mason Englert; 49 Alex Faedo; 68 Jason Foley; 66 Sawyer Gipson-Long; 75 Brenan Hanifee; 50 Garrett Hill; 87 Tyler Holton; 55 Alex Lange; 71 Zach Logue; 21 Michael Lorenzen; 25 Matt Manning; 65 Anthony Misiewicz; 45 Reese Olson; 57 Eduardo Rodríguez; 36 Chasen Shreve; 29 Tarik Skubal; 56 Spencer Turnbull; 65 Andrew Vasquez; 19 Will Vest; 43 Joey Wentz; 52 Brendan White; 62 Trey Wingenter	Catchers: 13 Eric Haase; 15 Carson Kelly; 34 Jake Rogers; Infielders: 28 Javier Báez; 40 Isan Díaz; 77 Andy Ibáñez; 32 Ryan Kreidler; 27 Andre Lipcius; 9 Nick Maton; 39 Zach McKinstry; 18 Tyler Nevin; 8 Jonathan Schoop; 59 Zack Short; 46 Nick Solak; 20 Spencer Torkelson; Outfielders: 60 Akil Baddoo; 30 Kerry Carpenter; 31 Riley Greene; 75 Jake Marisnick; 17 Austin Meadows; 22 Parker Meadows; 8 Matt Vierling; Other batters: 24 Miguel Cabrera	Manager: 14 A. J. Hinch; Coaches: 99 Alfredo Amézaga (first base); 37 Keith Beauregard (hitting); 40 Michael Brdar (hitting); 98 Jeremy Carrell (bullpen catcher); 88 Tim Federowicz (catching coach); 41 Chris Fetter (pitching); 44 Gary Jones (third base); 26 George Lombard (bench); 63 Robin Lund (assistant pitching); 61 Juan Nieves (assistant pitching); 38 James Rowson (assistant hitting)

== Player statistics ==
= Indicates team leader

=== Batting ===
Note: G = Games played; AB = At bats; R = Runs; H = Hits; 2B = Doubles; 3B = Triples; HR = Home runs; RBI = Runs batted in; SB = Stolen bases; BB = Walks; AVG = Batting average; SLG = Slugging average

Player	G	AB	R	H	2B	3B	HR	RBI	SB	BB	AVG	SLG
Spencer Torkelson	159	606	88	141	34	1	31	94	3	67	.233	.446
Javier Báez	136	510	58	113	18	4	9	59	12	24	.222	.325
Matt Vierling	134	479	63	125	21	5	10	44	6	44	.261	.388
Zach McKinstry	148	464	60	107	21	4	9	35	16	44	.231	.351
Kerry Carpenter	118	418	57	116	17	2	20	64	6	32	.278	.471
Riley Greene	99	378	51	109	19	4	11	37	7	35	.288	.447
Andy Ibáñez	114	356	42	94	23	2	11	41	1	24	.264	.433
Miguel Cabrera	98	334	21	86	20	0	4	34	0	31	.257	.353
Jake Rogers	107	331	47	73	11	0	21	49	1	28	.221	.444
Akil Baddoo	112	312	40	68	13	1	11	34	14	42	.218	.372
Eric Haase	86	264	22	53	8	1	4	26	3	16	.201	.284
Nick Maton	93	249	29	43	9	0	8	32	1	38	.173	.305
Zack Short	110	221	17	45	9	0	7	33	5	28	.204	.339
Jonathan Schoop	55	136	15	29	8	0	0	7	0	13	.213	.272
Tyler Nevin	41	95	11	19	3	1	2	10	0	12	.200	.316
Jake Marisnick	33	69	9	16	3	2	2	10	2	3	.232	.420
Carson Kelly	18	52	7	9	2	0	1	7	0	7	.173	.269
Andre Lipcius	13	35	3	10	1	0	1	4	0	3	.286	.400
Austin Meadows	6	21	0	5	1	0	0	2	0	0	.238	.286
Ryan Kreidler	11	18	2	2	0	0	0	0	0	0	.111	.111
Isan Díaz	2	5	0	0	0	0	0	0	0	0	.000	.000
Nick Solak	1	0	0	0	0	0	0	0	0	0	.---	.---
Totals	162	5478	661	1292	245	29	165	635	85	508	.236	.382
Rank in AL	—	12	13	13	13	2	13	12	13	10	13	13

Source:Baseball Reference

=== Pitching ===
Note: W = Wins; L = Losses; ERA = Earned run average; G = Games pitched; GS = Games started; SV = Saves; IP = Innings pitched; H = Hits allowed; R = Runs allowed; ER = Earned runs allowed; BB = Walks allowed; SO = Strikeouts

Player	W	L	ERA	G	GS	SV	IP	H	R	ER	BB	SO
Eduardo Rodríguez	13	9	3.30	26	26	0	152.2	128	59	56	48	143
Joey Wentz	3	13	6.90	25	19	0	105.2	131	87	81	47	98
Michael Lorenzen	5	7	3.58	18	18	0	105.2	89	44	42	27	83
Reese Olson	5	7	3.99	21	18	0	103.2	83	49	46	33	103
Tyler Holton	3	2	2.11	59	1	1	85.1	56	21	20	18	74
Tarik Skubal	7	3	2.80	15	15	0	80.1	58	28	25	14	102
Matt Manning	5	4	3.58	15	15	0	78.0	60	37	31	21	50
Matthew Boyd	5	5	5.45	15	15	0	71.0	69	46	43	25	73
Jason Foley	3	3	2.61	70	0	7	69.0	65	21	20	15	55
Alex Lange	7	5	3.68	67	0	26	66.0	43	30	27	45	79
Alex Faedo	2	5	4.45	15	12	0	64.2	48	35	32	20	58
José Cisnero	3	4	5.31	63	0	2	59.1	63	39	35	25	70
Mason Englert	4	3	5.46	31	1	0	56.0	67	39	34	17	41
Will Vest	2	1	2.98	48	4	2	48.1	40	18	16	13	56
Tyler Alexander	2	1	4.50	25	1	0	44.0	44	25	22	5	44
Chasen Shreve	1	2	4.79	47	0	0	41.1	45	24	22	12	42
Brendan White	2	3	5.09	33	2	0	40.2	40	25	23	15	44
Beau Brieske	2	3	3.60	25	1	2	35.0	36	14	14	12	31
Spencer Turnbull	1	4	7.26	7	7	0	31.0	37	26	25	15	24
Sawyer Gipson-Long	1	0	2.70	4	4	0	20.0	14	7	6	8	26
Trey Wingenter	1	0	5.82	17	0	0	17.0	16	11	11	7	22
Garrett Hill	0	0	9.19	9	0	1	15.2	19	20	16	14	14
Miguel Díaz	1	0	0.64	12	3	0	14.0	8	1	1	5	16
Zach Logue	0	0	7.36	3	0	0	11.0	13	9	9	2	10
Andrew Vasquez	0	0	8.31	12	0	0	8.2	11	9	8	9	9
Zack Short	0	0	6.00	6	0	0	6.0	12	4	4	1	1
Brenan Hanifee	0	0	5.40	3	0	0	5.0	8	3	3	0	3
Braden Bristo	0	0	4.50	2	0	0	4.0	5	3	2	3	1
Jonathan Schoop	0	0	0.00	1	0	0	1.1	1	0	0	0	1
Zach McKinstry	0	0	18.00	1	0	0	1.0	3	2	2	0	0
Carson Kelly	0	0	13.50	1	0	0	0.2	4	1	1	0	1
Anthony Misiewicz	0	0	81.00	1	0	0	0.1	4	3	3	0	0
Totals	78	84	4.24	162	162	41	1442.1	1320	740	680	476	1374
Rank in AL	9	6	9	—	—	10	7	6	10	9	5	11

Note: No Tigers pitcher qualified for league ERA title because no pitchers recorded minimum 162 innings pitched.

Source:Baseball Reference

== Farm system ==
Level	Team	League	Manager
AAA	Toledo Mud Hens	International League	Anthony Iapoce
AA	Erie SeaWolves	Eastern League	Gabe Alvarez
High-A	West Michigan Whitecaps	Midwest League	Brayan Pena
Single-A	Lakeland Flying Tigers	Florida State League	
Rookie	Florida Complex League Tigers	Florida Complex League	
Rookie	DSL Tigers 1	Dominican Summer League	
Rookie	DSL Tigers 2	Dominican Summer League	
