= Trey Wingenter =

American baseball player (born 1994)

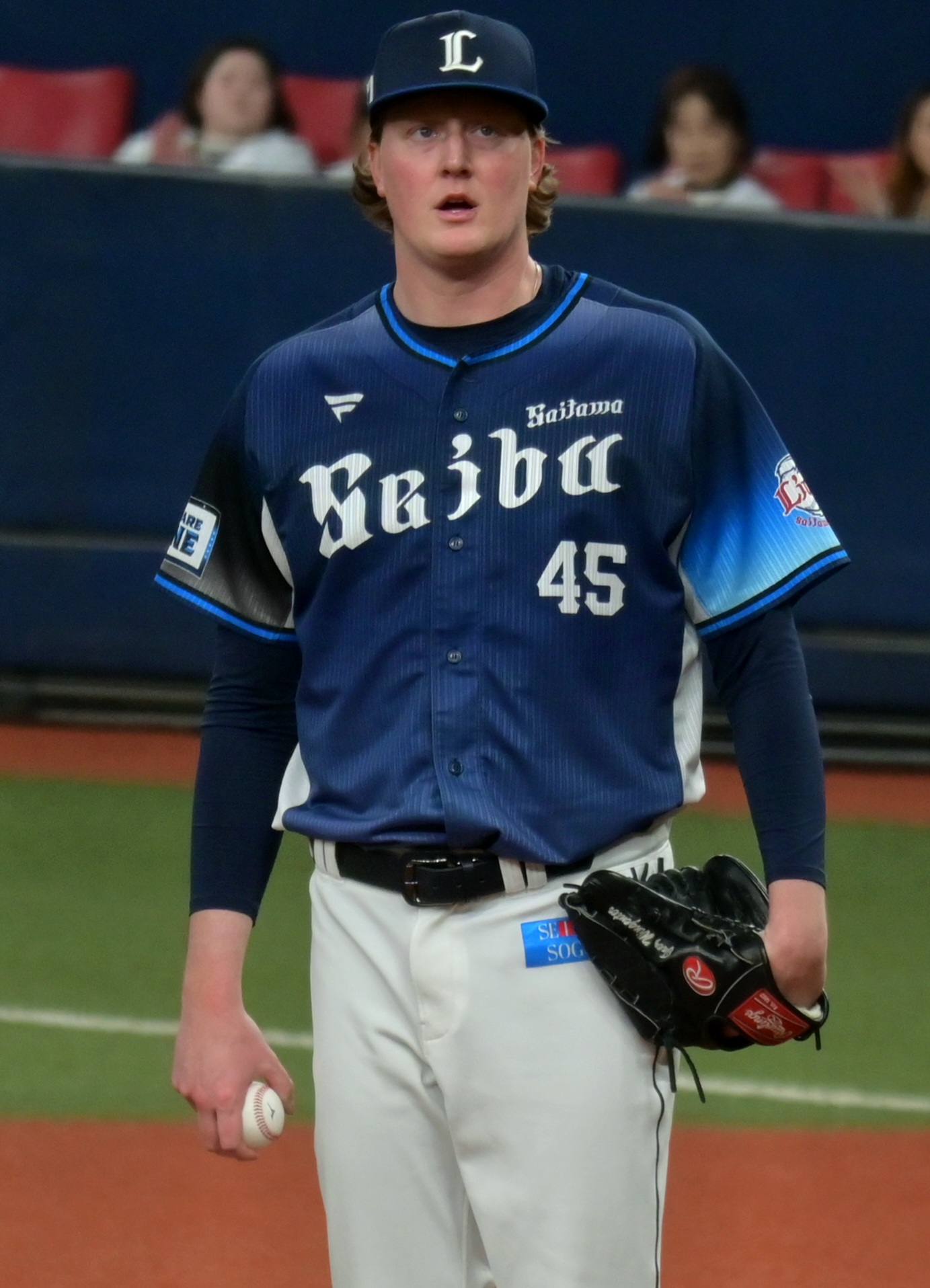
- Wingenter playing for the Saitama Seibu Lions in 2025

Saitama Seibu Lions – No. 45
- Pitcher
- Born: April 15, 1994 (age 32); Huntsville, Alabama, U.S.
- Bats: Right Throws: Right

Professional debut
- MLB: August 7, 2018, for the San Diego Padres
- NPB: March 29, 2025, for the Saitama Seibu Lions

MLB statistics (through 2024 season)
- Win–loss record: 2–3
- Earned run average: 5.66
- Strikeouts: 127

NPB statistics (through August 21, 2026)
- Win–loss record: 1-5
- Earned run average: 1.60
- Strikeouts: 93
- Stats at Baseball Reference

Teams
- San Diego Padres (2018–2019); Detroit Tigers (2023); Boston Red Sox (2024); Chicago Cubs (2024); Saitama Seibu Lions (2025-present)

Anthony James Wingenter III (born April 15, 1994) is an American professional baseball pitcher for the Saitama Seibu Lions of Nippon Professional Baseball (NPB). He has previously played in Major League Baseball (MLB) for the San Diego Padres, Detroit Tigers, Boston Red Sox, and Chicago Cubs.

== Amateur career ==
Wingenter attended Bob Jones High School in Madison, Alabama, and played for the school's baseball team. In 2012, his senior year, he had a 9–0 win–loss record with a 0.47 earned run average (ERA). He was drafted by the Seattle Mariners in the 36th round of the 2012 Major League Baseball draft, but did not sign and played college baseball at Auburn University. In 2014, he played collegiate summer baseball with the Cotuit Kettleers of the Cape Cod Baseball League. In 2015, his junior year, he pitched to a 1–6 record with a 4.28 ERA in 21 games.

== Professional career ==
=== San Diego Padres ===
Wingenter was drafted by the San Diego Padres in the 17th round of the 2015 MLB draft.

Wingenter made his professional debut with the Arizona League Padres and was later promoted to the Tri-City Dust Devils; in 12 combined games between both teams, he posted a 1–2 record with a 7.23 ERA. He pitched 2016 with the Fort Wayne TinCaps, Lake Elsinore Storm and San Antonio Missions, pitching to a 3–1 record, a 1.70 ERA and a 1.06 WHIP in 39 games, and 2017 with San Antonio where he went 2–1 with a 2.45 ERA with 64 strikeouts in 47.2 innings (49 games), earning Texas League All-Star honors.

Wingenter began the 2018 season with the El Paso Chihuahuas of the Triple–A Pacific Coast League. The Padres promoted him to the major leagues on August 5. In 2019, Wingenter appeared in 51 games, recording an ERA of 5.65 despite averaging 12.7 strikeouts per nine.

On July 17, 2020, Wingenter underwent Tommy John surgery and would miss the 2020 season. On February 18, 2021, Wingenter was placed on the 60-day injured list as he continued to recover from Tommy John surgery.

On November 30, 2021, Wingenter was non-tendered by the Padres, making him a free agent.

=== Cincinnati Reds ===
On December 1, 2021, Wingenter signed a minor league contract with the Cincinnati Reds. Wingenter did not make an appearance for the Reds organization and elected free agency following the season on November 10, 2022.

=== Detroit Tigers ===
On January 15, 2023, Wingenter signed a minor league contract with the Detroit Tigers organization that included an invitation to spring training camp. On March 29, the Tigers announced that Wingenter had made the Opening Day roster. He made 6 appearances for the Tigers before he was placed on the injured list with right shoulder tendinitis on April 22. He was transferred to the 60-day injured list on May 31. On July 10, Wingenter was activated from the injured list and optioned to the Triple–A Toledo Mud Hens. In 17 games for the Tigers, he posted a 5.82 ERA with 22 strikeouts across 17.0 innings of work. Following the season on November 6, Wingenter was removed from the 40–man roster and sent outright to Triple–A. He elected free agency on November 7.

On December 15, 2023, Wingenter re–signed with the Tigers on a new minor league contract. In 26 relief outings for Triple–A Toledo, he recorded a 4–4 record and 3.31 ERA with 48 strikeouts across 32 2/3 innings pitched.

=== Boston Red Sox ===
On July 6, 2024, the Tigers traded Wingenter to the Boston Red Sox in exchange for minor league pitcher CJ Weins. On July 9, the Red Sox purchased Wingenter's contract, adding him to their active roster. Wingenter was sent down to the Triple-A Worcester Red Sox three days later after giving up three runs in one inning of work. On July 29, he was recalled to the major leagues after pitcher Greg Weissert was optioned to Worcester. On July 30, Wingenter was designated for assignment to clear roster space.

=== Chicago Cubs ===
On August 2, 2024, Wingenter was claimed off waivers by the Chicago Cubs. On September 4, the Cubs recalled him from the Triple–A Iowa Cubs. In 5 games for the Cubs, he compiled a 3.00 ERA with 3 strikeouts across 6 innings pitched. On November 20, Wingenter was designated for assignment by Chicago. Two days later, the Cubs non–tendered Wingenter, making him a free agent.

=== Saitama Seibu Lions ===
On January 6, 2025, Wingenter signed with the Saitama Seibu Lions of Nippon Professional Baseball.

On August 18, 2025 amid the regular season, Saitama Seibu announced that they signed a contract with Wingenter for the 2026 season. This is the second unusual mid-season contract of the franchise after they signed on June 23 with Tyler Nevin for the contract until the 2027.
