= Brendan White (baseball) =

American baseball player (born 1998)

Free agent
- Pitcher
- Born: November 18, 1998 (age 27); White Plains, New York, U.S.
- Bats: Right Throws: Right

MLB debut
- June 14, 2023, for the Detroit Tigers

MLB statistics (through 2023 season)
- Win–loss record: 2–3
- Earned run average: 5.09
- Strikeouts: 44
- Stats at Baseball Reference

Teams
- Detroit Tigers (2023)

Brendan James White (born November 18, 1998) is an American professional baseball pitcher who is a free agent. He has previously played in Major League Baseball (MLB) for the Detroit Tigers.

== Early life and amateur career ==
White grew up in Mahopac, New York. While still a high school student, he became a certified personal trainer. White played college baseball for Siena College. In 2017, he played collegiate summer baseball for the Danbury Westerners of the New England Collegiate Baseball League and a year later, in 2018, he played with the Wareham Gatemen of the Cape Cod Baseball League. As a junior with Siena, he had an earned run average (ERA) of 3.00 and set a school record with 93 strikeouts.

== Professional career ==
=== Detroit Tigers ===
The Detroit Tigers selected White in 26th round, with the 772nd overall pick, of the 2019 Major League Baseball draft.

White made his professional debut with the rookie–level Gulf Coast League Tigers, recording a 3.77 ERA in 14 games (five starts). White did not play in a game in 2020 due to the cancellation of the minor league season because of the COVID-19 pandemic. He returned to action in 2021 with the High–A West Michigan Whitecaps. In 26 games (18 starts), White registered a 3–9 record and 4.17 ERA with 107 strikeouts in 101 1/3 innings pitched.

White spent the 2022 season with the Double–A Erie SeaWolves, making 48 appearances out of the bullpen and logging a 2.67 ERA with 73 strikeouts and 9 saves in 67 1/3 innings of work. On November 15, 2022, the Tigers added White to their 40-man roster to protect him from the Rule 5 draft. White was optioned to the Triple-A Toledo Mud Hens to begin the 2023 season.

On May 3, 2023, White was promoted to the major leagues for the first time to serve as the 27th man in the Tigers' doubleheader against the New York Mets. White was returned to Toledo after the doubleheader without making an appearance in either game. On June 13, White was recalled back to the major leagues to take Garrett Hill's spot in the bullpen. White made his major league debut in the first game of the Tigers' doubleheader against the Atlanta Braves on June 14. In 33 appearances for Detroit in his rookie campaign, he posted a 5.09 ERA with 44 strikeouts across 40 2/3 innings pitched.

White was optioned to Triple–A Toledo to begin the 2024 season. He made eight appearances for Toledo before he was placed on the 7–day injured list with a right elbow strain on May 7, 2024. The Tigers recalled White and placed him on the 60-day injured list on August 13, to make room on the 40-man roster for Kerry Carpenter, who was coming off that list. He was designated for assignment by Detroit on November 19. On November 22, the Tigers non–tendered White, making him a free agent.

On December 13, 2024, White re–signed with the Tigers on a minor league contract. In 27 appearances for Triple-A Toledo, he struggled to a 1-3 record and 7.24 ERA with 27 strikeouts across 32 1/3 innings pitched. White was released by the Tigers organization on July 21, 2025.

=== Lancaster Stormers ===
On August 18, 2025, White signed with the Lancaster Stormers of the Atlantic League of Professional Baseball. In 10 appearances for the Barnstormers, White compiled a 2-0 record and 5.59 ERA with nine strikeouts across 9 2/3 innings of relief.

=== Seattle Mariners ===
On February 21, 2026, White signed a minor league contract with the Seattle Mariners. He made eight appearances for the Triple-A Tacoma Rainiers, posting a 1-0 record and 7.30 ERA with 10 strikeouts across 12 1/3 innings pitched. White was released by the Mariners organization on May 28.
