= Austin Meadows =

American baseball player (born 1995)

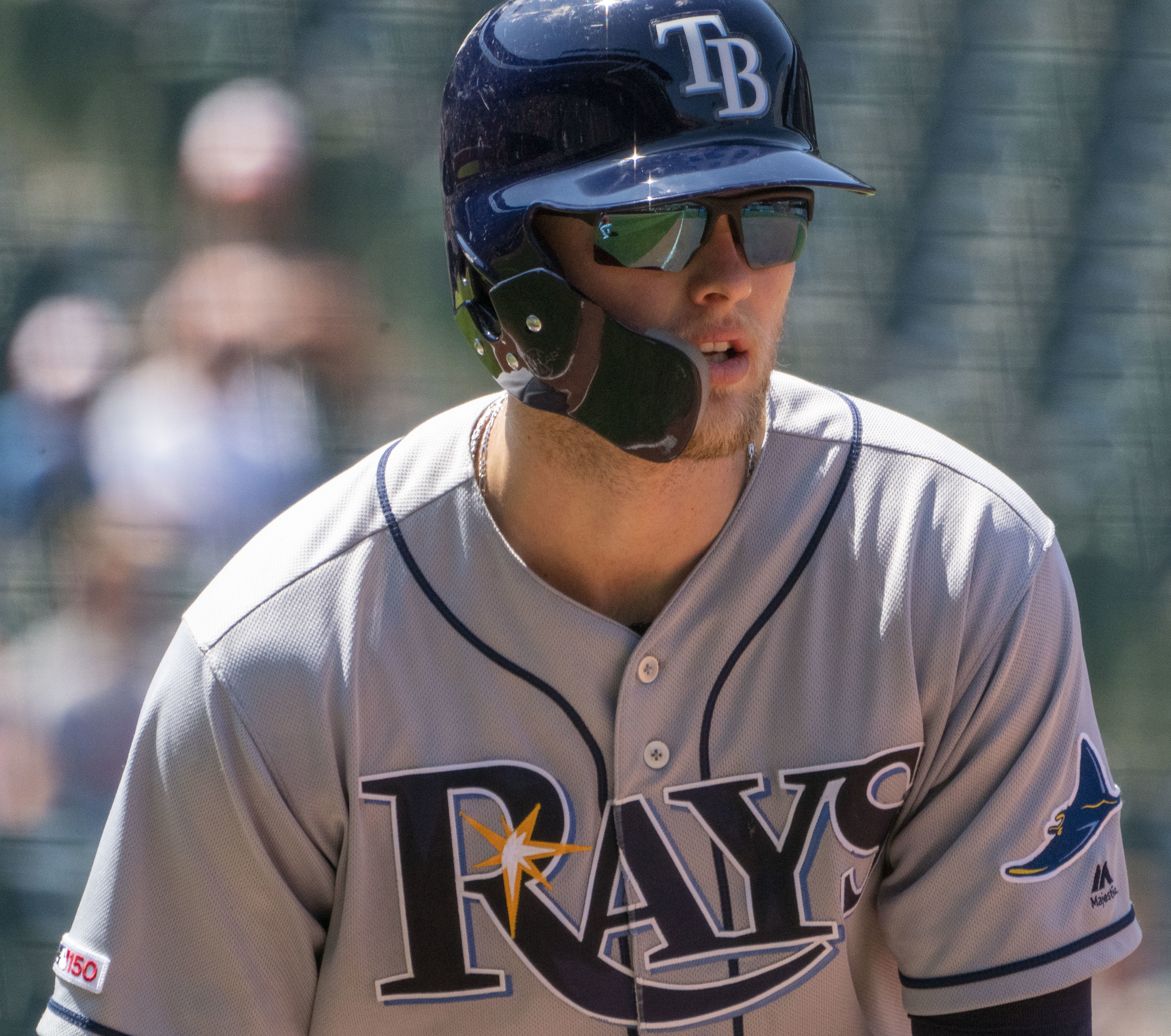
- Meadows with the Tampa Bay Rays in 2019
- Outfielder
- Born: May 3, 1995 (age 31); Grayson, Georgia, U.S.
- Batted: Left Threw: Left

MLB debut
- May 18, 2018, for the Pittsburgh Pirates

Last MLB appearance
- April 6, 2023, for the Detroit Tigers

MLB statistics
- Batting average: .259
- Home runs: 70
- Runs batted in: 238
- Stats at Baseball Reference

Teams
- Pittsburgh Pirates (2018); Tampa Bay Rays (2018–2021); Detroit Tigers (2022–2023)

Career highlights and awards
- All-Star (2019)
Medals
Men's baseball
Representing United States
World Youth Baseball Championship
| Gold medal – first place | 2011 Mexico | Team |

Austin Wade Meadows (born May 3, 1995) is an American former professional baseball outfielder. He played in Major League Baseball (MLB) for the Pittsburgh Pirates, Tampa Bay Rays, and Detroit Tigers. Meadows was an MLB All-Star in 2019.

== Early life and amateur career ==
Meadows grew up in Grayson, Georgia, where he competed in baseball with Clint Frazier. He attended Grayson High School, and led the school's baseball team to the Georgia Class 6A State semi-finals as a junior, hitting .390 with four home runs, 28 runs batted in (RBIs), and 19 stolen bases. Meadows was named a preseason First-Team High School All American by Rawlings and Perfect Game, and he hit .535 with 14 doubles, one triple, four home runs and 28 RBIs in his senior season.

Meadows also played football as a running back, wide receiver, and punter at Grayson where he was a teammate of Wayne Gallman and Robert Nkemdiche.

== Professional career ==
=== Pittsburgh Pirates ===
Meadows was considered one of the top prospects eligible for the 2013 Major League Baseball draft. The Pittsburgh Pirates selected him in the first round, with the ninth overall selection. Meadows was committed to attend Clemson University to play college baseball for the Clemson Tigers, but chose to forgo that commitment by signing with the Pirates, receiving a $3,029,600 signing bonus three weeks after the draft.

After signing with the Pirates, Meadows played for the Gulf Coast Pirates of the Rookie-level Gulf Coast League and the Jamestown Jammers of the Low–A New York–Penn League in 2013, compiling a combined .316 batting average with seven home runs and 22 RBIs in 48 games between both teams. He played for the West Virginia Power of the Single–A South Atlantic League in 2014, but missed a significant portion of the season due to a hamstring injury, playing only 38 games, batting .322/.388/.486 with three home runs and 15 RBIs. He played for the Bradenton Marauders of the High–A Florida State League (FSL) in 2015, and was named an FSL All-Star. He spent the final week of the season with the Altoona Curve of the Double–A Eastern League. In 121 games for Bradenton he slashed .307/.357/.407 with seven home runs and 54 RBIs, and in six games for Altoona he batted 360. After the regular season, he played for the Glendale Desert Dogs of the Arizona Fall League.

Meadows suffered a broken orbital bone in his right eye during spring training in 2016. He returned to Altoona and earned a promotion to the Indianapolis Indians of the Triple–A International League in June. In 45 games for Altoona he batted .311 with six home runs and 23 RBIs in 45 games, and in 37 games for Indianapolis, he compiled a .214 batting average with six home runs and 34 RBIs. The Pirates invited Meadows to spring training in 2017. Meadows returned to Indianapolis for the 2017 season, where he posted a .250 batting average with four home runs and 36 RBIs in 72 games. He missed nearly two months of the season due to hamstring and oblique strains. The Pirates added him to their 40-man roster after the 2017 season.

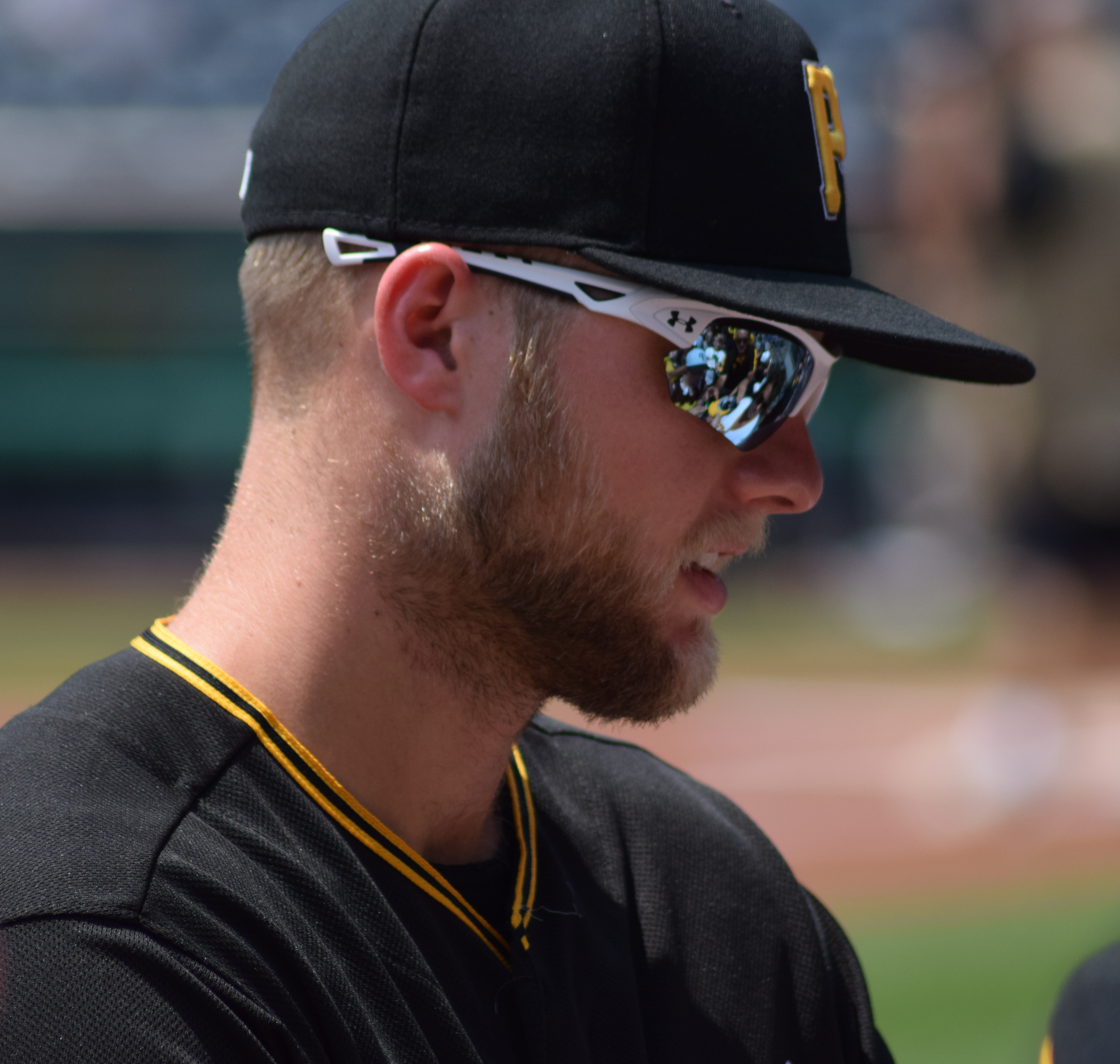
Meadows with the Pirates in 2018

MLB.com ranked Meadows as Pittsburgh's second best prospect going into the 2018 season. He began the season with Indianapolis and was promoted to the major leagues to make his debut on May 18. He recorded his first major league hit off of Tyson Ross, as well as his first stolen base, that same night. On May 20, 2018, he hit his first major league home run off of Jordan Lyles. Meadows was named the National League Rookie of the Month for the month of May after batting .409 with four home runs, seven RBIs, three doubles, and three stolen bases in 13 games during the month.

=== Tampa Bay Rays ===
On July 31, 2018, Meadows was traded to the Tampa Bay Rays, along with Tyler Glasnow and a player to be named later, later revealed to be Shane Baz, for Chris Archer, and was optioned to Triple-A Durham. Meadows was promoted to the Tampa Bay Rays on September 19. In ten games with the Rays, hit .250/.308/.417 with a home run and four runs batted in. Meadows ended the season slashing .287/.325/.461 with six home runs and 17 runs batted in over 59 games.

In 2019, Meadows made his first All-star game. He ended the 2019 season with career highs offensively. He led the team in average (.291), home runs (33), runs (83) and 89 runs batted in in 138 games.

On July 16, 2020, Meadows was placed on the injured list after he tested positive for COVID-19, which caused him to miss the beginning of the abbreviated 2020 season. After recovering from the illness, he returned to the Rays on August 4. During the season, Meadows hit .205/.296/.371 in 36 games.

In 2021 he had the lowest ground ball/fly ball ratio in the major leagues, at 0.54, and the lowest ground ball percentage, at 28.7%. He finished the 2021 season with a .234 batting average, with 27 home runs and 106 RBIs.

=== Detroit Tigers ===
On April 4, 2022, Meadows was traded to the Detroit Tigers in exchange for Isaac Paredes and a competitive balance round B pick in the 2022 MLB draft. After leaving the Tigers early in the season due to vertigo and later COVID-19, Meadows returned to the team in June only to go on the injured list again with tendinitis in his Achilles. He would not return to the Tigers the rest of the season, adding that he was suffering from mental health issues in addition to his physical ailments. In 36 games with the Tigers in 2022, Meadows batted .250 with no home runs.

On November 25, 2022, the Tigers and Meadows agreed on a one-year, $4.3 million contract for the 2023 season, avoiding salary arbitration. On April 8, 2023, Meadows was placed on the injured list with anxiety issues. The Tigers president of baseball operations Scott Harris issued a statement supporting Meadows' decision to step away from the game to seek help. On May 1, Meadows was transferred to the 60-day injured list. On September 9, it was announced that Meadows would not return to the Tigers in 2023. On November 17, 2023, it was announced that the Tigers would not tender Meadows a contract for the 2024 season, making him a free agent.

== Personal life ==
Meadows' mother, Staci, played softball for Georgia Southern University and Georgia State University, and works as an elementary school teacher in Grayson. His father, Kenny, played baseball and football for Morehead State University. His brother, Parker, was drafted by the Detroit Tigers in the second round of the 2018 MLB draft and currently plays in their organization. Meadows married his wife, Alexis, in December 2018. Meadows is a Christian.

Meadows grew up an Atlanta Braves fan.
