= Tyler Nevin =

American baseball player (born 1997)

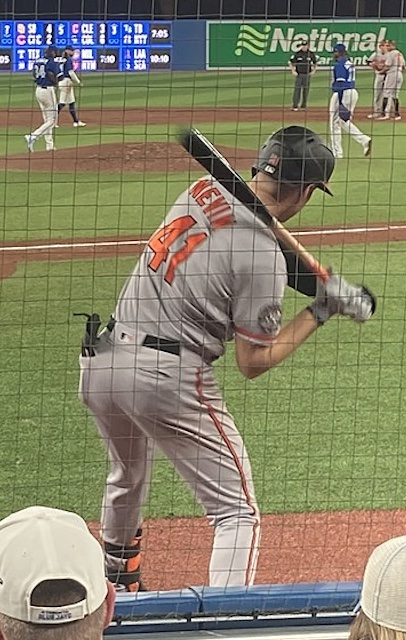
- Nevin with the Orioles in 2022

Saitama Seibu Lions – No. 26
- Infielder
- Born: May 29, 1997 (age 29); Poway, California, U.S.
- Bats: Right Throws: Right

Professional debut
- MLB: May 29, 2021, for the Baltimore Orioles
- NPB: March 28, 2025, for the Saitama Seibu Lions

MLB statistics (through 2024 season)
- Batting average: .204
- Home runs: 12
- Runs batted in: 49

NPB statistics (through August 21, 2026)
- Batting average: .278
- Home runs: 38
- Runs batted in: 102
- Stats at Baseball Reference

Teams
- Baltimore Orioles (2021–2022); Detroit Tigers (2023); Oakland Athletics (2024); Saitama Seibu Lions (2025–present)

Career highlights and awards
- 1× Pacific League Golden Glove Award (2025); 1× Pacific League Best Nine Award (2025)

Tyler Joseph Nevin (born May 29, 1997) is an American professional baseball infielder for the Saitama Seibu Lions of Nippon Professional Baseball (NPB). He has previously played in Major League Baseball (MLB) for the Baltimore Orioles, Detroit Tigers, and Oakland Athletics.

== Career ==
=== Amateur career ===
Nevin attended Poway High School in Poway, California. He underwent Tommy John surgery as a junior in 2014, forcing him to miss the whole season. As a senior, he had a .409 batting average, seven home runs, and 22 runs batted in (RBI).

=== Colorado Rockies ===
The Colorado Rockies selected Nevin in the first round, with the 38th overall selection, of the 2015 MLB draft. He signed with the Rockies for $2 million, forgoing his commitment to play college baseball at UCLA.

Nevin made his professional debut that year with the Grand Junction Rockies and spent the whole season there, batting .265 with two home runs and 18 RBI in 53 games. He played one game in 2016 for the Boise Hawks before his season was ended due to a hamstring injury. He began 2017 back with Boise, and after six games, was promoted to the Asheville Tourists where he finished the year batting .299/.353/.454 with eight home runs, 52 RBI, and ten stolen bases. He spent 2018 with the Lancaster JetHawks where he slashed .328/.386/.503 with 13 home runs and 62 RBI in 100 games. After the season, he played for the Salt River Rafters of the Arizona Fall League where he won the AFL batting title and finished second in MVP voting. He spent 2019 with the Hartford Yard Goats, hitting .251/.345/.399 with 13 home runs and 61 RBI over 130 games. On November 20, 2019, the Rockies added Nevin to their 40-man roster to protect him from the Rule 5 draft.

=== Baltimore Orioles ===
On August 30, 2020, the Rockies traded Nevin, Terrin Vavra and a player to be named later to the Baltimore Orioles in exchange for Mychal Givens. Minor-league outfielder Mishael Deson was sent to the Orioles to complete the transaction on September 18. He was assigned to the Triple-A Norfolk Tides to begin the 2021 season.

On May 28, 2021, Nevin was promoted to the major leagues for the first time, and was announced as the starting first baseman in that day's game against the Chicago White Sox. However, that day's game was postponed due to inclement weather. He made his MLB debut the next day, his 24th birthday. In the game, he notched his first MLB hit, a ground rule double off of White Sox starter Dallas Keuchel.

On October 3, 2021, in the final game of the year, Nevin hit his first major league home run off of Toronto Blue Jays starter Hyun-jin Ryu.

The Orioles optioned Nevin to Norfolk on August 31, 2022. On December 21, Nevin was designated for assignment following the acquisition of James McCann.

=== Detroit Tigers ===
On December 31, 2022, Nevin was traded by the Orioles to the Detroit Tigers in exchange for cash considerations. In 2023, he split time between Detroit and its Triple-A affiliate. At the major league level, he appeared in 41 games, batting .200/.306/.316 with 2 home runs and 10 RBI. He appeared in 87 games for the Triple-A Toledo Mud Hens, where he hit 15 home runs, drove in 58 runs while batting .326/.400/.543. On January 18, 2024, Nevin was designated for assignment following the waiver claim of Devin Sweet.

=== Oakland Athletics ===
On January 22, 2024, Nevin was traded back to the Baltimore Orioles in exchange for cash considerations. Despite a strong spring training in which he hit .333 across 23 games, Nevin did not make the Opening Day roster and was designated for assignment on March 28. On March 31, Nevin was claimed off waivers by the Oakland Athletics. From April 23 to May 1, Nevin had a nine–game hitting streak in which he had 14 hits, including 4 home runs and 7 RBI. Oakland went 6-3 over this span. On May 28, Nevin was designated for assignment by Oakland. He cleared waivers and was sent outright to the Triple–A Las Vegas Aviators on May 31. On June 18, the A's selected Nevin's contract, adding him back to their active roster. In 87 total games for Oakland, he slashed .204/.288/.331 with career–highs in home runs (7) and RBI (20). On November 1, Nevin was removed from the 40–man roster and sent outright to Las Vegas.

=== Saitama Seibu Lions ===
On January 8, 2025, Nevin signed with the Saitama Seibu Lions of Nippon Professional Baseball. On June 21, it was announced that Nevin, along with pitcher Tatsuya Imai, received the May Taiju Life Insurance Monthly MVP. On June 23, the team announced a two-year contract extension with Nevin starting in 2026.

== Personal life ==
Nevin is the son of Phil Nevin, a former MLB player and former Los Angeles Angels manager. Phil and A's manager Mark Kotsay were teammates in San Diego when Tyler was a boy. Upon Nevin joining the A's, Kotsay recalled him in the team's clubhouse as a child.

Nevin's signature move when he's on the base is to put the ring finger and pinky up while other fingers down, which he's known to do as a support for a rock band Blink-182 . Both the band and Nevin are from Poway, CA.

== See also ==
- List of second-generation Major League Baseball players
