= Matt Manning =

American baseball player (born 1998)

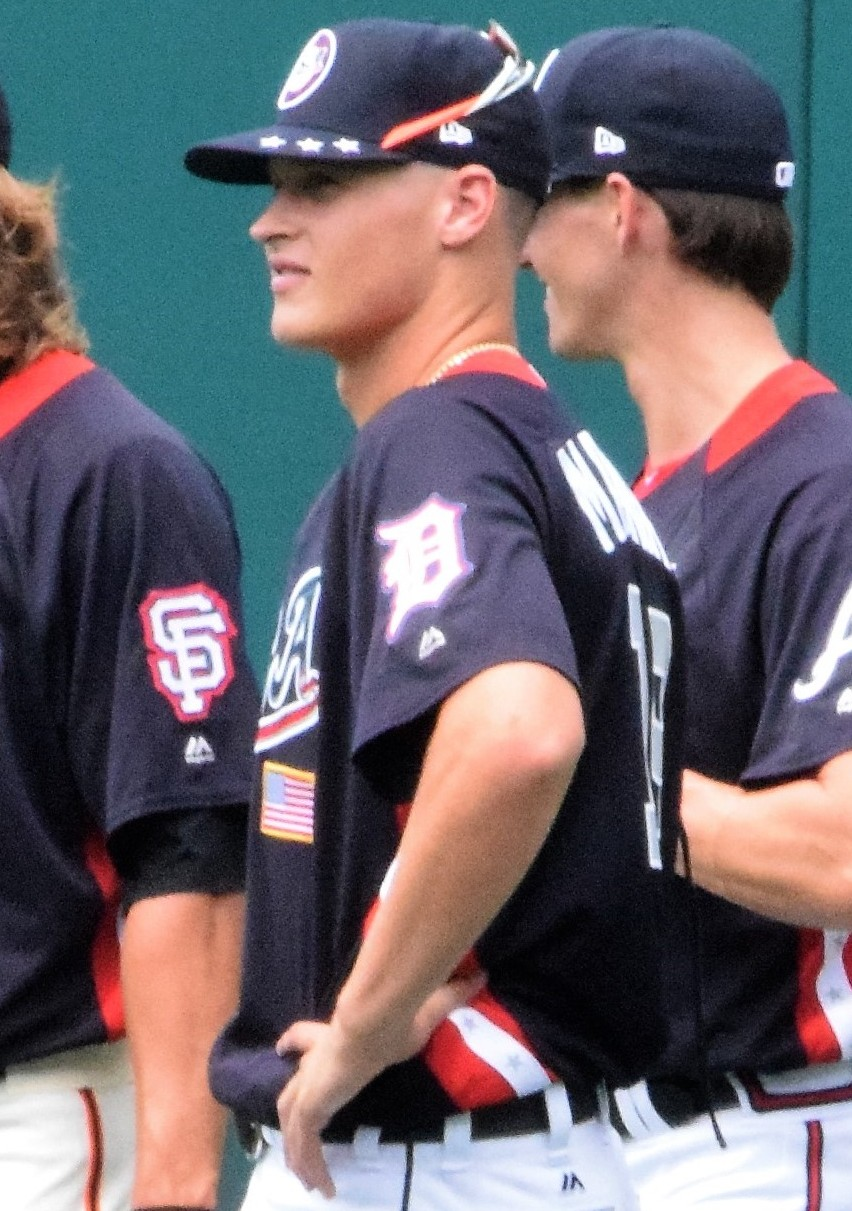
- Manning at the 2018 All-Star Futures Game

Free agent
- Pitcher
- Born: January 28, 1998 (age 28); Elk Grove, California, U.S.
- Bats: Right Throws: Right

MLB debut
- June 17, 2021, for the Detroit Tigers

MLB statistics (through 2024 season)
- Win–loss record: 11–15
- Earned run average: 4.43
- Strikeouts: 178
- Stats at Baseball Reference

Teams
- Detroit Tigers (2021–2024)

Career highlights and awards
- Pitched a combined no-hitter on July 8, 2023

Matthew George Manning (born January 28, 1998) is an American professional baseball pitcher who is a free agent. He has previously played in Major League Baseball (MLB) for the Detroit Tigers. The Tigers selected him in the first round of the 2016 MLB draft, and he made his MLB debut in 2021.

== Amateur career ==
Manning attended Sheldon High School in Sacramento, California. He played baseball and basketball in high school, and considered dropping baseball to focus on basketball after his freshman year. He began to focus on his pitching in his junior year. By his senior year, when he had a 1.91 earned run average (ERA) and 77 strikeouts in 40 1/3 innings pitched, his fastball could reach 99 miles per hour (159 km/h). He committed to attend Loyola Marymount University to play college baseball and college basketball.

== Professional career ==
=== Detroit Tigers ===
==== Minor leagues ====
The Detroit Tigers selected Manning with the ninth overall selection of the 2016 Major League Baseball draft. Manning signed with the Tigers rather than attend college, receiving a $3,505,800 signing bonus, the slot value for the ninth overall pick. After signing, the Tigers assigned Manning to the Gulf Coast Tigers of the Rookie-level Gulf Coast League, where he posted a 0–2 win–loss record with a 3.99 ERA in ten games started, pitching no more than three innings per start.

In 2017, Manning began the season in extended spring training, and spent time with both the Connecticut Tigers of the Low–A New York-Penn League and the West Michigan Whitecaps of the Single–A Midwest League, pitching to a combined 4–2 record and 3.18 ERA in 14 total starts between both teams. In 2018, he played for West Michigan, the Lakeland Flying Tigers of the High–A Florida State League, and the Erie SeaWolves of the Double–A Eastern League. He represented the Tigers at the 2018 All-Star Futures Game, striking out fellow Tigers' prospect Dawel Lugo. Manning had a 7–8 record with a 3.29 ERA and a 1.20 walks plus hits per innings pitched ratio in 22 total starts between the three clubs. He returned to Erie to begin 2019. Manning was named to the 2019 All-Star Futures Game. On August 28, Manning was named the 2019 Eastern League Pitcher of the Year. At the time of earning the honor, he had an 11–5 record with a 2.56 ERA while also leading the league in strikeouts (148) and WHIP (0.98). His ERA and batting average against (.192) were also tied for second-best in the league.

On January 16, 2020, he was a non-roster invitee of the Detroit Tigers to Spring Training before the season was postponed due to the coronavirus. The Tigers added him to their 40-man roster after the year.

==== 2021 ====
On June 15, 2021, it was announced that Manning would be promoted to the major leagues for the first time and make his MLB debut on June 17 as the starting pitcher against the Los Angeles Angels. In his debut, Manning pitched five innings, allowing two runs and striking out three, while taking the loss. In his next start on June 23, his home debut for the Tigers, Manning earned his first major league win over the St. Louis Cardinals, allowing two runs over 5 2/3 innings.

==== 2022 ====
Manning started the 2022 season in the Tigers rotation. On April 20, he was placed on the 10-day injured list due to right shoulder inflammation, retroactive to April 17. Due to suffering a setback in one of his rehab starts, Manning did not return to the Tigers until making a start against the Minnesota Twins on August 2. On August 24, Manning pitched six shoutout innings with a career-high eight strikeouts in a win over the San Francisco Giants.

==== 2023 ====
Manning made two starts for Detroit in 2023 before suffering a fracture in his right foot after being hit by a line drive on April 11. On April 29, Manning was placed on the 60-day injured list. He was activated ahead of a start against the Texas Rangers on June 27. On July 8, Manning pitched the first 6.2 innings of a combined no-hitter with relief pitchers Jason Foley and Alex Lange against the Toronto Blue Jays. On September 6, Manning's season was ended when another line drive fractured his foot for the second time. The hit by Giancarlo Stanton was measured at 119.5 miles per hour (192.3 km/h).

==== 2024 ====
Manning was optioned by the Tigers to Triple–A Toledo to begin the 2024 season after Casey Mize and Reese Olson won the final rotation spots. Manning was recalled on April 4 to start against the New York Mets as the 27th man in a doubleheader. He was recalled again to start in an April 13 doubleheader against the Minnesota Twins, and a third time for an April 30 doubleheader against the St. Louis Cardinals. In 5 total starts for Detroit, he logged an 0-1 record and 4.88 ERA with 23 strikeouts across 27 2/3 innings pitched.

==== 2025 ====
Manning was optioned to the Triple-A Toledo Mud Hens to begin the 2025 season. In 31 appearances (four starts) for Toledo, he posted a 2-2 record and 6.04 ERA with 52 strikeouts and two saves across 50 2/3 innings pitched. Manning was subsequently designated for assignment on July 31, 2025 following the acquisition of Paul Sewald from the Cleveland Guardians.

=== Philadelphia Phillies ===
On July 31, 2025, the Tigers traded Manning to the Philadelphia Phillies in exchange for Josueth Quinonez. In two starts for the Triple-A Lehigh Valley IronPigs, he struggled to an 0-1 record and 10.80 ERA with eight strikeouts over five innings of work. On September 12, Manning was designated for assignment by the Phillies. He cleared waivers and was sent outright to the Double-A Reading Fightin Phils on September 15. Manning elected free agency following the season on November 6.

=== Samsung Lions ===
On November 29, 2025, Manning signed with the Samsung Lions of the KBO League. In a practice game prior to the season, he suffered an elbow injury that would require Tommy John surgery and was subsequently ruled out for the season. He was released on July 10, 2026.

== Personal life ==
Manning is the son of Rich Manning, who played in the National Basketball Association. His older brother, Ryan, played basketball for the Air Force Falcons and his younger brother, Jake, plays volleyball at Georgetown College.

Awards and achievements
Preceded by Domingo Germán	No-hitter pitcher July 8, 2023 (with Jason Foley & Alex Lange)	Succeeded by Framber Valdez
