= Braden Bristo =

American baseball player (born 1994)

- Pitcher
- Born: November 1, 1994 (age 32); West Monroe, Louisiana, U.S.
- Batted: Right Threw: Right

MLB debut
- April 13, 2023, for the Tampa Bay Rays

Last MLB appearance
- June 14, 2023, for the Detroit Tigers

MLB statistics
- Win–loss record: 0–0
- Earned run average: 2.57
- Strikeouts: 5
- Stats at Baseball Reference

Teams
- Tampa Bay Rays (2023); Detroit Tigers (2023)

Braden James Bristo (born November 1, 1994) is an American former professional baseball pitcher. He played in Major League Baseball (MLB) for the Tampa Bay Rays and Detroit Tigers.

== Career ==
Bristo attended Ouachita Christian High School in Monroe, Louisiana and played college baseball at Louisiana Tech University. He played college baseball for the Louisiana Tech Bulldogs.

=== New York Yankees ===
The New York Yankees selected Bristo in the 23rd round of the 2016 Major League Baseball draft. Bristo spent his first professional season with the Pulaski Yankees in 2016, logging a 6.00 ERA across 10 appearances.

In 2017, Bristo split the year with the Single–A Charleston RiverDogs and the Low–A Staten Island Yankees. In 16 combined games, he registered a 2.64 ERA with 36 strikeouts and four saves in 30 2/3 innings pitched. He spent the 2018 season split between Charleston and the High–A Tampa Tarpons, accumulating a 2.14 ERA with 63 strikeouts and 7 saves in 54 2/3 innings across 35 appearances. In 2019 Bristo appeared for Tampa and the Double–A Trenton Thunder. He made 38 total appearances between the two affiliates, recording a 2.60 ERA with 84 strikeouts across 65 2/3 innings of work.

Bristo did not play a game in 2020 due to the cancellation of the minor league season because of the COVID-19 pandemic. He spent the 2021 season with the Triple–A Scranton/Wilkes-Barre RailRiders, appearing in 38 contests and posting a 4.86 ERA with 61 strikeouts in 50 innings pitched. Bristo returned to Scranton for the 2022 season, registering a 4.56 ERA with 64 strikeouts in 53 1/3 innings pitched across 41 games. He elected free agency following the season on November 10, 2022.

=== Tampa Bay Rays ===
On December 21, 2022, Bristo signed a minor league contract with the Tampa Bay Rays organization. The Rays selected his contract for promotion to the major league roster on April 13, 2023. Bristo debuted later that day in a game against the Boston Red Sox, striking out four over three hitless innings, gaining his first major league save. On April 29, Bristo was designated for assignment following the waiver claim of Javy Guerra.

=== Detroit Tigers ===
On May 1, 2023, Bristo was claimed off waivers by the Detroit Tigers, and was optioned to the Triple-A Toledo Mud Hens. On May 30, the Tigers recalled Bristo to the active roster to take over for Eduardo Rodríguez, who was placed on the injured list. In two games for Detroit, he allowed three runs (two earned) on five hits and three walks in 4.0 innings of work. Following a trade in which the Tigers acquired Blair Calvo from the Colorado Rockies, Bristo was designated for assignment by the team on June 18. He cleared waivers and was sent outright to Triple–A Toledo on June 25. In 38 games for Toledo, Bristo compiled a 7.19 ERA with 53 strikeouts across 41 1/3 innings pitched. He elected free agency following the season on November 6.

On April 23, 2024, Bristo announced his retirement from professional baseball.
