= James Rowson =

American baseball coach (born 1976)

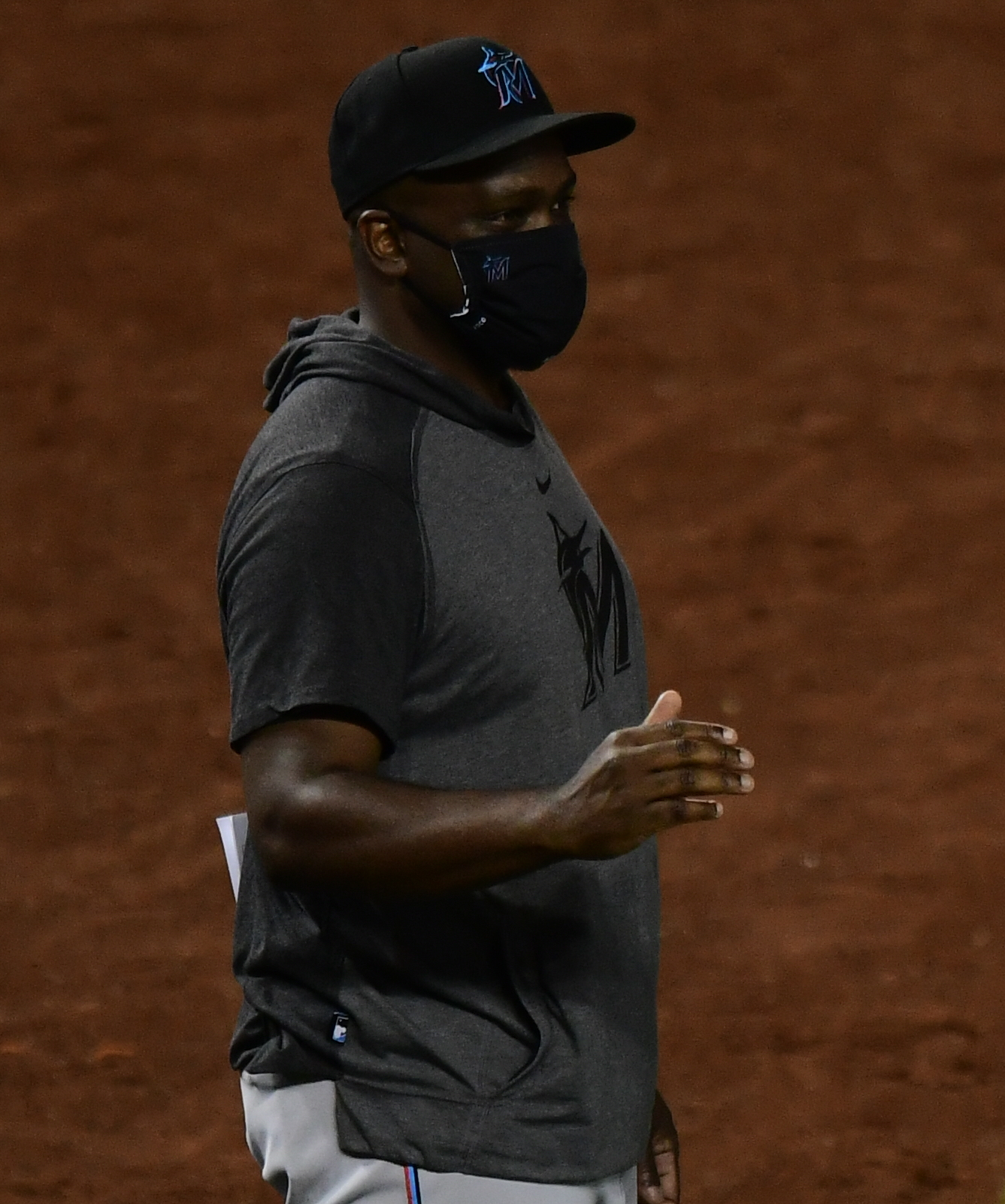
- Rowson with the Miami Marlins in 2020

San Francisco Giants
- Coach
- Born: September 12, 1976 (age 50); Mount Vernon, New York, U.S.
- Bats: Right Throws: Right
- Stats at Baseball Reference

Teams
- As coach: Chicago Cubs (2012–2013); Minnesota Twins (2017–2019); Miami Marlins (2020–2022); Detroit Tigers (2023); New York Yankees (2024–2026)

James Frank Rowson (born September 12, 1976) is an American professional baseball coach. He is the hitting coach for the San Francisco Giants of Major League Baseball (MLB). He was previously a coach in MLB for the Chicago Cubs, Minnesota Twins, Miami Marlins, Detroit Tigers and New York Yankees.

== Playing career ==
Rowson is from Mount Vernon, New York. He attended Mount Saint Michael Academy in the Bronx, a borough of New York City. The Seattle Mariners selected Rowson in the ninth round of the 1994 MLB draft. He played minor league baseball in the Mariners' and the New York Yankees' minor league systems from 1995 to 1997, and played for the Cook County Cheetahs in the independent Heartland League in 1998.

== Post-playing career ==
Rowson served as the Yankees' minor league hitting coordinator for six seasons, joining the Chicago Cubs as their minor league hitting coordinator for the 2012 season. He took over as the hitting coach of the Cubs in June 2012, after Rudy Jaramillo was fired. After the 2013 season, Rowson rejoined the Yankees as their minor league hitting coordinator.

The Minnesota Twins hired Rowson as their hitting coach before the 2017 season. In the offseason following the 2019 season, Rowson left the Twins to become the Marlins' bench coach. On November 15, 2022, the Detroit Tigers hired Rowson as an assistant hitting coach.

After the 2023 season, the Yankees hired Rowson as their hitting coach.

Following the 2026 season, Rowson was hired by the San Francisco Giants to serve as their offensive coordinator, overseeing the hitting department at the Major League level.
