= Scott Harris (baseball) =

American baseball executive

Detroit Tigers
- President of Baseball Operations
- Born: 1987 (age 38–39); Redwood City, California, U.S.

Teams
- Chicago Cubs (2018–2019) (Assistant General Manager); San Francisco Giants (2019–2022) (General Manager); Detroit Tigers (2022–present) (President of Baseball Operations)

Career highlights and awards
- World Series champion (2016)

Scott Harris (born 1987) is an American baseball executive who is the president of baseball operations for the Detroit Tigers of Major League Baseball. He previously served as general manager of the San Francisco Giants 2019 to 2022, a span that included the club’s 107-win 2021 season, and worked in the Chicago Cubs front office, including during their 2016 World Series championship.

== Early life and education ==
Harris is from Redwood City, California. He attended Menlo School, where he played soccer and lacrosse, and earned a bachelor's degree in economics from the University of California, Los Angeles.

He completed an MBA at Columbia University Graduate School of Business in 2015.

Harris played club lacrosse at UCLA.

== Career ==
Harris' first jobs in baseball were internships with the Washington Nationals and Cincinnati Reds. He worked for MLB from 2010 through 2012, in the Commissioner's Office as a coordinator of Major League Operations. In 2012, he joined the Chicago Cubs as director of baseball operations. He earned his Master of Business Administration from Columbia University's Graduate School of Business in 2015. He was promoted to assistant general manager in January 2018.

The Giants hired Harris as their general manager after the 2019 season.

On September 19, 2022, the Tigers hired Harris as their new president of baseball operations after having fired Al Avila a month prior.

=== Detroit Tigers (2022–present) ===
In Harris’s first full season leading baseball operations, Detroit went 78–84 in 2023, second in the American League Central.

The Tigers improved to 86–76 in 2024 and earned a Wild Card berth, their first postseason appearance since 2014.

In 2025, Detroit reached the Division Series for a second straight year before losing a 15-inning Game 5 to the Seattle Mariners.

==== Record as Head of Baseball Operations ====
Team	Year	Regular season					Postseason			
Team	Year	Games	Won	Lost	Win %	Finish	Won	Lost	Win %	Result
DET	2023	162	78	84	.481	2nd in AL Central	–	–	–	
DET	2024	162	86	76	.531	3rd in AL Central	4	3	.571	Lost ALDS (CLE）
DET	2025	162	87	75	.537	2nd in AL Central	4	4	.500	Lost ALDS (SEA）
DET	2026	55	21	34	.382		–	–	–	–
Total		541	272	269	.503		8	7	.533	

=== Executive philosophy ===
At his 2022 introductory news conference in Detroit, Harris outlined pillars for the organization that emphasized “dominating the strike zone” on both sides of the ball and building a development-focused environment.
