= Joey Wentz =

American baseball player (born 1997)

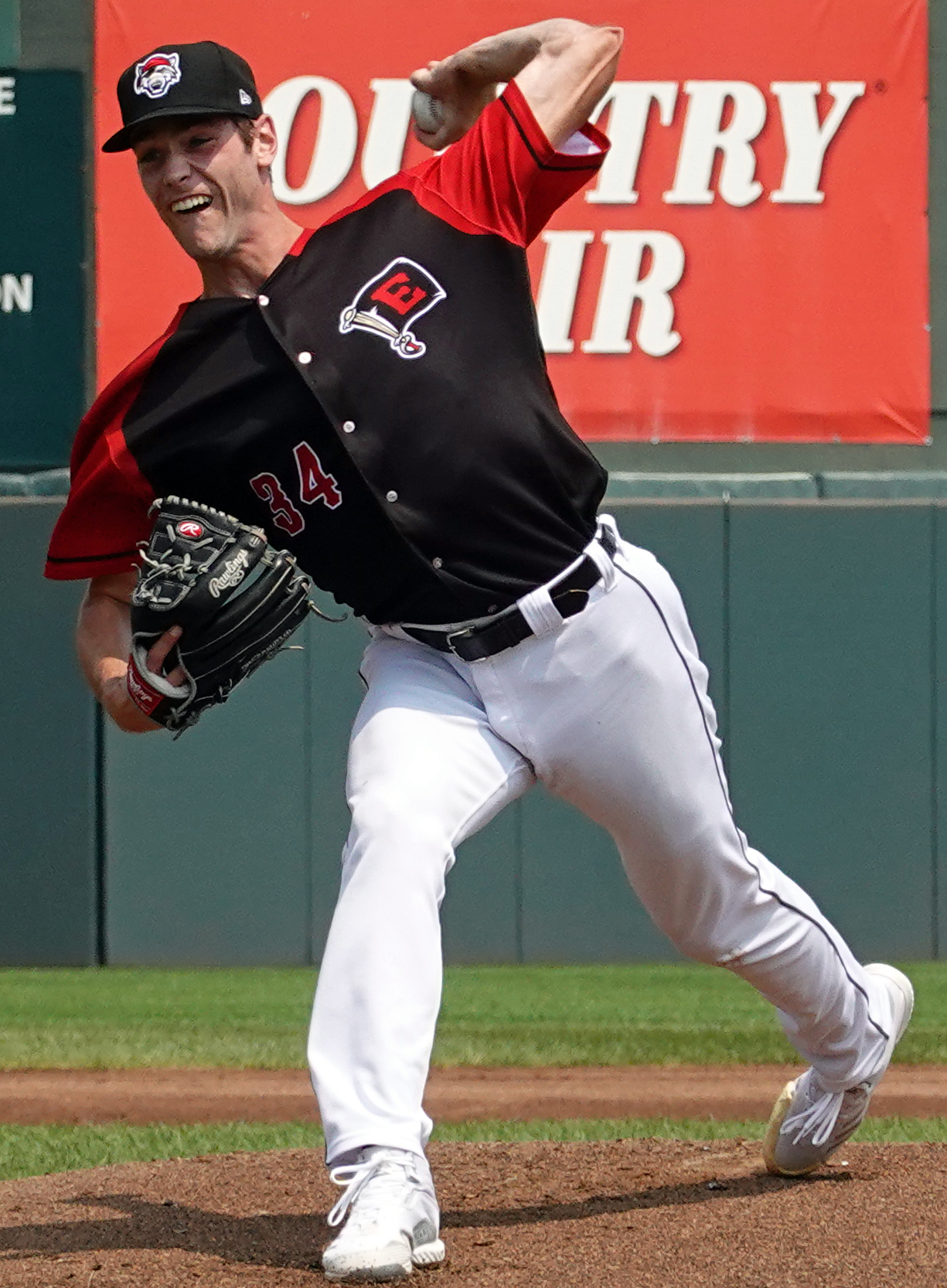
- Wentz with the Erie SeaWolves in 2021

Atlanta Braves – No. 33
- Pitcher
- Born: October 6, 1997 (age 29); Lawrence, Kansas, U.S.
- Bats: Left Throws: Left

MLB debut
- May 11, 2022, for the Detroit Tigers

MLB statistics (through 2025 season)
- Win–loss record: 11–24
- Earned run average: 5.57
- Strikeouts: 290
- Stats at Baseball Reference

Teams
- Detroit Tigers (2022–2024); Pittsburgh Pirates (2024–2025); Minnesota Twins (2025); Atlanta Braves (2025)

Joseph Barrett Wentz (born October 6, 1997) is an American professional baseball pitcher for the Atlanta Braves of Major League Baseball (MLB). He has previously played in MLB for the Detroit Tigers, Pittsburgh Pirates, and Minnesota Twins. The Braves selected Wentz with the 40th overall pick in the 2016 MLB draft and traded him to the Tigers in 2019, with whom he made his MLB debut in 2022.

== Early life ==
Wentz was born on October 6, 1997, to Dave and Jenny Wentz. He first met Riley Pint in second grade, and the two became friends.

Wentz attended Shawnee Mission East High School in Prairie Village, Kansas. He was named the Sunflower League Player of the Year in 2015 and 2016, his junior and senior years. Wentz won the 2015 Junior Home Run Derby at the 2015 Major League Baseball All-Star Game, hitting one home run that traveled 543 feet (166 m).

== Professional career ==
=== Atlanta Braves ===
Wentz committed to the University of Virginia. He had been scouted by Major League Baseball (MLB) teams prior to the 2016 MLB draft. Considered a likely first round pick, the Atlanta Braves selected him in the first Competitive Balance round, with the 40th overall selection. Wentz chose to sign with the Braves for $3.05 million rather than attend college. Wentz started his career with the Gulf Coast Braves of the Rookie-level Gulf Coast League and was later promoted to the Danville Braves of the Rookie-level Appalachian League. He finished the 2016 season with a 1–4 win–loss record, 3.68 earned run average, and 53 strikeouts in 44 innings pitched. Wentz spent 2017 with the Rome Braves, posting an 8–3 record with a 2.60 ERA in 26 starts, and 2018 with the Florida Fire Frogs where he was 3–4 with a 2.28 ERA in 16 starts.

=== Detroit Tigers ===
On July 31, 2019, the Braves traded Wentz and Travis Demeritte to the Detroit Tigers in exchange for Shane Greene. In his first full season at the Double–A level, Wentz went 7–8 with a 4.20 ERA and 137 strikeouts in 128 2/3 innings.

Wentz did not play in a game in 2020 due to the cancellation of the minor league season because of the COVID-19 pandemic. He did not participate in the Tigers' alternate training site during the year after undergoing Tommy John surgery in March. On November 20, 2020, the Tigers added Wentz to their 40-man roster to protect him from the Rule 5 draft. He was optioned to the Triple–A Toledo Mud Hens to begin the 2021 season. Working his way back from surgery, Wentz pitched a total of 18 games with the Single–A Lakeland Flying Tigers and Double–A Erie SeaWolves, posting an 0–7 record with a 5.25 ERA and 82 strikeouts in 72 innings.

On May 11, 2022, Wentz was recalled and promoted to the major leagues for the first time to start against the Oakland Athletics. In his third start for the Tigers on September 9, Wentz earned his first major league win against the Kansas City Royals, allowing no runs in 6 2/3 innings while striking out five. In 2023, Wentz pitched in 25 games (19 starts), going 3–13 with a 6.90 ERA and 98 strikeouts across 105 2/3 innings.

In 38 appearances for the Tigers in 2024, Wentz struggled to a 5.37 ERA with 60 strikeouts over 55 1/3 innings pitched. Wentz was designated for assignment by Detroit on August 30.

=== Pittsburgh Pirates ===
On September 3, 2024, Wentz was claimed off waivers by the Pittsburgh Pirates, and due to being out of minor league options, he reported directly to the major league team. In eight appearance down the stretch, Wentz recorded a 1.50 ERA with 13 strikeouts over 12 innings of work.

Wentz made 19 appearances for Pittsburgh to begin the 2025 season, posting a 2-1 record and 4.15 ERA with 22 strikeouts over 26 innings of work. Wentz was designated for assignment by the Pirates on June 7, 2025.

=== Minnesota Twins ===
On June 11, 2025, Wentz was claimed off waivers by the Minnesota Twins. In six appearances for Minnesota, he struggled to a 15.75 ERA with six strikeouts over eight innings of work. Wentz was designated for assignment by the Twins on July 9.

=== Atlanta Braves (second stint) ===
On July 11, 2025, Wentz was claimed off waivers by the Atlanta Braves. He made his Braves debut the next day, pitching three scoreless innings and recording six strikeouts, establishing the franchise record for strikeouts in a debut by a reliever.

During spring training in 2026, Wentz collided with Taylor Walls in a game against the Tampa Bay Rays. On March 9, 2026, Wentz was diagnosed with an torn ACL and was ruled out for the entire season.
