= Reese Olson =

American baseball player (born 1999)

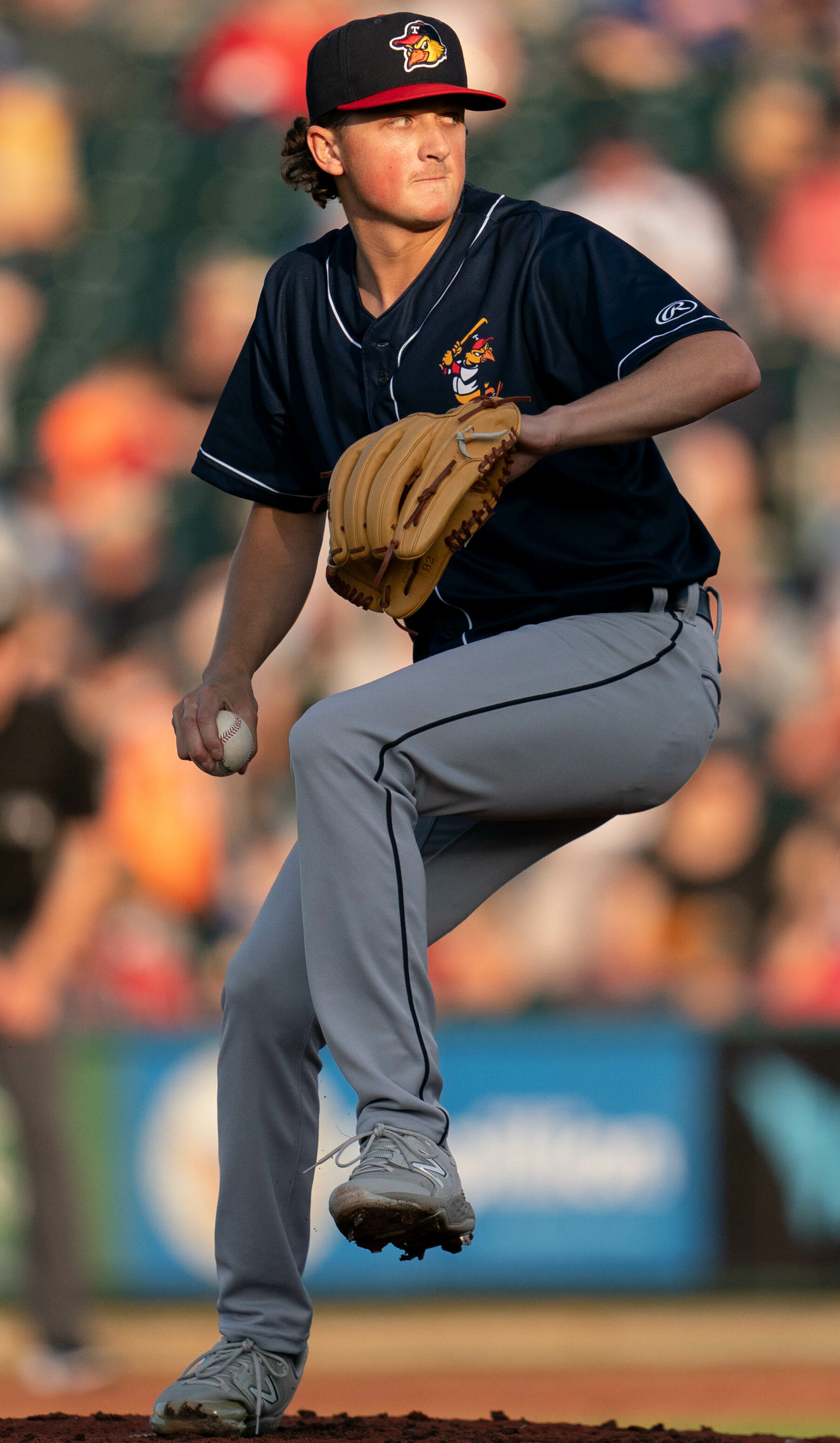
- Olson with the Toledo Mud Hens in 2023

Detroit Tigers – No. 45
- Pitcher
- Born: July 31, 1999 (age 27); Gainesville, Georgia, U.S.
- Bats: Right Throws: Right

MLB debut
- June 2, 2023, for the Detroit Tigers

MLB statistics (through 2025 season)
- Win–loss record: 13–19
- Earned run average: 3.60
- Strikeouts: 269
- Stats at Baseball Reference

Teams
- Detroit Tigers (2023–2025)

William Reese Olson (born July 31, 1999) is an American professional baseball pitcher for the Detroit Tigers of Major League Baseball (MLB). He made his MLB debut in 2023.

== Career ==
=== Early career ===
Olson was born in Gainesville, Georgia, and attended North Hall High School. He was drafted by the Milwaukee Brewers in the 13th round of the 2018 MLB draft. In 2019, Olson started 14 games for High-A Wisconsin Timber Rattlers, posting a 4–7 record with a 4.66 ERA and 84 strikeouts over 94 innings. He did not play in a game in 2020 due to the cancellation of the minor league season because of the COVID-19 pandemic.

In 2021, Olson started 14 games for High-A Wisconsin Timber Rattlers, posting a 5–4 record with a 4.30 ERA and 79 strikeouts over 69 innings.

=== Detroit Tigers ===
On July 31, 2021, the Brewers traded Olson to the Detroit Tigers in exchange for Daniel Norris. He was assigned to the High-A West Michigan Whitecaps. He was ranked the organization's thirteenth best prospect in MLB.com's mid-season 2021 update.

Olson spent the entire 2022 season with the Double–A Erie SeaWolves. In 26 appearances (25 starts), he registered an 8–6 record and 4.14 ERA with 168 strikeouts in 119 2/3 innings pitched. He was named the 2022 MiLB Gold Glove as the best defensive pitcher in the minor leagues. On November 15, 2022, the Tigers added Olson to their 40-man roster to protect him from the Rule 5 draft.

Olson was optioned to the Triple-A Toledo Mud Hens to begin the 2023 season. In 10 starts, he struggled to a 6.38 ERA with 47 strikeouts in 36 2/3 innings of work. On May 31, the Tigers announced that Olson would be promoted to the major leagues for the first time to start two days later against the Chicago White Sox. In his first major league start, Olson gave up 2 hits and 2 earned runs in 5 innings while striking out 6 batters. He took the loss, as the Tigers offense scored zero runs in the game. On the season, Olson made 21 appearances (18 starts) at the major league level, posting a 5–7 record with a 3.99 ERA, a 1.119 WHIP and 103 strikeouts in 103 2/3 innings.

Entering the 2024 season, Olson made the Tigers' Opening Day roster as part of their rotation, beating out Matt Manning for one of the final spots. He made 22 starts for the Tigers this season, compiling a 4–8 record with a 3.53 ERA, a 1.184 WHIP and 101 strikeouts in 112 1/3 innings.

Olson began the 2025 season as the Tigers' No. 3 starter. On May 19, the Tigers placed Olson on the 15-day injured list with right ring finger inflammation. He returned from the injured list on July 4. Olson made 13 starts for Detroit, compiling a 4-4 record and 3.15 ERA with 65 strikeouts across 68 2/3 innings pitched. On July 28, Olson was placed on the 60-day injured list due to a right shoulder strain.

On February 10, 2026, it was announced that Olson would miss the entirety of the 2026 season after undergoing a right shoulder labral repair.

== Pitch selection ==
Olson throws four-seam and sinking two-seam fastballs both in the 93–95 MPH (150–153 KPH) range, topping out around 97 MPH (156 KPH). In 2025, he's thrown the sinker twice as often as the four-seamer. His main offspeed pitches are a slider in the 83–87 MPH (134–140 KPH) range and a changeup from 84 to 88 MPH (135 to 142 KPH). He also throws an occasional curveball averaging 78–80 MPH (126–129 KPH).

== Personal life ==
Olson married his wife, Autumn, in December 2025 in Gainesville, Georgia.
