= Jason Foley =

American baseball player (born 1995)

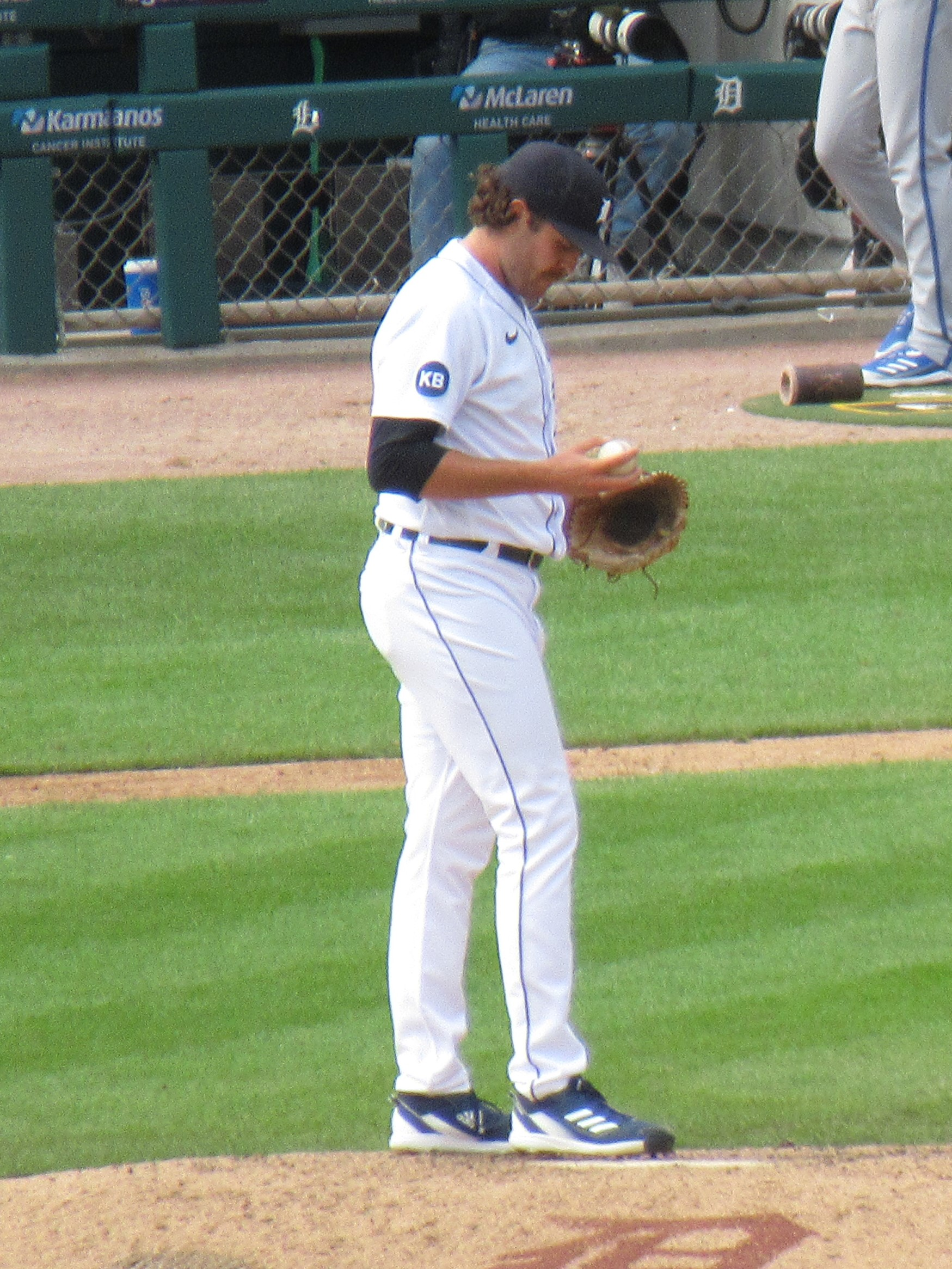
- Foley with the Detroit Tigers in 2022

Free agent
- Pitcher
- Born: November 1, 1995 (age 30); Manhasset, New York, U.S.
- Bats: Right Throws: Right

MLB debut
- June 6, 2021, for the Detroit Tigers

MLB statistics (through 2026 season)
- Win–loss record: 10–11
- Earned run average: 3.27
- Strikeouts: 165
- Stats at Baseball Reference

Teams
- Detroit Tigers (2021–2024); San Francisco Giants (2026)

Career highlights and awards
- Pitched a combined no-hitter on July 8, 2023

Jason Joseph Foley (born November 1, 1995) is an American professional baseball pitcher who is a free agent. He has previously played in Major League Baseball (MLB) for the Detroit Tigers and San Francisco Giants.

== Amateur career ==
Foley attended Mepham High School in his hometown of North Bellmore, New York, where he played for the school's baseball team. He enrolled at Sacred Heart University to play college baseball for the Sacred Heart Pioneers. Foley had a 10–14 win–loss record over his Sacred Heart career, starting 37 of his 48 appearances over his three seasons, with a 4.84 career earned run average (ERA) and 7.33 strikeouts per nine innings pitched. He played collegiate summer baseball with the Mystic Schooners of the New England Collegiate Baseball League. After his junior season Foley went unselected in the MLB draft. He worked with former professional pitcher Dennis Long, the pitching coach of the Schooners, who helped increase his velocity to 97 mph. Manager Phil Orbe & assistant coach Stephen Leonetti were also on staff. Scouts came to a handful of games at Mystic and Foley was dominant in front of the Tigers Area Scout. The Tigers were so impressed by Foley's performances with Mystic that the organization immediately signed him.

== Professional career ==
=== Detroit Tigers ===
==== Minor leagues ====
Foley pitched in six games during the 2016 professional season, primarily at the Low-A level with the Connecticut Tigers, but Foley turned heads in 2017 at the Single-A level with the West Michigan Whitecaps. Over 18 appearances and 29 innings, Foley logged a 1.55 ERA with five saves, 36 strikeouts to just five walks, and recorded a WHIP of 0.86, giving up just five earned runs during the duration of the season. He moved to the High-A Lakeland Flying Tigers at the end of the season, where he gave up five runs over 7 1/3 innings of work. Ahead of the 2018 season, however, Foley underwent Tommy John surgery and saw no professional action the full season.

Previously praised for his velocity by media outlets, hitting 101 MPH on his fastball, before his surgery, Foley lost velocity upon his return in 2019 with Lakeland, however he remained healthy for the full season. Foley finished 2019 with a 3–3 record, a 3.89 ERA, 43 strikeouts, and two saves over 36 appearances, all in relief. He averaged just under a strikeout per inning, and recorded a WHIP of 1.43. Foley did not play in a game in 2020 due to the cancellation of the minor league season because of the COVID-19 pandemic. However, in 2021, Foley was added to the alternate-site Detroit Tigers roster in Toledo, where players both on the 40-man roster but inactive and off the roster (like Foley) played games to remain fit. In addition, with the first appearance of the season for Casey Mize and his subsequent graduation from the MLB.com Top 30 Prospects rankings for the Tigers, Foley entered the list at #30.

==== Major leagues ====
On June 6, 2021, the Tigers selected Foley's contract and promoted him to the major leagues for the first time. At the time of his promotion, Foley had a 3.60 ERA, 1.40 WHIP, and ten strikeouts in nine appearances (ten innings pitched) with the Toledo Mud Hens. He made his MLB debut that day, pitching a scoreless inning of relief against the Chicago White Sox. Foley pitched in middle relief for the 2022 Tigers, appearing in 60 games and posting a 3.88 ERA with 43 strikeouts.

Foley recorded his first major league save on April 18, 2023, pitching a 1-2-3 ninth inning against the Cleveland Guardians to preserve a 1–0 Tigers victory. On July 8, 2023, Foley was the second of three pitchers to throw a combined no-hitter against the Toronto Blue Jays, pitching 1 1/3 innings. For the 2023 season, Foley posted a 3–3 record and a 2.61 ERA. He recorded 7 saves and struck out 55 batters in 69 innings.

In 2024, Foley primarily filled the role of closer for the Tigers. He posted 28 saves in 32 save opportunities, with a 3.15 ERA and 46 strikeouts in 60 innings pitched.

On January 9, 2025, the Tigers and Foley agreed to a one-year, $3.15 million contract, avoiding arbitration. He was optioned to Triple-A Toledo to begin the season. Foley made five scoreless appearances for Toledo, striking out nine in 6 2/3 innings. On May 13, it was announced that Foley would undergo season-ending shoulder surgery. He was designated for assignment by the Tigers on November 18. On November 21, he was non-tendered by Detroit and became a free agent.

=== San Francisco Giants ===
On December 16, 2025, the San Francisco Giants signed Foley to a one-year, $2 million contract. On July 12, 2026, Foley was activated from the injured list for his return from surgery. Following the season, Foley cleared waivers and was outrighted to AAA, becoming a minor league free agent in the process.

== Pitch selection ==
Foley throws a sinking two-seam fastball and an occasional four-seam fastball that each average 96 to 98 miles per hour (MPH), topping out at 101 MPH. His main offspeed pitch is a slider that averages 87 to 89 MPH. He also throws a changeup at 89 to 92 MPH. He mostly pitches to contact (6.8 K/9 IP) and is a ground-ball pitcher, giving up only 20.1% fly balls to 53.7% ground balls for his career.

Awards and achievements
Preceded by Domingo Germán	No-hitter pitcher July 8, 2023 (with Alex Lange & Matt Manning)	Succeeded by Framber Valdez
