= Zack Short =

American baseball player (born 1995)

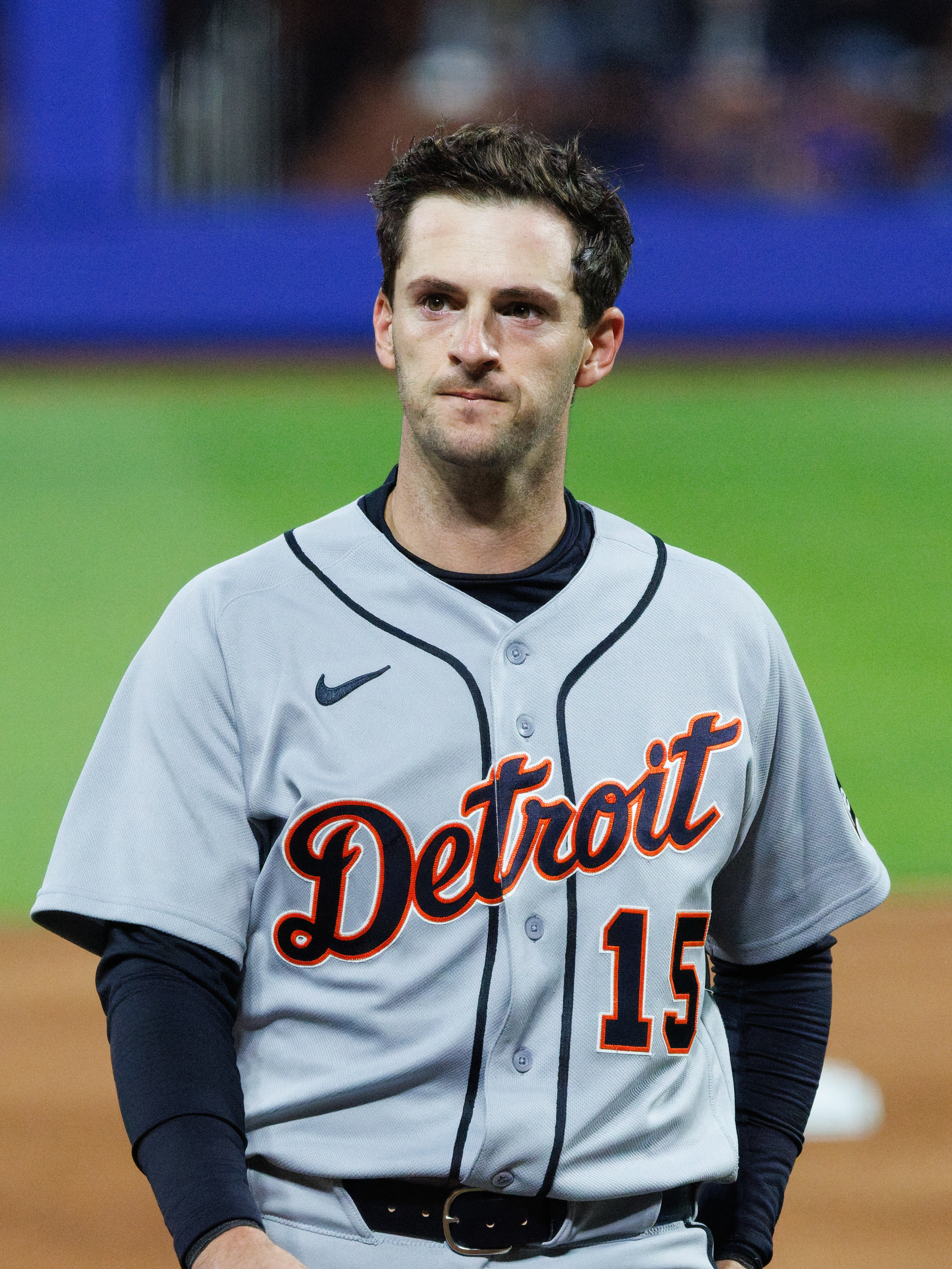
- Short with the Detroit Tigers in 2026

Free agent
- Infielder
- Born: May 29, 1995 (age 31); Kingston, New York, U.S.
- Bats: Right Throws: Right

MLB debut
- April 21, 2021, for the Detroit Tigers

MLB statistics (through 2026 season)
- Batting average: .169
- Home runs: 15
- Runs batted in: 69
- Stats at Baseball Reference

Teams
- Detroit Tigers (2021–2023); New York Mets (2024); Boston Red Sox (2024); Atlanta Braves (2024); Houston Astros (2025); Detroit Tigers (2026); New York Mets (2026)

Zachary Ryan Short (born May 29, 1995) is an American professional baseball infielder who is a free agent. He has previously played in Major League Baseball (MLB) for the Detroit Tigers, New York Mets, Boston Red Sox, Atlanta Braves, and Houston Astros.

== Amateur career ==
Short attended Kingston High School in Kingston, New York, At Kingston High School, Short co-captained the varsity baseball team to the 2012 New York State Class AA championship, the first in the school’s history.

Short went to Sacred Heart University, where he played college baseball for the Sacred Heart Pioneers. In 2015, he played collegiate summer baseball with the Chatham Anglers of the Cape Cod Baseball League.

== Professional career ==
=== Chicago Cubs ===
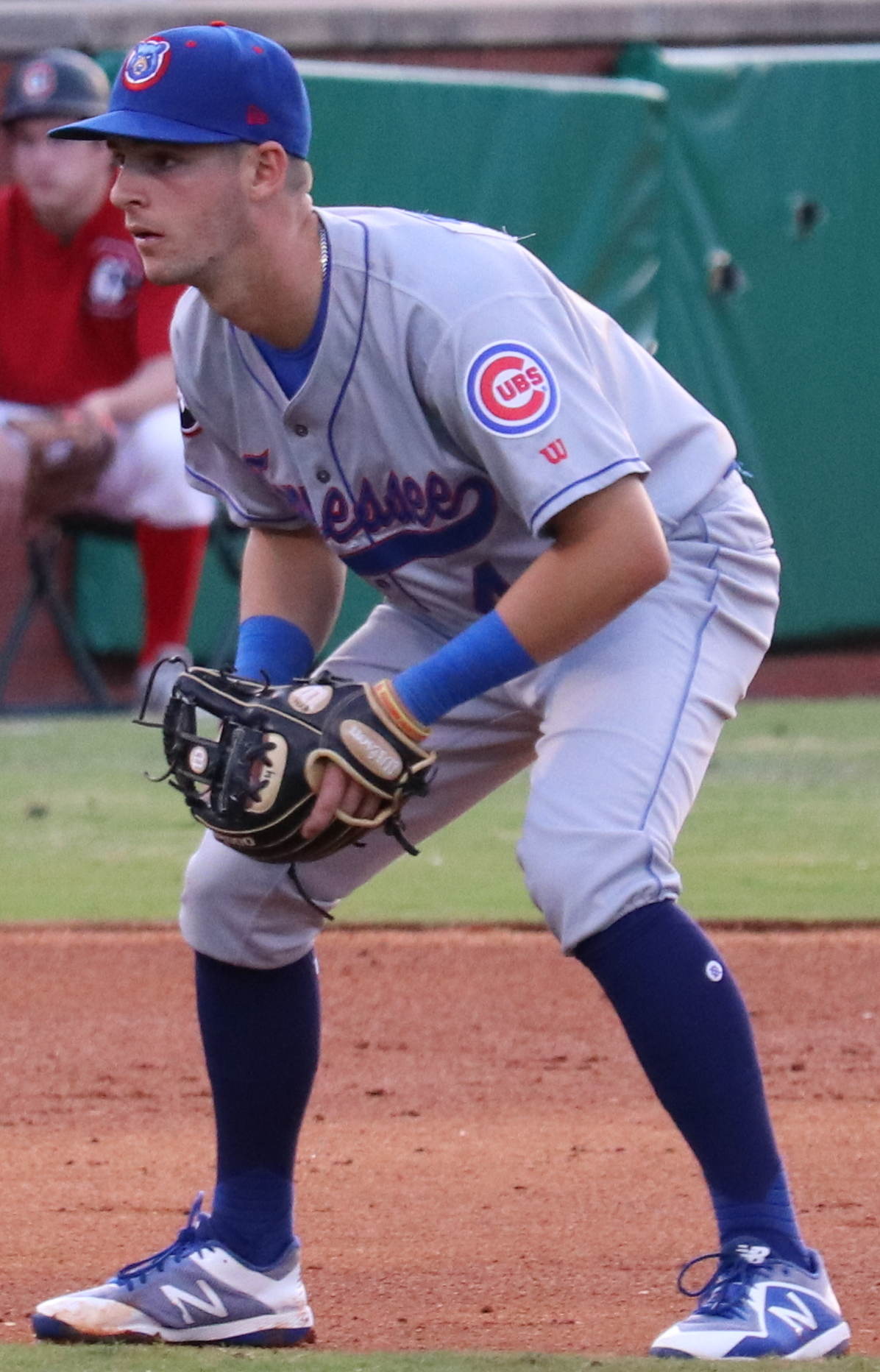
Short with the Tennessee Smokies in 2018

The Chicago Cubs selected Short in the 17th round of the 2016 Major League Baseball draft. After signing, Short spent his first professional season with both the Arizona League Cubs and Eugene Emeralds where he batted .257 with one home run and 31 RBIs in 53 games. He played 2017 with the South Bend Cubs and Myrtle Beach Pelicans, hitting for a combined .250/.383/.419 with 13 home runs, 47 RBIs, and 18 stolen bases in 131 games, and 2018 with the Tennessee Smokies, hitting .227 with 17 home runs and 59 RBIs in 124 games.

The Cubs invited Short to spring training in 2019. He began 2019 with the Iowa Cubs, but also spent time with Tennessee and in the Arizona League while rehabbing. Over 63 games in total for the season, Short batted .235 with six home runs and 25 RBIs. Following the season, he played in the Arizona Fall League with the Mesa Solar Sox.

Short was added to Chicago's 40–man roster following the 2019 season.

=== Detroit Tigers ===
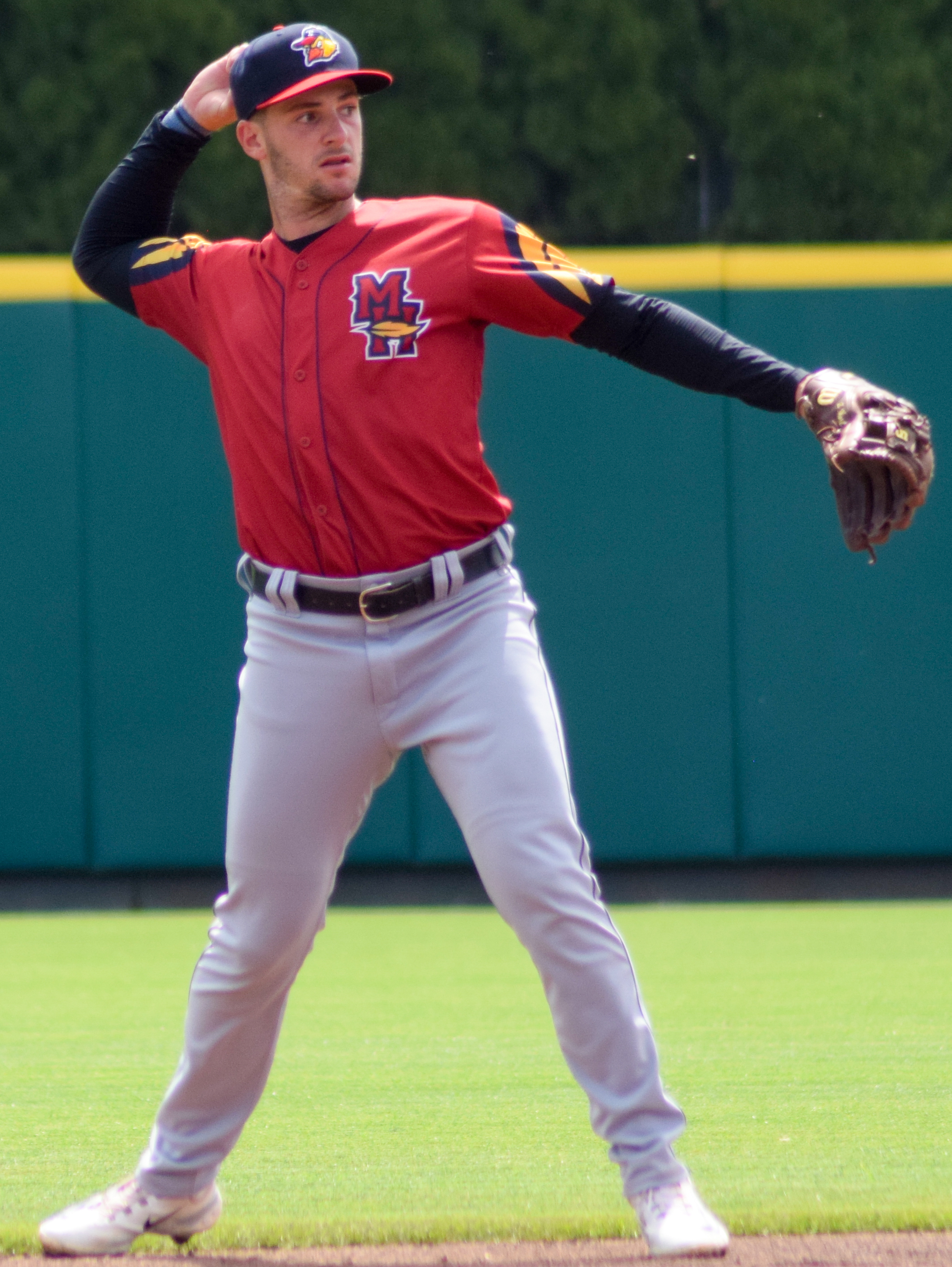
Short with the Toledo Mud Hens in 2023

On August 31, 2020, the Cubs traded Short to the Detroit Tigers for Cameron Maybin shortly before the trade deadline. He did not play a game in 2020 due to the cancellation of the minor league season because of the COVID-19 pandemic.

On April 21, 2021, Short was promoted to the major leagues for the first time. He made his MLB debut that day as the starting third baseman against the Pittsburgh Pirates. On April 23, Short recorded his first MLB hit, a single off of Kansas City Royals starter Mike Minor. On June 26, Short recorded his first MLB home run, a two-run home run, off Houston Astros starter Framber Valdez. He finished the 2021 season with a .141 batting average in 61 games.

Short spent the majority of the 2022 season with the Triple–A Toledo Mud Hens, playing in 128 games and hitting .229/.355/.373 with 11 home runs, 60 RBI, and 11 stolen bases. He appeared in six major-league contests with the Tigers, going hitless with two RBI and two walks in 13 plate appearances.

Short was optioned to Triple–A Toledo to begin the 2023 season. In 112 games for the Tigers, he batted .204/.292/.339 with career–highs in home runs (7), RBI (33), and stolen bases (5).

=== New York Mets ===
On November 6, 2023, Short was claimed off waivers by the New York Mets. On March 24, 2024, it was announced that Short had made the team's Opening Day roster. In 10 appearances for the Mets, he went 1–for–9 (.111) with two walks. On April 26, Short was designated for assignment to clear roster space for J. D. Martinez.

=== Boston Red Sox ===
On May 1, 2024, the Mets traded Short to the Boston Red Sox in exchange for cash considerations. On May 8, after appearing in two games for Boston and going 0–for–7, the Red Sox designated Short for assignment.

=== Atlanta Braves ===
On May 9, 2024, the Red Sox traded Short to the Atlanta Braves in exchange for cash considerations. On May 12, he made his Braves debut against the New York Mets. In 30 games with Atlanta, Short batted .148/.313/.204 with five RBI. On July 25, Short was designated for assignment by the Braves. He cleared waivers and was sent outright to the Triple–A Gwinnett Stripers on July 27. Short elected free agency following the season on November 4.

=== Houston Astros ===
On January 7, 2025, Short signed a minor league contract with the Houston Astros organization. In 73 appearances for the Triple-A Sugar Land Space Cowboys, he batted .211/.356/.402 with 12 home runs, 35 RBI, and three stolen bases. On July 2, the Astros selected Short's contract, adding him to their active roster. In 22 appearances for Houston, he batted .220/.291/.380 with two home runs and seven RBI. On August 1, Short was designated for assignment by the Astros. He cleared waivers and was sent outright to Triple-A Sugar Land on August 4. Short elected free agency on October 3.

=== Washington Nationals ===
On December 12, 2025, Short signed a minor league contract with the New York Yankees. On March 24, 2026, the Yankees traded Short to the Washington Nationals in exchange for cash considerations. He made 21 appearances for the Triple-A Rochester Red Wings, batting .200/.292/.291 with one home run, seven RBI, and two stolen bases.

=== Detroit Tigers (second stint) ===
On May 1, 2026, the Nationals traded Short to the Detroit Tigers in exchange for cash considerations or a player to be named later; he was subsequently assigned to the Triple-A Toledo Mud Hens. On May 3, the Tigers selected Short's contract, adding him to their active roster. He went 0-for-3 across two appearances for Detroit, and was designated for assignment by the team on May 5. Short cleared waivers and elected free agency on May 7. He was re-signed to Detroit's active roster the following day. Across 23 total appearances for Detroit, Short slashed .167/.304/.222 with two RBI. He was designated for assignment by the Tigers on June 12.

=== New York Mets (second stint) ===
On June 15, 2026, Short was claimed off of waivers by the New York Mets. In the eighth inning of a 15–3 game against the Philadelphia Phillies, Short was brought in as a pitcher for the first time in his career. He recorded three consecutive outs without giving up a hit or a walk. On June 24, Short was designated for assignment by the Mets following Francisco Lindor's activation from the injured list. He cleared waivers and was sent outright to the Triple-A Syracuse Mets on June 27. On July 10, he had his contract selected back to the major league roster. On July 16, Short was designated for assignment. He cleared waivers and was sent outright to Triple-A Syracuse on July 20. He elected free agency on September 29.
