= Garrett Hill =

American baseball player (born 1996)

Free agent
- Pitcher
- Born: January 16, 1996 (age 30); Petaluma, California, U.S.
- Bats: Right Throws: Right

MLB debut
- July 4, 2022, for the Detroit Tigers

MLB statistics (through 2023 season)
- Win–loss record: 3–3
- Earned run average: 5.09
- Strikeouts: 54
- Stats at Baseball Reference

Teams
- Detroit Tigers (2022–2023)

Garrett David Hill (born January 16, 1996) is an American professional baseball pitcher who is a free agent. He has previously played in Major League Baseball (MLB) for the Detroit Tigers.

== Career ==
Hill attended Analy High School in Sebastopol, California and played college baseball at Santa Rosa Junior College before finishing his collegiate career at San Diego State University.

=== Detroit Tigers ===
==== Minor leagues ====
Hill was drafted from San Diego State by the Detroit Tigers in the 26th round, with the 765th overall selection, of the 2018 Major League Baseball draft. He made his professional debut that year with the rookie-level Gulf Coast League Tigers.

Hill played 2019 with the Single-A West Michigan Whitecaps and High-A Lakeland Flying Tigers. He did not play in a game in 2020 due to the cancellation of the minor league season because of the COVID-19 pandemic. Hill returned to action in 2021 to pitch for West Michigan and the Double–A Erie SeaWolves. After the season, he played in the Arizona Fall League. Hill started the 2022 season with Erie.

==== Major leagues ====
On July 3, 2022, the Tigers selected Hill to the 40-man roster and promoted him to the major leagues for the first time. He started the first game of a doubleheader the next day, making his Major League debut against the Cleveland Guardians. Hill went six innings in this game, allowing one run on two hits while striking out three batters to earn his first MLB win. He became the first Tiger pitcher in team history to pitch at least six innings in his debut while allowing two or fewer hits. He made 17 appearances in his rookie campaign, registering a 3–3 record and 4.03 ERA with 40 strikeouts across 60 1/3 innings pitched.

In 9 games for Detroit in 2023, Hill struggled to a 9.19 ERA with 14 strikeouts in 15 2/3 innings of work. On November 17, 2023, the Tigers did not tender a contract to Hill, making him a free agent.

On November 21, 2023, Hill re–signed with the Tigers organization on a minor league contract. In 44 appearances split between Lakeland, Erie, and the Triple-A Toledo Mud Hens, he accumulated a 4–6 record and 4.79 ERA with 80 strikeouts across 67 2/3 innings pitched. Hill elected free agency following the season on November 4, 2024.

=== Seattle Mariners ===
On February 15, 2025, Hill signed a minor league contract with the Seattle Mariners. In 10 starts for the Double-A Arkansas Travelers, he logged a 1–3 record and 4.04 ERA with 37 strikeouts across 42 1/3 innings pitched. Hill was released by the Mariners organization on June 2.
