= 2021 Detroit Tigers season =

Major League Baseball season

2021 Detroit Tigers
- League: American League
- Division: Central
- Ballpark: Comerica Park
- City: Detroit, Michigan
- Record: 77–85 (.475)
- Divisional place: 3rd
- Owners: Christopher Ilitch; Ilitch family trust
- General managers: Al Avila
- Managers: A. J. Hinch
- Television: Bally Sports Detroit (Matt Shepard, Kirk Gibson, Jack Morris)
- Radio: Detroit Tigers Radio Network (Dan Dickerson, Jim Price)
- Stats: ESPN.com; Baseball Reference

The 2021 Detroit Tigers season was the team's 121st season and its 22nd at Comerica Park. This was the Tigers' first season under new manager A. J. Hinch following the sudden retirement of Ron Gardenhire on September 19, 2020. The Tigers' season began at home on April 1 against the Cleveland Indians. They sought to make the playoffs for the first time since 2014. On June 8, Comerica Park was allowed to return to operating at full seating capacity for the first time since 2019. The 2020 season was played behind closed doors due to the COVID-19 pandemic restrictions, and April and May games this year were limited to 8,000 fans.

The Tigers finished the season with a 77–85 record (third place in the AL Central division), and failed to make the playoffs for the seventh consecutive season. After beginning the season 9–24, the Tigers played over .500 the rest of the year (68–61).

== Roster moves ==
=== Coaching staff ===
- On October 30, the Tigers hired A. J. Hinch as the team's new manager. Hinch most recently held the same position for the Houston Astros but was suspended for the 2020 season due to a sign stealing scandal that occurred in 2017 and 2018, later leading to his dismissal.
- On November 6, the Tigers named Chris Fetter as pitching coach, and promoted Juan Nieves (previously pitching coach for the Triple-A Toledo Mud Hens) to assistant pitching coach for the MLB team. They also announced they would retain base coach Ramón Santiago and quality control coach Josh Paul from the 2020 staff.
- On November 7, the Tigers named George Lombard as bench coach, Scott Coolbaugh as hitting coach and Chip Hale as third base coach.
- On December 8, the Tigers named José Cruz Jr. assistant hitting coach.
- On June 12, 2021, the Tigers named Mike Hessman as assistant hitting coach, replacing José Cruz Jr. who accepted a position as head coach for Rice University.
- On July 16, 2021, the Tigers named Kimera Bartee first base coach, replacing third base coach Chip Hale who accepted a position as head coach at the University of Arizona. Current first base coach Ramon Santiago was moved to third base.

=== Releases ===
- On October 27, the Tigers outrighted four players from their 40-man roster: outfielder Jorge Bonifacio and pitchers Darío Agrazal, Dereck Rodríguez and Nick Ramirez. All cleared waivers without being claimed by another team. Rodríguez signed a minor-league contract with the Colorado Rockies on November 9, 2020. Ramirez elected to pursue free agency, and was signed to a minor-league contract by the San Diego Padres on December 21, 2020. The remaining two became minor-league free agents.
- On October 28, the following Tigers players declared free agency: catcher Austin Romine, infielders Jonathan Schoop and C. J. Cron, and pitchers Jordan Zimmermann, Iván Nova and Sandy Báez. On January 23, Romine signed a one-year, $1.5 million contract with the Chicago Cubs. On January 26, Nova signed a minor-league contract with the Philadelphia Phillies. On February 15, Cron signed a minor-league contract with the Colorado Rockies organization. On February 18, Zimmermann signed a minor-league contract with the Milwaukee Brewers organization.
- On November 19, the Tigers released outfielder/first baseman Brandon Dixon, who announced his intention to play in Nippon Professional Baseball. Dixon cleared waivers on November 21.
- On December 7, pitcher Anthony Castro was claimed off waivers by the Toronto Blue Jays.
- On December 23, catcher Eric Haase was designated for assignment. He was out-righted on January 6, 2021.
- On January 5, outfielder Troy Stokes Jr. was designated for assignment. On January 12, he was claimed off waivers by the Pittsburgh Pirates and was again designated for assignment two weeks later. He cleared waivers and was outrighted to the Triple-A Indianapolis Indians.
- On January 29, infielder Sergio Alcántara was designated for assignment. On February 5, he was claimed off waivers by the Chicago Cubs.
- On February 5, outfielder Travis Demeritte was designated for assignment. On February 12, he was claimed off waivers by the Atlanta Braves.
- On February 12, pitcher John Schreiber was designated for assignment. On February 18, he was claimed off waivers by the Boston Red Sox.
- On March 26, infielder Greg Garcia was granted his release by the Tigers after exercising an opt-out clause in his contract. On April 22, Garcia signed a minor league contract with the Philadelphia Phillies.
- On June 15, pitcher Beau Burrows and catcher Wilson Ramos were designated for assignment. On June 20, Ramos was released. On June 22, Burrows was claimed off waivers by the Minnesota Twins. On July 6, Ramos signed a minor-league contract with the Cleveland Indians.
- On July 16, outfielder Nomar Mazara was designated for assignment. Mazara was released on July 21. On December 21, Mazara signed a minor league contract with the San Diego Padres with an invitation to spring training.
- On August 14, pitcher Buck Farmer was designated for assignment. He was released on August 17. On August 21, Farmer signed a minor league contract with the Texas Rangers.
- On August 27, pitcher Erasmo Ramírez was designated for assignment. He was released the next day. On March 13, 2022, Ramírez signed a minor league contract with the Washington Nationals with an invitation to spring training.

=== Signings ===
- On November 20, the Tigers purchased the minor-league contracts of pitchers Joey Wentz, Matt Manning, Alex Lange and Alex Faedo, adding them to the 40-man roster.
- On December 10, the Tigers claimed outfielder Akil Baddoo from the Minnesota Twins organization in the Rule 5 draft.
- On December 14, the Tigers signed pitcher Ian Krol to a minor-league contract, with an invitation to spring training.
- On December 23, the Tigers signed catcher Dustin Garneau to a minor-league contract, with an invitation to spring training. Garneau was released from his minor-league contract on July 15. He was then signed by the Colorado Rockies to a minor-league contract on July 22. He was traded back to the Tigers and added to the active roster on August 18.
- On December 23, the Tigers signed pitcher José Ureña to a one-year, $3.25 million contract.
- On January 4, the Tigers signed pitcher Locke St. John to a minor-league contract.
- On January 5, the Tigers signed outfielder Robbie Grossman to a two-year, $10 million contract.
- On January 7, the Tigers signed pitcher Miguel Del Pozo to a minor-league contract.
- On January 12, the Tigers signed pitcher Michael Fulmer to a one-year, $3.1 million contract, avoiding arbitration.
- On January 15, the Tigers agreed to one-year contracts with all remaining arbitration-eligible players, including infielders Jeimer Candelario and Niko Goodrum, outfielder JaCoby Jones, and pitchers Joe Jiménez, Buck Farmer, Matthew Boyd, Daniel Norris and José Cisnero.
- On January 15, the Tigers signed international shortstops Cristian Santana to a $2.975 million contract and Abel Bastidas to a $1.175 million contract. The Tigers also signed outfielders Carlos Pelegrin and Elian Riera, pitchers Joel Baez, Rayner Castillo, and Keni Salgado, and shortstops Jensy De Leon, Yimmy Diaz and Justin Rodriguez.
- On January 16, the Tigers signed pitchers Robbie Ross Jr. and Andrew Moore, first baseman Aderlin Rodríguez and infielder Yariel Gonzalez to minor-league contracts.
- On January 19, the Tigers signed pitcher Erasmo Ramírez to a minor-league contract, with an invitation to spring training.
- On January 29, the Tigers signed catcher Wilson Ramos to a one-year, $2 million contract.
- On February 1, the Tigers signed pitcher Derek Holland to a minor-league contract, with an invitation to spring training.
- On February 5, the Tigers re-signed second baseman Jonathan Schoop to a one-year, $4.5 million contract. On August 7, the Tigers signed Schoop to a two-year, $15 million contract extension for 2022 and 2023, with a clause allowing an opt-out after 2022.
- On February 9, the Tigers signed infielder Greg Garcia to a minor-league contract, with an invitation to spring training.
- On February 10, the Tigers signed first baseman Renato Núñez to a minor-league contract, with an invitation to spring training.
- On February 12, the Tigers signed outfielder Nomar Mazara to a one-year contract worth $1.75 million plus incentives.
- On February 19, the Tigers signed pitcher Julio Teherán to a minor-league contract with an invitation to spring training. On March 22, Teherán opted out of his minor-league deal. On March 24, Teherán was selected to the 40-man roster and signed to a one-year $3 million contract, plus a $1 million bonus if he starts 20 major league games.
- On February 28, the Tigers signed pitcher Drew Hutchison to a minor-league contract.
- On August 2, the Tigers claimed pitcher Nivaldo Rodríguez off waivers from the Houston Astros.

=== Trades ===
- On July 30, the Tigers traded pitcher Daniel Norris to the Milwaukee Brewers in exchange for minor-league pitching prospect Reese Olson.
- On August 18, the Tigers acquired catcher Dustin Garneau from the Colorado Rockies in exchange for cash considerations.

== Season standings ==
=== American League Central ===
AL Central
Team	W	L	Pct.	GB	Home	Road
Chicago White Sox	93	69	.574	—	53‍–‍28	40‍–‍41
Cleveland Indians	80	82	.494	13	40‍–‍41	40‍–‍41
Detroit Tigers	77	85	.475	16	42‍–‍39	35‍–‍46
Kansas City Royals	74	88	.457	19	39‍–‍42	35‍–‍46
Minnesota Twins	73	89	.451	20	38‍–‍43	35‍–‍46

=== Record against opponents ===
2021 American League record Source: MLB Standings Grid – 2021
Team	BAL	BOS	CWS	CLE	DET	HOU	KC	LAA	MIN	NYY	OAK	SEA	TB	TEX	TOR	NL
Baltimore	—	6–13	0–7	2–5	2–5	3–3	4–3	2–4	2–4	8–11	3–3	3–4	1–18	4–3	5–14	7–13
Boston	13–6	—	3–4	4–2	3–3	2–5	5–2	3–3	5–2	10–9	3–3	4–3	8–11	3–4	10–9	16–4
Chicago	7–0	4–3	—	10–9	12–7	2–5	9–10	2–5	13–6	1–5	4–3	3–3	3–3	5–1	4–3	14–6
Cleveland	5–2	2–4	9–10	—	12–7	1–6	14–5	5–1	8–11	3–4	2–4	3–4	1–6	4–2	2–5	9–11
Detroit	5–2	3–3	7–12	7–12	—	5–2	8–11	1–6	8–11	3–3	1–6	5–1	4–3	6–1	3–3	11–9
Houston	3–3	5–2	5–2	6–1	2–5	—	3–4	13–6	3–4	2–4	11–8	11–8	4–2	14–5	4–2	9–11
Kansas City	3–4	2–5	10–9	5–14	11–8	4–3	—	2–4	10–9	2–4	2–5	4–3	2–4	2–4	3–4	12–8
Los Angeles	4–2	3–3	5–2	1–5	6–1	6–13	4–2	—	5–2	4–3	4–15	8–11	1–6	11–8	4–3	11–9
Minnesota	4–2	2–5	6–13	11–8	11–8	4–3	9–10	2–5	—	1–6	1–5	2–4	3–3	4–3	3–4	10–10
New York	11–8	9–10	5–1	4–3	3–3	4–2	4–2	3–4	6–1	—	4–3	5–2	8–11	6–1	8–11	12–8
Oakland	3–3	3–3	3–4	4–2	6–1	8–11	5–2	15–4	5–1	3–4	—	4–15	4–3	10–9	2–5	11–9
Seattle	4–3	3–4	3–3	4–3	1–5	8–11	3–4	11–8	4–2	2–5	15–4	—	6–1	13–6	4–2	9–11
Tampa Bay	18–1	11–8	3–3	6–1	3–4	2–4	4–2	6–1	3–3	11–8	3–4	1–6	—	3–4	11–8	15–5
Texas	3–4	4–3	1–5	2–4	1–6	5–14	4–2	8–11	3–4	1–6	9–10	6–13	4–3	—	2–4	7–13
Toronto	14–5	9–10	3–4	5–2	3–3	2–4	4–3	3–4	4–3	11–8	5–2	2–4	8–11	4–2	—	14–6

Updated with the results of all games through October 3, 2021.

=== American League Wild Card ===
Division leaders
Team	W	L	Pct.
Tampa Bay Rays	100	62	.617
Houston Astros	95	67	.586
Chicago White Sox	93	69	.574

Wild Card teams (Top 2 teams qualify for postseason)
Team	W	L	Pct.	GB
Boston Red Sox	92	70	.568	—
New York Yankees	92	70	.568	—
Toronto Blue Jays	91	71	.562	1
Seattle Mariners	90	72	.556	2
Oakland Athletics	86	76	.531	6
Cleveland Indians	80	82	.494	12
Los Angeles Angels	77	85	.475	15
Detroit Tigers	77	85	.475	15
Kansas City Royals	74	88	.457	18
Minnesota Twins	73	89	.451	19
Texas Rangers	60	102	.370	32
Baltimore Orioles	52	110	.321	40

== Season highlights ==
=== Individual accomplishments ===
==== Hitting ====
- On April 1, Miguel Cabrera became the second Tigers player to record 350 home runs and 2,000 hits with the team, following Al Kaline.
- On April 4, Akil Baddoo hit a home run on the first pitch he faced as a major league player, off Aaron Civale of the Cleveland Indians. Baddoo became the ninth player in franchise history to homer in his first major league at-bat, and only the second player to do so on the first pitch, following George Vico who accomplished the feat on April 20, 1948.
- On April 5, Akil Baddoo hit his first career grand slam against Randy Dobnak of the Minnesota Twins. He became the first player in franchise history to hit a home run in his first two career games and the first player in MLB history to do so from the ninth spot in the batting order.
- On April 6, Akil Baddoo hit his first career walk-off hit, an RBI single off of Minnesota Twins' closer Hansel Robles. He became the first Tigers player with a walk-off hit within his first three major league games since Gabe Alvarez singled off Cubs reliever Dave Stevens on June 24, 1998. Baddoo is the first MLB player since at least 1900 with two homers, including a grand slam, and a walk-off hit in his first three games.
- On April 13, Akil Baddoo recorded his fourth home run of the season. He became the first player in franchise history to post four homers and 10 RBIs within his first eight games, and the first major league player to do so since Kyle Lewis in 2019. He also became the first Tigers player, and one of six players in MLB history, to drive in a run in at least six of his first eight career games since Don Ross in 1931.
- On June 1, Miguel Cabrera recorded his 400th career double with the Tigers, becoming the eighth player in franchise history to reach the milestone.
- Also on June 1, Jonathan Schoop and Eric Haase became the first Tigers teammates with multiple home runs in the same game since September 2017.
- On July 27, opposing catchers (Mitch Garver of the Minnesota Twins and Eric Haase of the Tigers) hit grand slams in the same game for the first time in major league history.
- On August 2, Eric Haase was named American League Rookie of the Month for July. He became the first Tiger to win the award since Brennan Boesch in 2010. In July, Haase posted a .265 average and a .627 slugging percentage, with nine home runs and 29 RBI.
- On August 22, Miguel Cabrera recorded his 500th career home run, becoming the 28th player in MLB history to reach the milestone, and the first player to do so as a Tiger.
- On August 27, Víctor Reyes hit a pinch-hit inside-the-park home run, becoming the first MLB player to do so since Tyler Saladino on May 14, 2018, and the first Tigers player to do since Ben Oglivie on June 2, 1976.
- On September 7 against the Pittsburgh Pirates, Miguel Cabrera passed Ichiro Suzuki to become the all-time MLB leader with 369 career hits in interleague play. Cabrera had two more hits in that game, then went 4-for-4 against the Pirates the next night, increasing his interleague hit total to 375.
- Over a three-game stretch from September 7 to 10, Cabrera had a hit in nine consecutive plate appearances before making an out. This marks the longest streak by a Tiger since Walt Dropo tied a major league record with hits in 12 straight plate appearances in 1952, and the longest streak by any major league player age 38 or older since Ty Cobb in 1925.
- On September 20, Miguel Cabrera recorded his 1,800th career RBI, becoming the 20th player in MLB history to reach the milestone.

==== Pitching ====
- On May 18, Spencer Turnbull pitched the eighth no-hitter in Tigers history against the Seattle Mariners. Turnbull became the sixth Tigers pitcher to throw a no-hitter and the first since Justin Verlander on May 7, 2011.
- On June 12, the Tigers used two position players (Jake Rogers and Harold Castro) as pitchers for the first time in over 100 years in a 15–2 loss to the Chicago White Sox. The last time two position players pitched in the same game for the Tigers was September 2, 1918, when Ty Cobb and Bobby Veach both took the mound.
- On July 3, Tarik Skubal became the first Tiger rookie in franchise history to strike out 100 batters before the All-Star break.

=== Team accomplishments ===
- On May 28–30, the Tigers swept the Yankees in Detroit for the first time since May 12–14, 2000.
- On June 30, the Tigers swept a doubleheader in Cleveland against the Indians for the first time since September 14, 1977.
- On July 28, the Tigers scored 17 runs in a game without a home run for the first time since 1961, defeating the Minnesota Twins 17–14. This also marked the first time in MLB history since 1900 that a team allowed seven home runs in a game, went homerless, and still won the game. All nine players who batted for the Tigers had a hit, run and RBI, marking the first time this has been accomplished since the California Angels in 1978.
- On August 7, the Tigers defeated the Indians in Cleveland, 2–1, marking the first time the team won a road game in Cleveland when scoring two runs or fewer since September 14, 1977.

== Game log ==
2021 Game Log: 77–85 (Home: 42–39; Away: 35–46)
April: 8–19 (Home: 4–9; Away: 4–10)

#	Date	Opponent	Score	Win	Loss	Save	Attendance	Record	Streak
1	April 1	Indians	3–2	**Boyd** (1–0)	Bieber (0–1)	**Soto** (1)	8,000	1–0	W1
2	April 3	Indians	5–2	**Teherán** (1–0)	Plesac (0–1)	**Garcia** (1)	8,000	2–0	W2
3	April 4	Indians	3–9	Civale (1–0)	**Norris** (0–1)	—	8,000	2–1	L1
4	April 5	Twins	6–15	Shoemaker (1–0)	**Ureña** (0–1)	Dobnak (1)	7,232	2–2	L2
5	April 6	Twins	4–3 (10)	**Soto** (1–0)	Robles (0–1)	—	7,306	3–2	W1
6	April 7	Twins	2–3	Maeda (1–0)	**Boyd** (1–1)	Colomé (2)	7,568	3–3	L1
7	April 9	@ Indians	1–4	Plesac (1–1)	**Holland** (0–1)	Clase (1)	7,775	3–4	L2
8	April 10	@ Indians	3–11	Civale (2–0)	**Skubal** (0–1)	—	7,570	3–5	L3
9	April 11	@ Indians	2–5	Allen (1–1)	**Ureña** (0–2)	Clase (2)	6,859	3–6	L4
10	April 12	@ Astros	6–2	**Mize** (1–0)	Greinke (1–1)	—	15,779	4–6	W1
11	April 13	@ Astros	8–2	**Boyd** (2–1)	Odorizzi (0–1)	—	17,080	5–6	W2
12	April 14	@ Astros	6–4	**Fulmer** (1–0)	McCullers Jr. (1–1)	**Garcia** (2)	14,720	6–6	W3
13	April 15	@ Athletics	4–8	Manaea (1–1)	**Skubal** (0–2)	—	3,004	6–7	L1
14	April 16	@ Athletics	0–3	Montas (2–1)	**Ureña** (0–3)	Trivino (2)	4,538	6–8	L2
15	April 17	@ Athletics	0–7	Irvin (1–2)	**Mize** (1–1)	—	6,931	6–9	L3
16	April 18	@ Athletics	2–3	Trivino (1–0)	**Soto** (1–1)	—	6,917	6–10	L4
—	April 20	Pirates	Postponed (inclement weather). Rescheduled to April 21.						
17	April 21	Pirates	2–3 (7)	Anderson (2–2)	**Fulmer** (1–1)	Rodríguez (2)	7,356	6–11	L5
18	April 21	Pirates	5–2 (7)	**Turnbull** (1–0)	Yajure (0–1)	**Soto** (2)	7,461	7–11	W1
19	April 22	Pirates	2–4	Howard (2–1)	**Cisnero** (0–1)	Rodríguez (3)	7,314	7–12	L1
20	April 23	Royals	2–6	Minor (2–1)	**Mize** (1–2)	—	8,000	7–13	L2
21	April 24	Royals	1–2	Singer (1–2)	**Boyd** (2–2)	Staumont (1)	8,000	7–14	L3
22	April 25	Royals	0–4	Duffy (3–1)	**Skubal** (0–3)	—	8,000	7–15	L4
23	April 26	Royals	2–3	Keller (2–2)	**Turnbull** (1–1)	Staumont (2)	7,288	7–16	L5
24	April 27	@ White Sox	5–2	**Ureña** (1–3)	Giolito (2–2)	**Soto** (3)	9,445	8–16	W1
—	April 28	@ White Sox	Postponed (inclement weather). Rescheduled to April 29.						
25	April 29	@ White Sox	1–3 (7)	Rodón (4–0)	**Mize** (1–3)	Hendriks (5)	7,628	8–17	L1
26	April 29	@ White Sox	0–11 (7)	Cease (1–0)	**Boyd** (2–3)	—	7,628	8–18	L2
27	April 30	@ Yankees	0–10	Cole (4–1)	**Skubal** (0–4)	—	9,523	8–19	L3

May: 14–13 (Home: 9–6; Away: 5–7)

#	Date	Opponent	Score	Win	74-79	Save	Attendance	Record	Streak
28	May 1	@ Yankees	4–6	Taillon (1–2)	**Turnbull** (1–2)	Chapman (5)	10,015	8–20	L4
29	May 2	@ Yankees	0–2	Kluber (2–2)	**Ureña** (1–4)	Chapman (6)	10,021	8–21	L5
30	May 4	@ Red Sox	7–11	Pivetta (4–0)	**Fulmer** (1–2)	Barnes (7)	4,677	8–22	L6
31	May 5	@ Red Sox	6–5 (10)	**Soto** (2–1)	Whitlock (0–1)	**Fulmer** (1)	4,661	9–22	W1
32	May 6	@ Red Sox	9–12	Andriese (1–1)	**Lange** (0–1)	Ottavino (1)	4,734	9–23	L1
33	May 7	Twins	3–7	Shoemaker (2–3)	**Skubal** (0–5)	—	7,377	9–24	L2
34	May 8	Twins	7–3	**Fulmer** (2–2)	Duffey (0–2)	—	8,000	10–24	W1
—	May 9	Twins	Postponed (inclement weather). Rescheduled to July 16.						
35	May 11	Royals	8–7	**Soto** (3–1)	Barlow (1–1)	—	7,312	11–24	W2
36	May 12	Royals	4–2	**Mize** (2–3)	Duffy (4–3)	**Soto** (4)	7,133	12–24	W3
37	May 13	Royals	4–3	**Turnbull** (2–2)	Lynch (0–2)	**Fulmer** (2)	7,369	13–24	W4
38	May 14	Cubs	2–4	Arrieta (4–3)	**Skubal** (0–6)	Kimbrel (7)	8,000	13–25	L1
39	May 15	Cubs	9–8 (10)	**Fulmer** (3–2)	Kimbrel (0–2)	—	8,000	14–25	W1
40	May 16	Cubs	1–5	Hendricks (3–4)	**Boyd** (2–4)	—	8,000	14–26	L1
41	May 17	@ Mariners	4–1	**Mize** (3–3)	Kikuchi (1–3)	**Fulmer** (3)	7,201	15–26	W1
42	May 18	@ Mariners	5–0	**Turnbull** (3–2)	Dunn (1–2)	—	8,883	16–26	W2
43	May 19	@ Mariners	6–2	**Skubal** (1–6)	Gilbert (0–2)	—	8,462	17–26	W3
44	May 21	@ Royals	7–5	**Ureña** (2–4)	Zuber (0–1)	**Fulmer** (4)	17,080	18–26	W4
45	May 22	@ Royals	5–7	Singer (2–3)	**Boyd** (2–5)	—	14,226	18–27	L1
46	May 23	@ Royals	2–3	Zimmer (3–0)	**Fulmer** (3–3)	—	15,540	18–28	L2
47	May 24	Indians	5–6	Mejía (1–0)	**Garcia** (0–1)	Clase (8)	7,832	18–29	L3
48	May 25	Indians	1–4	Civale (7–1)	**Skubal** (1–7)	Karinchak (6)	8,000	18–30	L4
49	May 26	Indians	1–0	**Fulmer** (4–3)	Quantrill (0–1)	**Soto** (5)	7,525	19–30	W1
50	May 27	Indians	2–5	Bieber (5–3)	**Boyd** (2–6)	—	8,000	19–31	L1
51	May 28	Yankees	3–2 (10)	**Garcia** (1–1)	Wilson (1–1)	—	8,000	20–31	W1
52	May 29	Yankees	6–1	**Turnbull** (4–2)	García (0–2)	—	8,000	21–31	W2
53	May 30	Yankees	6–2	**Skubal** (2–7)	King (0–2)	—	8,000	22–31	W3
54	May 31	@ Brewers	2–3 (10)	Boxberger (2–1)	**Cisnero** (0–2)	—	23,917	22–32	L1

June: 14–13 (Home: 6–6; Away: 8–7)

#	Date	Opponent	Score	Win	Loss	Save	Attendance	Record	Streak
55	June 1	@ Brewers	10–7	**Holland** (1–1)	Lauer (1–2)	—	12,058	23–32	W1
56	June 3	@ White Sox	1–4	Lynn (7–1)	**Mize** (3–4)	Hendriks (14)	12,845	23–33	L1
57	June 4	@ White Sox	8–9	Hendriks (2–1)	**Cisnero** (0–3)	—	21,637	23–34	L2
58	June 5	@ White Sox	4–3	**Skubal** (3–7)	Giolito (5–5)	**Cisnero** (1)	21,719	24–34	W1
59	June 6	@ White Sox	0–3	Cease (4–2)	**Ureña** (2–5)	Hendriks (15)	20,068	24–35	L1
60	June 8	Mariners	5–3	**Boyd** (3–6)	Gonzales (1–4)	**Cisnero** (2)	9,081	25–35	W1
61	June 9	Mariners	6–9 (11)	Chargois (1–0)	**Norris** (0–2)	—	9,162	25–36	L1
62	June 10	Mariners	8–3	**Jiménez** (1–0)	Sheffield (5–5)	—	9,290	26–36	W1
63	June 11	White Sox	4–5 (10)	Hendriks (3–1)	**Cisnero** (0–4)	Bummer (2)	14,163	26–37	L1
64	June 12	White Sox	2–15	Cease (5–2)	**Ureña** (2–6)	—	15,913	26–38	L2
65	June 13	White Sox	1–4	Rodón (6–2)	**Alexander** (0–1)	Hendriks (17)	14,093	26–39	L3
66	June 14	@ Royals	10–3	**Jiménez** (2–0)	Keller (6–6)	—	11,910	27–39	W1
67	June 15	@ Royals	4–3	**Mize** (4–4)	Minor (5–4)	**Soto** (6)	15,947	28–39	W2
68	June 16	@ Royals	6–5	**Skubal** (4–7)	Holland (2–2)	**Fulmer** (5)	11,327	29–39	W3
69	June 17	@ Angels	5–7	Ohtani (3–1)	**Manning** (0–1)	Iglesias (12)	30,709	29–40	L1
70	June 18	@ Angels	3–11	Cobb (5–2)	**Ureña** (2–7)	—	22,734	29–41	L2
71	June 19	@ Angels	3–8	Sandoval (2–2)	**Peralta** (0–1)	—	23,175	29–42	L3
72	June 20	@ Angels	5–3 (10)	**Cisnero** (1–4)	Iglesias (4–3)	**Fulmer** (6)	21,626	30–42	W1
73	June 22	Cardinals	8–2	**Funkhouser** (1–0)	Oviedo (0–3)	—	13,492	31–42	W2
74	June 23	Cardinals	6–2	**Manning** (1–1)	Gant (4–6)	—	13,263	32–42	W3
75	June 24	Astros	3–12	García (6–4)	**Ureña** (2–8)	—	12,656	32–43	L1
—	June 25	Astros	Postponed (inclement weather). Rescheduled to June 26.						
76	June 26	Astros	3–1 (7)	**Mize** (5–4)	Valdez (4–1)	**Cisnero** (3)	12,422	33–43	W1
77	June 26	Astros	2–3 (7)	McCullers Jr. (5–1)	**Fulmer** (4–4)	Pressly (12)	13,950	33–44	L1
78	June 27	Astros	2–1 (10)	**Soto** (4–1)	Taylor (0–2)	—	13,532	34–44	W1
79	June 28	@ Indians	5–13	Morgan (1–2)	**Manning** (1–2)	—	13,128	34–45	L1
—	June 29	@ Indians	Postponed (inclement weather). Rescheduled to June 30.						
80	June 30	@ Indians	9–4 (7)	**Funkhouser** (2–0)	Shaw (2–3)	—	11,627	35–45	W1
81	June 30	@ Indians	7–1 (7)	**Peralta** (1–1)	Allen (1–5)	—	11,627	36–45	W2

July: 14–12 (Home: 10–3; Away: 4–9)

#	Date	Opponent	Score	Win	Loss	Save	Attendance	Record	Streak
82	July 2	White Sox	2–8	Lynn (8–3)	**Mize** (5–5)	—	18,185	36–46	L1
83	July 3	White Sox	11–5	**Skubal** (5–7)	Keuchel (6–3)	—	17,230	37–46	W1
84	July 4	White Sox	6–5	**Alexander** (1–1)	Giolito (6–6)	**Cisnero** (4)	15,342	38–46	W2
85	July 5	@ Rangers	7–3	**Peralta** (2–1)	Allard (2–5)	—	34,484	39–46	W3
86	July 6	@ Rangers	5–10	King (7–5)	**Norris** (0–3)	—	24,367	39–47	L1
87	July 7	@ Rangers	5–3	**Funkhouser** (3–0)	Gibson (6–1)	**Soto** (7)	33,043	40–47	W1
88	July 8	@ Twins	3–5	Happ (5–4)	**Skubal** (5–8)	Rogers (8)	18,192	40–48	L1
89	July 9	@ Twins	2–4	Alcalá (2–3)	**Manning** (1–3)	Robles (9)	21,725	40–49	L2
90	July 10	@ Twins	4–9	Coulombe (1–0)	**Jiménez** (2–1)	—	21,030	40–50	L3
91	July 11	@ Twins	9–12 (10)	Duffey (1–2)	**Holland** (1–2)	—	20,744	40–51	L4
**2021 Major League Baseball All-Star Game**
—	July 16	Twins	Postponed (inclement weather). Rescheduled to July 17.						
—	July 16	Twins	Postponed (inclement weather). Rescheduled to August 30.						
92	July 17	Twins	1–0 (7)	**Norris** (1–3)	Barnes (0–1)	**Soto** (8)	13,747	41–51	W1
93	July 17	Twins	5–4 (8)	**Jiménez** (3–1)	Rogers (2–4)	—	31,624	42–51	W2
94	July 18	Twins	7–0	**Peralta** (3–1)	Happ (5–5)	—	15,854	43–51	W3
95	July 19	Rangers	14–0	**Jiménez** (4–1)	Gibson (6–2)	—	13,704	44–51	W4
96	July 20	Rangers	4–1	**Skubal** (6–8)	Dunning (3–7)	**Soto** (9)	13,333	45–51	W5
97	July 21	Rangers	4–2	**Manning** (2–3)	Lyles (5–7)	**Soto** (10)	21,132	46–51	W6
98	July 22	Rangers	7–5	**Funkhouser** (4–0)	Foltynewicz (2–10)	**Soto** (11)	16,033	47–51	W7
99	July 23	@ Royals	3–5	Bubic (3–4)	**Peralta** (3–2)	Holland (7)	24,912	47–52	L1
100	July 24	@ Royals	8–9	Brentz (3–2)	**Funkhouser** (4–1)	Davis (2)	24,616	47–53	L2
101	July 25	@ Royals	1–6	Lynch (1–2)	**Skubal** (6–9)	—	12,703	47–54	L3
102	July 26	@ Twins	5–6 (10)	Thielbar (3–0)	**Soto** (4–2)	—	17,713	47–55	L4
103	July 27	@ Twins	6–5 (11)	**Cisnero** (2–4)	Alcalá (2–5)	**Norris** (1)	17,643	48–55	W1
104	July 28	@ Twins	17–14	**Holland** (2–2)	Happ (5–6)	—	17,817	49–55	W2
105	July 29	Orioles	6–2	**Mize** (6–5)	Wells (1–1)	—	15,833	50–55	W3
106	July 30	Orioles	3–4	Harvey (6–10)	**Skubal** (6–10)	Sulser (4)	18,861	50–56	L1
107	July 31	Orioles	2–5	Means (5–3)	**Manning** (2–4)	Sulser (5)	25,132	50–57	L2

August: 12–14 (Home: 5–10; Away: 7–4)

#	Date	Opponent	Score	Win	Loss	Save	Attendance	Record	Streak
108	August 1	Orioles	6–2	**Ramírez** (1–0)	Watkins (2–2)	—	17,134	51–57	W1
109	August 3	Red Sox	4–2	**Funkhouser** (5–1)	Richards (6–7)	**Soto** (12)	15,724	52–57	W2
110	August 4	Red Sox	1–4	Rodríguez (8–6)	**Mize** (6–6)	Barnes (24)	16,633	52–58	L1
111	August 5	Red Sox	8–1	**Skubal** (7–10)	Pérez (7–8)	—	19,144	53–58	W1
112	August 6	@ Indians	1–6	Quantrill (3–2)	**Manning** (2–5)	Clase (15)	24,485	53–59	L1
113	August 7	@ Indians	2–1	**Alexander** (2–1)	Morgan (1–4)	**Soto** (13)	24,560	54–59	W1
114	August 8	@ Indians	5–7	Shaw (5–5)	**Ramírez** (1–1)	Clase (16)	19,899	54–60	L1
115	August 10	@ Orioles	9–4	**Funkhouser** (6–1)	Akin (0–6)	—	7,124	55–60	W1
116	August 11	@ Orioles	5–2	**Skubal** (8–10)	Harvey (6–11)	**Soto** (14)	8,990	56–60	W2
117	August 12	@ Orioles	6–4	**Manning** (3–5)	Means (5–4)	**Fulmer** (7)	8,382	57–60	W3
118	August 13	Indians	4–7	Plesac (7–4)	**Alexander** (2–2)	—	22,107	57–61	L1
119	August 14	Indians	6–4	**Fulmer** (5–4)	Shaw (5–6)	**Soto** (15)	32,845	58–61	W1
120	August 15	Indians	0–11	McKenzie (2–5)	**Hutchison** (0–1)	—	25,684	58–62	L1
121	August 17	Angels	2–8	Mayers (3–4)	**Soto** (4–3)	—	24,714	58–63	L2
122	August 18	Angels	1–3	Ohtani (8–1)	**Skubal** (8–11)	Iglesias (27)	27,284	58–64	L3
123	August 19	Angels	10–13	Mayers (4–4)	**Fulmer** (5–5)	Warren (1)	20,847	58–65	L4
124	August 20	@ Blue Jays	4–1 (10)	**Soto** (5–3)	Richards (5–2)	—	14,649	59–65	W1
125	August 21	@ Blue Jays	0–3	Ryu (12–6)	**Peralta** (3–3)	Romano (11)	14,887	59–66	L1
126	August 22	@ Blue Jays	5–3 (11)	**Soto** (6–3)	Snead (0–1)	**Jiménez** (1)	14,865	60–66	W1
127	August 24	@ Cardinals	4–3	**Mize** (7–6)	Flaherty (9–2)	**Fulmer** (8)	28,185	61–66	W2
128	August 25	@ Cardinals	2–3 (10)	McFarland (3–0)	**Fulmer** (5–6)	—	24,304	61–67	L1
129	August 27	Blue Jays	2–1	**Cisnero** (3–4)	Mayza (4–2)	**Soto** (16)	17,259	62–67	W1
130	August 28	Blue Jays	2–3 (10)	Romano (6–1)	**Funkhouser** (6–2)	—	18,783	62–68	L1
131	August 29	Blue Jays	1–2	Berríos (9–7)	**Boyd** (3–7)	Mayza (1)	15,926	62–69	L2
132	August 30	Twins	2–3	Ober (2–2)	**Mize** (7–7)	Colomé (10)	13,425	62–70	L3
133	August 31	Athletics	3–9	Guerra (3–1)	**Skubal** (8–12)	—	13,853	62–71	L4

September: 14–12 (Home: 8–5; Away: 6–7)

#	Date	Opponent	Score	Win	Loss	Save	Attendance	Record	Streak
134	September 1	Athletics	8–6	**Jiménez** (5–1)	Puk (0–2)	**Soto** (17)	12,593	63–71	W1
135	September 2	Athletics	6–8	Montas (11–9)	**Manning** (3–6)	Romo (2)	11,623	63–72	L1
136	September 3	@ Reds	15–5	**Holland** (3–2)	Gutiérrez (9–6)	—	19,430	64–72	W1
137	September 4	@ Reds	4–7	Mahle (11–5)	**Boyd** (3–8)	Givens (5)	26,962	64–73	L1
138	September 5	@ Reds	4–1	**Ureña** (3–8)	Castillo (7–15)	**Soto** (18)	23,083	65–73	W1
139	September 6	@ Pirates	3–6	Shreve (3–1)	**Funkhouser** (6–3)	Bednar (3)	11,141	65–74	L1
140	September 7	@ Pirates	2–3	Howard (3–4)	**Lange** (0–2)	Stratton (3)	8,329	65–75	L2
141	September 8	@ Pirates	5–1	**Hutchison** (1–1)	Keller (4–11)	—	8,382	66–75	W1
142	September 10	Rays	10–4	**Cisnero** (4–4)	Fairbanks (3–6)	—	18,321	67–75	W2
143	September 11	Rays	2–7	Enns (1–0)	**Mize** (7–8)	—	18,842	67–76	L1
144	September 12	Rays	8–7 (10)	**Funkhouser** (7–3)	Feyereisen (4–4)	—	13,396	68–76	W1
145	September 14	Brewers	1–0 (11)	**Garcia** (2–1)	Strickland (3–2)	—	12,433	69–76	W2
146	September 15	Brewers	4–1	**Manning** (4–6)	Woodruff (9–9)	**Fulmer** (9)	11,321	70–76	W3
147	September 16	@ Rays	2–5	Enns (2–0)	**Alexander** (2–3)	—	10,206	70–77	L1
148	September 17	@ Rays	4–7 (10)	Kittredge (9–3)	**Garcia** (2–2)	—	16,451	70–78	L2
149	September 18	@ Rays	4–3	**Ureña** (4–8)	Yarbrough (8–6)	**Fulmer** (10)	22,921	71–78	W1
150	September 19	@ Rays	2–0	**Peralta** (4–3)	McClanahan (9–6)	**Funkhouser** (1)	17,948	72–78	W2
151	September 20	White Sox	4–3	**Hutchison** (2–1)	Kimbrel (4–5)	**Lange** (1)	12,884	73–78	W3
152	September 21	White Sox	5–3	**Garcia** (3–2)	Fry (0–1)	**Fulmer** (11)	10,585	74–78	W4
—	September 22	White Sox	Postponed (inclement weather). Rescheduled to September 27.						
153	September 24	Royals	1–3	Tapia (4–0)	**Lange** (0–3)	Barlow (15)	24,877	74–79	L1
154	September 25	Royals	5–1	**Hutchison** (3–1)	Tapia (4–1)	**Fulmer** (12)	16,424	75–79	W1
155	September 26	Royals	1–2	Bubic (6–6)	**Peralta** (4–4)	Barlow (16)	23,788	75–80	L1
156	September 27	White Sox	7–8	Keuchel (9–9)	**Manning** (4–7)	Hendriks (37)	11,044	75–81	L2
157	September 28	@ Twins	2–3	Thielbar (7–0)	**Alexander** (2–4)	Colomé (17)	16,329	75–82	L3
158	September 29	@ Twins	2–5	Pineda (9–8)	**Mize** (7–9)	—	17,254	75–83	L4
159	September 30	@ Twins	10–7	**Lange** (1–3)	Garza Jr. (1–4)	**Fulmer** (13)	21,186	76–83	W1

October: 1–2 (Home: 0–0; Away: 1–2)

#	Date	Opponent	Score	Win	Loss	Save	Attendance	Record	Streak
160	October 1	@ White Sox	1–8	Lynn (11–6)	**Peralta** (4–5)	—	30,729	76–84	L1
161	October 2	@ White Sox	4–5	Bummer (5–5)	**Funkhouser** (7–4)	Hendriks (38)	36,320	76–85	L2
162	October 3	@ White Sox	5–2	**Jiménez** (6–1)	López (4–4)	—	30,722	77–85	W1

Legend: = Win = Loss = Postponement
Bold = Tigers team member

== Roster ==
2021 Detroit Tigers
Roster
Pitchers: 70 Tyler Alexander; 48 Matthew Boyd; 37 Beau Burrows; 73 Drew Carlton; 67 José Cisnero; 71 Miguel Del Pozo; 45 Buck Farmer; 68 Jason Foley; 32 Michael Fulmer; 36 Kyle Funkhouser; 33 Bryan Garcia; 51 Rony García; 49 Derek Holland; 40 Drew Hutchison; 77 Joe Jiménez; 63 Ian Krol; 57 Alex Lange; 25 Matt Manning; 12 Casey Mize; 44 Daniel Norris; 58 Wily Peralta; 66 Erasmo Ramírez; 29 Tarik Skubal; 65 Gregory Soto; 50 Julio Teherán; 56 Spencer Turnbull; 62 José Ureña	Catchers: 64 Dustin Garneau; 17 Grayson Greiner; 13 Eric Haase; 40 Wilson Ramos; 34 Jake Rogers; Infielders: 24,21 Miguel Cabrera; 46 Jeimer Candelario; 30 Harold Castro; 9 Willi Castro; 28 Niko Goodrum; 55 Renato Núñez; 19 Isaac Paredes; 7 Jonathan Schoop; 59 Zack Short; Outfielders: 60 Akil Baddoo; 41 Daz Cameron; 8 Robbie Grossman; 54 Derek Hill; 21 JaCoby Jones; 15 Nomar Mazara; 22 Víctor Reyes; 74 Jacob Robson	Manager: 14 A. J. Hinch; Coaches: 18 Kimera Bartee (first base, July 16-end of season); 98 Jeremy Carrell (bullpen catcher); 53 Scott Coolbaugh (hitting); 27 José Cruz Jr. (assistant hitting coach, beginning of season-June 8); 52 Chris Fetter (pitching); 18 Chip Hale (third base, beginning of season-July 4); 27 Mike Hessman (interim assistant hitting coach); 26 George Lombard (bench coach); 61 Juan Nieves (assistant pitching coach); 88 Josh Paul (quality control); 99 Tim Remes (bullpen catcher); 39 Ramón Santiago (first base, beginning of season-July 15)(third base, July 16-)

=== Player stats ===
==== Batting ====
Note: G = Games played; AB = At bats; R = Runs; H = Hits; 2B = Doubles; 3B = Triples; HR = Home runs; RBI = Runs batted in; SB = Stolen bases; BB = Walks; AVG = Batting average; SLG = Slugging average

Player	G	AB	R	H	2B	3B	HR	RBI	SB	BB	AVG	SLG
Jonathan Schoop	156	623	85	173	30	1	22	84	2	37	.278	.435
Jeimer Candelario	149	557	75	151	42	3	16	67	0	65	.271	.443
Robbie Grossman	156	557	88	133	23	3	23	67	20	98	.239	.415
Miguel Cabrera	130	472	48	121	16	0	15	75	0	40	.256	.386
Akil Baddoo	124	413	60	107	20	7	13	55	18	45	.259	.436
Willi Castro	125	413	56	91	15	6	9	38	9	23	.220	.351
Eric Haase	98	351	48	81	12	1	22	61	2	26	.231	.459
Harold Castro	106	315	35	89	13	1	3	37	1	14	.283	.359
Niko Goodrum	90	290	39	62	11	2	9	33	14	29	.214	.359
Victor Reyes	76	209	26	54	10	4	5	22	5	8	.258	.416
Nomar Mazara	50	165	12	35	5	2	3	19	0	15	.212	.321
Zack Short	61	156	21	22	4	0	6	20	2	22	.141	.282
Derek Hill	49	139	19	36	3	3	3	14	6	10	.259	.388
Wilson Ramos	35	120	12	24	5	0	6	13	0	6	.200	.392
Jake Rogers	38	113	17	27	5	3	6	17	1	11	.239	.496
Daz Cameron	35	103	16	20	5	0	4	13	6	10	.194	.359
JaCoby Jones	36	100	9	17	2	0	2	9	2	5	.170	.250
Isaac Paredes	23	72	7	15	3	1	1	5	0	10	.208	.319
Grayson Greiner	31	72	7	17	4	0	1	7	0	9	.236	.333
Dustin Garneau	20	62	9	13	5	0	6	11	0	3	.210	.581
Renato Núñez	14	53	7	10	3	0	4	7	0	1	.189	.472
Jacob Robson	4	7	1	0	0	0	0	0	0	0	.000	.000
Pitcher totals	162	14	0	1	0	0	0	1	0	3	.071	.071
Team totals	162	5376	697	1299	236	37	179	675	88	490	.242	.399

==== Pitching ====
Note: W = Wins; L = Losses; ERA = Earned run average; G = Games pitched; GS = Games started; SV = Saves; IP = Innings pitched; R = Runs allowed; ER = Earned runs allowed; BB = Walks allowed; SO = Strikeouts

Player	W	L	ERA	G	GS	SV	IP	H	R	ER	BB	SO
Casey Mize	7	9	3.71	30	30	0	150.1	130	64	62	41	118
Tarik Skubal	8	12	4.34	31	29	0	149.1	141	76	72	47	164
Tyler Alexander	2	4	3.81	41	15	0	106.1	106	47	45	28	87
José Ureña	4	8	5.81	26	18	0	100.2	119	70	65	42	67
Wily Peralta	4	5	3.07	19	18	0	93.2	87	41	32	38	58
Matt Manning	4	7	5.80	18	18	0	85.1	96	59	55	33	57
Matthew Boyd	3	8	3.89	15	15	0	78.2	77	37	34	23	67
Michael Fulmer	5	6	2.97	52	4	14	69.2	69	27	23	20	73
Kyle Funkhouser	7	4	3.42	57	2	1	68.1	58	32	26	38	63
Gregory Soto	6	3	3.39	62	0	18	63.2	46	30	24	40	76
José Cisnero	4	4	3.65	67	0	4	61.2	51	34	25	31	62
Spencer Turnbull	4	2	2.88	9	9	0	50.0	37	18	16	12	44
Derek Holland	3	2	5.07	39	1	0	49.2	58	29	28	20	51
Joe Jiménez	6	1	5.96	52	0	1	45.1	34	33	30	35	57
Bryan Garcia	3	2	7.55	39	0	2	39.1	48	38	33	25	32
Daniel Norris	1	3	5.89	38	0	1	36.2	38	25	24	15	40
Alex Lange	1	3	4.04	36	0	1	35.2	37	18	16	16	39
Buck Farmer	0	0	6.37	36	0	0	35.1	40	25	25	21	37
Erasmo Ramírez	1	1	5.74	17	0	0	26.2	24	17	17	5	20
Drew Hutchison	3	1	2.11	9	2	0	21.1	20	11	5	11	10
Ian Krol	0	0	4.34	18	0	0	18.2	23	10	9	8	18
Jason Foley	0	0	2.61	11	0	0	10.1	8	3	3	5	6
Miguel Del Pozo	0	0	3.38	5	0	0	5.1	8	2	2	2	4
Julio Teherán	1	0	1.80	1	1	0	5.0	4	1	1	3	3
Drew Carlton	0	0	4.91	4	0	0	3.2	6	2	2	4	1
Rony García	0	0	2.45	2	0	0	3.2	1	1	1	2	2
Harold Castro	0	0	0.00	3	0	0	2.2	0	0	0	3	0
Beau Burrows	0	0	21.60	1	0	0	1.2	2	4	4	2	3
Jake Rogers	0	0	18.00	1	0	0	1.0	2	2	2	1	0
Team totals	77	85	4.32	162	162	42	1419.2	1370	756	681	571	1259

== Farm system ==
Level	Team	League	Manager
AAA	Toledo Mud Hens	Triple-A East	Tom Prince
AA	Erie SeaWolves	Double-A	Arnie Beyeler
High-A	West Michigan Whitecaps	High-A Central	Brayan Peña
A	Lakeland Flying Tigers	Low-A Southeast	Andrew Graham
Rookie	FCL Tigers East	Florida Complex League	Gary Cathcart
Rookie	FCL Tigers West	Florida Complex League	Ryan Minor
Rookie	DSL Tigers 1	Dominican Summer League	Ramon Zapata
Rookie	DSL Tigers 2	Dominican Summer League	Marcos Yepez
