= 2017 Major League Baseball All-Star Game =

2017 American baseball competition

	1	2	3	4	5	6	7	8	9	10	R	H	E
American League	0	0	0	0	1	0	0	0	0	1	2	10	0
National League	0	0	0	0	0	1	0	0	0	0	1	7	0
- Date: July 11, 2017
- Venue: Marlins Park
- City: Miami, Florida
- Managers: Brad Mills (Note: Mills, the Indians' bench coach, replaced Terry Francona as the American League's manager after Francona underwent a catheter ablation to correct an irregular heartbeat.) (CLE); Joe Maddon (CHC)
- MVP: Robinson Canó (SEA)
- Attendance: 37,188
- Ceremonial first pitch: Roberto Alomar, Rod Carew, Orlando Cepeda, Pedro Martínez, Tony Pérez, Iván Rodríguez
- Television: Fox (United States); MLB International (International)
- TV announcers: Joe Buck, John Smoltz, Ken Rosenthal and Tom Verducci (Fox); Matt Vasgersian and Buck Martinez (MLB International)
- Radio: ESPN
- Radio announcers: Jon Sciambi and Chris Singleton

The 2017 Major League Baseball All-Star Game was the 88th edition of the Major League Baseball All Star Game. The game was hosted by the Miami Marlins and was played at Marlins Park on July 11, 2017. It was televised nationally by Fox. The game was the first since 2002 whose outcome did not determine home-field advantage for the World Series; instead, the team with the better regular-season record will have home-field advantage. The Marlins were announced as the hosts on February 10, 2015, by Major League Baseball Commissioner Rob Manfred; the game was the Marlins' first time hosting, leaving the Tampa Bay Rays as the only MLB franchise not to have hosted an All-Star game.

The Marlins initially were slated to host the 2000 All-Star Game, prior to having it revoked by then-National League president Len Coleman due to the concerns of both the franchise's long-term viability in the South Florida market, along with the habitually low attendance figures at Pro Player Stadium. That game was eventually moved to Turner Field in Atlanta. The Houston Astros led all of baseball in sending a record six All-Stars to the game.

The American League won, 2–1, in 10 innings. Robinson Canó, second baseman for the Seattle Mariners, hit the game-winning home run for the American League and was named the 2017 All-Star Game Most Valuable Player.

== Fan Balloting ==
=== Starters ===
Balloting for the 2017 All-Star Game starters began online May 1 and ended on June 29. The top vote-getters at each position (including the designated hitter for the American League) and the top three among outfielders, would be starters for their respective leagues. The results were announced on July 2. Bryce Harper was the leading vote-getter with 4,630,306 votes.

=== Final Roster Spot ===
After the rosters were finalized, a second ballot of five players per league was created for the All-Star Final Vote to determine the 33rd and final player of each roster. The online balloting was conducted from July 2 through July 6. The winners of the All-Star Final Vote were Mike Moustakas of the American League's Kansas City Royals and Justin Turner of the National League's Los Angeles Dodgers.

American League
Player	Team	Pos.
Elvis Andrus	Rangers	SS
Xander Bogaerts	Red Sox	SS
Didi Gregorius	Yankees	SS
Logan Morrison	Rays	1B
Mike Moustakas	Royals	3B

National League
Player	Team	Pos.
Justin Bour	Marlins	1B
Kris Bryant	Cubs	3B
Anthony Rendon	Nationals	3B
Mark Reynolds	Rockies	1B
Justin Turner	Dodgers	3B

== Rosters ==
=== American League ===
Elected starters
Position	Player	Team	All-Star Games
C	Salvador Pérez	Royals	5
1B	Justin Smoak	Blue Jays	1
2B	Jose Altuve	Astros	5
3B	José Ramírez	Indians	1
SS	Carlos Correa	Astros	1
OF	Mike Trout^{#}	Angels	6
OF	Aaron Judge	Yankees	1
OF	George Springer	Astros	1
DH	Corey Dickerson	Rays	1

Reserves
Position	Player	Team	All-Star Games
C	Gary Sánchez	Yankees	1
1B	Yonder Alonso	Athletics	1
2B	Robinson Canó^{[E]}	Mariners	8
2B	Starlin Castro^{#}	Yankees	4
2B	Jonathan Schoop	Orioles	1
3B	Mike Moustakas	Royals	2
3B	Miguel Sanó	Twins	1
SS	Francisco Lindor	Indians	2
OF	Mookie Betts^{[A]}	Red Sox	2
OF	Michael Brantley	Indians	2
OF	Avisaíl García	White Sox	1
OF	Justin Upton^{[B]}	Tigers	4
DH	Nelson Cruz	Mariners	5

Pitchers
Player	Team	All-Star Games
Chris Archer^{[G]}	Rays	2
Dellin Betances	Yankees	4
Yu Darvish^{#}	Rangers	4
Chris Devenski^{[C]}	Astros	1
Michael Fulmer^{#}	Tigers	1
Dallas Keuchel^{#}	Astros	2
Craig Kimbrel	Red Sox	6
Brandon Kintzler^{[H]}	Twins	1
Corey Kluber^{#}	Indians	2
Lance McCullers Jr.	Astros	1
Andrew Miller	Indians	2
Roberto Osuna^{[F]}	Blue Jays	1
Chris Sale	Red Sox	6
Ervin Santana	Twins	2
Luis Severino	Yankees	1
Jason Vargas	Royals	1

=== National League ===
Elected starters
Position	Player	Team	All-Star Games
C	Buster Posey	Giants	5
1B	Ryan Zimmerman	Nationals	2
2B	Daniel Murphy	Nationals	3
3B	Nolan Arenado	Rockies	3
SS	Zack Cozart	Reds	1
OF	Charlie Blackmon	Rockies	2
OF	Bryce Harper	Nationals	5
OF	Marcell Ozuna	Marlins	2

Reserves
Position	Player	Team	All-Star Games
C	Yadier Molina	Cardinals	8
1B	Paul Goldschmidt	Diamondbacks	5
1B	Joey Votto	Reds	5
2B	Josh Harrison	Pirates	2
2B	DJ LeMahieu	Rockies	2
3B	Jake Lamb	Diamondbacks	1
3B	Justin Turner	Dodgers	1
SS	Corey Seager	Dodgers	2
OF	Cody Bellinger	Dodgers	1
OF	Michael Conforto	Mets	1
OF	Ender Inciarte	Braves	1
OF	Giancarlo Stanton	Marlins	4

Pitchers
Player	Team	All-Star Games
Wade Davis	Cubs	3
Zack Greinke	Diamondbacks	4
Brad Hand	Padres	1
Greg Holland	Rockies	3
Kenley Jansen	Dodgers	2
Clayton Kershaw^{#}	Dodgers	7
Corey Knebel	Brewers	1
Carlos Martínez	Cardinals	2
Pat Neshek	Phillies	2
Robbie Ray	Diamondbacks	1
Max Scherzer	Nationals	5
Stephen Strasburg	Nationals	3
Alex Wood^{[D]}	Dodgers	1

==== Roster notes ====
1. Mookie Betts was named starter in place of Mike Trout due to injury.
2. Justin Upton was named as the roster replacement for Mike Trout due to injury.
3. Chris Devenski was named as the roster replacement for Dallas Keuchel due to injury.
4. Alex Wood was named as the roster replacement for Clayton Kershaw due to Kershaw starting on Sunday.
5. Robinson Canó was named as the roster replacement for Starlin Castro due to injury.
6. Roberto Osuna was named as the roster replacement for Yu Darvish due to Darvish starting on Sunday.
7. Chris Archer was named as the roster replacement for Michael Fulmer due to Fulmer starting on Sunday.
8. Brandon Kintzler was named as the roster replacement for Corey Kluber due to Kluber starting on Sunday.

#: Indicates player would not play (replaced as per reference notes above).

== Game Summary ==
The game was mostly pitching-dominated through the first four innings. After a two-out double by Jonathan Schoop, Miguel Sanó finally got the AL on the board with his fifth inning RBI bloop single. In the bottom of the sixth, Yadier Molina became the oldest catcher to hit a home run in an All-Star game, when he hit one off Ervin Santana in the sixth inning, tying the game at one. Reggie Smith was the last Cardinal to hit an All-Star Game home run in the 1974 game. Robinson Canó hit the game-winning home run in the tenth inning off Wade Davis, and was named the All-Star Game Most Valuable Player. He is the first second baseman since 1998 who was named All-Star Game MVP. Andrew Miller struck out Cody Bellinger swinging to end the night and earned his first career All-Star save.

=== Starting Lineup ===
American
Order	Player	Team	Position
1	Jose Altuve	Astros	2B
2	José Ramírez	Indians	3B
3	Aaron Judge	Yankees	RF
4	George Springer	Astros	LF
5	Carlos Correa	Astros	SS
6	Justin Smoak	Blue Jays	1B
7	Corey Dickerson	Rays	DH
8	Salvador Pérez	Royals	C
9	Mookie Betts	Red Sox	CF
	Chris Sale	Red Sox	P

National
Order	Player	Team	Position
1	Charlie Blackmon	Rockies	CF
2	Giancarlo Stanton	Marlins	DH
3	Bryce Harper	Nationals	RF
4	Buster Posey	Giants	C
5	Daniel Murphy	Nationals	2B
6	Nolan Arenado	Rockies	3B
7	Ryan Zimmerman	Nationals	1B
8	Marcell Ozuna	Marlins	LF
9	Zack Cozart	Reds	SS
	Max Scherzer	Nationals	P

=== Line Score ===
Tuesday, July 11, 2017 8:22 pm (EDT) Marlins Park in Miami, Florida, 73 °F (23 °C), roof closed
Team	1	2	3	4	5	6	7	8	9	10	R	H	E
American League	0	0	0	0	1	0	0	0	0	1	2	10	0
National League	0	0	0	0	0	1	0	0	0	0	1	7	0
Starting pitchers: AL: Chris Sale; NL: Max Scherzer; WP: Craig Kimbrel (1–0) LP: Wade Davis (0–1) Sv: Andrew Miller (1); Home runs: AL: Robinson Canó (1); NL: Yadier Molina (1); Attendance: 37,188 Time: 3:16; Umpires: Home Plate – Joe West (crew chief); First Base – Angel Hernandez; Second Base – Mark Carlson; Third Base – Chris Conroy; Left Field – Manny Gonzalez; Right Field – Mike Estabrook; Replay Official – Doug Eddings

== National Anthems ==
Jocelyn Alice sang the Canadian national anthem while Bebe Rexha sang the American national anthem.

== Ratings ==
The viewership ratings for the game on FOX were up slightly following the previous year's all-time low, with a 5.5 national rating, an 11 share, and an estimated 9.28 million viewers.

== See Also ==
- List of Major League Baseball All-Star Games
- Major League Baseball All-Star Game Most Valuable Player Award
- All-Star Futures Game
- Home Run Derby
