= Jonathan Schoop =

Curaçaoan baseball player (born 1991)

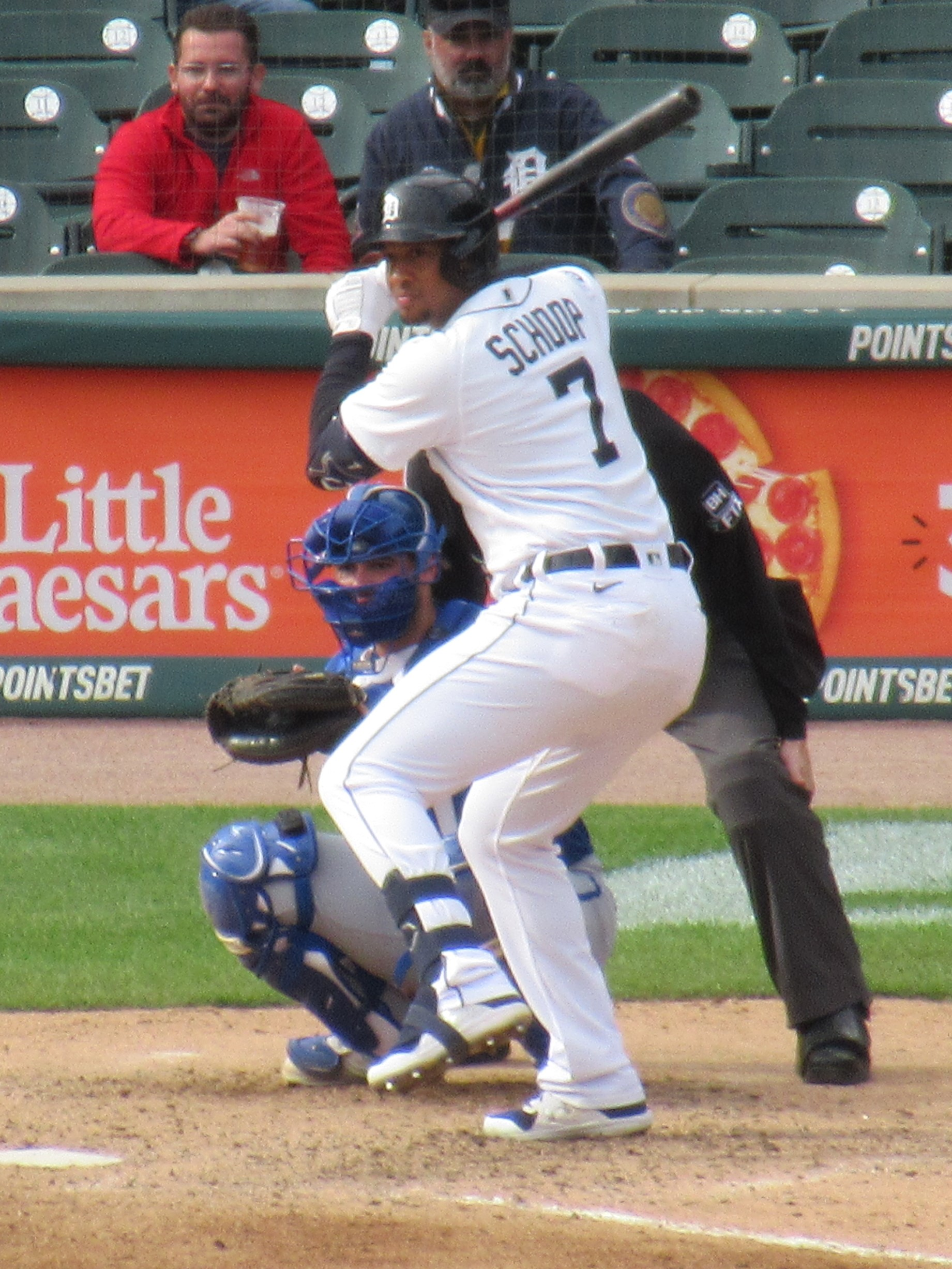
- Schoop with the Detroit Tigers in 2022

Dorados de Chihuahua – No. 7
- Second baseman
- Born: October 16, 1991 (age 34); Willemstad, Curaçao
- Bats: Right Throws: Right

MLB debut
- September 25, 2013, for the Baltimore Orioles

MLB statistics (through 2023 season)
- Batting average: .254
- Hits: 1,095
- Home runs: 174
- Runs batted in: 544
- Stats at Baseball Reference

Teams
- Baltimore Orioles (2013–2018); Milwaukee Brewers (2018); Minnesota Twins (2019); Detroit Tigers (2020–2023)

Career highlights and awards
- All-Star (2017)
Medals
Men's baseball
Representing Netherlands
Baseball World Cup
Gold medal – first place	2011 Panama	Team
European Baseball Championship
Silver medal – second place	2012 Netherlands	Team
Gold medal – first place	2025 Netherlands	Team

Jonathan Rufino Jezus Schoop (/skoʊp/ SCOPE; born October 16, 1991) is a Curaçaoan professional baseball second baseman for the Dorados de Chihuahua of the Mexican League. He has previously played in Major League Baseball (MLB) for the Baltimore Orioles, Milwaukee Brewers, Minnesota Twins, and Detroit Tigers. He was an All-Star in 2017.

== Professional career ==
Before he became a major leaguer, he played in the 2003 and 2004 Little League World Series for Curaçao. Schoop was considered the best player on the 2004 team that won the tournament, which included fellow future MLB All Star Jurickson Profar.

Schoop signed with the Baltimore Orioles as a free agent in 2008. In 2011, Schoop and Manny Machado represented the Orioles at the 2011 All-Star Futures Game. That year, he was named the Brooks Robinson Minor League Player of the Year, given to the best player in the Orioles minor league system. In his first two minor league seasons, Schoop primarily played shortstop, but starting in 2011, second base was his most frequent defensive position.

Prior to the 2012 season, Schoop was ranked by Baseball America as the Orioles' third-best prospect and the 82nd-best overall. He was also ranked the team's third best prospect by FanGraphs.

=== Baltimore Orioles ===
==== 2013–2016 ====
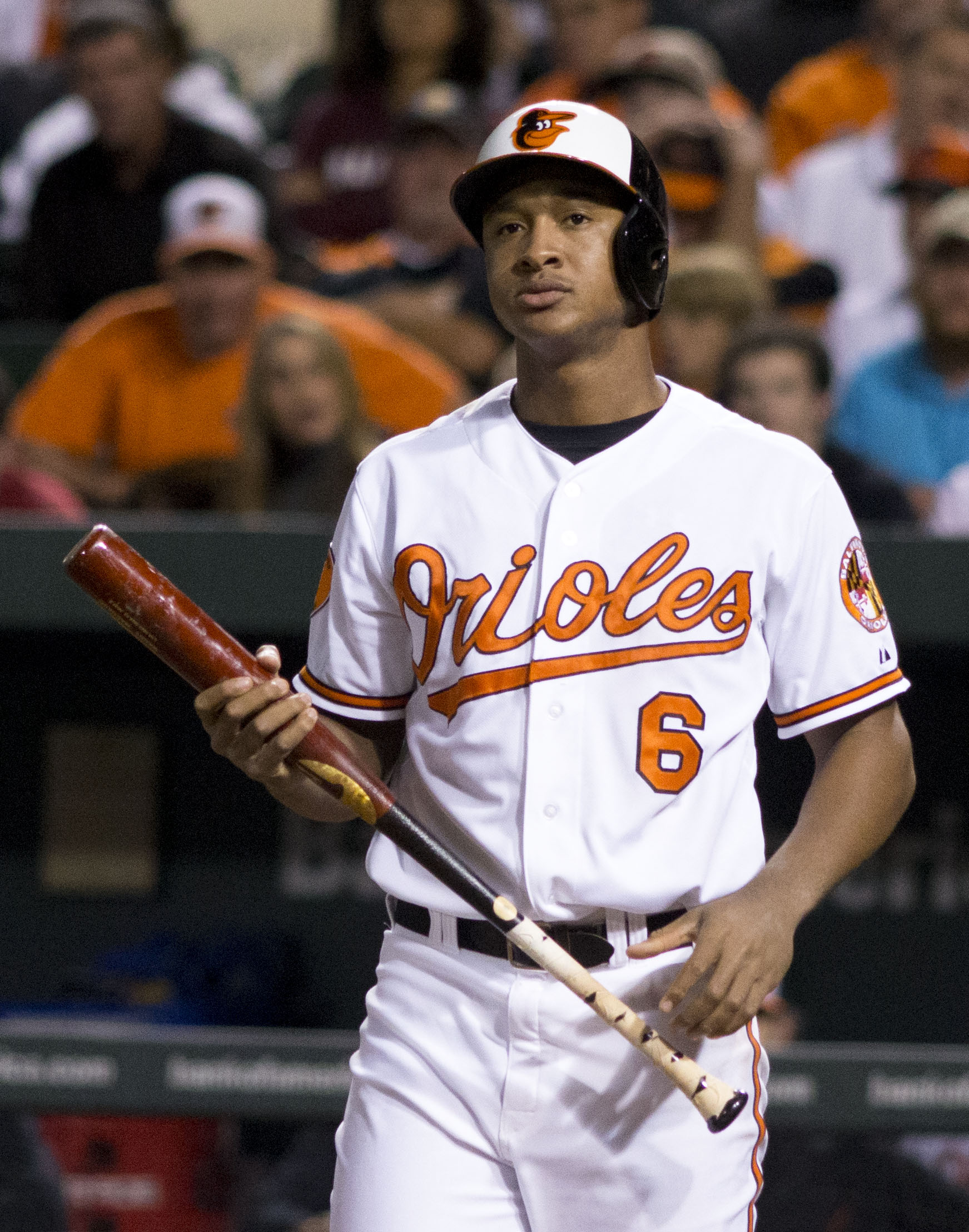
Schoop playing for the Baltimore Orioles in 2013

After 81 games in the minors in 2013, Schoop was recalled by the Orioles from the Triple-A Norfolk Tides on September 3. Three weeks later, in his first major league at-bat on September 25, Schoop singled off Toronto Blue Jays pitcher Esmil Rogers. Two at-bats later, he hit his first career home run off Kyle Drabek, a 430-foot shot. He finished the game 2-for-3 with a home run, an RBI, a walk, and 3 runs scored. Schoop played in five Orioles games and hit .286 (4-for-14), scoring five runs, hitting one home run, and driving in one run.

Schoop was Orioles starting second baseman on Opening Day in 2014, batting ninth. On April 9, he hit his second career home run, a three-run shot off Yankees starter Masahiro Tanaka over the left field foul pole at Yankee Stadium, helping the Orioles to a 5–4 victory. In 137 games in 2014, Schoop batted .209 with 16 home runs and 45 RBI. The Orioles clinched their first regular season AL East championship since 1997. Schoop hit .300 in the Orioles' ALDS sweep of the Detroit Tigers, also driving in two runs. In the ALCS, however, Schoop only hit .091 (1-for-11), as the Orioles were swept by the Kansas City Royals.

On April 11, 2015, Schoop hit his first career grand slam, off Blue Jays reliever Todd Redmond. On April 17, 2015, Schoop sustained a partially torn PCL and sprained MCL, and the Orioles placed him on the disabled list. He returned to the Orioles on July 5. In 86 games in 2015, Schoop hit .279 with 15 home runs, 39 RBIs, and two stolen bases in two attempts. The Orioles finished the season with an 81–81 record, missing the postseason.

==== 2016–2018 ====
Schoop hit .351 while hitting three home runs and driving in eight in the first ten games of 2016. By the end of April, he had hit four home runs, driven in 11 runs, and hit .256. Schoop hit his first grand slam of the season on May 14 in a 9–3 comeback victory over the Tigers. It was Schoop's second home run of the game. On August 14, Schoop hit a go-ahead three-run home run against San Francisco Giants closer Santiago Casilla in the top of the 9th inning to complete a seven-run comeback for the Orioles, who trailed 7–1 after 6 innings. Schoop hit his 20th home run of the season on August 22, his first career 20-homer season. He became the fifth Oriole on the year to have at least 20 home runs, making the Orioles the only Major League club to accomplish this feat on the year. On August 31, Schoop hit his 21st home run of the season, and the 55th of the month for the Orioles, tying an MLB record just two months after the team set the home run record in June. Baltimore became the first team to hit at least 55 home runs in a month on two occasions. Schoop hit his 25th home run of the season on September 30 against the Yankees, making him the fifth Oriole on the year with at least 25 homers. This tied the franchise record set in 1996. They also became the 12th team in MLB history to do so. It was also the Orioles 250th home run of the season, passing the 2000 Houston Astros for fifth-most home runs in a single-season all-time. He finished the 2016 season with 38 doubles, 25 home runs, 82 RBI and batted .267/.298/.454 while starting all 162 regular season games and the AL Wild Card game against the Blue Jays.

Schoop had his best season with the bat in 2017. Through July 2, he had a .297/.352/.545 batting line with 16 home runs and 51 RBIs, earning him a trip to the MLB All-Star Game. In the All-Star Game, Schoop doubled and scored the first run of the game in the fifth inning in his only at-bat. Schoop played in 160 games in 2017, batting .293/.338/.503 with 32 homers and 105 runs batted in. He had career-highs in batting average, on-base percentage, slugging percentage, OPS+, runs scored, hits, home runs, and RBI. He placed 12th in American League MVP voting.

On April 14, 2018, Schoop was placed on the 10-day disabled list due to a right oblique strain. After a disappointing first half that saw him hit just .229 in the first half with ten homers and 25 RBI, Schoop got hot after the All-Star break, tying the MLB record for consecutive games with a home run by a second baseman, with five, from July 22 to 27.

=== Milwaukee Brewers ===
On July 31, 2018, the Orioles traded Schoop to the Milwaukee Brewers for infielder Jonathan Villar and minor leaguers Luis Ortiz and Jean Carmona. Schoop struggled with the Brewers, hitting .202/.246/.331 after the trade. He also failed to get a hit in any of his eight postseason at-bats with the Brewers. Schoop elected free agency on November 30.

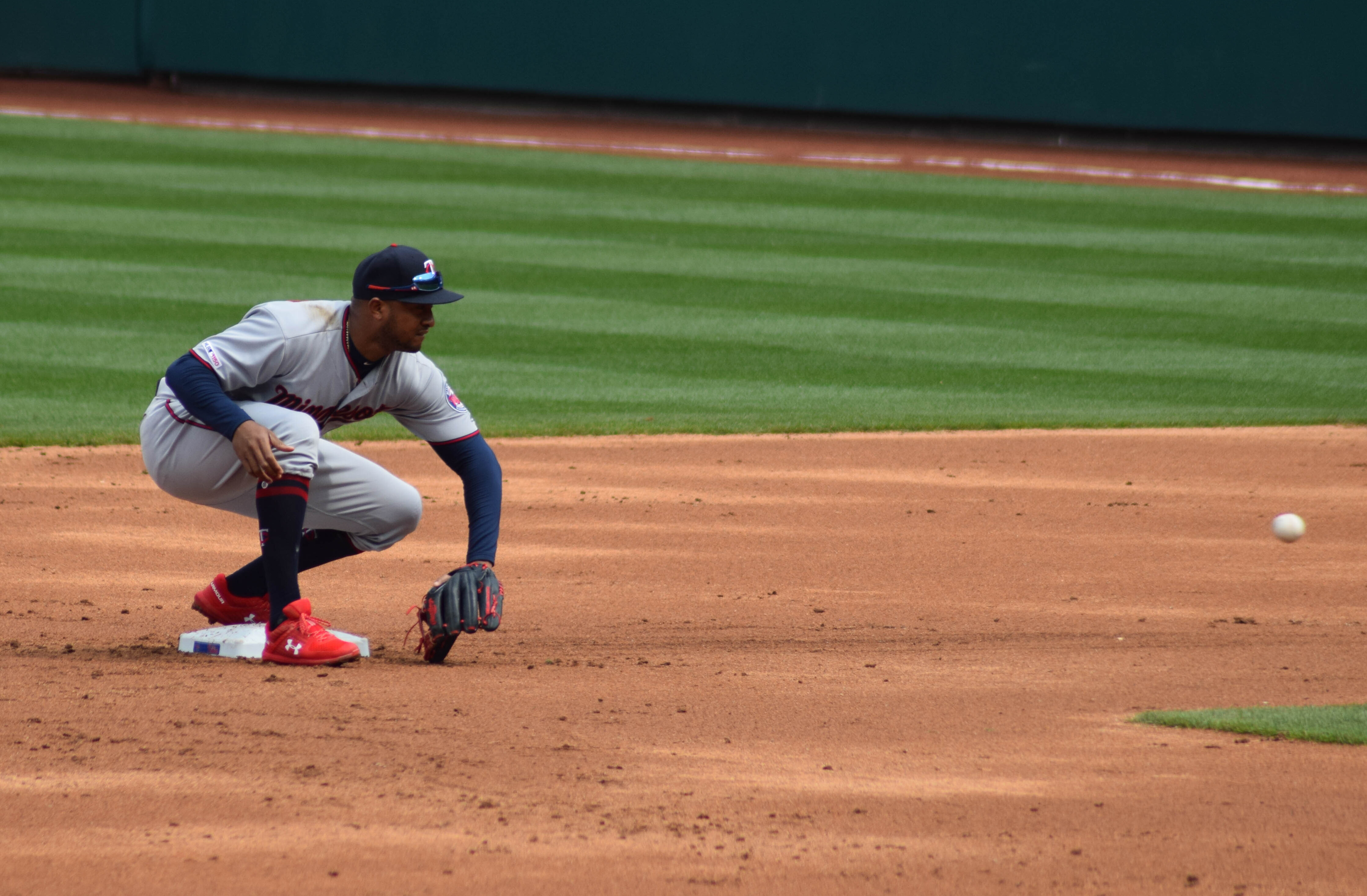
Schoop with Minnesota in 2019

=== Minnesota Twins ===
On December 6, 2018, Schoop signed a one-year, $7.5 million contract with the Minnesota Twins.

Schoop hit his 20th and 21st home runs of the 2019 season on August 28, 2019. In doing so, he became the seventh Twins player to hit at least 20 home runs that season, tying a record matched 8 times in MLB history. In his single season in Minnesota, Schoop's offense rebounded moderately, batting .256 with 23 home runs.

=== Detroit Tigers ===
On December 21, 2019, Schoop signed a one-year, $6.1 million contract with the Detroit Tigers.

On July 24, 2020, Schoop was the Tigers' Opening Day second baseman. He remained the everyday second baseman until he got hit on the wrist and was placed on the 10-day injured list on September 13. Schoop was moved to the 45-day IL the following week, ending his 2020 season. In 44 games in the 2020 season, Schoop hit .278 with 8 home runs and 23 RBI.

On February 5, 2021, Schoop re-signed with the Tigers on a one-year, $4.5 million contract. During the 2021 season, Schoop played more games, 114, at first base than the 38 games at his usual second base. This was due to the struggles and subsequent demotion of Renato Núñez as well as Miguel Cabrera being frequently used as a designated hitter.

On August 7, 2021, Schoop signed a two-year, $15 million contract extension with the Detroit Tigers, with an opt-out clause after the 2022 season. In 2021, Schoop hit .278 with 22 home runs and a team-leading 84 RBI. He played in 156 games, the most since his All-Star season.

Schoop returned to playing mostly at second base in the 2022 season. On May 30, he had three hits against the Twins, including his 1,000th career hit, a double off former teammate Dylan Bundy. Schoop was the third player from Curaçao to reach 1,000 major league hits, after Andruw Jones and Andrelton Simmons.

Schoop's hitting in 2022 was the worst of his career and among the worst in all batters that year. He had the lowest batting average of all qualified American League batters at .202 and the lowest on-base percentage and OPS in the majors, at .239 and .561, respectively. Batted ball data agreed with his poor results: he had the highest rate of softly hit balls of all batters at 24.1%. Defensively, he led MLB in outs above average and was nominated for a Gold Glove Award at second base.

Schoop's bat did not get markedly better in 2023. In 55 games for Detroit, he slashed .213/.278/.272 with no home runs and 7 RBI. On July 8, the Tigers designated Schoop for assignment, and they released him on July 13.

=== Algodoneros de Unión Laguna ===
On April 3, 2024, Schoop signed with the Algodoneros de Unión Laguna of the Mexican League. In 81 games for the club, he slashed .253/.344/.474 with 15 home runs and 60 RBI. The Algondoneros lost a playoff series to Tecolotes de los Dos Laredos, though Schoop hit a home run in his team's series-ending loss.

Schoop made 91 appearances for the team in 2025, slashing .280/.333/.467 with 15 home runs and 64 RBI. He was released on January 30, 2026.

=== Dorados de Chihuahua ===
On March 4, 2026, Schoop signed with the Dorados de Chihuahua of the Mexican League.

== International career ==
Schoop played for the Netherlands national team at the 2011 Baseball World Cup, 2012 European Baseball Championship, 2013 World Baseball Classic, 2017 World Baseball Classic, the 2023 World Baseball Classic, 2024 WBSC Premier12, and 2025 European Championship.

On January 10, 2024, Schoop was announced as part of the Willemstad Cannons roster that would represent Curaçao in the 2024 Intercontinental Series in Barranquilla, Colombia, though the series was canceled. Two days later, he was also named to the Curaçao Suns roster in the 2024 Caribbean Series in Miami. Schoop did not participate in the 2026 World Baseball Classic because he was held in custody over weapons charges.

== Personal life ==
Schoop's brother, Sharlon Schoop, is also a professional baseball player. They have played together on the Dutch national team.

In January 2026, he was arrested by Curaçao police on suspicion of possession of prohibited weapons. He was released from detention on February 28.
