= Renato Núñez =

Venezuelan baseball player (born 1994)

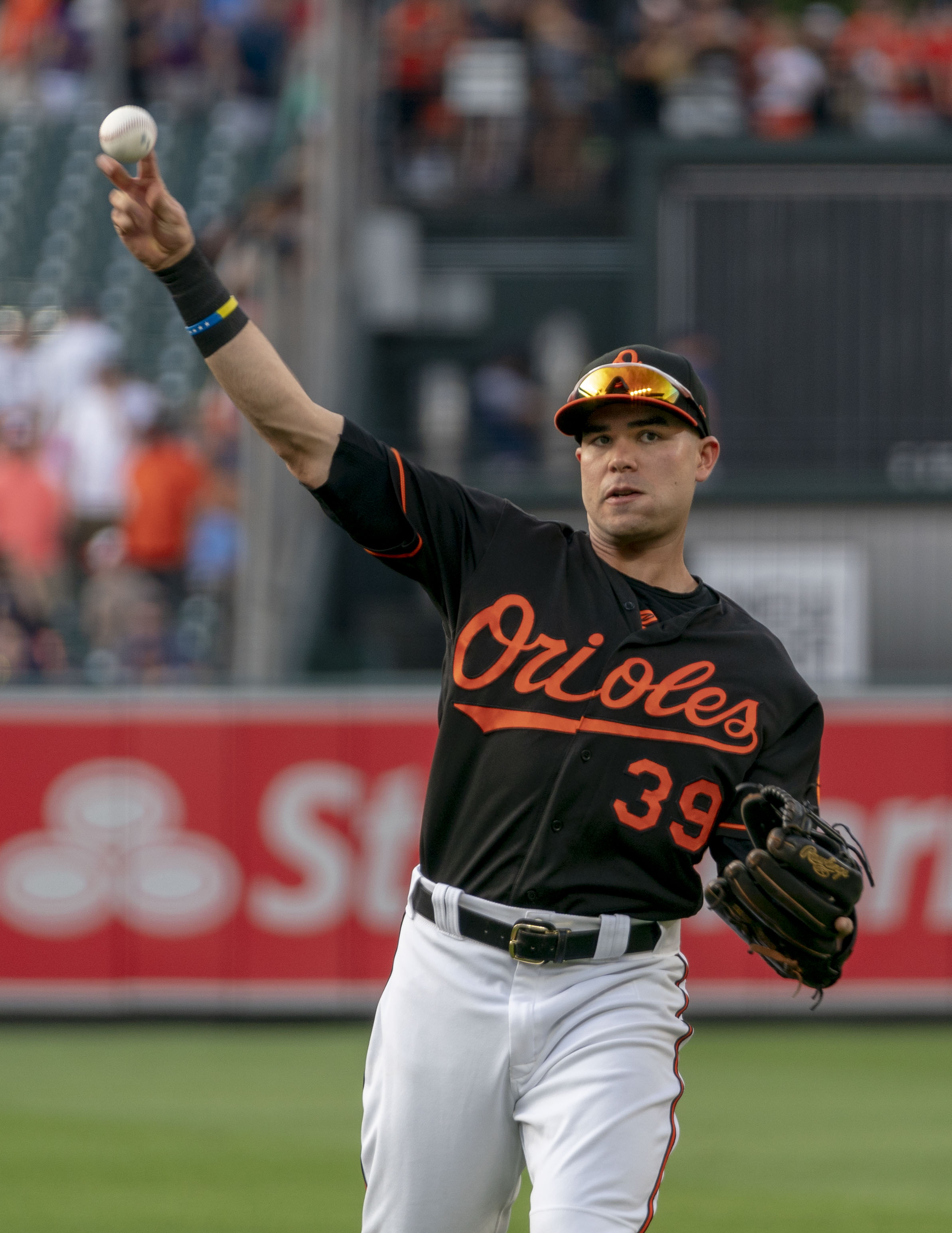
- Núñez with the Baltimore Orioles in 2018

Caciques de Distrito – No. 39
- Third baseman
- Born: April 4, 1994 (age 32); Valencia, Venezuela
- Bats: Right Throws: Right

Professional debut
- MLB: September 12, 2016, for the Oakland Athletics
- NPB: March 25, 2022, for the Hokkaido Nippon-Ham Fighters

MLB statistics (through 2021 season)
- Batting average: .245
- Home runs: 56
- Runs batted in: 154

NPB statistics (through 2022 season)
- Batting average: .174
- Home runs: 4
- Runs batted in: 12
- Stats at Baseball Reference

Teams
- Oakland Athletics (2016–2017); Texas Rangers (2018); Baltimore Orioles (2018–2020); Detroit Tigers (2021); Hokkaido Nippon-Ham Fighters (2022)

Renato Rafael Núñez (born April 4, 1994) is a Venezuelan professional baseball third baseman for the Caciques de Distrito of the Venezuelan Major League. He has previously played in Major League Baseball (MLB) with the Oakland Athletics, Texas Rangers, Baltimore Orioles, and Detroit Tigers and in Nippon Professional Baseball (NPB) for the Hokkaido Nippon-Ham Fighters.

== Career ==
=== Oakland Athletics ===
Núñez signed with the Oakland Athletics as an international free agent at 16 in 2010. He made his professional debut that season for the Dominican Summer League Athletics. In 2011, Núñez played for the Arizona League Athletics, hitting .325/.403/.550 and four home runs over 42 games. He played for the Beloit Snappers in 2013. He hit .258/.301/.423 with 19 home runs in 128 games. Núñez played the 2014 season with the Stockton Ports. In July, he played in the All-Star Futures Game, where he singled. He finished the season hitting .279/.336/.517 with 29 home runs. After the season, the Athletics added Núñez to their 40-man roster. He played the 2015 season with the Double-A Midland RockHounds before participating in the Arizona Fall League. He played the entire 2016 minor league season with the Triple-A Nashville Sounds, and was called up to the Athletics on September 12. Núñez was assigned to Nashville for the 2017 season. He was selected to play in the 2017 Triple-A All-Star Game in which he hit a three-run home run to help the Pacific Coast League defeat the International League, earning him the MVP Award for the Pacific Coast League.

=== Texas Rangers ===
Núñez injured his left hamstring in the first week of spring training in 2018. He began the season on the disabled list and was sent to Nashville on rehabilitation assignment. Nearing the end of the assignment and out of options, Nunez was placed on waivers and subsequently claimed by the Texas Rangers on April 15. After appearing in 13 games and batting .167/.244/.278 with two RBIs in 36 at-bats, he was designated for assignment by the Rangers when Rougned Odor was activated from the disabled list on May 11.

=== Baltimore Orioles ===
Núñez was claimed off waivers by the Baltimore Orioles on May 13, 2018, and outrighted to the Triple-A Norfolk Tides two days later on May 15. His contract was selected two months later on July 20, and he made his Orioles debut as the starting third baseman in a ten-inning 8–7 loss to the Toronto Blue Jays at Rogers Centre that same night. His opportunity at becoming the regular third baseman was made possible by the fire sale trade of Manny Machado two days prior during the All-Star break. He played in 60 games and batted .275/.336/.445/.781 with thirteen doubles, seven homers and twenty runs batted in by the end of 2018.

He achieved his first-ever five-hit game in a 6–5 away defeat to the New York Yankees on August 14, 2019. The starting designated hitter in 109 games in 2019, he ranked second on the team with 31 home runs and 90 runs batted in and third in doubles with 24.

In 2020 for the Orioles, Núñez slashed .256/.324/.492 with 12 home runs and 31 RBI. Despite leading the team with 43 homers since the start of 2019, he was designated for assignment on November 20, 2020. The Orioles needed to create a spot on its 40-man roster to protect an additional minor-league prospect in preparation for the Rule 5 draft. He was released five days later on November 25 after he cleared unconditional waivers and the Orioles were unable to trade him. He had been projected to get a raise between $2 million and $4 million in his first year of arbitration eligibility.

=== Detroit Tigers ===
On February 10, 2021, Núñez signed a minor league contract with the Detroit Tigers organization that included an invitation to Spring Training. On March 27, 2021, Tigers manager A. J. Hinch announced that Núñez was cut from the opening day roster. Núñez had three days to accept his minor league assignment or opt out of his contract and become a free agent. He chose the former on March 29, and was assigned to AAA Toledo.

On April 11, 2021, Núñez was selected to the active roster after Miguel Cabrera was placed on the 10-day injured list. On April 12 against the Houston Astros, Núñez hit his first home run as a Tiger. On April 21, Núñez was designated for assignment by Detroit after hitting just .148/.207/.444 with 2 home runs. On April 26, he was outrighted to the alternate training site. On August 11, 2021, Núñez was once again selected to the active roster after Derek Hill was placed on the 10-day injured list and Akil Baddoo was placed on the 7-day concussion injured list. On August 21, Núñez was once again designated for assignment by the Tigers. On August 23, he cleared waivers and was assigned outright to Triple-A Toledo. On August 27, Núñez was released by the Tigers.

=== Milwaukee Brewers ===
On August 30, 2021, the Milwaukee Brewers signed Núñez to a minor league contract and assigned him to the Triple-A Nashville Sounds. On October 13, Núñez elected free agency.

=== Hokkaido Nippon-Ham Fighters ===
On November 5, 2021, Núñez signed a one-year, $1.6 million contract with the Hokkaido Nippon-Ham Fighters of Nippon Professional Baseball. In 2022, Núñez appeared in 63 games for the Fighters, mustering a .174/.228/.299 batting line with 4 home runs and 12 RBI.

=== Toros de Tijuana ===
On January 4, 2023, Núñez signed with the Toros de Tijuana of the Mexican League. In 9 games, he batted .303/.425/.455 with 10 hits and 4 RBIs. He was released on May 2.

=== Acereros de Monclova ===
On June 13, 2023, Núñez signed with the Acereros de Monclova of the Mexican League. In 6 games, he slashed .160/.185/.240 with 4 hits and 4 RBIs.

=== Leones de Yucatán ===
On June 26, 2023, Núñez had his rights traded to the Leones de Yucatán of the Mexican League, and officially signed on June 27. In 5 games, he batted .167/.167/.222 with 3 hits and 1 RBI. Núñez was released on July 3.'

=== Caciques de Distrito ===
Núñez joined the Caciques de Distrito of the Venezuelan Major League in July 2023. In 13 at-bats, he had three hits and one RBI.

=== Guerreros de Oaxaca ===
On December 20, 2023, Núñez signed with the Guerreros de Oaxaca of the Mexican League. In 13 games for the Guerreros, he batted .327/.389/.531 with three home runs and 11 RBI. Núñez was released by Oaxaca on May 20, 2024.

=== Caciques de Distrito (second stint) ===
Núñez returned to Venezuela following his release from Oaxaca to play with the Caciques. In 40 regular season at-bats, he slashed .225/.365/.625 with five home runs and 13 RBI. In the postseason, he went 2-for-15 with two RBI and four strikeouts.

=== Saraperos de Saltillo ===
On October 21, 2024, Núñez signed with the Saraperos de Saltillo of the Mexican League. In 50 appearances for Saltillo, he batted .272/.394/.462 with nine home runs and 31 RBI. Núñez was released by the Saraperos on July 14, 2025.

=== Caciques de Distrito (third stint) ===
On February 21, 2026, Núñez confirmed he would stay in Venezuela and play the entire 2026 season with the Caciques de Distrito of the Venezuelan Major League.

== See also ==
- List of Major League Baseball players from Venezuela
