= Gregory Soto =

Dominican baseball player (born 1995)

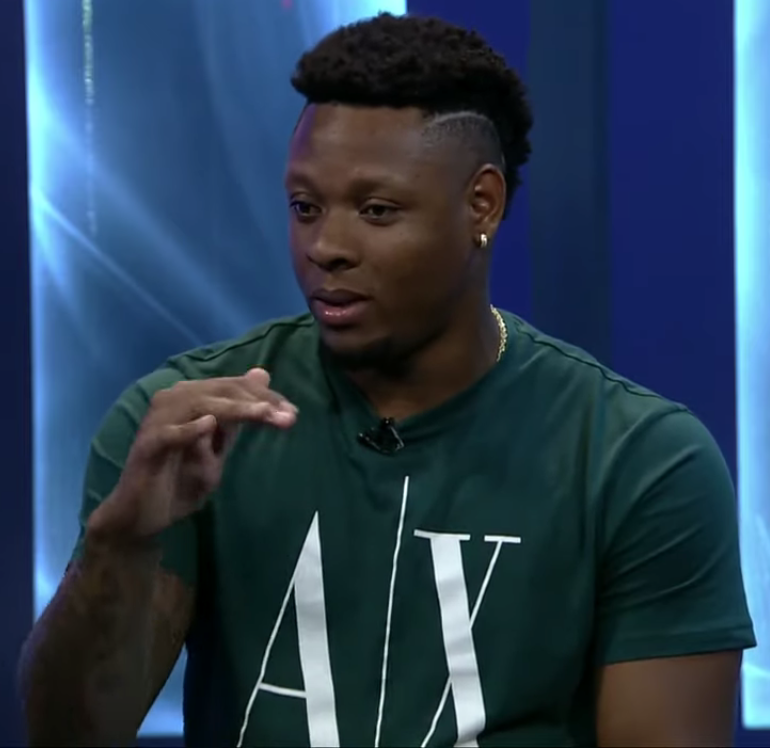
- Soto in 2019

Free agent
- Pitcher
- Born: February 11, 1995 (age 31); Haina, Dominican Republic
- Bats: Left Throws: Left

MLB debut
- May 11, 2019, for the Detroit Tigers

MLB statistics (through 2026 season)
- Win–loss record: 21–39
- Earned run average: 4.17
- Strikeouts: 489
- Saves: 72
- Stats at Baseball Reference

Teams
- Detroit Tigers (2019–2022); Philadelphia Phillies (2023–2024); Baltimore Orioles (2024–2025); New York Mets (2025); Pittsburgh Pirates (2026)

Career highlights and awards
- 2× All-Star (2021, 2022)

Gregory Soto (born February 11, 1995) is a Dominican professional baseball pitcher who is a free agent. He has played in Major League Baseball (MLB) for the Detroit Tigers, Philadelphia Phillies, Baltimore Orioles, New York Mets, and Pittsburgh Pirates. He made his MLB debut in 2019 with the Tigers, and is a two-time All-Star.

== Career ==
=== Detroit Tigers ===
==== Minor leagues ====
Soto signed with the Detroit Tigers as an international free agent on December 26, 2012. He made his professional debut in 2013 with the Dominican Summer League Tigers, pitching to a 1–2 record and 4.82 ERA in 16 games (12 starts), and returned there in 2014 where he improved, going 5–3 with a 3.20 ERA in 16 games (ten starts). He spent 2015 with the Gulf Coast Tigers and Connecticut Tigers, posting a combined 2–5 record and 3.23 ERA with 45 strikeouts in 39 total innings between the two teams, and 2016 with Connecticut where he was 3–2 with a 3.03 ERA and 1.43 WHIP in 15 starts.

Soto started 2017 with the West Michigan Whitecaps and was promoted to the Lakeland Flying Tigers during the season. After going 12–2 with a 2.25 ERA and 144 strikeouts between the two teams, he was named the Tigers minor league pitcher of the year.

On November 20, 2017, the Tigers added Soto to their 40-man roster to protect him from the Rule 5 draft.

He spent the 2018 season with Lakeland, going 8–8 with a 4.45 ERA in 113 innings. On January 11, 2019, Soto was suspended for 20 games by Major League Baseball for “conduct detrimental to baseball" under Article XII(B). The suspension started on Opening Day. He was activated on April 20 and optioned to Lakeland, appearing in one game before being promoted to the Erie SeaWolves.

==== Major leagues ====
Soto made his major league debut on May 11, 2019 against the Minnesota Twins, starting the second game of a doubleheader as the 26th man. He appeared mostly in middle relief for the Tigers, making seven starts among his 33 appearances and posting a 5.77 ERA with 45 strikeouts.

Soto made the Tigers roster out of 2020 summer camp. On August 29, 2020, he earned his first career save against the Twins. With the 2020 Detroit Tigers, he appeared in 27 games, all in relief, compiling a 0–1 record with 4.30 ERA and 29 strikeouts in 23.0 innings pitched.

Soto made the Tigers Opening Day roster for the 2021 season. Despite allowing a two-run homer, he earned the save in a 3–2 Opening Day win over the Cleveland Indians on April 1. Soto was named to the 2021 American League All-Star team. At the time of his selection, Soto was 4–1 with a 2.18 ERA. He had 38 strikeouts in 33 innings, and was six-for-six in save opportunities. Soto pitched one inning in the All-Star Game, allowing a solo home run to J. T. Realmuto. Soto suffered a fractured finger after getting hit by a line drive on September 17, and was shut down for the remainder of the season. He finished 2021 with a 6–3 record, 3.39 ERA and 18 saves in 19 opportunities, while striking out 76 batters in 63 2/3 innings.

In the 2022 season, Soto continued his role as the primary closer for the Tigers. On July 10, Soto was selected to represent the Tigers at the 2022 All-Star Game, his second consecutive All-Star selection. At the time of the selection, Soto had 17 saves in 19 opportunities, with a 2.67 ERA and 31 strikeouts in 30 1/3 innings. In the All-Star game, Soto came to the mound with two outs in the bottom of the seventh inning. After walking Ian Happ, Soto coaxed a ground ball from 2022 Home Run Derby champ Juan Soto for an inning-ending force out. Soto pitched 64 games in 2022, compiling 30 saves, a 3.28 ERA and 60 strikeouts in 60 1/3 innings.

=== Philadelphia Phillies ===
On January 7, 2023, the Tigers traded Soto and Kody Clemens to the Philadelphia Phillies in exchange for outfielder Matt Vierling, infielder Nick Maton, and catcher Donny Sands. On January 13, Soto agreed to a one-year, $3.9 million contract with the Phillies, avoiding salary arbitration. He made 69 appearances out of the bullpen for the Phillies, compiling a 4.62 ERA with 65 strikeouts and 3 saves across 60 1/3 innings pitched.

Soto made 43 appearances for Philadelphia in 2024, recording a 4.08 ERA with 44 strikeouts and 2 saves across 35 1/3 innings pitched.

=== Baltimore Orioles ===
On July 30, 2024, the Phillies traded Soto to the Baltimore Orioles for minor league pitchers Seth Johnson and Moisés Chace.

Despite pitching to a 5.09 ERA with the Orioles, due to giving up eight earned runs in his first three appearances, Soto allowed just two earned runs in his final 16 1/3 innings pitched (1.10 ERA), holding batters to a .190 average while collecting 20 strikeouts. He made the Orioles AL Wild Card roster, appearing in one game as the O's lost the series to the Kansas City Royals 2–0.

Across 45 games for Baltimore in 2025, Soto posted a 3.96 ERA and 44 strikeouts across 36 1/3 innings pitched.

=== New York Mets ===
On July 25, 2025, the Orioles traded Soto to the New York Mets for minor league pitchers Wellington Aracena and Cameron Foster. In 25 appearances for New York, Soto compiled a 1–3 record and 4.50 ERA with 26 strikeouts over 24 innings of work.

=== Pittsburgh Pirates ===
On December 16, 2025, Soto signed a one-year, $7.75 million contract with the Pittsburgh Pirates.

== Pitch selection ==
Soto is mainly a two-pitch pitcher. He throws a sinking two-seam fastball in the 94–99-mile-per-hour (151–159 km/h) range, topping out at 101 miles per hour (163 km/h), and a slider in the 86–93-mile-per-hour (138–150 km/h), topping out at 93 miles per hour (150 km/h). He also throws an occasional four-seam fastball that averages 96–99 miles per hour (154–159 km/h).
