= Kyle Funkhouser =

American baseball player (born 1994)

Free agent
- Pitcher
- Born: March 16, 1994 (age 32); Palos Heights, Illinois, U.S.
- Bats: Right Throws: Right

MLB debut
- July 27, 2020, for the Detroit Tigers

MLB statistics (through 2021 season)
- Win–loss record: 8–5
- Earned run average: 4.20
- Strikeouts: 75
- Stats at Baseball Reference

Teams
- Detroit Tigers (2020–2021)

Kyle James Funkhouser (born March 16, 1994) is an American professional baseball pitcher who is a free agent. He played college baseball for the Louisville Cardinals, and was drafted by the Detroit Tigers with the 115th overall selection in the 2016 MLB draft. He has previously played in Major League Baseball (MLB) for the Tigers.

== Amateur career ==
Funkhouser attended Oak Forest High School in Oak Forest, Illinois. As a senior, he was the Illinois Gatorade Baseball Player of the Year after going 11–2 with a 0.65 earned run average (ERA) and 132 strikeouts. He finished his career with school records in wins, strikeouts, ERA and innings pitched. Funkhouser was also on the school's football and basketball teams.

As a freshman at the University of Louisville in 2013, Funkhouser appeared in 22 games for the Louisville Cardinals baseball team, with six starts. He finished the year 5–1 with a 2.14 ERA and 55 strikeouts in 54 2/3 innings. For his play he was named a freshman All-American by Louisville Slugger. After the 2013 season, he played collegiate summer baseball with the Chatham Anglers of the Cape Cod Baseball League. As a sophomore in 2014, Funkhouser started 18 games, finishing with a school record and NCAA Division I tying 13 wins. He also had a 1.94 ERA and 122 strikeouts. After the season, he was named a first team All-American by the American Baseball Coaches Association (ABCA). During the summer he played for the United States collegiate national team.

Funkhouser was selected by the Los Angeles Dodgers with the 35th overall pick in the 2015 Major League Baseball draft. He opted not to sign with the Dodgers, returning to Louisville for his senior year. He reportedly turned down a signing bonus of $1.75 million.

After posting a 9–3 record with a 3.86 ERA and 95 strikeouts in 93 1/3 innings as a senior, Funkhouser was selected by the Detroit Tigers in the 2016 Major League Baseball draft. He was selected in the fourth round, the 115th overall selection.

== Professional career ==
=== Detroit Tigers ===
Funkhouser signed with the Tigers, receiving a reported $750,000 signing bonus. He made his professional debut on June 27, 2016, playing for the Connecticut Tigers of the Low-A New York-Penn League; he spent the whole season with the Tigers, playing in 13 games and pitching to an 0–2 record and 2.65 ERA.

Funkhouser began the 2017 season with the West Michigan Whitecaps of the Single-A Midwest League, winning his first game on April 7. The Tigers promoted him to the Lakeland Flying Tigers of the High-A Florida State League in May. In 12 games started between both teams, he posted a 5–2 record and 2.44 ERA with 83 strikeouts in 62 2/3 total innings. Funkhouser began the 2018 season with the Erie SeaWolves of the Double-A Eastern League, and earned a midseason promotion to the Toledo Mud Hens of the Triple-A International League. In 19 starts for the two affiliates, he posted a combined 4–7 record and 3.96 ERA with 96 strikeouts across 97 2/3 innings pitched. On July 24, 2018, Funkhouser was ruled out for the remainder of the season after turning his ankle on an uneven sidewalk. In 2019, Funkhouser made 23 starts split between Lakeland, Erie, and Toledo, accumulating a 6–8 record and 6.36 ERA with 98 strikeouts over 92 innings of work.

Funkhouser was added to the Tigers' 40-man roster following the 2019 season, in order to be protected from the Rule 5 draft. On July 27, 2020, Funkhouser made his MLB debut. He earned his first major league win on September 6, 2020, against the Minnesota Twins. With the 2020 Detroit Tigers, Funkhouser appeared in 13 games, compiling a 1–1 record with 7.27 ERA and 12 strikeouts in 17.1 innings pitched.

In 2021, Funkhouser appeared most of the season in middle relief for the Tigers. He earned his first career save on September 19 against the Tampa Bay Rays. Overall in 2021, Funkhouser made 57 appearances (55 in relief), posting a 7–4 record and 3.42 ERA, while striking out 63 batters in 68 1/3 innings.

On April 6, 2022, the Tigers announced Funkhouser would start the 2022 season on the 10-day injured list with a right shoulder strain. On April 23, Funkhouser was moved to the 60-day injured list. On July 23, it was announced that would miss the entire season after it was revealed he required surgery to address the injury. On November 15, Funkhouser was designated for assignment by the Tigers. Three days later, Funkhouser was non-tendered and became a free agent.

=== Texas Rangers ===
On January 5, 2023, Funkhouser signed a minor league contract with the Texas Rangers organization. He made five scoreless appearances for the Double-A Frisco RoughRiders, striking out five batters across four innings. Funkhouser elected free agency following the season on November 6.

=== Guerreros de Oaxaca ===
On April 22, 2025, Funkhouser signed with the Guerreros de Oaxaca of the Mexican League. In seven appearances (four starts) for Oaxaca, Funkhouser logged a 1–1 record and 4.50 ERA with 24 strikeouts over 26 innings of work.

=== Los Angeles Dodgers ===
On May 28, 2025, Funkhouser signed a minor league contract with the Los Angeles Dodgers. He pitched in 17 games, making 12 starts, for the Triple-A Oklahoma City Comets, posting a 2–5 record and 6.03 ERA with 56 strikeouts. Funkhouser elected free agency following the season on November 6.

=== Guerreros de Oaxaca (second stint) ===
On April 14, 2026, Funkhouser signed with the Guerreros de Oaxaca of the Mexican League. He made one start for Oaxaca, allowing five runs on four hits with three strikeouts across 2 2/3 innings pitched.

=== Texas Rangers (second stint) ===
On April 24, 2026, Funkhouser signed a minor league contract with the Texas Rangers. In one start for the Triple–A Round Rock Express, he threw 3 2/3 scoreless innings with more walks (four) than strikeouts (three). Funkhouser was released by the Rangers organization on July 17.
