= Michael Fulmer =

American baseball player (born 1993)

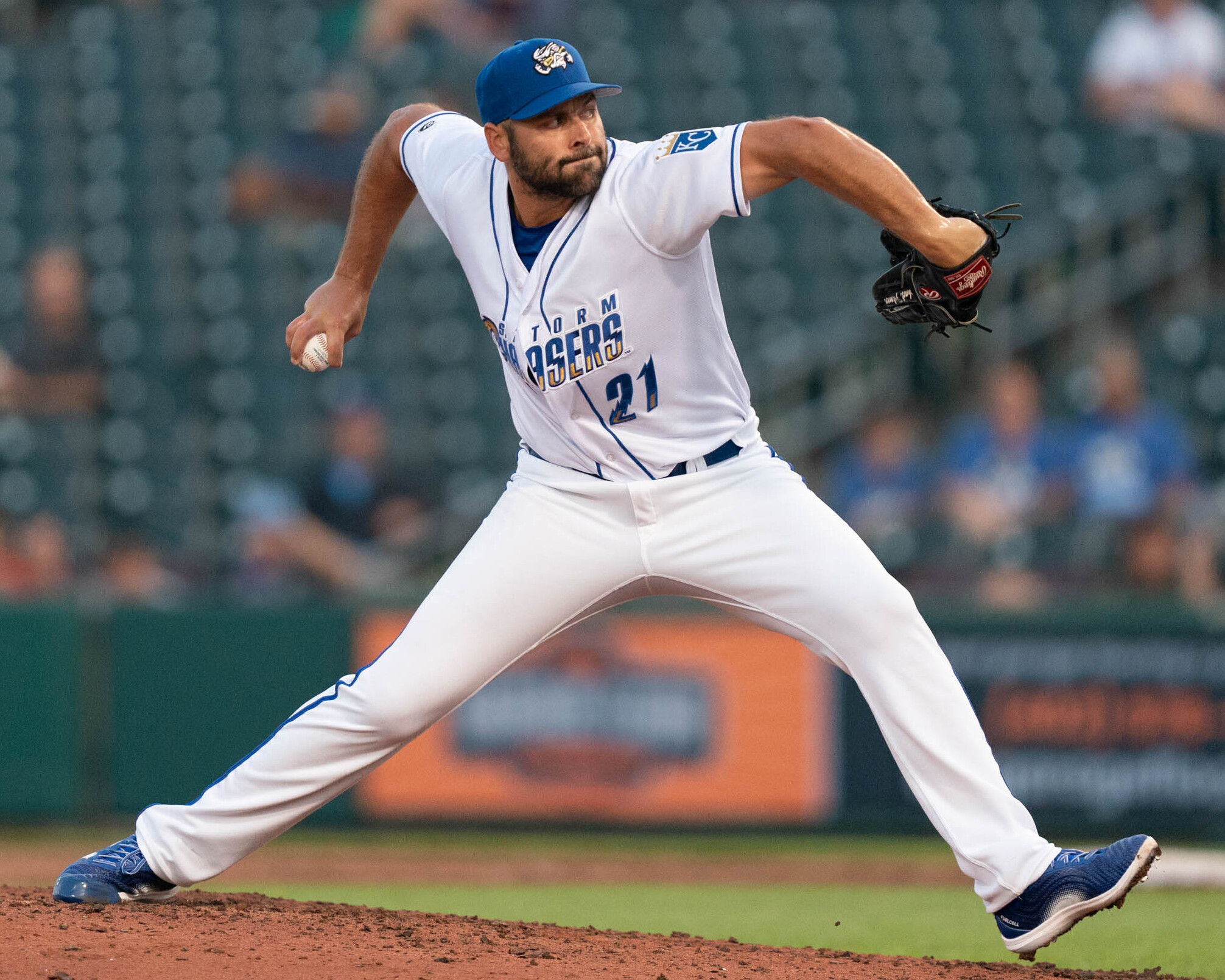
- Fulmer with the Omaha Storm Chasers in 2025

Free agent
- Pitcher
- Born: March 15, 1993 (age 33); Oklahoma City, Oklahoma, U.S.
- Bats: Right Throws: Right

MLB debut
- April 29, 2016, for the Detroit Tigers

MLB statistics (through 2026 season)
- Win–loss record: 37–51
- Earned run average: 3.93
- Strikeouts: 596
- Stats at Baseball Reference

Teams
- Detroit Tigers (2016–2018, 2020–2022); Minnesota Twins (2022); Chicago Cubs (2023); Boston Red Sox (2025); Chicago Cubs (2025); Los Angeles Angels (2026); New York Yankees (2026)

Career highlights and awards
- All-Star (2017); AL Rookie of the Year (2016)
Medals
Men's baseball
Representing United States
World Baseball Classic
Gold medal – first place	2017 Los Angeles	Team

Michael Joseph Fulmer (born March 15, 1993) is an American professional baseball pitcher who is a free agent. He has played in Major League Baseball (MLB) for the Detroit Tigers, Minnesota Twins, Chicago Cubs, Boston Red Sox, Los Angeles Angels, and New York Yankees. Fulmer won the American League Rookie of the Year Award in 2016, and was an All-Star in 2017.

== Career ==
=== Amateur career ===
Fulmer attended Deer Creek High School in Edmond, Oklahoma. As a senior, he went 10–2 with a 0.72 earned run average (ERA), 127 strikeouts and also hit .436 with six home runs. Fulmer committed to play college baseball for the Arkansas Razorbacks.

=== New York Mets ===
The New York Mets selected Fulmer in the first round of the 2011 Major League Baseball draft. He made his professional debut that season with the rookie league Gulf Coast Mets, where he had a 0–1 record with a 10.13 ERA and 10 strikeouts in four appearances, three of them starts.

Fulmer started 21 games for the Savannah Sand Gnats in 2012. He went 7–6 during the year with a 2.74 ERA and 101 strikeouts over 108 1/3 innings. Prior to the 2013 season, Fulmer was ranked by Baseball America as the Mets' seventh best prospect. He pitched in only nine games that season between the rookie league Gulf Coast Mets and the class A advanced St. Lucie Mets due to injuries. He finished the year with a 3.33 ERA and a 3–3 record with 42 strikeouts. Fulmer started 2014 with St. Lucie and finished the year with the Double-A Binghamton Mets. He started 20 games, going 6–11 with a 4.38 ERA and 87 strikeouts.

=== Detroit Tigers ===
On July 31, 2015, the Mets traded Fulmer and Luis Cessa to the Detroit Tigers for Yoenis Céspedes. Fulmer was named the Eastern League Pitcher of the Week for the week ending August 9, 2015. He started two games for the double A Erie SeaWolves during that time and had a 2–0 record with 11 strikeouts and a 0.00 ERA. He led the league in strikeouts (11) and tied for the lead in wins (2) and ERA (0.00). On August 28, 2015, Fulmer was named the Eastern League Pitcher of the Year, and was named as the starting pitcher on the Eastern League All-Star team. Fulmer finished the season 10–3 with a 2.24 ERA and 125 strikeouts in 22 starts for Erie and Binghamton. The Tigers added him to their 40-man roster after the season.

==== 2016 ====
On March 18, 2016, the Tigers optioned Fulmer to the Triple-A Toledo Mud Hens. Fulmer was called up and made his major league debut on April 29, against the Minnesota Twins. Fulmer earned the win in his debut, allowing two earned runs over five innings and striking out four in a 9–2 Tigers victory. On May 21, Fulmer had his first home start at Comerica Park in Detroit, where he gave up just one earned run and recorded 11 strikeouts over seven innings, defeating the Tampa Bay Rays. Fulmer became the first Detroit Tigers rookie pitcher to strike out 11 opposing batters in one game since Pat Underwood in 1979. On June 1, Fulmer no-hit the Los Angeles Angels of Anaheim for 6 2/3 innings before surrendering a two-out single in the 7th to C. J. Cron. He wound up allowing two hits and no runs over 7 2/3 innings. On June 6, Fulmer pitched six scoreless innings, while allowing only two hits against the Toronto Blue Jays. Fulmer became the first pitcher in Tigers history to pitch three consecutive scoreless outings of six innings or more while allowing three or fewer hits.

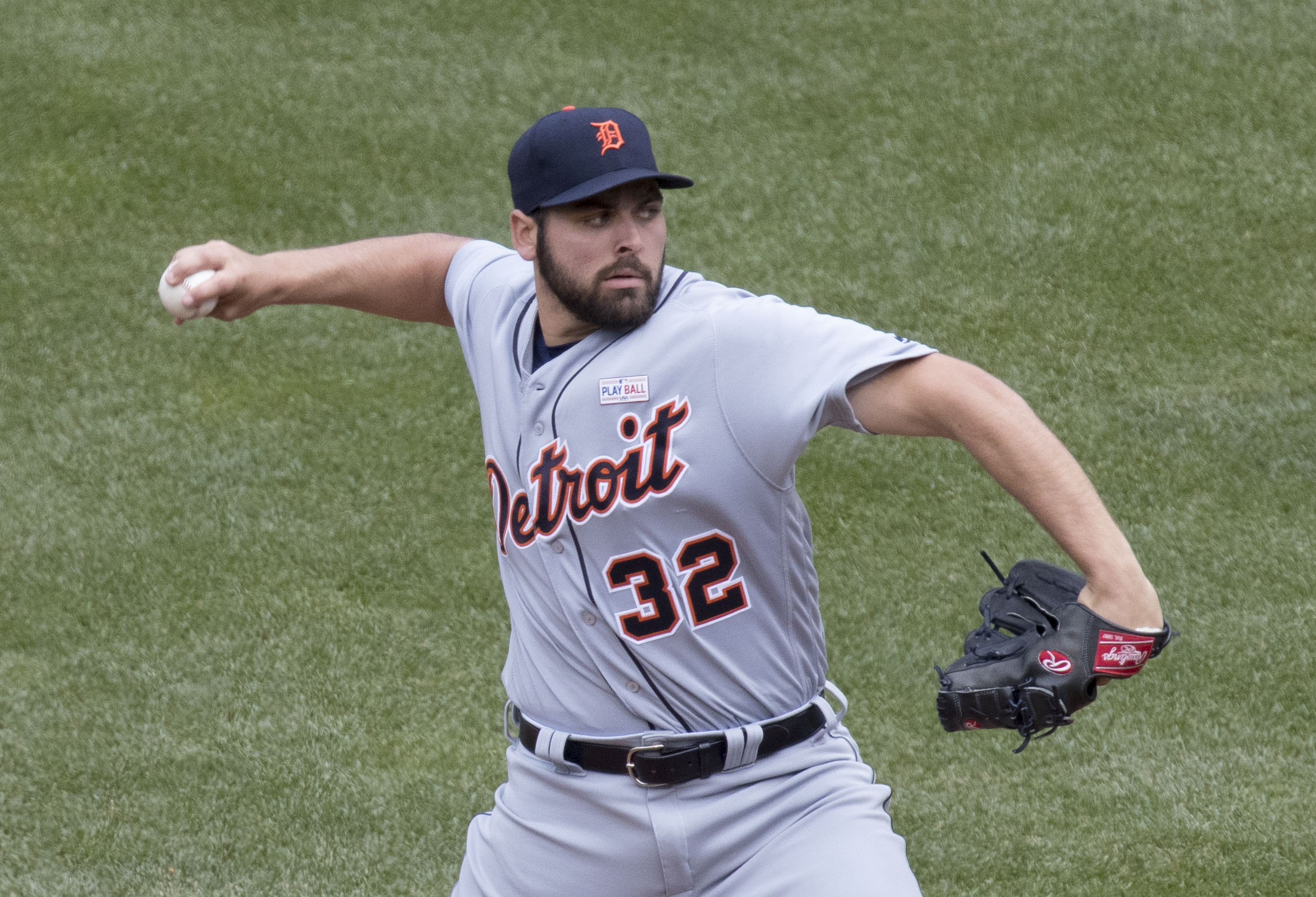
Fulmer pitching against the Baltimore Orioles in 2016.

On June 12, Fulmer pitched six scoreless innings, while allowing only two hits against the New York Yankees. Fulmer became just the second pitcher in Major League history to pitch four consecutive scoreless outings of six innings or more while allowing three or fewer hits, joining Jake Arrieta. On June 17, Fulmer's scoreless streak ended at 33 1/3 innings, surpassing the previous Tiger rookie record of 28 2/3 scoreless innings set by John Hiller in 1967. This was also the longest consecutive scoreless innings streak by a rookie pitcher in baseball since Orel Hershiser threw 32 scoreless innings in 1984, but fell short of the all-time rookie record of 35 consecutive scoreless innings set by Fernando Valenzuela in 1981. On July 1, Fulmer pitched seven scoreless innings against the Tampa Bay Rays, allowing only two hits and striking out ten. Fulmer became the first Tigers pitcher since at least 1913 to allow one or zero runs in eight consecutive starts.

On August 14, Fulmer recorded his first career major league complete game and first career shutout against the Texas Rangers. He finished the 2016 season with an 11–7 record, 3.06 ERA, 1.12 WHIP, and 132 strikeouts in 159 innings pitched. He had the lowest left on base percentage of all major league pitchers, stranding 65.6% of base runners.

Following the conclusion of the season, Fulmer was named the Sporting News AL Rookie of the Year, as voted on by a panel of players, finishing ahead of Tyler Naquin and Gary Sánchez, and was named the Major League Baseball Players Association Players Choice Award for AL Outstanding Rookie. Fulmer was also awarded the Baseball Writers' Association of America AL Rookie of the Year Award, receiving 26 of 30 first-place votes.

==== 2017 ====
For the first half of the 2017 season, Fulmer went 9–6 with a 3.19 ERA and 13 quality starts, earning him his first American League All-Star selection. On August 3, he was placed on the 10-day disabled list due to right elbow ulnar neuritis. An MRI revealed no ligament damage. Fulmer was reactivated from the DL on August 14. On September 11, it was announced that Fulmer would undergo elbow surgery for ulnar nerve transposition, ending his season. He finished 2017 with a 10–12 record, 3.83 ERA, 1.15 WHIP, and 114 strikeouts in 164 2/3 innings.

==== 2018 ====
After pitching to a 3–9 record, with a 4.50 ERA prior to the 2018 All-Star break, Fulmer was placed on the 10-day disabled list July 20 with a left oblique strain. In his final start of the season on September 15, against the Cleveland Indians, he left the game without recording an out, after allowing two home runs on five pitches. On September 20, Fullmer underwent surgery on a torn meniscus in his right knee. He finished the 2018 season with a 3–12 record, with a 4.69 ERA, 1.31 WHIP and 110 strikeouts in 132 1/3 innings. His ERA, WHIP and hits allowed per nine innings (8.7) were all career highs.

==== 2019 ====
On February 15, 2019, the Tigers signed Fulmer to a one-year, $2.8 million contract following a salary arbitration hearing. On March 19, the Tigers announced that they had recommended season-ending Tommy John surgery for Fulmer after he experienced elbow pain during a bullpen session. On March 20, Fulmer revealed that he would undergo the Tommy John surgery and miss the entire 2019 season.

==== 2020 ====
On January 6, 2020, the Tigers signed Fulmer to a one-year, $2.8 million contract to avoid arbitration. Fulmer was medically cleared to be a full participant in the Tigers' delayed (July) spring training for the 2020 season. Fulmer was named to the Tigers opening day roster on July 23. He served in an "opener" role, pitching approximately three innings per start until he built up to more pitches. With the 2020 Detroit Tigers, Fulmer appeared in 10 games, compiling a 0–2 record with 8.78 ERA and 20 strikeouts in 27 2/3 innings pitched.

==== 2021 ====
On January 12, 2021, the Tigers and Fulmer agreed to a one-year, $3.1 million contract, avoiding arbitration. On March 26, Tigers manager A. J. Hinch announced that Fulmer would start the 2021 season in the bullpen. Following an injury to Julio Teherán, Fulmer was added back to the starting rotation. He won his first 2021 start on April 14, allowing two runs and three hits over five innings as the Tigers defeated the Houston Astros, 6–4. Fulmer was soon returned to the bullpen, and recorded his first career save in an extra-innings win over the Boston Red Sox on May 6. Overall in 2021, Fulmer appeared in 52 games (48 in relief), posting a 5–6 record, 2.97 ERA, 14 saves, 21 games finished and 73 strikeouts in 69 2/3 innings.

==== 2022 ====
On March 22, 2022, Fulmer signed a one-year, $4.95 million contract with the Tigers, avoiding arbitration.

=== Minnesota Twins ===
On August 2, 2022, Fulmer was traded to the Minnesota Twins for pitcher Sawyer Gipson-Long. He made 26 appearances for Minnesota down the stretch, posting a 2–2 record and 3.70 ERA with 22 strikeouts in 24 1/3 innings pitched.

=== Chicago Cubs ===
On February 20, 2023, Fulmer signed a one-year, $4 million contract with the Chicago Cubs. In 58 appearances for Chicago, Fulmer registered a 3–5 record and 4.42 ERA with 65 strikeouts and two saves in 57 innings of work. Following the season on October 19, it was announced that Fulmer had undergone UCL revision surgery and would likely miss the entire 2024 season as a result. He became a free agent following the 2023 season.

=== Boston Red Sox ===
On February 8, 2024, Fulmer signed a two-year, minor league contract with the Boston Red Sox.

Fulmer returned to action in 2025, beginning the year with the Triple-A Worcester Red Sox. On April 13, 2025, Boston selected Fulmer's contract, adding him to their active roster. The following day he made his Red Sox debut, allowing 3 runs in 2 2/3 innings against the Tampa Bay Rays. Fulmer was designated for assignment by Boston on April 18. He elected free agency after clearing waivers on April 20.

=== Chicago Cubs (second stint) ===
On April 23, 2025, Fulmer signed a minor league contract with the Chicago Cubs. He was designated for assignment on June 26 to make room on the active roster for the returning Shota Imanaga. He cleared waivers and was sent outright to the Triple-A Iowa Cubs on June 29, but elected free agency the following day.

=== Kansas City Royals ===
On July 3, 2025, Fulmer signed a minor league contract with the Kansas City Royals. In 15 appearances for the Triple-A Omaha Storm Chasers, he struggled to an 0–1 record and 5.89 ERA with 18 strikeouts and three saves across 18 1/3 innings pitched. Fulmer was released by the Royals on August 16.

=== Seattle Mariners ===
On August 19, 2025, Fulmer signed a minor league contract with the Seattle Mariners. He made 12 appearances for the Triple-A Tacoma Rainiers, recording an 0.75 ERA with 18 strikeouts and one save over 12 innings of work. Fulmer elected free agency following the season on November 6.

=== San Francisco Giants ===
On February 4, 2026, Fulmer signed a minor league contract with the San Francisco Giants. He made 37 appearances for the Triple–A Sacramento River Cats, compiling a 4–2 record and 2.98 ERA with 52 strikeouts and 10 saves across 42 1/3 innings pitched. Fulmer was released by the Giants on August 4.

=== Los Angeles Angels ===
On August 11, 2026, Fulmer signed a minor league contract with the Los Angeles Angels. After one scoreless relief appearance with the Triple-A Salt Lake Bees, the Angels selected Fulmer's contract to the 40-man roster and promoted him to the major leagues on August 15. He made three scoreless appearances for Los Angeles, recording four strikeouts over 3 2/3 innings pitched. Fulmer was designated for assignment by the Angels on August 23. On August 25, Fulmer cleared waivers and became a free agent.

=== New York Yankees ===
On August 26, 2026, Fulmer signed a major league contract with the New York Yankees.

== Pitching style ==
Fulmer throws hard four-seam and two-seam fastballs that average 94–97 miles per hour (151–156 km/h) (topping out at 99 miles per hour (159 km/h)). His offspeed pitches include a slider in the 88–93 miles per hour (142–150 km/h) (topping out at 95 miles per hour (153 km/h)) range, and a changeup that averages 85–88 miles per hour (137–142 km/h) (topping out at 91 miles per hour (146 km/h)). After struggling to a 6.52 ERA in his first four major league starts, Fulmer made an effort to throw more changeups. It became a very effective pitch for the rest of the 2016 season, with opponents hitting the pitch at only a .167 clip. In 2017, he started to throw a knuckle curve, averaging 77–80 MPH, which he had formerly thrown in high school. In 2021, Fulmer began adding velocity to his slider, throwing it at an average of 91 MPH.

== Personal life ==
Fulmer married girlfriend Kelsey Miles in January 2016. He works as a plumber's assistant during the offseason.
