= Akil Baddoo =

American baseball player (born 1998)

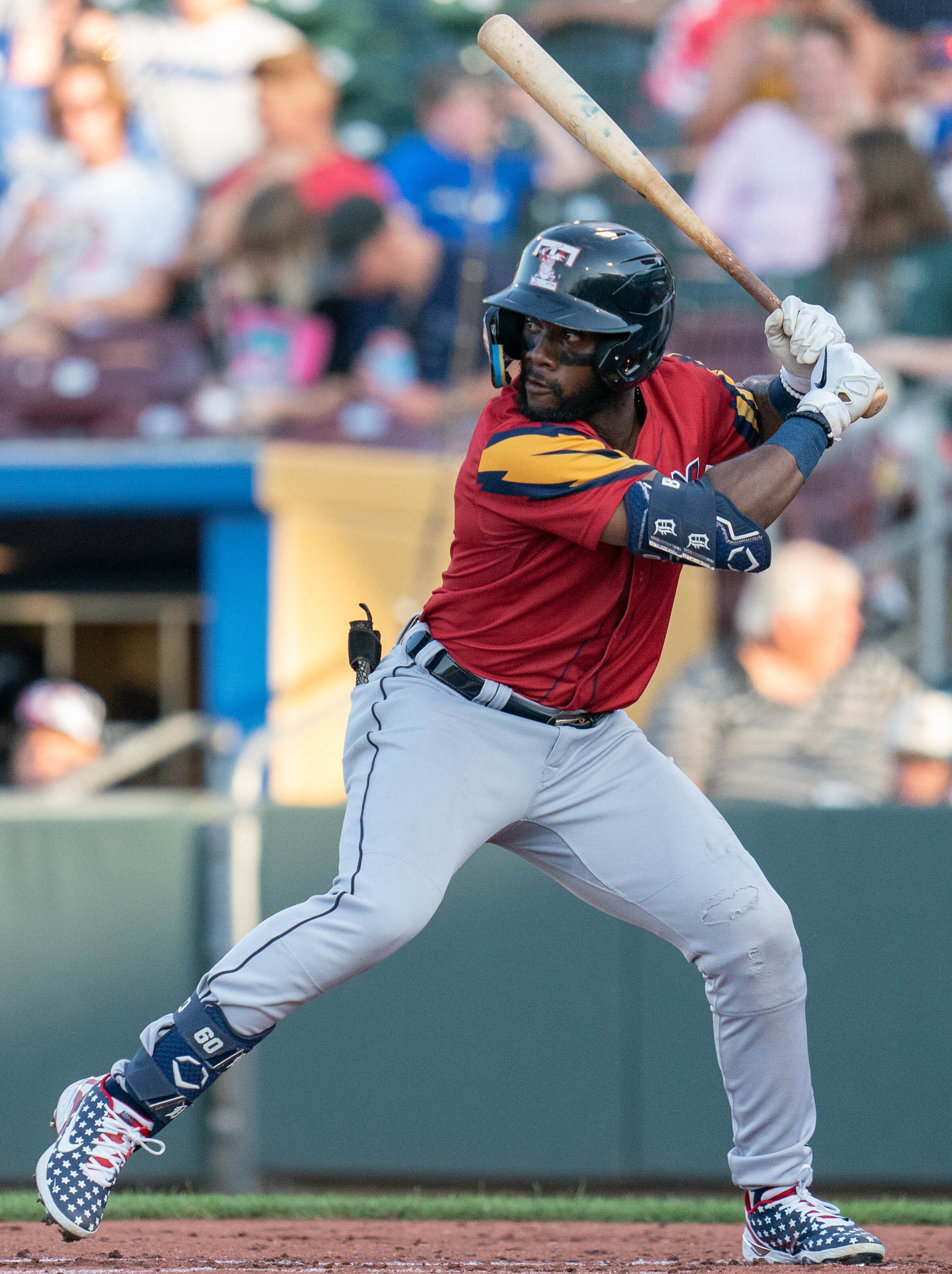
- Baddoo with the Toledo Mud Hens in 2022

Pittsburgh Pirates
- Outfielder
- Born: August 16, 1998 (age 28); Silver Spring, Maryland, U.S.
- Bats: Left Throws: Left

MLB debut
- April 4, 2021, for the Detroit Tigers

MLB statistics (through 2025 season)
- Batting average: .224
- Home runs: 28
- Runs batted in: 104
- Stolen bases: 43
- Stats at Baseball Reference

Teams
- Detroit Tigers (2021–2025)

Akil Neomon Baddoo (born August 16, 1998) is an American professional baseball outfielder for the Pittsburgh Pirates of Major League Baseball (MLB). He has previously played in MLB for the Detroit Tigers.

== Early life ==
Baddoo was born in Silver Spring, Maryland, to parents John and Akilah. His father's family is originally from Ghana and his mother's family is from Trinidad and Tobago. He was educated and played varsity baseball at Salem High School in Conyers, Georgia.

== Career ==
=== Minnesota Twins ===
The Minnesota Twins chose Baddoo in the second round, with the 74th overall selection, of the 2016 Major League Baseball draft. After two seasons in Twins' rookie leagues with the Gulf Coast League Twins and Elizabethton Twins, he was assigned to the Single–A Cedar Rapids Kernels for the 2018 season. In 113 games, Baddoo batted .243/.352/.419 with 11 home runs, 40 RBI, and 24 stolen bases.

Baddoo moved up to the High–A Fort Myers Miracle for the 2019 season, but played only 29 games before requiring Tommy John surgery on his left elbow. The injury and cancellation of the minor league season as a result of the COVID-19 pandemic contributed to Baddoo playing in no games in 2020.

=== Detroit Tigers ===
On December 10, 2020, the Detroit Tigers selected Baddoo with the third pick in the Rule 5 draft. Baddoo made the team's 2021 Opening Day roster after hitting .325 with five home runs in the spring training season.

He made his major league debut on April 4, hitting a home run in his first at-bat, on the first pitch he saw from Cleveland Indians starter Aaron Civale. Baddoo became the ninth player in Tigers' franchise history to hit a home run in his first major league at-bat, and only the second to do so on the first pitch, following George Vico, who accomplished the feat in 1948. The following day, Baddoo hit his first career grand slam off of Randy Dobnak of the Minnesota Twins. He became the first player in franchise history to hit a home run in his first two career games and the first player in MLB history to do so from the ninth spot in the batting order.

On April 6, Baddoo recorded his first career walk-off hit, a tenth-inning RBI single off of Twins closer Hansel Robles to give the Tigers a 4–3 victory. He became the first Tiger with a walk-off hit within his first three major league games since Gabe Alvarez in 1998 and the first MLB player since at least 1900 with two homers, including a grand slam, and a walk-off hit in his first three career games. On April 13, Baddoo recorded his fourth home run of the season. He became the first player in franchise history to post four homers and 10 RBIs within his first eight games, and the first major league player to do so since Kyle Lewis in 2019. He also became the first Tigers' player since Don Ross in 1938, and the sixth player in MLB history, to drive in a run in at least six of his first eight career games.

On August 11, Baddoo was placed on the 7-day concussion protocol injured list, following a collision with center fielder Derek Hill the previous night. Baddoo was activated off the injured list on August 23. Baddoo finished the 2021 season hitting .259 with 13 home runs and 55 RBI, while stealing 18 bases in 22 attempts. Baddoo earned the Detroit Tigers-Detroit Sports Media Association 2021 Rookie of the Year award.

Baddoo made the 2022 Opening day roster and began the season as the Tigers' center fielder. On May 9, he was sent down to Triple-A Toledo Mud Hens after posting a .140 average. After hitting .300 with a .405 on-base percentage in 30 games with Toledo, he was recalled to the Tigers on July 11. He finished the season hitting .204 with 2 home runs.

Baddoo was optioned to Toledo to begin the 2023 season, and was called up on April 8, after Austin Meadows was placed on the 10-day injured list. He played in 112 games for Detroit, batting .218/.310/.372 with 11 home runs, 34 RBI, and 14 stolen bases.

Baddoo was again optioned to Triple–A Toledo to begin the 2024 season. In 31 games for Detroit, he batted .137/.220/.301 with two home runs, five RBI, and one stolen base. Baddoo was designated for assignment following the signing of Alex Cobb on December 10, 2024. He cleared waivers and was sent outright to Toledo on December 17.

On February 20, 2025, Baddoo underwent surgery to repair a hamate hook fracture in his right hand, necessitating a recovery of at least 4-to-8 weeks. After returning from the injury, he batted .245 with seven home runs and 15 RBI across 28 games for Toledo and the Single-A Lakeland Flying Tigers. On May 14, the Tigers selected Baddoo's contract, adding him to their active roster. In seven appearances for Detroit, he went 2-for-17 (.118) with one RBI and one stolen base. Baddoo was designated for assignment by the Tigers on June 6. He cleared waivers and accepted an outright assignment to Triple-A Toledo on June 10. Baddoo elected free agency on October 14.

=== Milwaukee Brewers ===
On December 11, 2025, Baddoo signed a one-year contract with the Milwaukee Brewers. On March 24, 2026, Baddoo was placed on the 60-day injured list due to a left quad strain. On May 24, the Brewers activated Baddoo and optioned him to the Triple-A Nashville Sounds. He made 64 appearances for Nashville, batting .252/.342/.469 with 11 home runs, 47 RBI, and seven stolen bases.

=== Pittsburgh Pirates ===
On November 2, 2026, Baddoo was claimed off of waivers by the Pittsburgh Pirates.

== See also ==
- List of Major League Baseball players with a home run in their first major league at bat
- Rule 5 draft results
