= George Vico =

American baseball player (1923–1994)

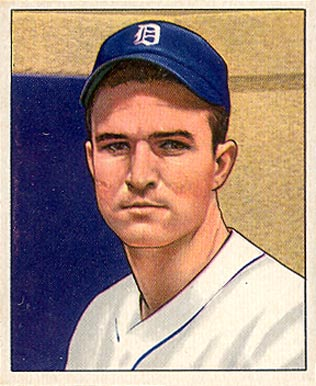
- George Vico 1950 Bowman baseball card
- First baseman
- Born: August 9, 1923; San Fernando, California, U.S.
- Died: January 14, 1994 (aged 70); Redondo Beach, California, U.S.
- Batted: Left Threw: Right

MLB debut
- April 20, 1948, for the Detroit Tigers

Last MLB appearance
- October 1, 1949, for the Detroit Tigers

MLB statistics
- Batting average: .250
- Home runs: 12
- Runs batted in: 76
- Stats at Baseball Reference

Teams
- Detroit Tigers (1948–1949)

George Steve Vico (August 9, 1923 – January 14, 1994), nicknamed "Sam", was an American professional baseball player from 1941 to 1957 who spent two years in the major leagues with the Detroit Tigers (1948–1949).

== Career ==
Born in San Fernando, California, Vico was a first baseman. Before reaching the major leagues, Vico played for the Fulton Tigers, Muskegon Reds, and Winston-Salem Twins in 1941 and 1942. His career was interrupted for three seasons (1943–1945) as he served in the U.S. Navy during World War II. After the war, Vico played for the Salem Senators and Portland Beavers.

In 1948, Vico made it to the major leagues with the Detroit Tigers. In his first at bat in the major leagues on April 20, Vico hit a home run off Joe Haynes on the first pitch he faced. Vico had another impressive game on August 14, when he collected 7 RBIs, 2 doubles, a triple and a home run. (If Vico had held up on his second double, he could have hit for the cycle.) Vico was the Tigers' starting first baseman in 1948, playing in 144 games and batting .267 with 139 hits, 23 doubles, 9 triples and 8 home runs. As a rookie, Vico was among the 1948 American League leaders with 9 triples (9th in AL), 7 times hit by a pitch (2nd in AL), 17 sacrifice hits (4th in AL), and 23 times grounded into a double play (2nd in AL).

Vico also had a good season as a fielder in 1948. His range factor of 8.83 was 1.79 points higher than the average first baseman that year. He had 1,165 putouts, 85 assists, and 112 double plays.

In 1949, Vico's batting average dropped by 77 points to .190. In 67 games, he had only 15 hits. Vico was sent to the minor league Toledo Mud Hens after the 1949 season. Vico continued to play in the minor leagues until 1957 with the Toledo Mud Hens, Seattle Rainiers, Indianapolis Indians, San Francisco Seals, Sacramento Solons and Hollywood Stars.

Vico had a small uncredited acting part in the 1949 movie The Stratton Story playing the part of the "Detroit Ball Player."

Vico was the son of Serbian immigrants. He died at age 70 in 1994 at Redondo Beach, California, and is buried at United Serbian Cemetery in East Los Angeles, California.

== See also ==
- List of Major League Baseball players with a home run in their first major league at bat
