= Derek Hill (baseball) =

American baseball player (born 1995)

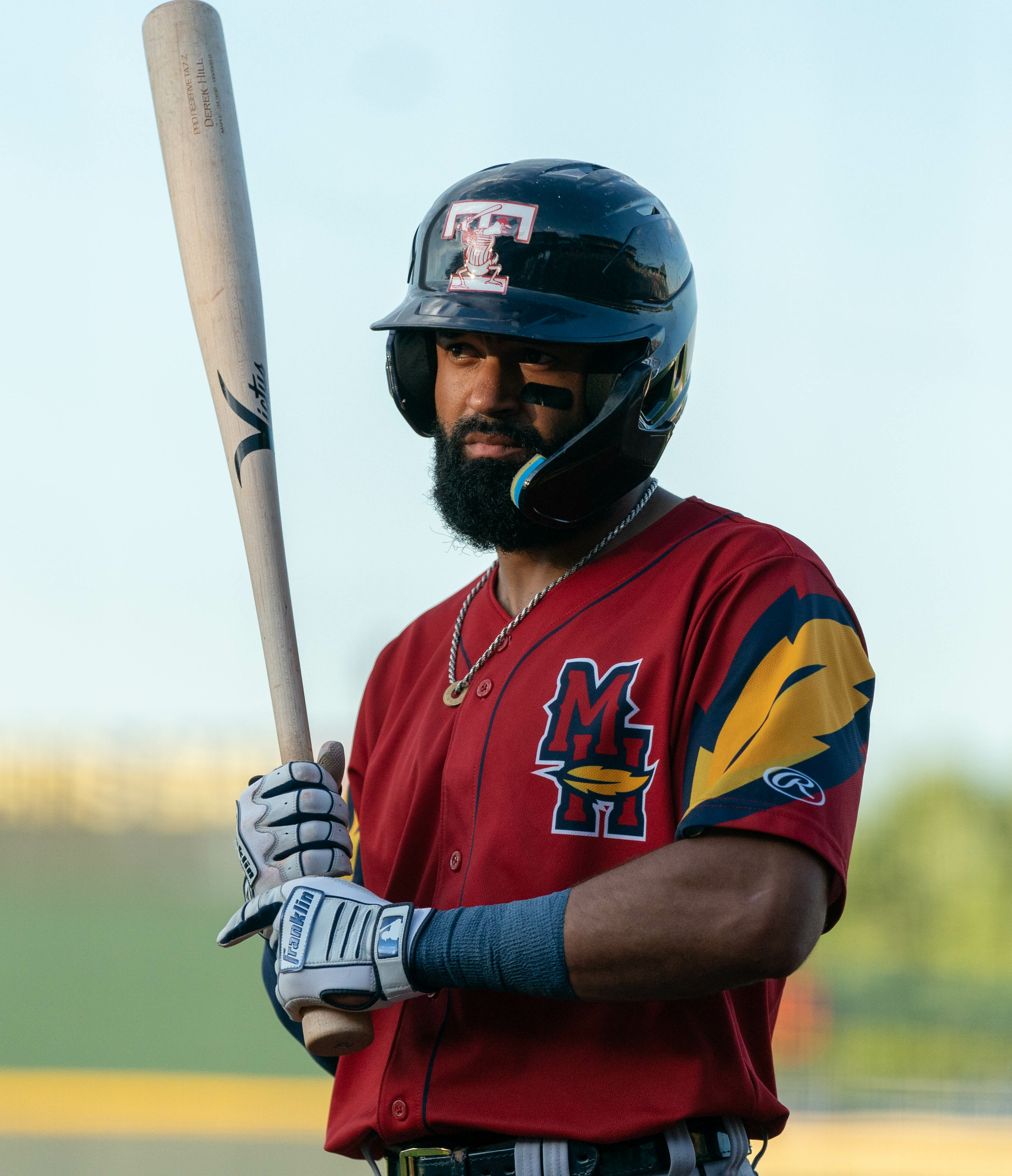
- Hill with the Toledo Mud Hens in 2022

Philadelphia Phillies – No. 49
- Outfielder
- Born: December 30, 1995 (age 30); Des Moines, Iowa, U.S.
- Bats: Right Throws: Right

MLB debut
- September 4, 2020, for the Detroit Tigers

MLB statistics (through 2026 season)
- Batting average: .232
- Home runs: 25
- Runs batted in: 85
- Stats at Baseball Reference

Teams
- Detroit Tigers (2020–2022); Washington Nationals (2023); Texas Rangers (2024); San Francisco Giants (2024); Miami Marlins (2024–2025); Chicago White Sox (2025–2026); Philadelphia Phillies (2026–present)

Derek Jerome Hill (born December 30, 1995) is an American professional baseball outfielder for the Philadelphia Phillies of Major League Baseball (MLB). He has previously played in MLB for the Detroit Tigers, Washington Nationals, Texas Rangers, San Francisco Giants, Miami Marlins, and Chicago White Sox. Hill was drafted by the Tigers in the first round of the 2014 MLB draft.

== Early life ==
Hill grew up in Des Moines, Iowa with his mother and spent his summers with his father in Northern California, where he played baseball for select teams. In 2011, he moved to Sacramento and attended Elk Grove High School in Elk Grove, California. He batted an even .500 (47-for-94) in his senior season, with 11 doubles, seven triples 30 runs batted in (RBI) and 29 stolen bases.

== Professional career ==
=== Detroit Tigers ===
Hill was drafted by the Detroit Tigers in the first round, 23rd overall, in the 2014 Major League Baseball draft. On June 11, the Tigers announced they agreed to terms on a deal with Hill that included a $2 million signing bonus. He was previously committed to play college baseball at the University of Oregon. Hill spent 2014 with both the rookie-level Gulf Coast League Tigers and the Connecticut Tigers, posting a combined .208 batting average with two home runs and 14 RBI in 47 games between both teams. Hill's 2015 season, in which he batted .238 with a .619 OPS and 25 stolen bases while playing for the West Michigan Whitecaps, was limited to only 53 games due to injury. Hill returned to West Michigan in 2016 where he improved, posting a .266 average with one home run, 31 RBI, and 35 stolen bases. In 2017, Hill began the season with West Michigan, and after batting .285 with an .812 OPS, he was promoted to the Lakeland Flying Tigers in late August. He played in only nine games for them in which he batted .194.

Hill was added to the Tigers' 40–man roster following the 2019 season, in order to be protected from the Rule 5 draft. On September 2, 2020, Hill was recalled by the Tigers following a season-ending injury to JaCoby Jones. He made his MLB debut on September 4, 2020, as a defensive replacement. He batted .091 with no home runs or RBI in 15 games for the Tigers in 2020.

Hill began the 2021 season at the Tigers alternate training site in Toledo, and was assigned to the Triple–A Toledo Mud Hens in May. On June 3, Hill was recalled to the major league club following an injury to Victor Reyes. On August 8, Hill hit his first major league home run, a three-run drive to left-center off Zach Plesac of the Cleveland Indians. On August 11, Hill was placed on the 10-day injured list after suffering a left ribcage contusion in a collision with left fielder Akil Baddoo the previous night. In 49 games with the 2021 Tigers, Hill hit .259 with 3 home runs, 14 RBIs, and 6 stolen bases. He had the 3rd-fastest sprint speed of all major leaguers, at 30.5 feet/second.

On April 6, 2022, the Tigers announced Hill would start the 2022 season on the 10-day injured list (retroactive to April 4) with a right hamstring strain. On August 1, 2022, Hill was designated for assignment by the Tigers.

=== Seattle Mariners ===
On August 5, 2022, Hill was claimed off waivers from the Tigers by the Seattle Mariners. Hill was assigned to the Triple–A Tacoma Rainiers. On October 26, Hill was designated for assignment following the waiver claim of Luke Weaver. He cleared waivers and was sent outright to Triple–A Tacoma on October 28. Hill elected free agency following the season on November 10.

=== Washington Nationals ===
On November 14, 2022, Hill signed a minor league deal with the Washington Nationals organization. He was assigned to the Triple–A Rochester Red Wings to begin the 2023 season, where he played in 48 games and hit .324/.381/.533 with 8 home runs, 31 RBI, and 10 stolen bases. On June 21, 2023, Hill's contract was selected to the major league roster following an injury to Víctor Robles. In 13 games for the Nationals, he batted .170/.220/.191 with 1 RBI and 1 stolen base. On July 5, Hill was designated for assignment by Washington. He cleared waivers and was sent outright to Triple–A on July 7. On October 2, Hill elected free agency.

=== Texas Rangers ===
On December 27, 2023, Hill signed a minor league contract with the Texas Rangers. In 34 games for the Triple–A Round Rock Express, he batted .333/.387/.659 with eight home runs, 16 RBI, and 6 stolen bases. On May 21, 2024, Texas selected Hill’s contract and promoted him to the active roster. On June 7, Hill was designated for assignment by the Rangers. He cleared waivers and was sent outright to Round Rock on June 12. On June 26, the Rangers added Hill back to their major league roster. In 16 total games for Texas, he batted .256/.289/.465 with three home runs, five RBI, and two stolen bases. Hill was designated for assignment a second time on July 20.

=== San Francisco Giants ===
On July 23, 2024, Hill was claimed off waivers by the San Francisco Giants. In 5 games for the Giants, he went 3–for–12 (.250) with two RBI. Hill was designated for assignment by San Francisco on August 2.

=== Miami Marlins ===
On August 3, 2024, Hill was claimed off waivers by the Miami Marlins. He made 32 appearances for the Marlins down the stretch, batting .234/.259/.402 with four home runs, 18 RBI, and four stolen bases.

Hill made 53 appearances for Miami in 2025, slashing .213/.275/.331 with three home runs, 10 RBI, and seven stolen bases. Hill was designated for assignment by the Marlins on September 22, 2025.

=== Chicago White Sox ===
On September 24, 2025, Hill was claimed off waivers by the Chicago White Sox. He made four appearances down the stretch for Chicago, going 2-for-7 (.286) with one RBI.

Hill made 50 appearances for the White Sox in 2026, slashing .213/.284/.375 with four home runs, eight RBI, and seven stolen bases.

=== Philadelphia Phillies ===
On June 11, 2026, the White Sox traded Hill and $250,000 in international bonus pool money to the Philadelphia Phillies in exchange for Dylan Campbell and Jose Colmenares. On August 3, Hill hit Philadelphia's first grand slam of the year against Tom Cosgrove of the Washington Nationals, helping the Phillies go from a 3–0 deficit to a winning score of 6–3.

== Personal life ==
Hill's father, Orsino Hill, is a scout for the Los Angeles Dodgers.

Hill married his wife in 2024. They share a daughter.
