= Cristian Santana =

Cristian Santana may refer to:

- Cristian Santana (footballer)
- Cristian Santana (baseball)
