= Max Clark (baseball) =

American baseball player (born 2004)

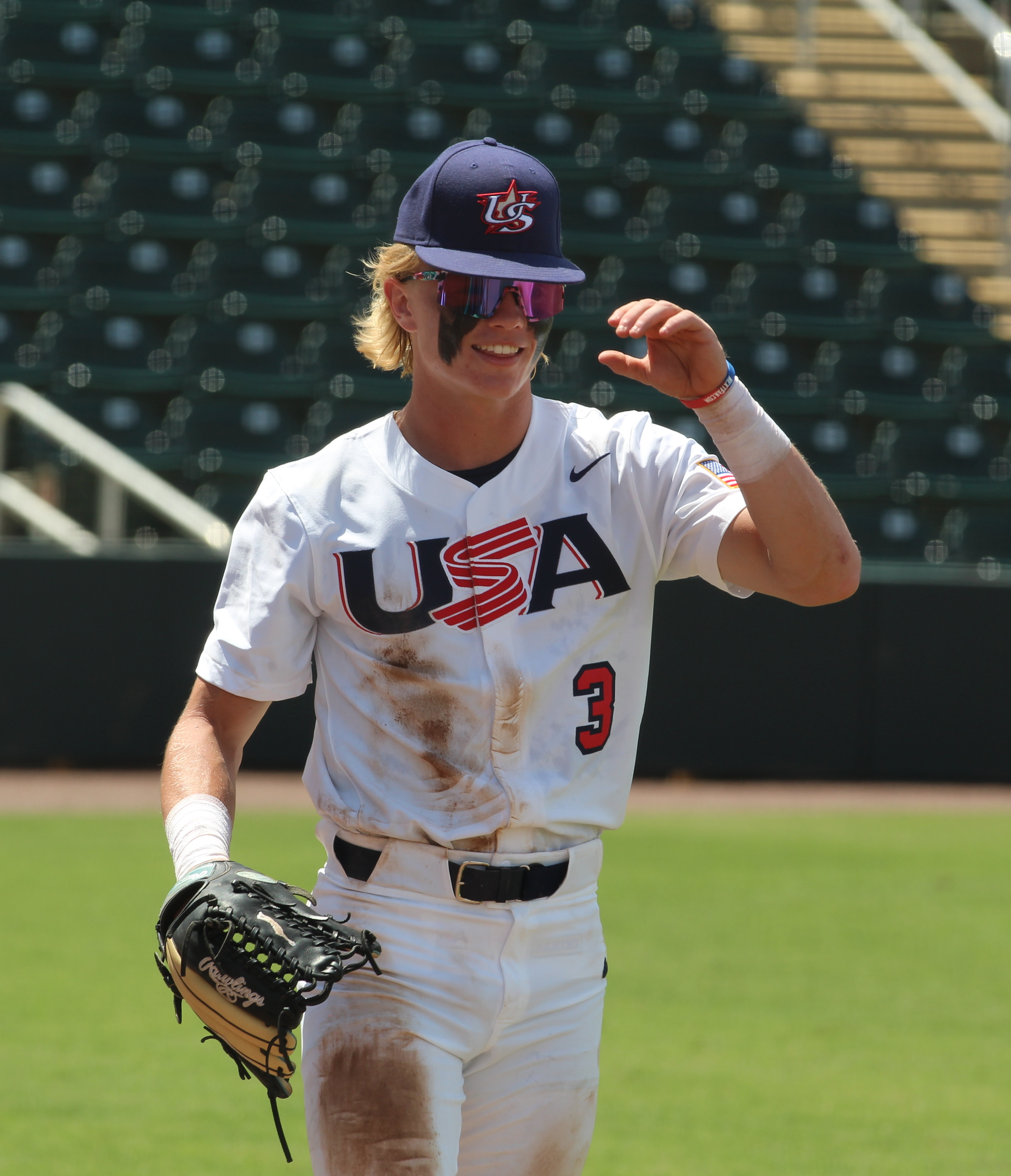
- Clark with Team USA in 2023

Detroit Tigers – No. 15
- Outfielder
- Born: December 21, 2004 (age 21); Franklin, Indiana, U.S.
- Bats: Left Throws: Left

MLB debut
- July 31, 2026, for the Detroit Tigers

MLB statistics (through 2026 season)
- Batting average: .272
- Home runs: 3
- Runs batted in: 23
- Stats at Baseball Reference

Teams
- Detroit Tigers (2026–present)
Medals
Men's baseball
Representing United States
U-18 Baseball World Cup
Gold medal – first place	2022 Sarasota-Bradenton	Team

Maxwell Reece Clark (born December 21, 2004) is an American professional baseball outfielder for the Detroit Tigers of Major League Baseball (MLB). Clark was selected with the third overall pick by the Tigers in the 2023 MLB draft and made his MLB debut in 2026.

== Amateur career ==
Clark began playing baseball as a child in his local Little League before he began playing travel baseball with Franklin Powerhouse and later with the Indiana Bulls, an Indiana travel team featuring alumni such as Scott Rolen, Tucker Barnhart, and Lance Lynn. He committed to play college baseball at Vanderbilt University.

Clark attended Franklin Community High School in Franklin, Indiana, where he played on their baseball team as an outfielder and pitcher. He also played on their football team as a wide receiver. As a sophomore in 2021, he was named the Indiana Gatorade Baseball Player of the Year after batting .450 with six home runs, thirty RBIs, and 31 stolen bases alongside pitching to a 0.84 ERA and 120 strikeouts over fifty innings. As a junior on the football field, he caught 25 passes for 547 yards and four touchdowns.

During his junior year on the baseball team, he batted .577 with nine home runs, 32 RBIs, 31 walks, and 22 stolen bases and was named the Indiana Gatorade Baseball Player of the Year for the second straight season. That summer, he participated in the Prospect Development Pipeline League at the USA Baseball National Training Complex in Cary, North Carolina. He also played for Team USA in the 2021 WBSC U-18 World Cup, helping lead the team to a gold medal with a .294 batting average over eight games, and played in the Perfect Game All-American Classic at Chase Field.

Clark entered his senior year as the top high school draft prospect for the upcoming MLB draft. He finished his senior year batting .646 with six home runs, 33 RBIs, and 45 runs scored, and was named the Gatorade Baseball Player of the Year. He was also awarded the Gatorade Best Player of the Year, as the best high school athlete regardless of sport, joining past winners such as Kyler Murray, Bobby Witt Jr. and LeBron James.

== Professional career ==
=== Minor leagues ===
The Detroit Tigers selected Clark in the first round, with the third overall pick, in the 2023 Major League Baseball draft. On July 17, 2023, Clark signed with the Tigers for a $7.7 million signing bonus.

On July 29, Clark was assigned to the Florida Complex League Tigers, where he made his professional debut against the FCL Yankees, going 1-for-4 with a triple. In his next game on August 1, he hit his first professional home run against the FCL Blue Jays. On August 24, he was promoted to the Single-A Lakeland Flying Tigers. In 23 games between the two teams, Clark batted .224/.383/.376 with two home runs and 19 RBI.

Clark was assigned to Lakeland to begin the 2024 season. He and Hao-Yu Lee were selected to represent the Tigers in the All-Star Futures Game at Globe Life Field. On July 21, Clark was promoted to the High-A West Michigan Whitecaps after batting .286/.386/.421 with seven home runs and 26 stolen bases in 73 games with Lakeland. In 34 games with West Michigan, Clark batted .264 with two home runs, 17 RBI, and ten doubles.

Clark returned to West Michigan to begin the 2025 season. He was selected, alongside Kevin McGonigle and Josue Briceño, to represent the Tigers in the 2025 All-Star Futures Game at Truist Park. On July 7, it was announced that they had been promoted to the Double-A Erie SeaWolves. In 111 games, Clark batted .272 with 14 home runs, 67 RBI, and 19 stolen bases.

Clark was assigned to the Triple-A Toledo Mud Hens to begin the 2026 season. In 90 games, he batted .276 with 11 home runs, 42 RBI, 20 doubles, two triples, and 21 stolen bases in 23 attempts.

=== Major leagues ===
On July 31, 2026, Matt Vierling was placed on the 10-day injured list, and the Tigers selected Clark's contract and promoted him to the major leagues for the first time before their series opener against the Athletics. He was assigned number 15, which had most recently been worn by Zack Short earlier in the season. In his MLB debut, Clark started in center field and batted seventh in the lineup. He drew a walk in his first plate appearance before recording a single against Jeffrey Springs in his first official at-bat in the fourth inning. Clark finished the game 3-for-4 with two doubles and an RBI in a 13–1 victory. He became the fourth Tigers player to record at least three hits in his major league debut, joining teammate Kevin McGonigle, who recorded four hits in his debut earlier that season. In his next game on August 1, Clark hit his first career home run, a two-run homer off Jack Perkins, and finished 2-for-5 in the victory. Clark played in a total of 51 games for Detroit and ended the 2026 season with a .272 batting average, three home runs, 23 RBI, and 11 doubles.
