= Casey Mize =

American baseball player (born 1997)

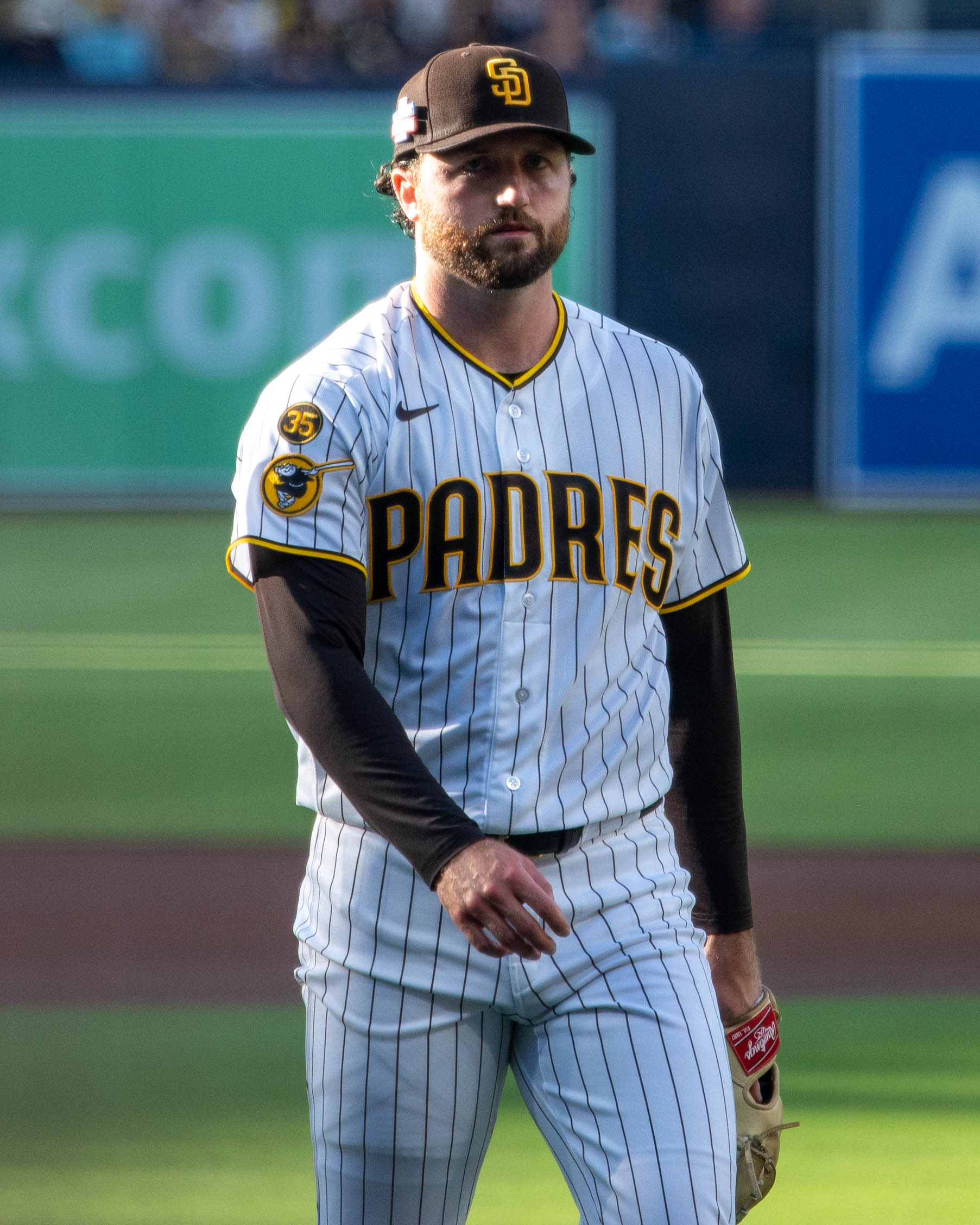
- Mize with the San Diego Padres in 2026

Free agent
- Pitcher
- Born: May 1, 1997 (age 29); Springville, Alabama, U.S.
- Bats: Right Throws: Right

MLB debut
- August 19, 2020, for the Detroit Tigers

MLB statistics (through 2026 season)
- Win–loss record: 29–35
- Earned run average: 4.22
- Strikeouts: 475
- Stats at Baseball Reference

Teams
- Detroit Tigers (2020–2022, 2024–2026); San Diego Padres (2026)

Career highlights and awards
- All-Star (2025)

Casey Arthur Mize (born May 1, 1997) is an American professional baseball pitcher who is a free agent. He has played in Major League Baseball (MLB) for the Detroit Tigers and San Diego Padres. Mize played college baseball for the Auburn Tigers and was selected by the Detroit Tigers with the first overall pick in the 2018 MLB draft. He made his MLB debut in 2020 and was an All-Star in 2025.

== Amateur career ==
Mize attended Springville High School in Springville, Alabama. During his high school career, he went 19–2. He committed to Auburn University to play college baseball.

As a freshman in 2016, he appeared in 16 games with 7 starts and went 2–5 with a 3.52 earned run average (ERA) and 59 strikeouts. After the 2016 season, he played collegiate summer baseball with the Wareham Gatemen of the Cape Cod Baseball League. As a sophomore in 2017, Mize pitched in 13 games with 12 starts, going 8–2 with a 2.04 ERA with 109 strikeouts and only nine walks. After the season, he played for the United States collegiate national team during the summer. Mize was named Auburn's opening day starter for the 2018 season. On March 9, 2018, Mize threw a no-hitter against the Northeastern Huskies, the ninth in program history. Mize finished the 2018 season 10-6 with a 3.30 ERA and 156 strikeouts over 17 starts.

== Professional career ==
=== Draft and minor leagues (2018–2019) ===
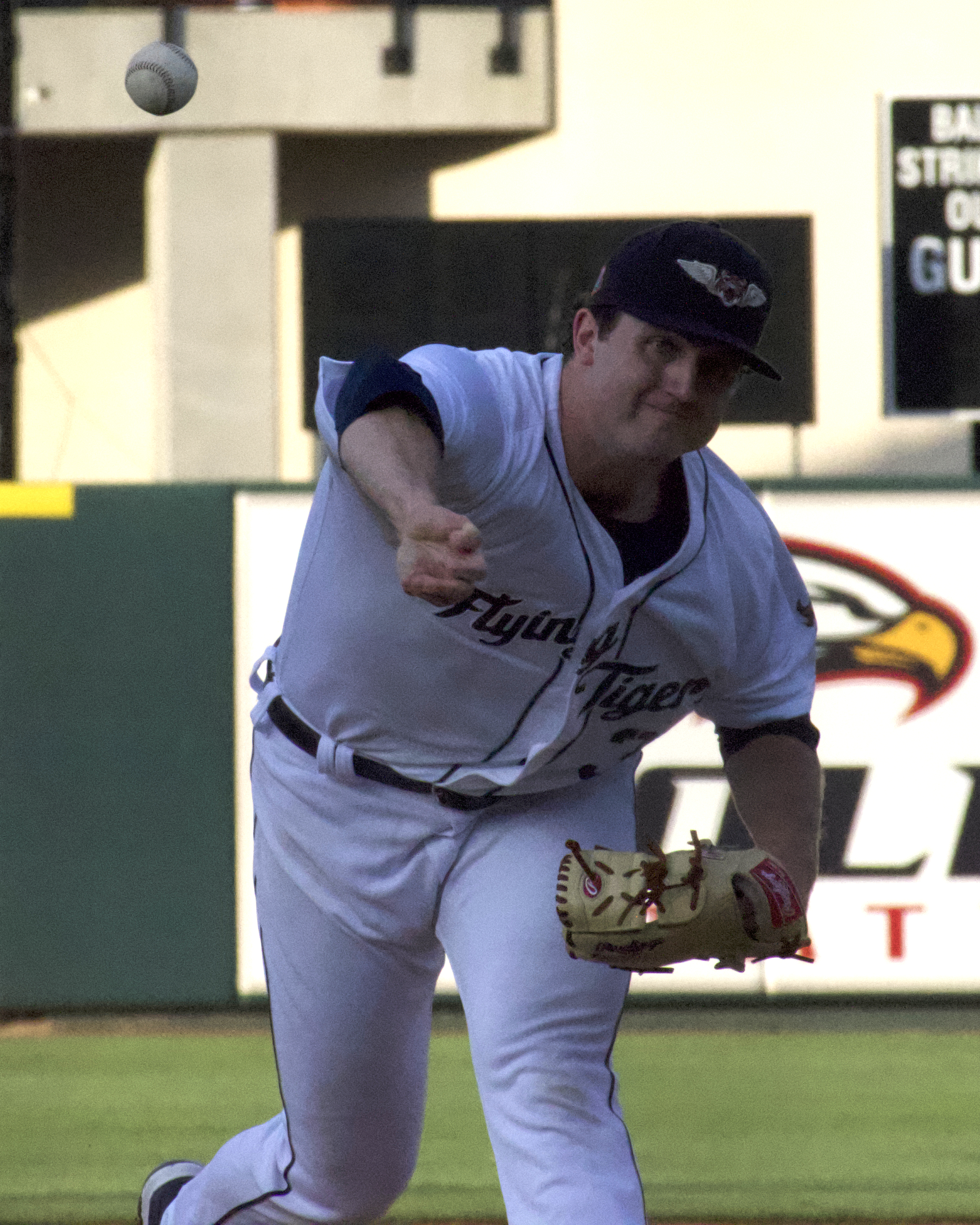
Mize with the Lakeland Flying Tigers in 2019.

The Detroit Tigers selected Mize with the first overall pick in the 2018 MLB draft. On June 25, 2018, Mize signed with the Tigers, featuring a $7.5 million signing bonus. He made his professional debut with the Gulf Coast Tigers of the Rookie-level Gulf Coast League. After one start, he was promoted to the Lakeland Flying Tigers of the High–A Florida State League. After compiling a combined 0–1 record with a 3.95 ERA in five starts between both teams, Mize was shut down for the rest of the season due to an innings limit.

In 2019, the Tigers invited Mize to spring training as a non-roster player. He returned to Lakeland to begin the 2019 season, and was its Opening Day starter. After making four starts for Lakeland with an 0.35 ERA, the Tigers promoted Mize to the Erie SeaWolves of the Double–A Eastern League. In his first start for Erie, he tossed a no-hitter, in which he hit a batter, walked another, and struck out seven on 98 pitches, in a 1–0 SeaWolves victory over the Altoona Curve. On June 15, Mize was placed on the 7-day injured list with shoulder inflammation.

=== Detroit Tigers (2020–2026) ===
On August 19, 2020, Mize was promoted to the major leagues by the Tigers and made his MLB debut that evening against the Chicago White Sox. Mize threw 73 pitches over 4 1/3 innings in his first start, allowing three earned runs while striking out seven and walking none in a no-decision. On September 11 against the Chicago White Sox, Mize took a no-hitter into the sixth inning, before a double by Yolmer Sánchez ruined the no-hit bid. With the 2020 Detroit Tigers, Mize appeared in seven games, compiling a 0–3 record with 6.99 ERA and 26 strikeouts in 28 1/3 innings pitched.

On March 26, 2021, Tigers manager A. J. Hinch announced that Mize would be in the Tigers starting rotation to begin the 2021 season. On April 12, Mize earned his first major league win, throwing seven scoreless innings in the Tigers' 6–2 victory over the Houston Astros. In an August 24 road game against the St. Louis Cardinals, Mize made his major league debut as a batter, and collected an RBI on a bases-loaded walk. He also earned the win with five scoreless innings. Mize made 30 starts in the 2021 season, posting a 7–9 record and 3.71 ERA. He struck out 118 batters in 150 1/3 innings, while allowing 130 hits and 41 walks for a 1.137 WHIP.

Mize began the 2022 season as the No. 2 starter in the Tigers rotation. On April 15, the Tigers placed Mize on the 10-day injured list with a right elbow sprain. On June 10, he went on the Tigers' 60-day Injured List. It was revealed that Mize needed Tommy John surgery, which prematurely ended his 2022 season.

Mize did not pitch in a professional game in 2023 as he continued his recovery from Tommy John surgery.

Entering the 2024 season, Mize made the Tigers' Opening Day roster as part of their rotation, beating out Matt Manning for one of the final spots. He was named the team's number five starter. Mize made his first 16 starts of the 2024 season before being placed on the 15-day injured list with a left hamstring strain on July 3. He was transferred to the 60–day injured list on July 29. Mize was activated on August 30. He finished the 2024 season with a 2–6 record, 4.49 ERA and 78 strikeouts in 102 1/3 innings. In November 2024, the Tigers declined Mize's $3.1 million option for the 2025 season, making Mize arbitration eligible.

On January 9, 2025, the Tigers and Mize agreed to a one-year, $2.34 million contract, avoiding arbitration. Mize made the Tigers 2025 rotation as the No. 5 starter. On May 10, the Tigers placed Mize on the 15-day injured list with a strained left hamstring. Mize was activated on May 24, and started against the Cleveland Guardians that evening. On July 11, Mize was added to the 2025 All-Star Game roster as a replacement for Garrett Crochet, due to the scheduling of Crochet's starts. At the time of the selection, Mize was 9–2 with a 2.63 ERA. For the 2025 season, Mize posted a 14–6 record, with a 3.87 ERA and 139 strikeouts in 149 innings pitched.

On January 6, 2026, the Tigers and Mize agreed on a one-year, $6.15 million contract, avoiding arbitration. For the Tigers in 2026, he went 4–6 with a 2.70 ERA, 0.992 WHIP and 85 strikeouts in 86 2/3 innings.

=== San Diego Padres (2026) ===
On August 3, 2026, the Tigers traded Mize and infielder Gage Workman to the San Diego Padres in exchange for pitchers Kash Mayfield and Jackson Wolf. After struggling on his first start against the Arizona Diamondbacks, he bounced back on his next two starts, one of them against the Cleveland Guardians in a 5-0 victory to give Mize's first victory as a Padre. He ended his Padres regular season with a 7.46 ERA over 10 starts before being placed on the 15-day IL with an ankle sprain on September 26.

== Pitch selection ==
Mize throws a four-seam fastball averaging 93–96 MPH (150–155 KPH) that tops out at 98 MPH (158 KPH), and a sinking two-seam fastball that averages 92–95 MPH (148–153 KPH). His primary offspeed pitch is a splitter in the 84–88 MPH (135–142 KPH) range for his career. He added velocity to this pitch in 2025, frequently throwing it at 90 MPH (145 KPH) or higher. He also throws a slider averaging 86 MPH (138 KPH) and an occasional curveball averaging 84 MPH (135 KPH).

== Personal life ==
Mize and his wife, Tali, were married in 2019. They reside in Nashville, Tennessee.
