= Tarik Skubal =

American baseball player (born 1996)

- Skubal with the Detroit Tigers in 2025

Free agent
- Pitcher
- Born: November 20, 1996 (age 30); Hayward, California, U.S.
- Bats: Right Throws: Left

MLB debut
- August 18, 2020, for the Detroit Tigers

MLB statistics (through 2026 season)
- Win–loss record: 66–44
- Earned run average: 3.02
- Strikeouts: 1,075
- Stats at Baseball Reference

Teams
- Detroit Tigers (2020–2026); Los Angeles Dodgers (2026)

Career highlights and awards
- 2× All-Star (2024, 2025); 2× AL Cy Young Award (2024, 2025); Triple Crown (2024); 2× All-MLB First Team (2024, 2025); AL wins leader (2024); 2× AL ERA leader (2024, 2025); MLB strikeout leader (2024)
Medals
Men's baseball
Representing United States
World Baseball Classic
Silver medal – second place	2026 Miami	Team

Tarik Daniel Skubal (born November 20, 1996) is an American professional baseball pitcher who is a free agent. He has previously played in Major League Baseball (MLB) for the Detroit Tigers and Los Angeles Dodgers. Skubal was selected by the Tigers in the ninth round of the 2018 MLB draft and made his MLB debut in 2020.

Skubal is a two-time American League (AL) Cy Young Award winner (2024 and 2025). In 2024, Skubal was named an All-Star and became the first American League pitcher since 2011 to capture both the pitching Triple Crown and the Cy Young Award in a full season. He was again named an All-Star in 2025 and won his second consecutive Cy Young Award.

== Early life ==
Skubal was born in Hayward, California. His father is an elementary school teacher and retired coach. He has three brothers and one stepbrother. He is of paternal Czech descent. His name Tarik means "striker" in Arabic.

Skubal grew up a fan of the Oakland Athletics. He played two years of Little League Baseball, representing Cordelia, California, and the wider Tri-Valley area. After his family moved to Kingman, Arizona, he attended the Kingman Academy of Learning.

Skubal enrolled at Seattle University to play college baseball for the Seattle Redhawks; it was the only NCAA Division I school to offer him a scholarship. In 2015, Skubal was recognized as a Collegiate Baseball Freshman All-American. Following this season, Skubal missed most of the 2016 season and all of 2017 after undergoing Tommy John surgery. Despite the injury, he was drafted by the Arizona Diamondbacks in the 29th round of the 2017 Major League Baseball draft. He did not sign, opting instead to return to Seattle. Skubal had a combined 21–7 record as a starter for the Redhawks. In 2018, he led the team with 106 strikeouts and 56 walks, pitching 80 innings in his final season in Seattle.

== Professional career ==
=== Detroit Tigers ===
==== Early career ====
The Detroit Tigers selected Skubal in the ninth round with the 255th overall selection of the 2018 MLB draft. He received a $350,000 bonus for signing a contract. After the draft, Skubal spent his first professional season with the Gulf Coast Tigers, Connecticut Tigers, and West Michigan Whitecaps, pitching to a combined 3–0 record and 0.40 earned run average (ERA) in 22 1/3 innings pitched. He started 2019 with the Lakeland Flying Tigers. He earned a call-up to the Erie SeaWolves on July 5. Over his first three starts with Erie, he had a 0.56 ERA with 34 strikeouts, giving up five hits in 16 innings. His performances over the season raised his ranking in MLB.com's 2019 Prospect Watch from a preseason #20 ranking in the Tigers' organization to a #4 spot at the midseason update on July 27. He finished the season at Double-A Erie with a 2–3 record, 2.13 ERA, 1.02 WHIP. Opponents hit just .168 off him. Overall in 2019, in High-A and Double-A, Skubal struck out 179 batters in 122 2/3 innings.

The Tigers invited Skubal to spring training in 2020. On August 18, Skubal was recalled from the Tigers' satellite training facility in Toledo, and he made his MLB debut later that day. On August 29, Skubal earned his first major league win, besting the Minnesota Twins. In five innings pitched, Skubal allowed two earned runs and three hits while striking out two and walking none in the Tigers' 4–2 win. With the 2020 Detroit Tigers, Skubal appeared in 8 games, compiling a 1–4 record with 5.63 ERA and 37 strikeouts in 32 innings pitched. His cutter, which averaged 95.4 mph (153.5 km/h), was the fastest cutter of any major league pitcher in 2020.

==== 2021 ====
On March 24, 2021, new Tigers manager A. J. Hinch announced that Skubal had made the Opening Day roster out of spring training and would be in the Tigers' starting rotation. On July 3, Skubal recorded his 100th strikeout of the season, becoming the first Tiger rookie ever to strike out at least 100 batters before the All-Star break. On August 25, against the St. Louis Cardinals, Skubal recorded strikeouts for the first six outs of the game, finishing with ten strikeouts in five innings of work. On September 25, Skubal reached 200 career strikeouts in his first 38 appearances, the fewest number of games in Tigers history that a pitcher needed to reach that milestone. Overall in 2021, Skubal pitched in 31 games, starting all but two of them, posting an 8–12 record and 4.34 ERA while striking out 164 batters in 149 1/3 innings.

==== 2022 ====
Skubal continued to pitch in the Tigers starting rotation in 2022. After posting a 7–8 record with a 3.52 ERA, 111 ERA+, 1.16 WHIP and 117 strikeouts in 117 2/3 innings, he was placed on the injured list on August 3 with fatigue in his pitching arm. On August 17, the Tigers announced Skubal had undergone flexor tendon surgery, definitively ending his 2022 season and likely sidelining him for the beginning of 2023.

==== 2023 ====
On March 14, 2023, the Tigers moved Skubal to the 60-day injured list, stating that he wasn't expected back on the mound until summer. He was activated for his season debut on July 4. He was named American League Pitcher of the Month in September, finishing his final five starts with a 4–0 record and 0.90 ERA. In 2023, he pitched 80 1/3 innings over 15 starts, posting a 7–3 record with a 2.80 ERA and 102 strikeouts. He ranked in the top 4 percent of MLB pitchers in 2023 at earning strikeouts and limiting walks, and his expected ERA was in the top 1 percent of pitchers, according to Baseball Savant.

==== 2024: Triple Crown and Cy Young Award ====
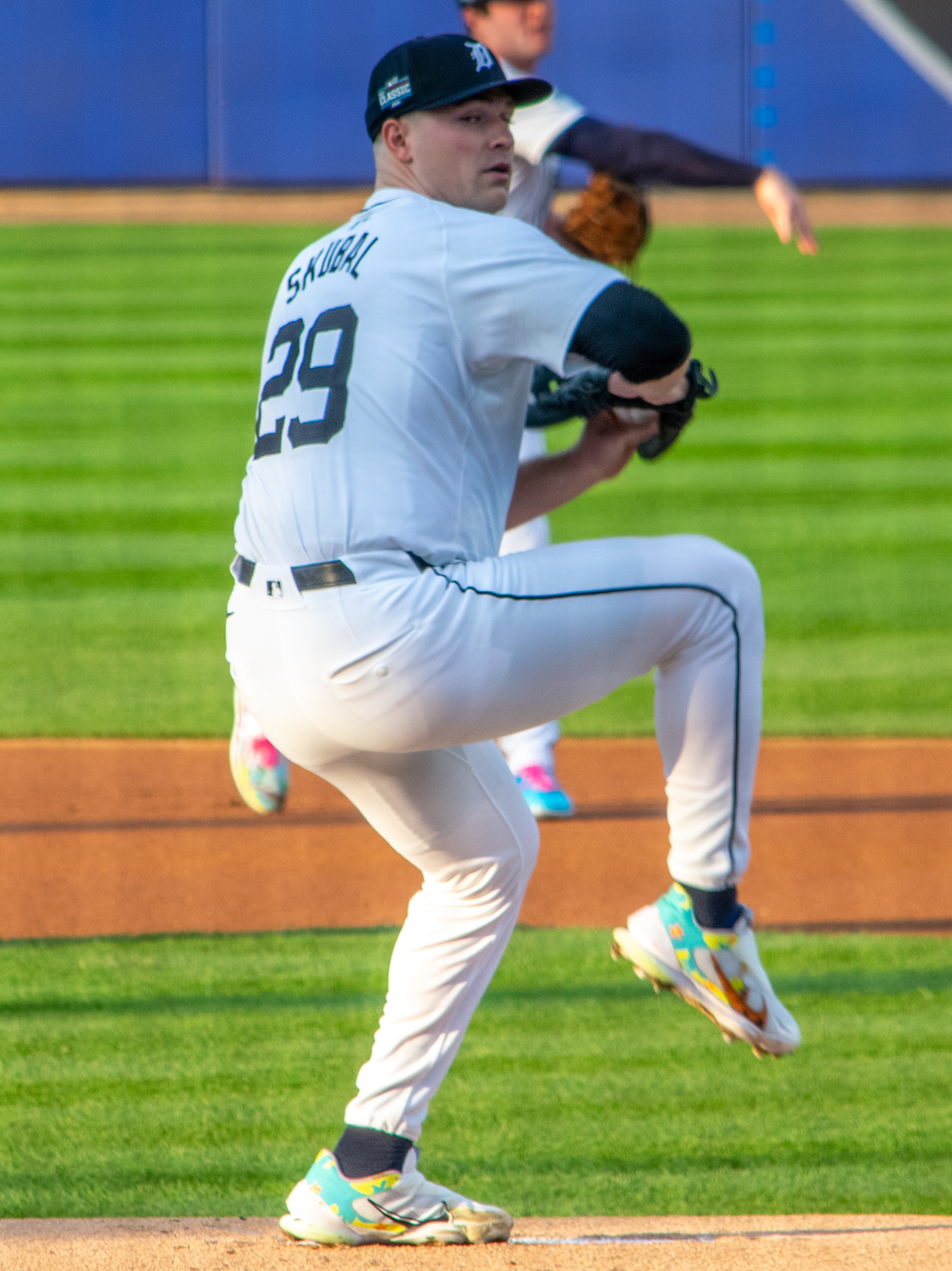
Skubal in 2024

Skubal started for the Tigers on Opening Day of the 2024 season, throwing six shutout innings to lead the Tigers to a 1–0 victory over the Chicago White Sox. On April 28, Skubal became the first pitcher in Tigers franchise history to strike out 40+ batters through his first six starts with fewer than nine walks (he had 41 strikeouts and only six walks to date). In a May 5 game against the New York Yankees, Skubal became the first Tigers pitcher in over 100 years to strike out 12 or more batters without issuing a walk. The last Tiger pitcher to do so was Eric Erickson (in a 16-inning complete game) on May 24, 1918.

On July 7, Skubal was selected to represent the Tigers in the 2024 All-Star Game being held July 16, along with teammate Riley Greene. At the time of his selection, Skubal had a 10–3 record, 2.37 ERA, a league-best 0.90 WHIP and 132 strikeouts in 110 innings. He pitched a 1-2-3 second inning in the All-Star Game.

Skubal finished the season with 18 wins (18–4 record), a 2.39 ERA, 0.922 WHIP, and 228 strikeouts. He became the first pitcher to win the Triple Crown since Shane Bieber in the COVID-19 shortened 2020 season. He and fellow Cy Young awardee Chris Sale were the first pitchers to earn the Triple Crown in a full season since 2011, when both Justin Verlander (AL) and Clayton Kershaw (NL) earned the distinction. Additionally, Skubal led the American League with a 170 ERA+ and 2.50 fielding-independent pitching (FIP) rating, while leading all major league pitchers with a 6.3 Wins Against Replacement (WAR).

On October 1, Skubal earned the first postseason win of his career after throwing six scoreless innings with six strikeouts against the Houston Astros in Game 1 of the AL Wild Card Series. He threw seven shutout innings against the Cleveland Guardians in Game 2 of the AL Division Series, and took the loss in Game 5 after giving up a grand slam in the fifth inning, ultimately losing the series. Across three games and 19.0 innings of the 2024 postseason, Skubal recorded a 1–1 record with a 2.37 ERA and 20 strikeouts.

After the season, Skubal won the AL Cy Young Award for the first time in his career. On the strength of his Triple Crown campaign, he won the Cy Young Award unanimously, earning all 30 first-place votes.

==== 2025: All-Star and second Cy Young ====
Skubal in 2025

On January 9, 2025, the Tigers and Skubal agreed to a one-year, $10.15 million contract, avoiding arbitration. Skubal started for the Tigers on Opening Day of the season, taking a 5–4 loss against the defending World Series champion Los Angeles Dodgers. On May 25, Skubal pitched a Maddux, throwing only 94 pitches in a complete-game shutout versus the Guardians, with a career-high-tying 13 strikeouts, no walks, and two hits allowed. The 5–0 victory was both the first complete game and the first shutout of his career.

On June 24, Skubal earned the 50th win of his career after allowing six hits, one walk, and four runs, while striking out eight batters in 6 innings to beat the Athletics 11–4. In his next start on June 29, Detroit defeated the Minnesota Twins, 3–0, behind Skubal's seven innings with 13 strikeouts and one hit allowed; each Twins starter struck out at least once. He was the first pitcher in Tigers history with at least 13 strikeouts and one hit or fewer in a game.

On July 6, Skubal was named to the All-Star Game roster, his second consecutive All-Star selection. On July 12, American League (AL) manager Aaron Boone named Skubal the starting pitcher for the AL in the game. He gave up hits to the first three batters in the game, allowing two runs in one inning as the AL lost.

With ten strikeouts on August 19 against the Houston Astros, Skubal became the first MLB pitcher to reach 200 strikeouts in 2025, the second season in a row he has done that.

For the 2025 season, Skubal went 13–6 with 241 strikeouts and an AL-leading 2.21 ERA. He also led the league's pitchers in WAR (6.6, according to Baseball Reference), ERA+ (187), and FIP (2.45), while leading the majors in WHIP (0.891), walks per 9 innings (1.5), and strikeout-to-walk ratio (7.30).

His 2025 regular season efforts resulted in him winning his second consecutive AL Cy Young award. He was the first pitcher to win consecutive awards since Jacob deGrom won the NL Cy Young in 2018 and 2019. He was the first in the American League since Pedro Martinez won the award in 1999 and 2000. He also became the 12th pitcher to win back-to-back Cy Young Awards.

In Game 1 of the AL Wild Card Series against the Guardians, Skubal tied a Tigers playoff record, set by Joe Coleman in 1972, with 14 strikeouts. The Tigers won 2–1. In Game 5 of the AL Division Series against the Mariners, Skubal broke a winner-take-all postseason record with 13 strikeouts. Earlier in the game, Skubal set a record for most strikeouts in a row in a postseason game with seven. Across three games and 20.2 innings of the 2025 postseason, Skubal recorded a 1–0 record with a 1.74 ERA and 36 strikeouts.

==== 2026 ====
On February 5, 2026, Skubal won his arbitration hearing and was awarded $32 million for the 2026 season. The Tigers had offered $19 million, forcing a three-person arbitration panel to make the decision, ultimately deciding in favor of Skubal's request. The salary decision breaks the arbitration record of $31 million awarded to Juan Soto in 2024, and is well above the former arbitration record for a pitcher, which was $19.75 million awarded to David Price in 2015.

Skubal made his third straight Opening Day start for the Tigers on March 26 against the San Diego Padres. He earned the win with six innings of three-hit ball, striking out six, walking none and allowing one unearned run. On May 4, it was announced Skubal would undergo surgery for loose bodies in his left elbow, a procedure that typically takes 2–3 months to recover from, but only resulted in a six-week absence with Skubal pitching for the Tigers on June 13. On July 29, Skubal whiffed Taylor Ward of the Baltimore Orioles for his 1,000th career strikeout. By innings pitched (857), he reached the milestone faster than any Tiger in history, considerably faster than Max Scherzer's mark of 1,000 strikeouts in 944 2/3 innings. By games played (153), Skubal is the second-fastest to 1,000 strikeouts by a left-hander in MLB history, behind only Randy Johnson (152 games).

For the Tigers in 2026, Skubal went 7–5 with a 2.79 ERA, a 0.910 WHIP, and 116 strikeouts in 96 2/3 innings.

=== Los Angeles Dodgers ===
On August 2, 2026, the Tigers traded Skubal to the Los Angeles Dodgers in exchange for Zyhir Hope, River Ryan, and Brady Smith.

With the Dodgers in 2026, Skubal made 10 starts and posted a 5–2 record, with a 2.61 ERA, 1.048 WHIP and 70 strikeouts in 62 innings in the regular season. During the postseason, he made two starts, going 1-1 with a 2.45 ERA and 14 strikeouts in 11 innings. He and the Dodgers were eliminated in four games in the NLCS by the Milwaukee Brewers.

== International career ==
Skubal was included on the United States national baseball team for the 2026 World Baseball Classic, but only played once before rejoining the Tigers for spring training since he wanted to focus on the upcoming season. His lone appearance came in the pool stage against Great Britain, allowing a home run on the opening pitch before striking out five batters on 41 pitches; the United States won 9–1. He returned to the team to support them in the championship game.

== Pitching style ==
Skubal releasing a pitch

Skubal throws both four-seam and sinking two-seam fastballs, each averaging around 96 miles per hour (154 km/h), with his four-seam fastball having reached as fast as 102.7 mph (165.3 km/h). His off-speed pitches include a slider that averages 88 mph (142 km/h), with an occasional "turbo slider" reaching as high as 95 mph (153 km/h). Since 2023, his best and most used off-speed pitch is a changeup that averages 86 mph (138 km/h) with an elite seam-shifted wake, generating the lowest contact rate (54.6%) and highest chase rate (42.8%) of all his pitches, with a career .186 batting average against. Compared to most changeups, which almost always break straight downward, Skubal throws the pitch in a way that causes the seams of the baseball to catch the air in just the right way to make the ball move unpredictably. In 2025, MLB.com called Skubal's changeup "the most valuable pitch in baseball," due to its league-leading +25 run value. That season it was the hardest changeup to hit in the major leagues (.156 batting average against), and had the second highest whiff rate (47.0%). He also occasionally throws a knuckle curve that averages 77 mph (124 km/h).
