= Kevin McGonigle =

American baseball player (born 2004)

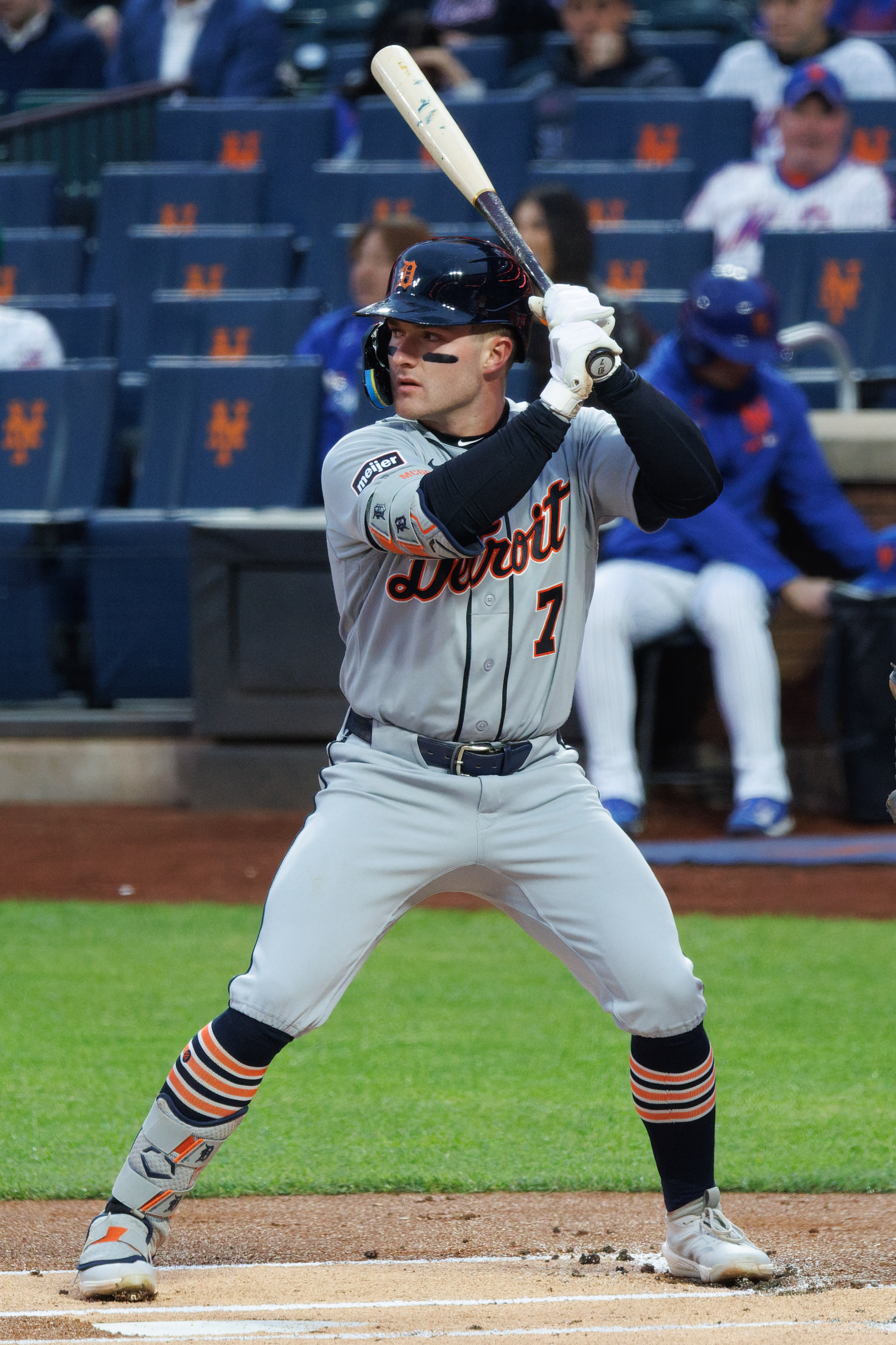
- McGonigle with the Tigers in 2026

Detroit Tigers – No. 7
- Infielder
- Born: August 18, 2004 (age 22); Aldan, Pennsylvania, U.S.
- Bats: Left Throws: Right

MLB debut
- March 26, 2026, for the Detroit Tigers

MLB statistics (through 2026 season)
- Batting average: .278
- Home runs: 18
- Runs batted in: 72
- Stats at Baseball Reference

Teams
- Detroit Tigers (2026–present)

Career highlights and awards
- All-Star (2026); AL Rookie of the Year (2026); Silver Slugger Award (2026)
Medals
Men's baseball
Representing United States
U-18 Baseball World Cup
Gold medal – first place	2022 Sarasota-Bradenton	Team

Kevin Patrick McGonigle (born August 18, 2004) is an American professional baseball infielder for the Detroit Tigers of Major League Baseball (MLB). He made his MLB debut in 2026, and was also selected to his first All-Star Game appearance and was also named American League Rookie of the Year the same year.

== Amateur career ==
McGonigle grew up in Aldan, Pennsylvania and attended Bonner & Prendergast Catholic High School. He committed to play college baseball at Auburn University as a freshman in high school. McGonigle batted .457 with 11 home runs as a junior and was named the Delaware County Player of the Year. In the following summer he competed in USA Baseball's Prospect Development Pipeline league, where he impressed Major League scouts with his batting approach. He later played for the United States national baseball team in the 2022 U-18 Baseball World Cup. As a senior, McGonigle was named the Philadelphia Catholic League Player of the Year and the Pennsylvania Gatorade Player of the Year after batting .474 with four home runs and 16 RBIs in 21 games played.

== Professional career ==
=== Draft and minor leagues (2023–2025) ===
The Detroit Tigers of Major League Baseball (MLB) selected McGonigle 37th overall in the 2023 MLB draft. Although he had previously committed to playing college baseball for the Auburn Tigers, McGonigle joined Detroit on a $2.85 million signing bonus instead. He began his professional baseball career with the Florida Complex League (FCL) Tigers, going 3-for-9 with a double in his first three Rookie-level games. After hitting .273 with one RBI in nine FCL games, McGonigle was one of six position player prospects promoted to the Single-A Lakeland Flying Tigers at the end of August. He hit .350 with one home run in 12 Florida State League (FSL) games after this promotion, recording 11 walks to only five strikeouts in 45 plate appearances.

McGonigle sustained a left hamstring strain prior to the 2024 season, and did not return to Lakeland until the end of April. He hit .326 with four home runs and 37 RBIs in 60 FSL games, and led the league with a .407 on-base percentage (OBP) and .877 on-base plus slugging (OPS), before he was promoted to the High-A West Michigan Whitecaps on July 21. Despite his offensive prowess, McGonigle struggled defensively at shortstop, particularly with his arm strength. McGonigle's season came to an end on August 10, when he sustained a right hamate bone fracture. At the time of the injury, he was hitting .214 with one home run and seven RBIs in 14 Midwest League games. At the end of the Minor League Baseball season, McGonigle was named the Florida State League Most Valuable Player and was appointed to the FSL All-Star Team.

McGonigle returned to West Michigan to begin the 2025 season. He was selected (alongside Max Clark and Josue Briceño) to represent the Tigers at the 2025 All-Star Futures Game at Truist Park. On July 7, 2025, it was announced that the trio had been promoted to the Double-A Erie SeaWolves. McGonigle won the 2025 Midwest League Top MLB Prospect Award.

=== Detroit Tigers (2026–present) ===
On March 24, 2026, the Tigers announced that McGonigle had made the team's Opening Day roster. His contract was formally selected the following day. McGonigle made his major league debut on March 26, during the season opener against the San Diego Padres, where he got four hits, including a 2-RBI double for his first major league hit off Nick Pivetta. He is the second Tiger (after Billy Bean in 1987) and 21st player overall since 1900 with at least four hits in his MLB debut, and only the sixth to do so on opening day. On April 12, McGonigle hit his first career home run off Sandy Alcántara of the Miami Marlins. Three days later, McGonigle and the Tigers agreed to an eight-year contract extension worth $150 million.

On July 4, 2026, McGonigle was added as a reserve shortstop for the 2026 American League All-Star team. At the time of his selection, he was hitting .284 with a .395 on-base percentage, 7 home runs, 31 RBI, and 11 stolen bases in 11 attempts. He is only the third Tigers player age 21 or younger to make an All-Star team, joining Mark Fidrych (1976) and Al Kaline (1955). In his rookie season, McGonigle slashed .278/.376/.430 with 18 home runs and 72 RBI, while leading his team in both hits (168) and walks (95). He also had a +10 Defensive Runs Saved rating (+8 at third base, +2 at shortstop).

On November 9, 2026, McGonigle was named AL Rookie of the Year, receiving 28 of 30 first-place votes. On November 17, McGonigle was also awarded the AL Silver Slugger Award. Having split time between third base and shortstop, he won in the Utility category. He also finished seventh in the AL MVP voting.

== Personal life ==
McGonigle grew up a fan of the Philadelphia Phillies, modeling his game after Phillies second baseman Chase Utley. Some lessons McGonigle took from Utley include doing everything possible to help your team win, and keeping your chin up no matter what, not just on the field, but in life too.

Awards
Preceded by Joey Cantillo	American League Rookie of the Month; April 2026	Succeeded by Munetaka Murakami
