= Jackson Wolf =

American baseball player (born 1999)

Detroit Tigers
- Pitcher
- Born: April 22, 1999 (age 27); Gahanna, Ohio, U.S.
- Bats: Left Throws: Left

MLB debut
- July 22, 2023, for the San Diego Padres

MLB statistics (through 2023 season)
- Win–loss record: 1–0
- Earned run average: 5.40
- Strikeouts: 1
- Stats at Baseball Reference

Teams
- San Diego Padres (2023)

Jackson David Wolf (born April 22, 1999) is an American professional baseball pitcher in the Detroit Tigers organization. He has previously played in Major League Baseball (MLB) for the San Diego Padres.

== Amateur career ==
Wolf attended Lincoln High School in Gahanna, Ohio, where he played baseball. He went unselected in the 2017 Major League Baseball draft and enrolled at West Virginia University where he played college baseball.

During the summer of 2019, Wolf played in the Cape Cod Baseball League with the Cotuit Kettleers. As a senior at West Virginia in 2021, he started 14 games and went 6–5 with a 3.03 ERA and 104 strikeouts over 89 innings.

== Professional career ==
=== San Diego Padres ===
Wolf was selected by the San Diego Padres in the fourth round with the 129th overall selection of the 2021 Major League Baseball draft. He signed with the team for $300,000. He split his first professional season in 2021 between the Rookie-level Arizona Complex League Padres and the Single-A Lake Elsinore Storm, posting a 3.00 ERA and 24 strikeouts over 15 innings. Wolf opened the 2022 season with the High-A Fort Wayne TinCaps, starting 22 games and going 7–8 with a 4.01 ERA and 134 strikeouts over 119 innings. He was later promoted to the Double-A San Antonio Missions near the season's end with whom he made two starts.

He returned to San Antonio to begin the 2023 season. In his first 17 starts, Wolf logged an 8–8 record and 3.39 ERA with 104 strikeouts across 85 innings pitched. On July 22, 2023, Wolf was selected to the 40-man roster and promoted to the major leagues for the first time. He made his MLB debut that day as Detroit's starting pitcher, pitching five innings and giving up three runs in a 14-3 Padres win over the Detroit Tigers at Comerica Park and earning the win. Wolf recorded one strikeout during the game, that of Spencer Torkelson. This marked his only appearance for the Padres, and Wolf was optioned back to San Antonio the following day.

=== Pittsburgh Pirates ===
On August 1, 2023, the Padres traded Wolf, Alfonso Rivas, and Estuar Suero to the Pittsburgh Pirates in exchange for Ji-man Choi and Rich Hill. He made eight starts for the Double–A Altoona Curve, logging an 0–4 record and 4.25 ERA with 30 strikeouts across 36 innings pitched. Wolf was assigned to Double–A Altoona to begin the 2024 season. However, he was designated for assignment following multiple roster moves on March 28, 2024.

=== San Diego Padres (second stint) ===
On April 2, 2024, Wolf was traded back to the San Diego Padres in exchange for Kervin Pichardo. In his first 23 games (18 starts) for the Triple–A El Paso Chihuahuas, he struggled to a 3–9 record and 7.21 ERA with 71 strikeouts across 83 2/3 innings pitched. On August 8, Wolf was designated for assignment by the Padres. He cleared waivers and was sent outright to El Paso on August 10. He played the remainder of the season with El Paso while also making six appearances with Double–A San Antonio.

In 2025, Wolf played with El Paso and San Antonio and ended the season with a 9–4 record, a 5.04 ERA, and 134 strikeouts across 128 2/3 innings pitched between the two teams. He returned to El Paso to start the 2026 season, appeared in 24 games, and had 5–10 record, a 7.05 ERA, and 90 strikeouts across 89 1/3 innings pitched.

=== Detroit Tigers ===
On August 3, 2026, Wolf and Kash Mayfield were traded to the Detroit Tigers in exchange for Casey Mize and Gage Workman. He was assigned to the Triple–A Toledo Mud Hens and pitched in seven games (six starts) in which he had a 4–1 record, a 1.62 ERA, and 40 strikeouts across 33 1/3 innings pitched.
