= River Ryan (baseball) =

American baseball player (born 1998)

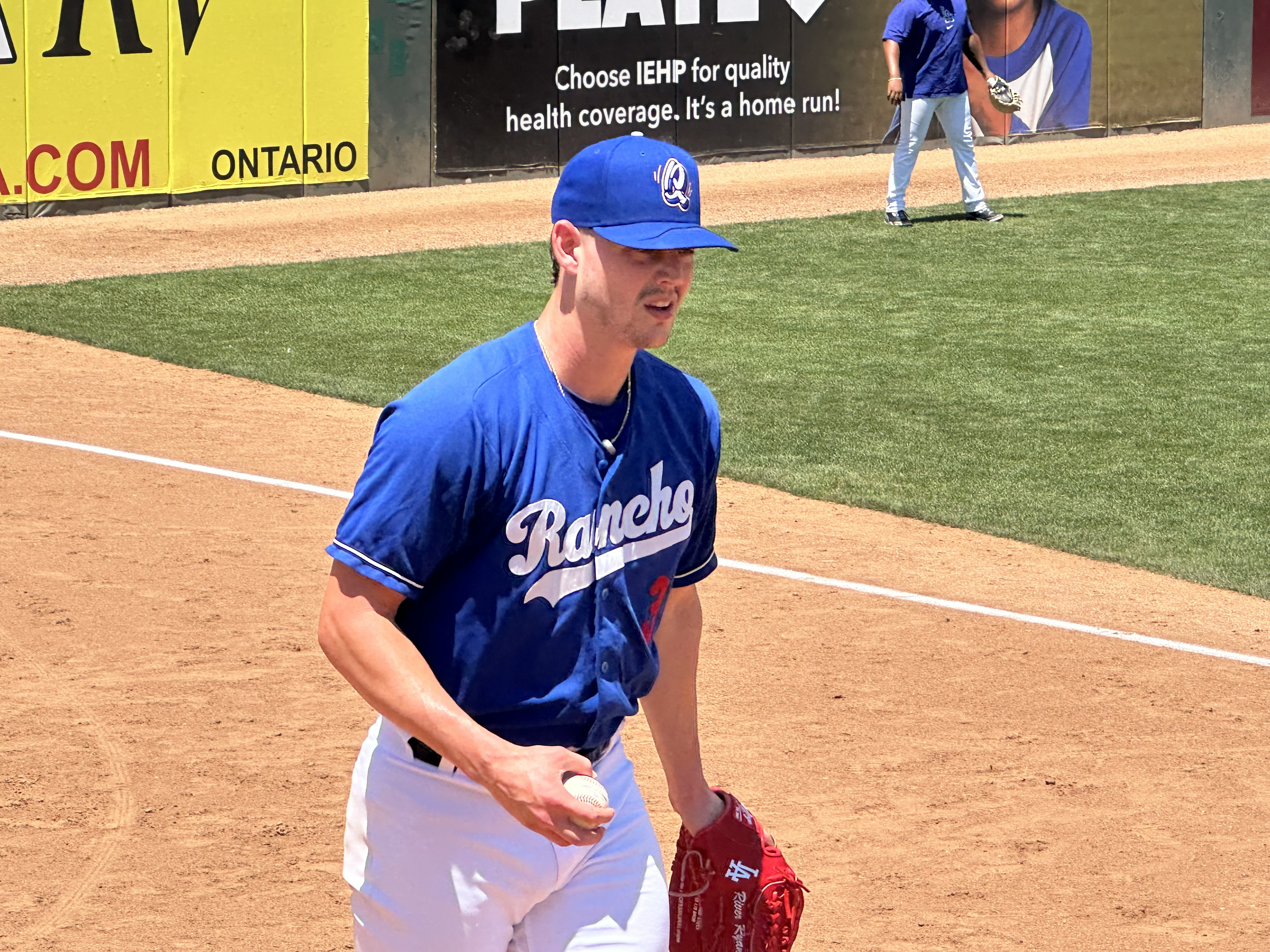
- Ryan with the Rancho Cucamonga Quakes

Detroit Tigers – No. 77
- Pitcher
- Born: August 17, 1998 (age 28); Charlotte, North Carolina, U.S.
- Bats: Right Throws: Right

MLB debut
- July 22, 2024, for the Los Angeles Dodgers

MLB statistics (through 2026 season)
- Win–loss record: 1–0
- Earned run average: 1.82
- Strikeouts: 24
- Stats at Baseball Reference

Teams
- Los Angeles Dodgers (2024); Detroit Tigers (2026–present)

River Jason Ryan (born August 17, 1998) is an American professional baseball pitcher for the Detroit Tigers of Major League Baseball (MLB). He has previously played in MLB for the Los Angeles Dodgers. Ryan was selected in the 11th round of the 2021 MLB draft by the San Diego Padres and made his MLB debut in 2024 with the Dodgers.

== Career ==
=== Amateur career ===
Ryan attended North Mecklenburg High School in Huntersville, North Carolina. He enrolled at the University of North Carolina at Pembroke and played college baseball for the UNC Pembroke Braves for four seasons as a two-way player.

=== San Diego Padres ===
The San Diego Padres selected Ryan in the 11th round, with the 340th overall pick, of the 2021 Major League Baseball draft. After signing with the team he was assigned to the Rookie-level Arizona Complex League Padres, where he played in 12 games as a position player and slashed .308/.349/.436.

=== Los Angeles Dodgers ===
The Padres traded Ryan to the Los Angeles Dodgers in exchange for Matt Beaty on March 28, 2022. The Dodgers had him focus solely on pitching. Ryan split the 2022 season between the Low-A Rancho Cucamonga Quakes and the High-A Great Lakes Loons and went 2–4 with a 2.45 ERA and 70 strikeouts in 47 2/3 innings pitched. In 2023 he began with the Double-A Tulsa Drillers and was promoted to the Triple-A Oklahoma City Dodgers, pitching in a combined 26 games for a 1–7 record, 4.40 ERA and 110 strikeouts in 104 1/3 innings.

Ryan began 2024 on the minor league injured list after suffering from shoulder fatigue in spring training and didn't appear in a game until making a couple of rehab appearances in the Arizona Complex League and with the Quakes in June. After five starts for Oklahoma City, the Dodgers purchased his contract, added him to the 40-man roster and called him up to the major leagues to make his MLB debut on July 22 as the starting pitcher against the San Francisco Giants. Ryan pitched 5 1/3 innings in his debut, allowing only one unearned run while striking out two batters (Tyler Fitzgerald was the first). On July 28, Ryan picked up his first major league win against the Houston Astros. He made four starts for the Dodgers, allowing three earned runs in 20 1/3 innings with 18 strikeouts. He left a game on August 10 with an elbow injury, later diagnosed as a UCL strain, which shut him down for the rest of the season. On August 12, it was announced that Ryan would require Tommy John surgery, ruling him out for the 2025 season as well.

Following the 2025 campaign, it was reported that Ryan gained 30 pounds of muscle during his recovery, going from 195 pounds to 225 at the height of 6'1. Ryan was optioned to the Triple-A Oklahoma City Comets to begin the 2026 season. He was limited to just eight starts with the Comets as a result of being shut down twice with hamstring injuries; pitching across 36 1/3 innings, he logged a 3–1 record and 4.46 ERA with 43 strikeouts.

=== Detroit Tigers ===
On August 2, 2026, the Dodgers traded Ryan to the Detroit Tigers, along with Zyhir Hope and Brady Smith, in exchange for Tarik Skubal. Ryan was assigned to the Triple-A Toledo Mud Hens until he was called up to the majors on September 21, making his Tigers debut in a three-inning start against the Washington Nationals.

== Personal life ==
Ryan's older brother, Ryder, is also a baseball player, who is currently a member of the Los Angeles Dodgers organization.
