= Detroit Tigers minor league players =

Below is a partial list of minor league baseball players in the Detroit Tigers system.

== Justice Bigbie ==
Justice Bigbie

Detroit Tigers – No. 3
- Outfielder
- Born: January 24, 1999 (age 27); Chesapeake, Virginia, U.S.
- Bats: Right Throws: Right

Justice Gabriel Bigbie (born January 24, 1999) is an American professional baseball outfielder in the Detroit Tigers organization.

Bigbie attended Grassfield High School in Chesapeake, Virginia, and played college baseball at Western Carolina University. After his senior year of high school, Bigbie played collegiate summer baseball with the Geneva Red Wings of the Perfect Game Collegiate Baseball League. In the summers after his freshman and sophomore years with the Catamounts, Bigbie played summer ball with the Madison Mallards of the Northwoods League (NWL). In 2019, he was named NWL Most Valuable Player, batting .349 across 68 games and leading the league in RBI. In summer 2020, the NWL responded to the COVID-19 pandemic by operating with hyper-regional pod divisions that included temporary teams. Bigbie played for one of these temporary teams, the K-Town Bobbers, alongside future MLB players such as Drake Baldwin and Brett Harris.

Bigbie was drafted by the Detroit Tigers in the 19th round of the 2021 Major League Baseball draft. He made his professional debut that year with the Florida Complex League Tigers. He played 2022 with the Lakeland Flying Tigers and West Michigan Whitecaps and started 2023 with West Michigan before being promoted to the Erie SeaWolves and later the Toledo Mud Hens. All of the 2024 season was spent with Toledo, while both the 2025 and 2026 seasons were split between Erie and Toledo.

- Career statistics from Baseball Reference (Minors)
- Western Carolina Catamounts bio

== Josue Briceño ==
Josue Briceño

Detroit Tigers – No. 9
- First baseman / Catcher
- Born: September 23, 2004 (age 22); Maracay, Venezuela
- Bats: Left Throws: Right

Josue David Briceño (born September 23, 2004) is a Venezuelan professional baseball first baseman and catcher in the Detroit Tigers organization.

Briceño signed with the Detroit Tigers as an international free agent in 2022. He made his professional debut that season with the Dominican Summer League Tigers. He played 2023 with the Florida Complex League Tigers and Lakeland Tigers.

Briceño returned to Lakeland in 2024 and played in only 40 games due to injury. After the season, he played in the Arizona Fall League. He was named the Fall Leagues Joe Black Award MVP after becoming the first player in league history to hit for a Triple Crown.

Briceño was selected (alongside Kevin McGonigle and Max Clark) to represent the Tigers at the 2025 All-Star Futures Game at Truist Park. On July 7, 2025, it was announced that the trio had been promoted to the Double-A Erie SeaWolves.

On March 5, 2026, it was announced that Briceño would miss multiple months after undergoing surgery to repair a torn tendon in his right wrist.

- Career statistics from Baseball Reference (Minors)

== Garrett Burhenn ==
Garrett Burhenn

Detroit Tigers
- Pitcher
- Born: September 12, 1999 (age 27); Indianapolis, Indiana, U.S.
- Bats: Right Throws: Right

Garrett Sommer Burhenn (born September 12, 1999) is an American professional baseball pitcher in the Detroit Tigers organization.

Burhenn grew up in Indianapolis, Indiana, and attended Lawrence North High School. He was named first team All-State as a senior.

Burhenn played college baseball for the Ohio State Buckeyes for three seasons. He was named to the Big Ten Conference All-Freshman team in his first season after posting a 6–4 record with a 3.96 ERA and 69 strikeouts. Burhenn went 2–2 with an 8.02 ERA and 29 strikeouts in 21 1/3 innings pitched over four starts during his sophomore season before it was cut short due to the coronavirus pandemic. As a junior, he went 7–2 with a 3.81 ERA and 91 strikeouts in 80 1/3 innings pitched and was named third team All-Big Ten.

Burhenn was selected in the ninth round of the 2021 Major League Baseball draft by the Detroit Tigers. He signed with the team on July 21, 2021, and received a $160,800 signing bonus. Burhenn was assigned to the Lakeland Flying Tigers of the Single-A Florida State League at the opening of the 2022 season.

- Career statistics from MLB · Baseball Reference (Minors)
- Ohio State Buckeyes bio

== Yoniel Curet ==
Yoniel Curet

Detroit Tigers
- Pitcher
- Born: November 3, 2002 (age 24); San Pedro de Macoris, Dominican Republic
- Bats: Right Throws: Right

Yoniel Curet (born November 3, 2002) is a Dominican professional baseball pitcher in the Detroit Tigers organization.

Curet signed with the Tampa Bay Rays as an international free agent on July 2, 2019. He did not play in a game in 2020 due to the cancellation of the minor league season because of the COVID-19 pandemic.

On November 14, 2023, the Rays added Curet to their 40-man roster to protect him from the Rule 5 draft. He was optioned to the Double–A Montgomery Biscuits to begin the 2024 season. In 26 starts split between the High-A Bowling Green Hot Rods and Double-A Montgomery, Curet accumulated a 9–7 record and 2.95 ERA with 159 strikeouts across 119 innings pitched.

Curet was optioned to the Triple-A Durham Bulls to begin the 2025 season. He made 16 appearances (14 starts) split between the rookie-level Florida Complex League Rays, Montgomery, and Durham, accumulating a 3–3 record and 3.90 ERA with 62 strikeouts across 55 1/3 innings pitched. Curet was designated for assignment following the signing of Cedric Mullins on December 6, 2025.

On December 10, 2025, the Rays traded Curet to the Philadelphia Phillies in exchange for pitcher Tommy McCollum. Curet was optioned to the Double-A Reading Fightin Phils to begin the 2026 season. On April 8, 2026, Curet was designated for assignment by the Phillies following the acquisition of Steward Berroa.

On April 13, 2026, Curet was claimed off waivers by the Detroit Tigers. He made one appearance for the Triple-A Toledo Mud Hens, allowing one run on three hits over 2/3 innings pitched. On May, 2, Curet was designated for assignment by the Tigers after they selected the contract of Ricky Vanasco. He cleared waivers and was sent outright to Toledo on May 7. In 31 games between Triple-A and Double-A he threw 34.1 innings of relief going 1–3 with a 7.86 ERA with 42 strikeouts and one save.

On November 3, 2026, Curet re-signed with the Tigers on a minor league contract for the 2027 season.

- Career statistics from Baseball Reference (Minors)

== Peyton Graham ==
Peyton Graham

Detroit Tigers
- Shortstop
- Born: January 26, 2001 (age 25); Waxahachie, Texas, U.S.
- Bats: Right Throws: Right

Peyton Graham (born January 26, 2001) is an American baseball shortstop in the Detroit Tigers organization. He played college baseball for the Oklahoma Sooners.

Graham grew up in Waxahachie, Texas and attended Waxahachie High School. He was named the 10-5A Offensive Player of the Year during his junior season. As a senior, Graham hit for a .374 average with five home runs, 19 RBIs, and 17 runs scored and also pitched to a 2.80 ERA and 22 strikeouts. He also played in the Texas High School Baseball Coaches All-Star Game.

As a freshman, Graham started all 18 of Oklahoma's games before it was cut short due to the coronavirus pandemic and batted .358 with three home runs, eight doubles, and 10 RBIs. He was named second team All-Big 12 Conference after hitting .288 with 11 home runs and 28 RBIs in his sophomore season. After the season, Graham played collegiate summer baseball for the Yarmouth–Dennis Red Sox of the Cape Cod Baseball League. Graham was named a preseason All-American by Baseball America entering his junior season. He was also moved from third base to shortstop.

Graham was drafted in the second round, 51st overall, by the Detroit Tigers in the 2022 Major League Baseball draft. He signed with the team on July 25, 2022, and received an over-slot signing bonus of $1.8 million.

- Career statistics from Baseball Reference (Minors)
- Oklahoma Sooners bio

== Jaden Hamm ==
Jaden Hamm

Detroit Tigers
- Pitcher
- Born: September 5, 2002 (age 24); Columbia, Tennessee, U.S.
- Bats: Right Throws: Right

Jaden Kyler Hamm (born September 5, 2002) is an American professional baseball pitcher in the Detroit Tigers organization.

Hamm attended Columbia Central High School in Columbia, Tennessee and played college baseball at Middle Tennessee State University. As a junior at Middle Tennessee in 2023, he started 14 games and went 5–4 with a 5.31 ERA and 93 strikeouts. After his junior season, he was selected by the Detroit Tigers in the fifth round of the 2023 Major League Baseball draft and signed.

Hamm made his professional debut in 2023 with the Florida Complex League Tigers and was later promoted to the Lakeland Flying Tigers. Over 12 innings pitched between the two teams for the season, he did not allow a run. He was assigned to the West Michigan Whitecaps to open the 2024 season. Over 24 games (23 starts), Hamm went 5–4 with a 2.64 ERA and 122 strikeouts over 99 innings. Hamm was assigned to the Erie SeaWolves to open the 2025 season. He missed nearly two months due to an undisclosed injury. He made two rehab appearances with Lakeland before returning to Erie. Across twenty starts with Erie, Hamm pitched to a 2–5 record, a 4.88 ERA, and 76 strikeouts over 83 innings. Hamm did not make an appearance in 2026 due to a shoulder injury.

- Career statistics from Baseball Reference (Minors)
- Middle Tennessee Blue Raiders bio

== Ben Jacobs ==
Ben Jacobs

Detroit Tigers
- Pitcher
- Born: June 11, 2004 (age 22); Fountain Valley, California, U.S.
- Bats: Left Throws: Left

Benjamin Ross Jacobs (born June 11, 2004) is an American professional baseball pitcher in the Detroit Tigers organization.

Jacobs attended Huntington Beach High School in Huntington Beach, California and played college baseball for the UCLA Bruins and Arizona State Sun Devils. In 2024, he played collegiate summer baseball with the Cotuit Kettleers of the Cape Cod Baseball League. He was selected by the Detroit Tigers in the third round of the 2025 Major League Baseball draft.

Jacobs made his professional debut in 2026 with the Lakeland Flying Tigers and was promoted to the West Michigan Whitecaps during the season.

- Career statistics from Baseball Reference (Minors)

== Thayron Liranzo ==
Thayron Liranzo

Detroit Tigers – No. 49
- Catcher / First baseman
- Born: July 5, 2003 (age 23); San Francisco de Macorís, Dominican Republic
- Bats: Switch Throws: Right

Thayron Liranzo (born July 5, 2003) is a Dominican professional baseball catcher and first baseman for the Detroit Tigers of Major League Baseball (MLB).

Liranzo signed with the Los Angeles Dodgers as an international free agent on January 15, 2021. He began his career with 21 games for the Dominican Summer League Dodgers in 2021, hitting .250. The following season, he played for the Arizona Complex League Dodgers, hitting .237 in 41 games. In 2023, Liranzo led the California League in home runs (24) and slugging percentage (.562) with the Rancho Cucamonga Quakes, while hitting .273 in 94 games. He earned All-Star honors for his 2023 season from the California League, Baseball America and MiLB.com. In 2024, he was promoted to the Great Lakes Loons of the Midwest League and was selected to participate in the mid-season All-Star Futures Game. He hit .220 in 74 games for Great Lakes with seven homers and 30 RBI.

On July 30, 2024, the Dodgers traded Liranzo and Trey Sweeney to the Detroit Tigers in exchange for Jack Flaherty. He made 26 appearances down the stretch for the High-A West Michigan Whitecaps, batting .315/.470/.562 with five home runs and 20 RBI.

Liranzo made 88 appearances for the Double-A Erie SeaWolves in 2025; batting .206/.308/.351 with 11 home runs and 45 RBI. On November 18, 2025, the Tigers added Liranzo to their 40-man roster to protect him from the Rule 5 draft.

Liranzo was optioned to the Triple-A Toledo Mud Hens to begin the 2026 season.

- Career statistics from Baseball Reference (Minors)

== Kash Mayfield ==
Kash Mayfield

Detroit Tigers
- Pitcher
- Born: February 8, 2005 (age 21); Elk City, Oklahoma, U.S.
- Bats: Left Throws: Left

Coleman Kash Mayfield (born February 8, 2005) is an American professional baseball pitcher in the Detroit Tigers organization.

Mayfield attended Elk City High School in Elk City, Oklahoma, where he played baseball. As a senior in 2024, he went 8–0 with a 0.16 ERA and 115 strikeouts over 44 innings and was named the Gatorade Oklahoma Baseball Player of the Year, which he also won in 2023. He committed to play college baseball at Oklahoma State University.

Mayfield was drafted by the San Diego Padres in the first round, with the 25th overall selection, of the 2024 Major League Baseball draft. On July 24, 2024, Mayfield signed with the Padres on a $3.4 million contract.

Mayfield made his professional debut in 2025 with the Single-A Lake Elsinore Storm. He made 19 starts and had a 1–5 record, a 2.97 ERA and 88 strikeouts across 60 2/3 innings. He was assigned to the High-A Fort Wayne TinCaps to begin the 2026 season.

On August 3, 2026, the Padres traded Mayfield and Jackson Wolf to the Detroit Tigers in exchange for Casey Mize and Gage Workman.

- Career statistics from Baseball Reference (Minors)

== Izaac Pacheco ==
Izaac Pacheco

Detroit Tigers
- Shortstop
- Born: November 18, 2002 (age 24); Friendswood, Texas, U.S.
- Bats: Left Throws: Right

Izaac Kane Pacheco (born November 18, 2002) is an American baseball shortstop in the Detroit Tigers organization.

Pacheco grew up in Friendswood, Texas, and attended Friendswood High School. He was named the 24-6A Newcomer of the Year after he hit .296 with 14 extra-base hits in his freshman season. Pacheco was named the District 22-5A Offensive Most Valuable Player as a sophomore after he hit for a .442 average with five home runs, 15 RBI, 25 runs scored, and 16 stolen bases. As a senior, Pacheco as the District 22-5A MVP after batting .543 with six home runs, 12 doubles, 45 RBI, and 41 runs scored.

Pacheco was selected 39th overall in the 2021 Major League Baseball draft by the Detroit Tigers. Pacheco signed with the team on July 23, 2021, and received a $2.75 million signing bonus. Pacheco was assigned to the Rookie-level Florida Complex League Tigers after signing, where he batted .226 with four doubles, three triples, one home run, and seven RBI. He opened the 2022 season with the Lakeland Flying Tigers of the Single-A Florida State League. Pacheco batted .267 with 21 doubles and eight home runs in 88 games with the team before being promoted to the High-A West Michigan Whitecaps. He won the 2025 Midwest League Most Valuable Player Award.

- Career statistics from Baseball Reference (Minors)

== RJ Petit ==
RJ Petit

Detroit Tigers
- Pitcher
- Born: September 23, 1999 (age 27); Rock Hill, South Carolina, U.S.
- Bats: Right Throws: Right

Robert George "RJ" Petit (born September 23, 1999) is an American baseball pitcher in the Detroit Tigers organization.

Petit attended Rock Hill High School in Rock Hill, South Carolina, and Charleston Southern University. The Detroit Tigers selected him in the 14th round (405th overall) of the 2021 Major League Baseball draft. Petit split his first professional season between the rookie-level Gulf Coast League Tigers, Single-A Lakeland Flying Tigers, and High-A West Michigan Whitecaps, accumulating an 0–1 record and 7.04 ERA with eight strikeouts across six total appearances.

Petit made 49 appearances split between Lakeland and West Michigan in 2022, posting a combined 3–1 record and 3.67 ERA with 62 strikeouts and five saves over 54 innings of work. He split the 2023 campaign between West Michigan and the Double-A Erie SeaWolves. In 42 total appearances for the two affiliates, Petit compiled a 2–4 record and 3.49 ERA with 56 strikeouts and three saves across 56 2/3 innings pitched.

Petit returned to Erie for the 2024 season, pitching to a 6–7 record and 3.68 ERA with 76 strikeouts and three saves across 43 relief appearances. Petit began the 2025 season with Erie and was promoted to the Triple-A Toledo Mud Hens in July. In 47 outings split between the two affiliates, he posted a cumulative 10–2 record and 2.44 ERA with 79 strikeouts and three saves.

On December 10, 2025, the Colorado Rockies selected Petit from the Detroit Tigers in the Rule 5 draft. On March 9, 2026, Petit was diagnosed with a sprained ulnar collateral ligament in his right elbow. On March 22, it was announced that he would require Tommy John surgery and miss the entirety of the season.

On November 3, 2026, Petit was returned to the Detroit Tigers organization.

- Career statistics from Baseball Reference (Minors)

== Anderson Pilar ==
Anderson Pilar

Detroit Tigers
- Pitcher
- Born: March 2, 1998 (age 28); Villa Isabela, Dominican Republic
- Bats: Right Throws: Right

Anderson Pilar (born March 2, 1998) is a Dominican professional baseball pitcher in the Detroit Tigers organization.

On November 4, 2015, Pilar signed with the Colorado Rockies as an international free agent. He spent his first three professional seasons with the Dominican Summer League Rockies, accumulating a 6-9 record and 2.44 ERA with 80 strikeouts and 9 saves across 96 innings pitched. Pilar spent 2019 with the rookie-level Grand Junction Rockies, recording a 3.93 ERA with 32 strikeouts in 24 appearances out of the bullpen. He did not play in a game in 2020 due to the cancellation of the minor league season because of the COVID-19 pandemic.

Pilar returned to action in 2021 with the Single-A Fresno Grizzlies. In 33 appearances, he compiled a 6-0 record and 1.61 ERA with 57 strikeouts across 61 2/3 innings pitched. He spent 2022 with the High-A Spokane Indians, making 30 appearances and posting a 5-3 record and 4.16 ERA with 59 strikeouts over 62 2/3 innings. Pilar split the 2023 season between the rookie-level Arizona Complex League Rockies, Fresno, and Spokane, accumulating a 7-4 record and 3.07 ERA with 67 strikeouts across 17 games (9 starts). He elected free agency following the season on November 6, 2023.

On December 21, 2023, Pilar signed a minor league contract with the Miami Marlins organization. He split the 2024 season between the High-A Beloit Snappers, Double-A Pensacola Blue Wahoos, and Triple-A Jacksonville Jumbo Shrimp. In 37 games split between the three affiliates, Pilar registered a combined 2.64 ERA with 71 strikeouts over 58 innings pitched.

On December 11, 2024, the Atlanta Braves selected Pilar from the Marlins in the Rule 5 draft. On March 19, 2025, Pilar was returned to the Marlins organization. On June 27, Pilar, Matt Pushard, Christian Roa, and George Soriano threw a combined no-hitter against the Nashville Sounds. In 37 appearances for Jacksonville, he posted a 5-1 record and 4.26 ERA with 50 strikeouts and four saves across 44 1/3 innings pitched. Pilar was released by the Marlins organization on August 12.

On August 13, 2025, Pilar signed a minor league contract with the Atlanta Braves organization. In 11 games (1 start) with Triple-A Gwinnett Stripers he threw 17 innings going 0-0 with a 3.18 ERA with 13 strikeouts and one save.

In 2026, Pilar appeared in 35 games (3 starts) between Double-A and Triple-A he threw 69.1 innings going 5-4 with a 3.76 ERA and 69 strikeouts. He elected free agency on November 2.

On November 17, 2026, Pilar signed a minor league contract with the Detroit Tigers and was assigned to the Triple-A Toledo Mud Hens.

- Career statistics from Baseball Reference (Minors)

== Cristian Santana ==
Cristian Santana

Detroit Tigers
- Shortstop
- Born: November 25, 2003 (age 22); Azua, Dominican Republic
- Bats: Right Throws: Right

Cristian Andres Santana (born November 25, 2003) is a Dominican professional baseball shortstop in the Detroit Tigers organization.

Santana signed with the Detroit Tigers in January 2021. He received a $2.95 million signing bonus, the largest bonus ever paid by the Tigers to an international player. He spent the 2021 season playing in the Dominican Summer League, where he appeared in 54 games and compiled a .269 batting average with 9 home runs and 12 stolen bases.

He trained with Alan Trammell before the 2022 season and stated that, "if God allows me, I plan to be better than him." During the 2022 season, he appeared in 72 games for the Tigers' Single-A Lakeland Flying Tigers, compiling a .207 batting average and a .377 on-base percentage with 54 bases on balls, eight home runs and 10 stolen bases.

- Career statistics from Baseball Reference (Minors)

== Brady Smith ==
Brady Smith

Detroit Tigers
- Pitcher
- Born: January 27, 2005 (age 21); Knoxville, Tennessee, U.S.
- Bats: Right Throws: Right

Brady Scott Smith (born January 27, 2005) is an American professional baseball pitcher in the Detroit Tigers organization.

Smith attended Grainger High School in Rutledge, Tennessee. He was selected by the Los Angeles Dodgers in the third round of the 2023 Major League Baseball draft. Smith underwent Tommy John surgery and missed the 2024 season.

Smith made his professional debut in 2025 with the Arizona Complex League Dodgers and Rancho Cucamonga Quakes. He started 2026 with the Ontario Tower Buzzers before being promoted to the Great Lakes Loons.

On August 2, 2026, Smith along with Zyhir Hope and River Ryan were traded to the Detroit Tigers in exchange for Tarik Skubal.

- Career statistics from Baseball Reference (Minors)

== Full Triple-A to Rookie rosters ==
=== Triple-A ===
Toledo Mud Hens roster
Players		Coaches/Other
Pitchers: 44 Yoniel Curet; -- Yilber Diaz *; 43 Jack Flaherty *; -- Sawyer Gipson-Long; 38 Andre Granillo; -- Bailey Horn; 58 Hayden Minton; -- RJ Petit; 32 Jackson Wolf	Catchers: 20 Bennett Lee; 12 Carlos Perez *; 28 Seby Zavala; Infielders Outfielders: 3 Justice Bigbie	Manager: 40 Gary Jones; Coaches: 34 Doug Bochtler (pitching); 10 Francisco Contreras (hitting); 27 Mike Hessman (hitting); 25 Jimmy Robbins (bullpen); 7-day injured list; * On Detroit Tigers 40-man roster; ~ Development list; # Rehab assignment; ∞ Reserve list; ‡ Restricted list; § Suspended list; † Temporarily inactive list; Roster updated November 17, 2026; Transactions; → More rosters: MiLB • International League; → Detroit Tigers minor league players

=== Double-A ===
Erie SeaWolves roster
Players		Coaches/Other
Pitchers: 20 Max Alba; 32 Zane Barnhart; -- Garrett Burhenn; 38 Wandisson Charles; 41 Lucas Elissalt; 20 Colin Fields; 35 Dylan File; 49 Dariel Fregio; -- Jaden Hamm; 33 Marco Jimenez; 21 Tanner Kohlhepp; 27 Trevin Michael; 33 Jake Miller *; 40 Joe Miller; -- Joseph Montalvo; 31 Moises Rodriguez; 10 Kenny Serwa; 15 Eric Silva; 30 Johan Simon; 51 Luke Taggart	Catchers: 29 Ricardo Hurtado; 6 Luke Shliger; Infielders: 23 Clayton Campbell; 3 E.J. Exposito; 16 Woody Hadeen; 26 Andrew Jenkins; 37 Izaac Pacheco; 33 Viandel Pena; -- Jack Penney; Outfielders: 18 Roberto Campos; 36 Zyhir Hope; 11 Patrick Lee; 35 Chris Meyers; 35 Garrett Pennington; 1 Seth Stephenson	Manager: -- Tony Cappuccilli; Coaches: -- Nick Franklin (bench); -- Nick Green (pitching); -- Kyle MacKinnon (hitting); 7-day injured list; * On Detroit Tigers 40-man roster; ~ Development list; # Rehab assignment; ∞ Reserve list; ‡ Restricted list; § Suspended list; † Temporarily inactive list; Roster updated November 17, 2026; Transactions; → More rosters: MiLB • Eastern League; → Detroit Tigers minor league players

=== High-A ===
West Michigan Whitecaps roster
Players		Coaches/Other
Pitchers: 29 Logan Berrier; 31 Rayner Castillo; 9 Charlie Christensen; 38 Donye Evans; 32 Jalen Evans; 37 Connor Fenlong; 20 Luke Hoskins; 15 Preston Howey; 21 Jojo Ingrassia; 5 Ben Jacobs; 38 Zack Lee; 45 Maddox Long; 16 Carlos Marcano; 23 Kash Mayfield; 22 Eliseo Mota; 37 Gabriel Reyes; 18 Win Scott; 28 Ethan Sloan; 35 Brady Smith; 40 Luke Stofel; 34 Juanmi Vasquez; 27 Cale Wetwiska	Catchers: 3 Edian Espinal; Infielders: 33 Beau Ankeney; 1 Samuel Gil; 16 Jack Goodman; 14 Juan Hernandez; 2 Bryce Rainer; 36 Carson Rucker; 8 Cristian Santana; Outfielders: 11 Stephen Hrustich; 9 Nolan McCarthy; 26 Andrew Sojka; 13 Jackson Strong	Manager: 44 René Rivera; Coaches: 30 Matt Malott (hitting); 43 Daniel Ricabal (pitching); 10 Cole Roberts (bench); 7-day injured list; * On Detroit Tigers 40-man roster; ~ Development list; # Rehab assignment; ∞ Reserve list; ‡ Restricted list; § Suspended list; † Temporarily inactive list; Roster updated November 2, 2026; Transactions; → More rosters: MiLB • Midwest League; → Detroit Tigers minor league players

=== Single-A ===
Lakeland Flying Tigers roster
Players		Coaches/Other
Pitchers: 43 Bryce Alewine; 20 Jhonan Coba; 30 Aleiman Cruz; 21 Antonio Florido; 25 Cameron Flukey; 41 Yendy Gomez; 34 Frenny Grant; 26 Grayson Grinsell; 45 Xiomer Guacache; 9 Jose Guzman; 17 Owen Hall; -- River Hamilton; 32 Cash Kuiper; 7 Caleb Leys; 32 Michael Massey; -- Wuilberth Mendez; 60 Kelvis Salcedo; 57 Jorger Petri; 28 Carlos Rodriguez; 44 Johnathan Rogers; 40 Leonardo Rossel; 39 Joe Ruzicka; 17 Alistair Tanner; -- Shay Timmer; 46 Paul Wilson; 35 Malachi Witherspoon	Catchers: 24 Enderson Delgado; 27 Hunter Dobbins; 20 Michael Oliveto; Infielders: 33 Brady Ballinger; 8 Angel De Los Santos; 18 Tyson LeBlanc; 18 Maddox Molony; 7 Franyerber Montilla; 5 Javier Osorio; 22 Ronald Ramirez; 4 Jude Warwick; 19 Jordan Yost; Outfielders: 14 Nick Dumesnil; 37 Jesus Pinto; 22 Cris Rodriguez; 29 Anibal Salas	Manager: 67 Salvador Paniagua; Coaches: 31 Tyler Anderson (pitching); 12 Chris Gutierrez (bench); 51 Fred Landers (hitting); 7-day injured list; * On Detroit Tigers 40-man roster; ~ Development list; # Rehab assignment; ∞ Reserve list; ‡ Restricted list; § Suspended list; † Temporarily inactive list; Roster updated November 2, 2026; Transactions; → More rosters: MiLB • Florida State League; → Detroit Tigers minor league players

=== Rookie ===
Florida Complex League Tigers roster
Players		Coaches/Other
Pitchers: -- Edwin Alicea; 94 Jack Bushell; -- Jan Caraballo; -- Declan Dahl; -- Evan Dempsey; 99 Jatnk Diaz; -- Blake Dickerson; -- Kameron Douglas; -- Mitchell Evans; -- Eddy Felix; 89 Ryan Hall; 87 Trevor Heishman; -- Jett Johnson; -- Michael Lane; 85 Leonardo Leon; -- Drake Meeks; -- Dawson Price; -- Cade Rusch; -- Ethan Schiefelbein; 61 Zach Swanson; -- Jack Turner; -- KJ Ward; 51 Joey Wimpelberg	Catchers: 4 Steven Madero; 81 Gabriel Rosado; 8 Martin Tamara; -- Lance Trippel; Infielders: -- Will Adams; 31 Luis Aguilera; 37 Guillermo Batista; 52 Danandres Colon; 14 Jose Dickson; -- Meridian Leffew; -- Nestor Miranda; -- Jhonger Ochoa; -- Robert Omidi; 95 Maikol Orozco; -- Dominic Pellegrin; Outfielders: 80 Cristian Perez; 22 Santiago Pinto; 43 Josueth Quinonez; -- Tyler West	Manager: -- Brayan Peña; Coaches: -- Marcelo Alfonsin (pitching); 60 Rafael Gil (hitting); 36 Willians Moreno (pitching); -- Ben Steck (assistant); 7-day injured list; * On Detroit Tigers 40-man roster; ~ Development list; # Rehab assignment; ∞ Reserve list; ‡ Restricted list; § Suspended list; † Temporarily inactive list; Roster updated November 2, 2026; Transactions; → More rosters: MiLB • Florida Complex League; → Detroit Tigers minor league players

=== Foreign Rookie ===
Dominican Summer League Tigers 1 roster
Players		Coaches/Other
Pitchers: -- Gregory Amarante; -- Branell Anderson; 56 Yorsua Balanta; 84 Oliver Castillo; 62 Reymer Chourio; 77 Randy Constanza; 27 Santiago De Freitas; 88 Francisco De Sala; 45 Anderson Diaz; 65 Jesus Febles; -- Yunior Feliz; 88 Yeifry Francoi; -- Abraham Gomez; 87 Jefrey Gonzalez; 72 Omar Gonzalez; 90 Breimy Gueson; 67 Yowander Mercedes; 86 Miguel Molina; 58 Andres Ortiz; 79 Alexander Padilla; 41 Deibi Rodriguez; -- Henderson Salas; 87 Raibel Santana; 39 Jose Uribe; 65 Luis Vasquez; 75 Luis Villamizar	Catchers: 35 Carlos Benavides; 38 Fabian Dorta; 31 Armando Lao; 48 Howard Reyes; Infielders: 40 Kendrick Hernandez; 52 Edwinyer Martinez; 18 Enny Rodriguez; 8 Oscar Tineo; Outfielders: -- Emilio Gotz; 37 Adrian Hoyte; 19 Douglas Olivo; 10 Jose Ramirez; 28 Randy Santana	Manager: -- Marcos Yepez; Coaches: -- Rafael Acosta (pitching); -- Ivan Contreras (infield); -- Francisco Martinez (hitting); -- Jackson Pass (catching); -- Darwyn Zambrano (pitching); 7-day injured list; * On Detroit Tigers 40-man roster; ~ Development list; # Rehab assignment; ∞ Reserve list; ‡ Restricted list; § Suspended list; † Temporarily inactive list; Roster updated November 3, 2026; Transactions; → More rosters: MiLB • Dominican Summer League; → Detroit Tigers minor league players

Dominican Summer League Tigers 2 roster
Players		Coaches/Other
Pitchers: 82 Marco Arcia; 60 Alexander Bertiz; 69 Jeremy Cano; 51 Luis Castillo; 49 Ericksson De Los Santos; 46 Rafael Gonzalez; 51 Alfry Hernandez; 86 Edgar Leon; 76 Alexis Marinez; 57 Carlos Martinez; 50 Abelardo Medrano; 21 Jesus Miranda; 70 Donal Montas; 74 Dariel Morillo; 77 Raimi Mueses; 81 Yeury Ramirez; 78 Albert Ramos; 89 Franyerson Reyes; 71 Sheroky Rodriguez; 84 Kevin Tejada; 61 Sammy Zarraga	Catchers: 64 Manuel Bolivar; 36 Omar Bustamente; 17 Yojan Coronel; 32 Jeiker Gudino; 34 Angel Rodriguez; 25 Roman Silgado; Infielders: 30 Sterling Bazil; 9 Edgar Lugo; 12 Wagnel Luna; 44 Andy Mata; 33 Eduardo Tusen; Outfielders: 15 Willian Berti; 83 Raylin Castillo; 24 Jonathan Moya; 43 Diego Orro; 22 Samuell Sanchez; 20 Santiago Ventura	Manager: Sandy Acevedo; Coaches: -- Angel Cruz (infield); -- Kelly Ramos (catching); -- Omar Rosario (hitting); Roberto Yil (pitching); 7-day injured list; * On Detroit Tigers 40-man roster; ~ Development list; # Rehab assignment; ∞ Reserve list; ‡ Restricted list; § Suspended list; † Temporarily inactive list; Roster updated November 2, 2026; Transactions; → More rosters: MiLB • Dominican Summer League; → Detroit Tigers minor league players
