= Zyhir Hope =

American baseball player (born 2005)

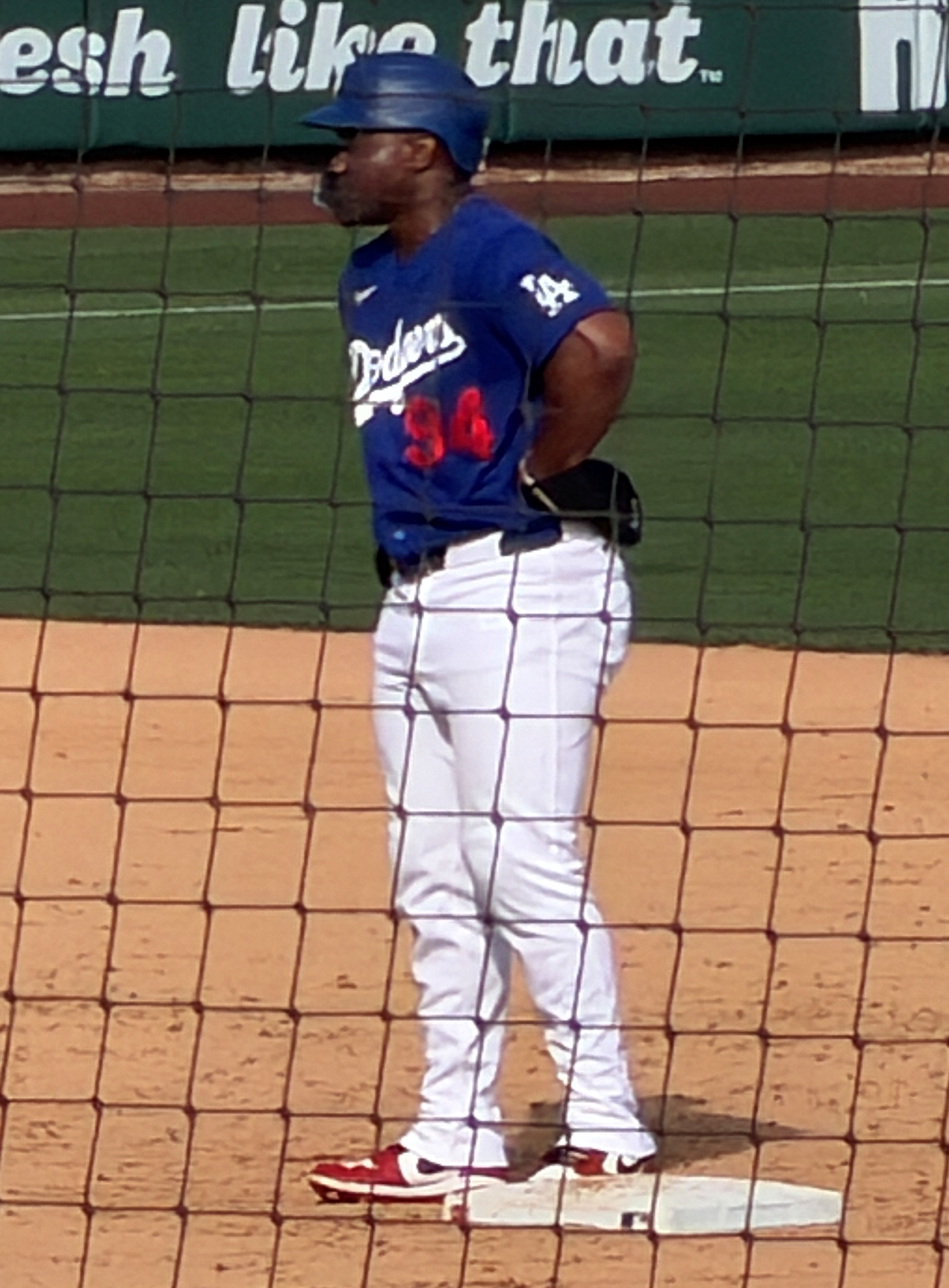
- Hope in 2026

Detroit Tigers
- Outfielder
- Born: January 19, 2005 (age 21); Chesapeake, Virginia, U.S.
- Bats: Left Throws: Left
- Stats at Baseball Reference

Zyhir Antonio Hope (born January 19, 2005) is an American professional baseball outfielder for the Detroit Tigers organization.

== Amateur career ==
Hope was raised in Elizabeth City, North Carolina, where he played Amateur Athletic Union baseball. His family moved to Maryland and California for his step-father's career in the military, returning to Virginia in 2018. Hope attended Colonial Forge High School in Stafford, Virginia, and committed to attend the University of North Carolina (UNC) to play college baseball. In his senior year, he had a .530 batting average with nine home runs and 29 stolen bases, and was named the high school baseball player of the year by The Free Lance-Star.

== Professional career ==
The Chicago Cubs selected Hope in the 11th round, with the 326th overall selection, of the 2023 MLB draft. Hope signed with the Cubs rather than enroll at UNC. On January 11, 2024, the Cubs traded Hope and Jackson Ferris to the Los Angeles Dodgers for Yency Almonte and Michael Busch. Hope was selected to participate in the inaugural "Spring Breakout" minor league showcase during spring training 2024. He was assigned to the Rancho Cucamonga Quakes of the California League for the season, where he hit .287 in 54 games with nine home runs despite missing three months with a shoulder injury. After the season, he was assigned to the Glendale Desert Dogs of the Arizona Fall League.

Hope was promoted to the High-A Great Lakes Loons to start the 2025 season. He was selected to represent the Dodgers organization at the 2025 All-Star Futures Game. In 121 games for the Loons, he batted .264 with 13 home runs, 75 RBI and 26 stolen bases. He was promoted to the Double–A Tulsa Drillers for the last couple weeks of the season and had six hits (including two doubles) in 19 at-bats over six games played. Hope remained with Tulsa for 2026, where he hit .293 with 23 home runs and 87 RBI in 94 games.

On August 2, 2026, Hope along with River Ryan and Brady Smith were traded to the Detroit Tigers in exchange for Tarik Skubal. The Tigers assigned Hope to the Erie Seawolves. After the season, he played for the Scottsdale Scorpions of the Arizona Fall League.
