= Gage Workman =

American baseball player (born 1999)

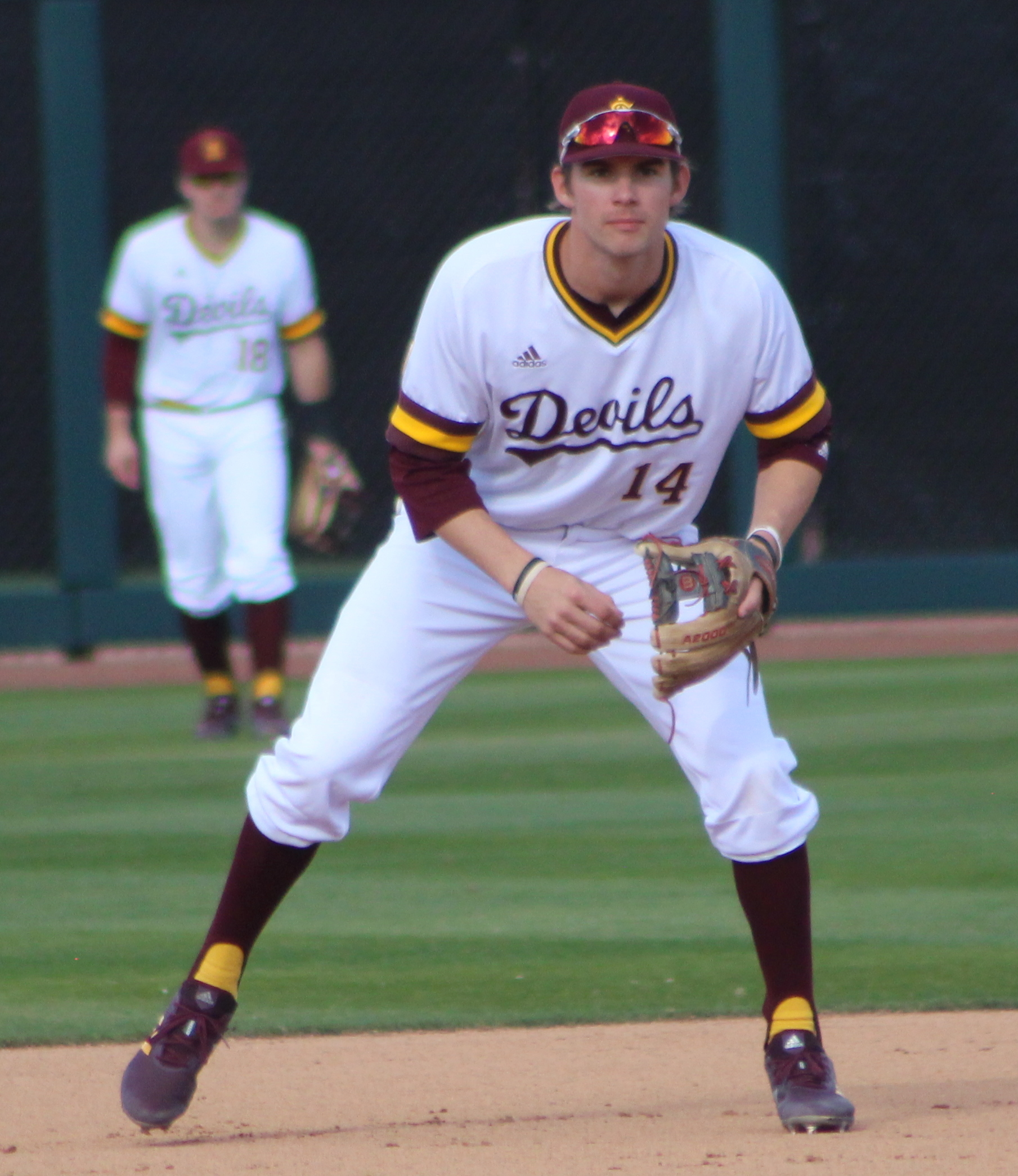
- Workman with Arizona State in 2019

San Diego Padres – No. 99
- Third baseman
- Born: October 24, 1999 (age 26); Chandler, Arizona, U.S.
- Bats: Left Throws: Right

MLB debut
- March 29, 2025, for the Chicago Cubs

MLB statistics (through 2026 season)
- Batting average: .175
- Home runs: 2
- Runs batted in: 10
- Stats at Baseball Reference

Teams
- Chicago Cubs (2025); Chicago White Sox (2025); Detroit Tigers (2026); San Diego Padres (2026–present)

Gage Tater Workman (born October 24, 1999) is an American professional baseball third baseman for the San Diego Padres of Major League Baseball (MLB). He has previously played in MLB for the Chicago Cubs, Chicago White Sox, and Detroit Tigers. He made his MLB debut in 2025.

== Amateur career ==
Workman attended Basha High School in Chandler, Arizona, where he played baseball with Brennen Davis. He was originally set to graduate in 2018, but reclassified to the class of 2017. In 2017, he had .396 batting average. Following the season, he was selected by the Milwaukee Brewers in the 14th round of the 2017 Major League Baseball draft, but did not sign, and instead chose to honor his commitment to play college baseball at Arizona State University.

In 2018, Workman's freshman season at Arizona EState, he appeared in fifty games (making 48 starts) in which he had a .276/ .339/.466 slash line with three home runs and 25 RBI. That summer, he played in the Cape Cod Baseball League for the Brewster Whitecaps, batting .241/.306/.547. As a sophomore in 2019, he slashed .330/.413/.528 with eight home runs, 42 RBI, and nine stolen bases over 57 games. He earned honorable mention for both the All-Pac-12 Conference team and the All-Pac-12 defensive team. He returned to play in the Cape Cod League for Brewster, batted .266/.321/.370, and was named an All-Star. Over 17 games as a junior in 2020, he batted .250/.316/.471 and compiled three home runs and 14 RBI before the college baseball season was cut short due to the COVID-19 pandemic.

== Professional career ==
=== Detroit Tigers ===
Workman was selected by the Detroit Tigers in the fourth round as the 102nd overall pick in the 2020 Major League Baseball draft, and signed. He did not play in a game in 2020 due to the cancellation of the minor league season because of the COVID-19 pandemic. To begin the 2021 season, Workman was assigned to the Lakeland Flying Tigers of the Low-A Southeast to make his professional debut. After slashing .256/.357/.426 with three home runs, 19 RBI, 16 doubles, and 22 stolen bases over 51 games, he was promoted to the West Michigan Whitecaps of the High-A Central in early July. Over 67 games with the Whitecaps, Workman batted .237/.302/.440 with nine home runs and 39 RBI.

Workman was assigned to the Erie SeaWolves of the Double-A Eastern League for the 2022 season. Over 128 games, he slashed .225/.276/.415 with 14 home runs, 68 RBI, thirty stolen bases, and thirty doubles. He was selected to play in the Arizona Fall League for the Salt River Rafters after the season, and batted .193/.230/.386. He split the 2023 season between Erie and West Michigan, hitting .239/.336/.409 with 13 home runs and 48 RBI over 100 games, playing primarily shortstop. Workman returned to Erie for the 2024 campaign, making 126 appearances and batting .280/.366/.476 with 18 home runs, 89 RBI, and 30 stolen bases.

=== Chicago Cubs ===
On December 11, 2024, the Chicago Cubs selected Workman from the Tigers in the Rule 5 draft. He made the Cubs' Opening Day roster and made his MLB debut on March 29, 2025. Workman recorded his first MLB hit on April 12, a double off Los Angeles Dodgers infielder Miguel Rojas in a 16-0 Cubs win. In nine appearances for Chicago, he went 3-for-14 (.214) with two RBI and one stolen base. On April 23, Workman was designated for assignment by the Cubs.

=== Chicago White Sox ===
On April 26, 2025, Workman was traded to the Chicago White Sox in exchange for cash considerations. On May 1, Workman was placed on the 10-day injured list with a right hip flexor strain, having only received two hitless plate appearances over three games. On May 12, Workman was activated off the injured list and subsequently designated for assignment. He had played in three games for the White Sox, going hitless across two at-bats.

=== Detroit Tigers (second stint) ===
On May 14, 2025, Workman was returned to the Detroit Tigers organization, where he was assigned to the Toledo Mud Hens of the Triple-A International League. He played in 86 games for Toledo and batted .229 with 15 home runs and 47 RBI over 86 games.

Workman was assigned to Toledo to start the 2026 season. On May 10, 2026, Workman's contract was selected by the Tigers and he was added to the active roster after Kerry Carpenter was placed on the injured list. Workman hit his first major league home run that same day, against Nick Mears of the Kansas City Royals. He was optioned back to Toledo after Carpenter was activated off the injured list on May 31. He played in a total of 82 games for Toledo in 2026 and hit .305 with 11 home runs and 35 RBI. With Detroit, Workman appeared in 16 games and batted .158 with two home runs and five RBI.

=== San Diego Padres ===
On August 3, 2026, Workman and Casey Mize were traded to the San Diego Padres for Kash Mayfield and Jackson Wolf. He played in two games for the Padres and recorded one hit across three at-bats. On August 9, Workman was optioned to the Triple-A El Paso Chihuahuas following the signing of Austin Hays and played the remainder of the season with the team, batting .216 with 15 RBI over 32 games.

== Personal life ==
Workman's father, Widd, also played baseball at Arizona State and spent four seasons in the minor leagues with the San Diego Padres. His middle name, "Tater," was his grandfather's nickname. Workman is a member of the Church of Jesus Christ of Latter-day Saints, and chose to skip his mission in order to continue playing college baseball without missing a season. He and his wife, Alexa, married in November 2020.

== See also ==
- Rule 5 draft results
