= Cristian Santana (footballer) =

Colombian footballer (born 1992)

Personal information
- Full name: Cristian David Bejarano Santana
- Date of birth: October 30, 1992 (age 33)
- Place of birth: Colombia
- Height: 1.68 m (5 ft 6 in)
- Position: Left wing

Senior career*
Years	Team	Apps	(Gls)
2011	AS Trenčín	1	(0)
2011–2013	Unión San Felipe		
2014	Rangers Talca		
- * Club domestic league appearances and goals as of 15 June 2011

Cristian David Bejarano Santana (born 30 October 1992) is a Colombian football midfielder. He made his debut for AS Trenčín against Slovan Duslo Šaľa on 28 May 2011.
