= Brayan Peña =

American baseball player & coach (born 1982)

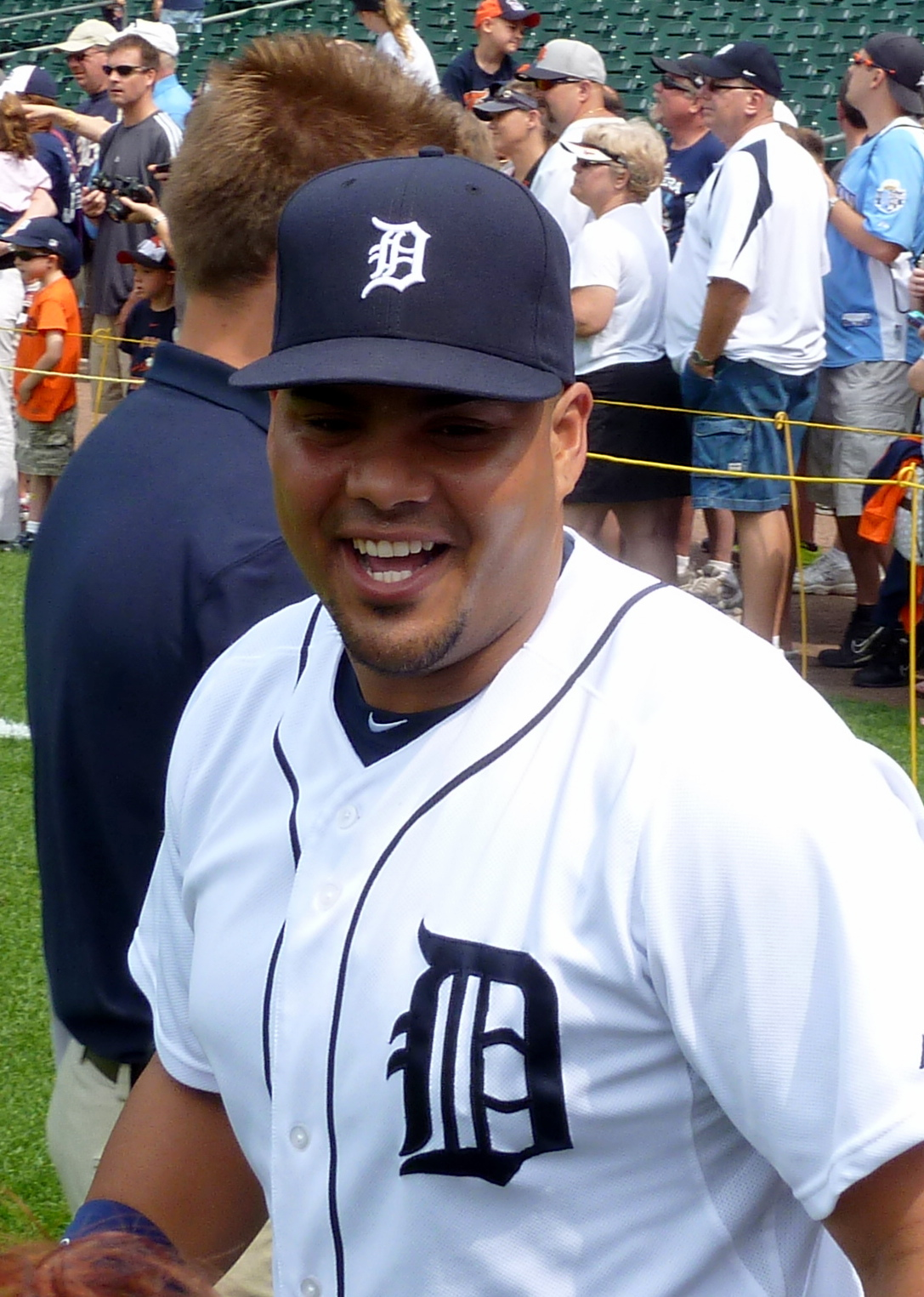
- Peña with the Detroit Tigers in 2013
- Catcher
- Born: January 7, 1982 (age 44); Havana, Cuba
- Batted: Switch Threw: Right

MLB debut
- May 23, 2005, for the Atlanta Braves

Last MLB appearance
- September 26, 2016, for the St. Louis Cardinals

MLB statistics
- Batting average: .259
- Home runs: 23
- Runs batted in: 164
- Stats at Baseball Reference

Teams
- Atlanta Braves (2005–2008); Kansas City Royals (2009–2012); Detroit Tigers (2013); Cincinnati Reds (2014–2015); St. Louis Cardinals (2016)

Brayan Eduardo Peña (born January 7, 1982) is a Cuban-American former professional baseball catcher. He played in Major League Baseball (MLB) for the Atlanta Braves, Kansas City Royals, Detroit Tigers, Cincinnati Reds and St. Louis Cardinals. He is currently the manager of the Detroit Tigers' affiliate, the West Michigan Whitecaps.

== Early years ==
Peña was born and raised in Havana, Cuba and was a member of the Cuba national under-18 baseball team. He graduated from Espa Julio Trigo. He grew up with professional baseball player Yunel Escobar.

Peña defected from Cuba while in Venezuela in 1999 and became an American citizen in 2009.

== Professional career ==
=== Atlanta Braves ===
Peña was called up to the big leagues early in the 2005 season because of an injury to Eddie Pérez. He made his debut on May 23, 2005 in an 8-6 home win over the New York Mets. Starting at catcher and batting seventh, Peña went 1-4 and scored a run. His first hit was a second-inning single off Kazuhisa Ishii. At the big-league level for the year, in 18 games he batted .179 with four runs batted in.

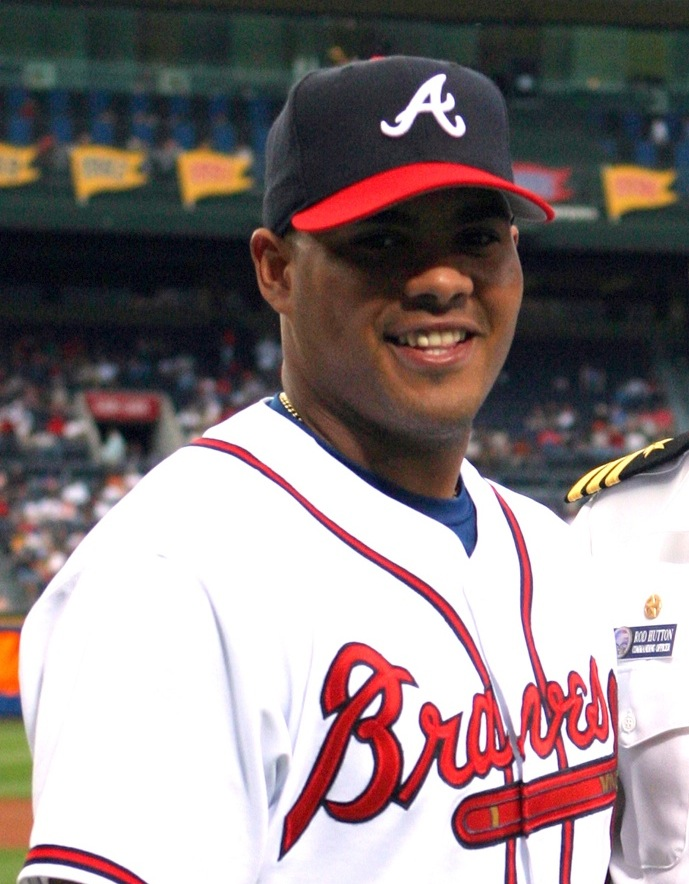
Peña during his tenure with the Atlanta Braves in 2005

For the next three seasons, 2006-2008, he saw part-time action for the Braves, playing in 23, 16 and 14 games, respectively, and totaling 22 hits including two home runs. On May 28, 2006, he hit his first Major League home run, a seventh-inning solo shot off Roberto Novoa in a 13-12 Braves win.

On May 23, 2008, the Braves designated Peña for assignment.

=== Kansas City Royals ===
On May 30, 2008, Peña was claimed off waivers by the Kansas City Royals. However, he was designated for assignment the next day, and did not appear in a game. He was promoted from the Triple–A Omaha Storm Chasers on May 31, 2009. He then saw his most big-league playing time to date, appearing in 64 games and batting .273 with six home runs and 18 RBI.

In 2010, he earned a spot in the big-league roster during spring training and spent the 2010 season backing up Jason Kendall. He looked to earn a spot as a starter for the future in the last month of the season, as Kendall was out due to injury. Peña received the bulk of the playing time behind the plate in September. For the season, he played in 60 games and batted .253 with one homer and 19 RBI.

In 2011, Peña shared starting catching duty with Matt Treanor. By the end of the season, he served as the backup to Salvador Pérez. He played in a then career-high 72 games, batting .248 with three homers and 24 RBI.

On January 16, 2012, Peña signed a one-year deal for $875,000 with the Royals, avoiding arbitration in the process. On the season, he batted .236 with two homers and 25 RBI.

On November 20, 2012, the Royals designated Peña for assignment as they made room on the 40-man roster ahead of the Rule 5 draft.

=== Detroit Tigers ===
On December 10, 2012, Peña signed a one-year contract with the Detroit Tigers and was the backup for Alex Avila during the 2013 season. He played in 71 games in 2013, and posted the best batting average of his career at .297 to go with four home runs and 22 RBIs.

=== Cincinnati Reds ===
On November 12, 2013, Peña and the Cincinnati Reds agreed to terms on a two-year contract, covering the 2014 and 2015 seasons. In 2014 Peña shared playing time with catcher Devin Mesoraco and played first base while first baseman Joey Votto was injured. By the 2014 all-star break, Peña was on his way to a career year, playing in 65 games and batting .250 with three home runs, 17 RBI and an already career-best 12 doubles. On November 2, 2015, Peña became a free agent.

=== St. Louis Cardinals ===
On November 30, 2015, Peña agreed to a two-year, $5 million contract with the St. Louis Cardinals to be the primary backup to Yadier Molina. In mid-December 2015, Peña accompanied an expedition to Cuba composed of former Cardinals including Joe Torre and Jon Jay, and other MLB officials and players. It was MLB's first visit there since 1999, and one anticipated as an important step to help normalize relations with the United States that had begun to ease earlier in the year. He began the season on the DL after surgery to remove loose cartilage in his left knee, which he attributed to slipping on the dugout steps in spring training. On July 5, 2016, Peña announced that he was planning to join the Army Reserve after the 2016 season. Later that day though, he was informed that he was unable to enlist because such an action would violate the terms of his contract. Peña chose to become an ambassador for the troops instead. On November 21, 2016, the Cardinals designated Peña for assignment.

=== Kansas City Royals (second stint) ===
On February 7, 2017, Peña signed a minor league contract with the Kansas City Royals that included an invitation to spring training. In 43 games for the Triple–A Omaha Storm Chasers, he hit .274/.308/.298 with no home runs and 15 RBI. Peña elected free agency following the season on November 6.

=== Detroit Tigers (second stint) ===
On January 9, 2018, the Detroit Tigers signed Peña to a minor league contract with an invitation to spring training. He was released on June 11. Peña announced his retirement from professional baseball on June 18.

== Coaching career ==
Peña served as the manager of the Detroit Tigers' rookie-level affiliate, the Gulf Coast League Tigers, who won the Gulf Coast League Championship in 2018. During the 2019 season, he served as manager of the Low–A Connecticut Tigers. On November 12, 2019, he was named manager of the West Michigan Whitecaps.

On February 2, 2026, Peña was announced as the manager for the Florida Complex League Tigers, Detroit's rookie-level affiliate.

== See also ==
- List of baseball players who defected from Cuba
