= Florida Complex League Tigers =

- (1968, 1995–present); Lakeland, Florida

| Team logo | Cap insignia |

Minor league affiliations
- Class: Rookie
- League: Florida Complex League
- Division: North Division
- Previous leagues: Gulf Coast League (1968, 1995–2020)

Major league affiliations
- Team: Detroit Tigers

Minor league titles
- League titles (2): 2018; 2024
- Division titles (5): 1995; 2006; 2012; 2015; 2018

Team data
- Name: FCL Tigers East & West
- Previous names: GCL Tigers East & West (2016–2020); GCL Tigers (1968, 1995–2015)
- Ballpark: Joker Marchant Stadium
- Owner/ Operator: Detroit Tigers

The Florida Complex League Tigers are a Rookie-level affiliate of the Detroit Tigers, competing in the Florida Complex League of Minor League Baseball. Prior to 2021, the team was known as the Gulf Coast League Tigers. The team plays its home games at Joker Marchant Stadium in Lakeland, Florida. The team is composed mainly of players who are in their first year of professional baseball either as draftees or non-drafted free agents from the United States, Canada, Dominican Republic, Venezuela, and various other countries.

== History ==
The team first played in the Gulf Coast League (GCL) during the 1968 season. After then being absent for over 25 years, the team returned to the league in 1995 and has competed continuously since then.

Starting with the 2016 season, the team has fielded two squads in the league, differentiated with "East" and "West" suffixes. The second team was created due to the cancellation of the Venezuelan Summer League, which left the Tigers with a roster full of players with no team. Most of these players were assigned to one of the two GCL squads, although some were assigned to the Tigers affiliate in the Dominican Summer League.

Prior to the 2021 season, the Gulf Coast League was renamed as the Florida Complex League (FCL).

== Rosters ==
Florida Complex League Tigers roster
| Players | Coaches/Other |
|---|---|
| Pitchers: 18 Bryce Alewine; 94 Jack Bushell; 66 Jhonan Coba; 78 Aleiman Cruz; 44 Omari Daniel; 99 Jatnk Diaz; -- Blake Dickerson; -- Kameron Douglas; 28 Pedro Garcia; 46 Frenny Grant; 90 Owen Hall; 89 Ryan Hall; 85 Leonardo Leon; 7 Carlos Rodriguez; 32 Leonardo Rossel; 68 Joe Ruzicka #; -- Zach Swanson; 35 Yoan Valdez; 98 Paul Wilson #; -- Joey Wimpelberg; Catchers: 86 Enderson Delgado; 4 Steven Madero; 20 Michael Oliveto #; 40 Newremberg Rondon; 81 Gabriel Rosado; 8 Martin Tamara; Infielders: 31 Luis Aguilera; 21 Angel De Los Santos; 14 Jose Dickson; -- Meridian Leffew; 95 Maikol Orozco; 49 Ronald Ramirez; Outfielders: 57 Patrick Lee #; 87 Nolan McCarthy #; 80 Cristian Perez; 22 Santiago Pinto; 43 Josueth Quinonez; 65 Cris Rodriguez | Manager: -- Brayan Peña; Coaches: -- Marcelo Alfonsin (pitching); 60 Rafael Gil (hitting); 36 Willians Moreno (pitching); -- Ben Steck (assistant); 60-day injured list: -- Gregory Amarante; -- Branell Anderson; -- Guillermo Batista; 52 Danandres Colon; -- Mitchell Evans; -- Eddy Felix; -- Abraham Gomez; 87 Trevor Heishman; -- Jhonger Ochoa (full season); -- Nestor Miranda; -- Dawson Price (full season); -- Ethan Schiefelbein (full season); 7-day injured list; * On Detroit Tigers 40-man roster; ~ Development list; # Rehab assignment; ∞ Reserve list; ‡ Restricted list; § Suspended list; † Temporarily inactive list; Roster updated June 19, 2026; Transactions; → More rosters: MiLB • Florida Complex League; → Detroit Tigers minor league players |

== Season-by-season ==
| Year | Record | Finish | Manager | Playoffs |
|---|---|---|---|---|
| 1968 | 27-36 | 7th | Wayne Blackburn | No playoffs until 1983 |
| 1995 | 33-24 | 6th | Kevin Bradshaw | Lost League Finals vs. GCL Royals (2 games to 0); Won in first round vs. GCL Marlins (1 game to 0) |
| 1996 | 26-34 | 12th | Kevin Bradshaw | |
| 1997 | 31-29 | 7th | Kevin Bradshaw | |
| 1998 | 28-32 | 8th(t) | Kevin Bradshaw | |
| 1999 | 29-31 | 8th(t) | Gary Green | |
| 2000 | 34-26 | 5th(t) | Kevin Bradshaw | |
| 2001 | 34-26 | 5th | Howard Bushong | |
| 2002 | 23-37 | 13th | Howard Bushong | |
| 2003 | 28-29 | 5th | Howard Bushong | |
| 2004 | 24-36 | 9th | Kevin Bradshaw | |
| 2005 | 24-30 | 9th(t) | Kevin Bradshaw | |
| 2006 | 32-18 | 2nd | Kevin Bradshaw | Lost in 1st round vs. GCL Dodgers (1 game to 0) |
| 2007 | 28-32 | 9th(t) | Benny Castillo | |
| 2008 | 27-31 | 12th | Basilio Cabrera | |
| 2009 | 29-31 | 9th | Basilio Cabrera | |
| 2010 | 29-30 | 9th | Basilio Cabrera | |
| 2011 | 29-31 | 7th | Basilio Cabrera | |
| 2012 | 36-24 | 1st(t) | Basilio Cabrera | Lost in 1st round vs. GCL Red Sox (1 game to 0) |
| 2013 | 32-28 | 5th | Basilio Cabrera | |
| 2014 | 34-25 | 6th | Basilio Cabrera | |
| 2015 | 36-23 | 3rd | Basilio Cabrera | Lost in 1st round vs. GCL Blue Jays (1 game to 0) |

=== GCL Tigers East ===
| Year | Record | Finish | Manager | Playoffs |
|---|---|---|---|---|
| 2016 | 21-37 | 16th | Rafael Gil | |
| 2017 | 14-45 | 17th | Jesus Garces | |
| 2018 | 26-28 | 10th | Luis López | |
| 2019 | 19-29 | 14th | Luis López | Playoffs cancelled due to Hurricane Dorian |

=== GCL Tigers West ===
| Year | Record | Finish | Manager | Playoffs |
|---|---|---|---|---|
| 2016 | 30-28 | 7th | Rafael Martinez | |
| 2017 | 29-28 | 9th | Rafael Gil | |
| 2018 | 37-16 | 2nd | Brayan Peña | League champions vs. GCL Cardinals(2 games to 1); Won in first round vs. GCL Red Sox (1 game to 0) |
| 2019 | 30-20 | 3rd | Gary Cathcart | Playoffs cancelled due to Hurricane Dorian |
