= 2022 Detroit Tigers season =

Major League Baseball season

2022 Detroit Tigers
- League: American League
- Division: Central
- Ballpark: Comerica Park
- City: Detroit, Michigan
- Record: 66–96 (.407)
- Divisional place: 4th
- Owners: Christopher Ilitch; Ilitch family trust
- President of baseball operations: Scott Harris (from Sep. 19)
- General managers: Al Avila (through Aug. 10)
- Managers: A. J. Hinch
- Television: Bally Sports Detroit (Matt Shepard, Kirk Gibson, Jack Morris, Craig Monroe, Dan Petry)
- Radio: Detroit Tigers Radio Network (Dan Dickerson, Jim Price, Alex Avila, Austin Jackson, Craig Monroe, Dan Petry)
- Stats: ESPN.com; Baseball Reference

The 2022 Detroit Tigers season was the team's 122nd season and the 23rd at Comerica Park. This was the Tigers' second season under manager A. J. Hinch. Opening Day was held on April 8 and they hosted their divisional rival, the Chicago White Sox and the season ended on the road against the Seattle Mariners on October 5. The team wore KB patches in honor of former Tigers player and coach Kimera Bartee who died on December 20, 2021, at the age of 49.

On August 10, after accumulating a 43–68 record, the Tigers fired General Manager Al Avila after 21 seasons with the team. On September 19, the Tigers hired former San Francisco Giants General Manager Scott Harris as their new President of Baseball Operations.

The Tigers finished the season at 66–96, fourth place in their division, and failed to make the playoffs for the eighth consecutive season, tied with the Los Angeles Angels for the longest active playoff drought in the American League and Major League Baseball. Statistically, the Tigers were one of the worst-hitting teams in baseball this season. Their .231 team batting average ranked 25th in the majors, while the team finished dead last (30th) in home runs with 110.

== Offseason ==
=== Lockout ===
The expiration of the league's collective bargaining agreement (CBA) with the Major League Baseball Players Association occurred on December 1, 2021, with no new agreement in place. As a result, the team owners voted unanimously to lockout the players stopping all free agency and trades. The next day, Commissioner of Baseball Rob Manfred announced a lockout of players, following expiration of the collective bargaining agreement (CBA) between the league and the Major League Baseball Players Association (MLBPA). On March 10, 2022, the MLB and MLBPA agreed to a new collective bargaining agreement, thus ending the lockout. Although MLB previously announced that several series would be cancelled due to the lockout, the agreement provides for a 162-game season, with originally cancelled games to be made up via doubleheaders.

=== Rule changes ===
Pursuant to the new CBA, several new rules were instituted for the 2022 season:

- The National League will adopt the designated hitter full-time.
- The postseason will expand from ten teams to twelve.
- Advertising patches and decals will appear on player uniforms and helmets for the first time.
- Due to the shortened spring training, teams will be able to carry 28 players from the start of the 2022 regular season through May 1. After May 1, teams must reduce their rosters to 26 players.

Also, a draft lottery will be implemented, beginning with the 2023 draft.

=== Coaching staff ===
- On January 27, 2022, the Tigers promoted Toledo Mud Hens manager Gary Jones to first base coach for the major league team, succeeding Kimera Bartee who died suddenly in late 2021. Former Tigers hitting coach Lloyd McClendon was hired to succeed Jones as Toledo Mud Hens manager.

=== Trades ===
- On November 3, the Tigers traded minor-league infielder Nick Quintana to the Cincinnati Reds in exchange for catcher Tucker Barnhart. On November 7, the Tigers exercised Barnhart's $7.5 million contract option for the 2022 season, signing him to the team.
- On April 4, the Tigers traded infielder Isaac Paredes and a competitive balance round B pick in the 2022 MLB draft to the Tampa Bay Rays in exchange for outfielder Austin Meadows.
- On April 13, the Tigers acquired minor-league utility player Jamie Westbrook from the Milwaukee Brewers in exchange for cash considerations and assigned him to the Toledo Mud Hens.
- On August 2, the Tigers traded outfielder Robbie Grossman to the Atlanta Braves for pitcher Kris Anglin.
- On August 2, the Tigers traded pitcher Michael Fulmer to the Minnesota Twins for pitcher Sawyer Gipson-Long.
- On August 14, the Tigers acquired minor league pitcher Ricardo Sánchez from the Philadelphia Phillies for cash considerations.

=== Signings ===
- On November 7, the Tigers selected the minor-league contract of pitcher Elvin Rodríguez, adding him to the 40-man roster.
- On November 16, the Tigers signed pitcher Eduardo Rodríguez to a five-year/$77 million contract, with an opt-out clause after the 2023 season.
- On November 19, the Tigers selected the minor-league contracts of infielder Kody Clemens and pitcher Ángel De Jesús, adding them to the 40-man roster.
- On December 1, the Tigers signed infielder Javier Báez to a six-year, $140 million contract.
- On December 1, the Tigers signed pitcher Jacob Barnes to a minor-league contract with an invitation to spring training. His contract was selected prior to opening day.
- On February 1, the Tigers signed pitcher Luis Castillo to a minor league contract. His contract was selected on August 6.
- On March 16, the Tigers signed pitcher Andrew Chafin to a two-year, $13 million contract.
- On March 19, the Tigers signed pitcher Michael Pineda to a one-year, $5.5 million contract.
- On March 22, the Tigers reached one-year contract agreements with infielders Jeimer Candelario ($5.8 million) and Harold Castro ($1.275 million), outfielder Víctor Reyes ($1.4 million), catcher Dustin Garneau ($1.175 million), and pitchers Michael Fulmer ($4.95 million), Joe Jiménez ($1.79 million) and José Cisnero ($1.9 million), avoiding arbitration with all players.
- On April 14, the Tigers signed pitchers Derek Law and Bubba Derby to minor-league contracts. Law's contract was selected on July 30.
- On July 19, the Tigers signed pitcher Chi Chi Gonzalez to a minor league contract. On August 26, he opted out of that contract. He signed a minor league contract with the New York Yankees on August 31.
- On July 26, the Tigers signed pitcher Daniel Norris to a minor-league contract. His contract was selected on August 12.
- On September 9, the Tigers signed pitcher Daniel Ponce de Leon to a minor league contract.

=== Releases ===
- On October 6, outfielder JaCoby Jones declined a minor-league assignment and declared free agency. Jones subsequently signed a minor-league contract with the Kansas City Royals.
- On November 3, pitchers Wily Peralta, Julio Teherán, José Ureña and Derek Holland declared free agency. On March 16, Peralta re-signed with the Tigers on a minor-league contract that includes an invitation to spring training. On March 18, Holland signed a minor-league contract with the Boston Red Sox that includes an invitation to spring training. On March 29, Ureña signed with the Milwaukee Brewers. On April 21, Teherán signed with the Staten Island FerryHawks of the Atlantic League of Professional Baseball.
- On November 5, pitchers Drew Hutchison and Ian Krol were outrighted to the minors. Both players declined their minor-league assignments and declared free agency. On March 14, Hutchison re-signed with the Tigers on a minor-league deal, with an invitation to spring training. On March 18, Krol signed a minor-league contract with the San Diego Padres.
- On November 9, pitcher Locke St. John declared free agency. On November 29, St. John signed a minor-league contract with the Chicago Cubs.
- On November 9, outfielder Christin Stewart declined a minor-league assignment and declared free agency. Stewart subsequently signed a minor-league contract with the Boston Red Sox.
- On November 19, the Tigers cut utility player Niko Goodrum from the 40-man roster, outrighting him to the minor-leagues. Goodrum cleared waivers and became a free agent. The Tigers also removed outfielder Jacob Robson and pitcher Nivaldo Rodríguez from the 40-man roster, outrighting each player to Triple-A Toledo. On March 15, Goodrum signed with the Houston Astros.
- On November 29, catcher Grayson Greiner cleared waivers and elected free agency. On March 14, Greiner signed a minor-league contract with the Arizona Diamondbacks that included an invitation to spring training.
- On November 30, pitcher Matthew Boyd was not tendered a contract and became a free agent. On March 20, 2022, Boyd finalized a contract with the San Francisco Giants on a one-year contract worth $5.2 million plus incentive bonuses.
- On May 13, pitcher Drew Hutchison declined a minor-league assignment and declared free agency. On May 23, he signed a minor-league contract with the Tigers and rejoined the team on June 14. After being designated for assignment and electing free agency, Hutchison once again signed a minor-league contract with the Tigers on June 27. He rejoined the team on July 5.
- On June 14, pitcher Jacob Barnes was designated for assignment. After electing free agency, Barnes signed a minor-league contract with the Seattle Mariners on June 22. After being released by the Mariners, Barnes signed a minor league contract with the Tigers on July 26. After being released from his contract on August 26, Barnes signed a minor league contract with the New York Yankees on August 31.
- On August 1, outfielder Derek Hill was designated for assignment. He was claimed off waivers by the Seattle Mariners on August 5.
- On August 5, pitcher Derek Law was designated for assignment. On August 14, he signed a minor league contract with the Cincinnati Reds.
- On August 19, pitcher Wily Peralta was designated for assignment. He was released on August 22. On February 3, 2023, he signed a minor league contract with the Washington Nationals with an invitation to spring training.
- On September 4, pitcher Michael Pineda was designated for assignment. He was released on September 7.

== Season standings ==
=== American League Central ===
AL Central
Team	W	L	Pct.	GB	Home	Road
Cleveland Guardians	92	70	.568	—	46‍–‍35	46‍–‍35
Chicago White Sox	81	81	.500	11	37‍–‍44	44‍–‍37
Minnesota Twins	78	84	.481	14	46‍–‍35	32‍–‍49
Detroit Tigers	66	96	.407	26	36‍–‍46	30‍–‍50
Kansas City Royals	65	97	.401	27	39‍–‍42	26‍–‍55

=== American League Wild ===
Division leaders
Team	W	L	Pct.
Houston Astros	106	56	.654
New York Yankees	99	63	.611
Cleveland Guardians	92	70	.568

Wild Card teams (Top 3 teams qualify for postseason)
Team	W	L	Pct.	GB
Toronto Blue Jays	92	70	.568	+6
Seattle Mariners	90	72	.556	+4
Tampa Bay Rays	86	76	.531	—
Baltimore Orioles	83	79	.512	3
Chicago White Sox	81	81	.500	5
Minnesota Twins	78	84	.481	8
Boston Red Sox	78	84	.481	8
Los Angeles Angels	73	89	.451	13
Texas Rangers	68	94	.420	18
Detroit Tigers	66	96	.407	20
Kansas City Royals	65	97	.401	21
Oakland Athletics	60	102	.370	26

=== Record against opponents ===
2022 American League record Source: MLB Standings Grid – 2022
Team	BAL	BOS	CWS	CLE	DET	HOU	KC	LAA	MIN	NYY	OAK	SEA	TB	TEX	TOR	NL
Baltimore	—	9–10	5–2	3–3	1–5	4–3	4–3	6–1	3–4	7–12	3–4	2–4	9–10	6–0	9–10	12–8
Boston	10–9	—	2–4	5–2	5–1	4–2	3–4	4–3	3–4	6–13	5–1	6–1	7–12	6–1	3–16	9–11
Chicago	2–5	4–2	—	7–12	12–7	3–4	9–10	3–4	9–10	3–4	5–2	4–2	4–2	3–4	2–4	11–9
Cleveland	3–3	2–5	12–7	—	10–9	3–4	12–7	3–4	13–6	1–5	6–1	1–6	4–2	5–1	5–2	12–8
Detroit	5–1	1–5	7–12	9–10	—	0–7	10–9	3–3	8–11	1–5	2–5	1–6	2–5	4–3	2–5	11–9
Houston	3–4	2–4	4–3	4–3	7–0	—	5–2	13–6	6–0	5–2	12–7	12–7	5–1	14–5	2–4	12–8
Kansas City	3–4	4–3	10–9	7–12	9–10	2–5	—	3–3	7–12	1–6	3–3	2–4	3–4	2–4	2–5	7–13
Los Angeles	1–6	3–4	4–3	4–3	3–3	6–13	3–3	—	4–2	2–4	12–7	10–9	2–5	9–10	3–4	7–13
Minnesota	4–3	4–3	10–9	6–13	11–8	0–6	12–7	2–4	—	2–5	5–1	4–3	4–2	2–5	4–3	8–12
New York	12–7	13–6	4–3	5–1	5–1	2–5	6–1	4–2	5–2	—	5–2	2–4	11–8	4–3	11–8	10–10
Oakland	4–3	1–5	2–5	1–6	5–2	7–12	3–3	7–12	1–5	2–5	—	8–11	3–4	8–11	3–3	5–15
Seattle	4–2	1–6	2–4	6–1	6–1	7–12	4–2	9–10	3–4	4–2	11–8	—	2–5	14–5	5–2	12–8
Tampa Bay	10–9	12–7	2–4	2–4	5–2	1–5	4–3	5–2	2–4	8–11	4–3	5–2	—	4–3	10–9	12–8
Texas	0–6	1–6	4–3	1–5	3–4	5–14	4–2	10–9	5–2	3–4	11–8	5–14	3–4	—	2–4	11–9
Toronto	10–9	16–3	4–2	2–5	5–2	4–2	5–2	4–3	3–4	8–11	3–3	2–5	9–10	4–2	—	13–7

Updated with the results of all games through October 5, 2022.

== Season highlights ==
=== Individual accomplishments ===
==== Hitting ====
- On April 23, Miguel Cabrera became the 33rd player in MLB history to join the 3,000-hit club. He was the third Tigers player to do so, after Ty Cobb and Al Kaline, and the first Venezuelan to reach the milestone.
- On May 7, Miguel Cabrera recorded his 600th career double. He became the third player in MLB history to record 3,000 hits, 600 doubles, and 500 home runs, following Hank Aaron and Albert Pujols.
- On July 2, Riley Greene hit a walk-off home run for his first career MLB home run. He became the first Tigers player since Lou Whitaker in 1978 to accomplish this feat.

== Game log ==
2022 Game Log: 66–96 (Home 35–46, Road 31–50)
April: 7–13 (Home 4–8, Road 3–5)

#	Date	Opponent	Score	Win	Loss	Save	Attendance	Record	Streak
1	April 8	White Sox	5–4	**Soto** (1–0)	Hendriks (0–1)	—	43,480	1–0	W1
2	April 9	White Sox	2–5	Cease (1–0)	**Mize** (0–1)	Bummer (1)	17,469	1–1	L1
3	April 10	White Sox	1–10	Crick (1–0)	**Skubal** (0–1)	—	15,712	1–2	L2
4	April 11	Red Sox	3–1	**Fulmer** (1–0)	Davis (0–1)	**Soto** (1)	11,840	2–2	W1
5	April 12	Red Sox	3–5	Whitlock (1–0)	**Lange** (0–1)	—	15,781	2–3	L1
6	April 13	Red Sox	7–9	Eovaldi (1–0)	**Ed. Rodríguez** (0–1)	Robles (1)	10,522	2–4	L2
7	April 14	@ Royals	4–2	**Jiménez** (1–0)	Brentz (0–2)	**Soto** (2)	9,595	3–4	W1
8	April 15	@ Royals	2–1	**Barnes** (1–0)	Keller (0–1)	**Fulmer** (1)	16,720	4–4	W2
9	April 16	@ Royals	1–3	Snider (2–0)	**Vest** (0–1)	Staumont (1)	19,022	4–5	L1
—	April 17	@ Royals	Postponed (inclement weather). Rescheduled to July 11.						
10	April 19	Yankees	2–4	Schmidt (1–2)	**Alexander** (0–1)	Chapman (2)	15,490	4–6	L2
11	April 20	Yankees	3–5	Green (1–1)	**Hutchison** (0–1)	Chapman (3)	17,268	4–7	L3
12	April 21	Yankees	3–0	**Pineda** (1–0)	Montgomery (0–1)	**Soto** (3)	21,529	5–7	W1
—	April 22	Rockies	Postponed (inclement weather). Rescheduled to April 23.						
13	April 23	Rockies	13–0	**Skubal** (1–1)	Senzatela (1–1)	—	37,566	6–7	W2
14	April 23	Rockies	2–3	Gomber (1–1)	**Brieske** (0–1)	Colomé (2)	28,635	6–8	L1
15	April 24	Rockies	2–6	Kuhl (1–0)	**Alexander** (0–2)	—	20,088	6–9	L2
16	April 26	@ Twins	4–5	Jax (1–0)	**Soto** (1–1)	—	11,803	6–10	L3
17	April 27	@ Twins	0–5	Ryan (3–1)	**Pineda** (1–1)	—	11,829	6–11	L4
18	April 28	@ Twins	1–7	Stashak (1–0)	**Skubal** (1–2)	Jax (1)	19,365	6–12	L5
19	April 29	@ Dodgers	1–5	Anderson (2–0)	**Alexander** (0–3)	—	49,394	6–13	L6
20	April 30	@ Dodgers	5–1	**Barnes** (2–0)	Phillips (1–1)	—	52,613	7–13	W1

May: 12–17 (Home 8–7, Road 4–10)

#	Date	Opponent	Score	Win	Loss	Save	Attendance	Record	Streak
21	May 1	@ Dodgers	3–6	Buehler (3–1)	**Ed. Rodríguez** (0–2)	Kimbrel (4)	51,172	7–14	L1
—	May 3	Pirates	Postponed (inclement weather). Rescheduled to May 4.						
22	May 4	Pirates	3–2	**Lange** (1–1)	Wilson (0–1)	**Soto** (4)	15,150	8–14	W1
23	May 4	Pirates	2–7	Thompson (1–3)	**Hutchison** (0–2)	Bednar (2)	15,150	8–15	L1
24	May 5	@ Astros	2–3	Pressly (1–1)	**Soto** (1–2)	—	24,116	8–16	L2
25	May 6	@ Astros	2–3	García (2–1)	**Brieske** (0–2)	Montero (3)	38,020	8–17	L3
26	May 7	@ Astros	2–3	Abreu (1–0)	**Fulmer** (1–1)	Pressly (4)	34,109	8–18	L4
27	May 8	@ Astros	0–5	Odorizzi (3–2)	**Hutchison** (0–3)	—	36,934	8–19	L5
28	May 9	Athletics	0–2	Blackburn (4–0)	**Pineda** (1–2)	Jiménez (5)	12,674	8–20	L6
29	May 10	@ Athletics	6–0	**Skubal** (2–2)	Montas (2–3)	—	13,844	9–20	W1
30	May 10	Athletics	1–4	Martínez (1–0)	**Faedo** (0–1)	—	13,844	9–21	L1
31	May 11	Athletics	0–9	Logue (2–1)	**Wentz** (0–1)	—	15,375	9–22	L2
32	May 12	Athletics	3–5	Puk (1–0)	**Fulmer** (1–2)	Jiménez (6)	17,565	9–23	L3
33	May 13	Orioles	4–2	**Ed. Rodríguez** (1–2)	Lyles (2–3)	**Vest** (1)	23,941	10–23	W1
34	May 14	Orioles	3–0	**Peralta** (1–0)	Zimmermann (2–2)	**Soto** (5)	28,016	11–23	W2
35	May 15	Orioles	5–1	**Skubal** (3–2)	Wells (1–3)	—	20,080	12–23	W3
36	May 16	@ Rays	3–2	**Fulmer** (2–2)	Kittredge (3–1)	**Soto** (6)	11,532	13–23	W4
37	May 17	@ Rays	1–8	McClanahan (3–2)	**Brieske** (0–3)	—	8,475	13–24	L1
38	May 18	@ Rays	1–6	Rasmussen (4–1)	**Ed. Rodríguez** (1–3)	—	9,706	13–25	L2
39	May 20	@ Guardians	1–6	Civale (2–3)	**Barnes** (3–1)	—	23,874	13–26	L3
—	May 21	@ Guardians	Postponed (inclement weather). Rescheduled to July 14.						
40	May 22	@ Guardians	4–2	**Faedo** (1–1)	Bieber (1–3)	**Soto** (7)	15,554	14–26	W1
41	May 23	@ Twins	4–5	Pagán (1–1)	**Chafin** (0–1)	—	16,361	14–27	L1
42	May 24	@ Twins	0–2	Gray (2–1)	**Brieske** (0–4)	Durán (4)	17,882	14–28	L2
43	May 25	@ Twins	4–2 (10)	**Lange** (1–1)	Megill (0–1)	**Chafin** (1)	20,375	15–28	W1
44	May 26	Guardians	4–3	**Soto** (2–2)	Stephan (2–2)	—	12,764	16–28	W2
—	May 27	Guardians	Postponed (inclement weather). Rescheduled to July 4.						
45	May 28	Guardians	1–8	Bieber (2–3)	**Faedo** (1–2)	—	26,134	16–29	L1
46	May 29	Guardians	2–1	**Lange** (2–1)	McKenzie (3–4)	**Soto** (8)	19,990	17–29	W1
47	May 30	Twins	7–5	**Jiménez** (2–0)	Smith (1–1)	**Soto** (9)	15,191	18–29	W2
48	May 31	Twins	2–8	Smeltzer (2–0)	**R. García** (0–1)	—	11,756	18–30	L1
49	May 31	Twins	4–0	**Peralta** (2–0)	Sands (0–1)	—	12,122	19–30	W1

June: 10–15 (Home 5–7, Road 5–8)

#	Date	Opponent	Score	Win	Loss	Save	Attendance	Record	Streak
50	June 1	Twins	5–0	**Skubal** (4–2)	Ober (1–2)	—	13,211	20–30	W2
51	June 2	Twins	3–2	**Lange** (3–1)	Pagán (1–2)	**Soto** (10)	17,972	21–30	W3
52	June 3	@ Yankees	0–13	Cole (5–1)	**El. Rodríguez** (0–1)	—	42,026	21–31	L1
53	June 4	@ Yankees	0–3	Severino (4–1)	**Brieske** (0–5)	Holmes (8)	38,106	21–32	L2
54	June 5	@ Yankees	4–5 (10)	King (3–1)	**Soto** (2–3)	—	38,040	21–33	L3
55	June 7	@ Pirates	5–3	**Skubal** (5–2)	Quintana (1–3)	**Soto** (11)	10,214	22–33	W1
56	June 8	@ Pirates	3–1	**Vest** (1–1)	Crowe (2–3)	**Soto** (12)	11,723	23–33	W2
57	June 10	Blue Jays	1–10	Berríos (5–2)	**El. Rodríguez** (0–2)	—	26,226	23–34	L1
58	June 11	Blue Jays	3–1	**Brieske** (1–5)	Gausman (5–5)	**Soto** (13)	30,738	24–34	W1
59	June 12	Blue Jays	0–6	Stripling (3–1)	**Skubal** (5–3)	—	29,399	24–35	L1
60	June 13	White Sox	5–9	Sousa (3–0)	**R. García** (0–2)	—	16,634	24–36	L2
61	June 14	White Sox	1–5	Cease (5–3)	**Hutchison** (0–4)	—	16,450	24–37	L3
62	June 15	White Sox	0–13	Martin (1–2)	**Faedo** (1–3)	—	20,726	24–38	L4
63	June 16	Rangers	1–3	Santana (3–2)	**Soto** (2–4)	Barlow (12)	17,448	24–39	L5
64	June 17	Rangers	0–7	Gray (2–3)	**Skubal** (5–4)	—	21,996	24–40	L6
65	June 18	Rangers	14–7	**R. García** (1–2)	Hearn (4–5)	—	28,179	25–40	W1
66	June 19	Rangers	7–3	**Lange** (4–1)	Dunning (1–5)	—	25,919	26–40	W2
67	June 20	@ Red Sox	2–5	Winckowski (2–1)	**Faedo** (1–4)	Houck (5)	34,811	26–41	L1
68	June 21	@ Red Sox	4–5	Hill (3–4)	**Brieske** (1–6)	Schreiber (2)	29,168	26–42	L2
69	June 22	@ Red Sox	2–6	Wacha (6–1)	**Skubal** (5–5)	—	35,180	26–43	L3
70	June 24	@ Diamondbacks	5–1	**R. García** (2–2)	Kelly (6–5)	—	22,064	27–43	W1
71	June 25	@ Diamondbacks	6–3	**Alexander** (1–3)	Mantiply (1–1)	**Soto** (14)	23,129	28–43	W2
72	June 26	@ Diamondbacks	7–11	Wendelken (2–1)	**Vest** (1–2)	—	22,529	28–44	L1
73	June 28	@ Giants	3–4	Rodón (7–4)	**Skubal** (5–6)	Doval (12)	28,004	28–45	L2
74	June 29	@ Giants	3–2	**R. García** (3–2)	Wood (5–7)	**Soto** (15)	26,576	29–45	W1

July: 12–17 (Home 7–5, Road 5–12)

#	Date	Opponent	Score	Win	Loss	Save	Attendance	Record	Streak
75	July 1	Royals	1–3	Keller (3–9)	**Pineda** (1–3)	Barlow (11)	24,349	29–46	L1
76	July 2	Royals	4–3	**Jiménez** (3–0)	Payamps (2–2)	—	23,502	30–46	W1
77	July 3	Royals	4–7	Cuas (2–0)	**Skubal** (5–7)	Barlow (12)	21,625	30–47	L1
78	July 4	Guardians	4–1	**Hill** (1–0)	Plesac (2–6)	**Soto** (16)	19,737	31–47	W1
79	July 4	Guardians	5–3	**Alexander** (2–3)	Stephan (3–3)	**Jiménez** (1)	24,395	32–47	W2
80	July 5	Guardians	11–4	**Hutchison** (1–4)	Quantrill (4–5)	—	16,662	33–47	W3
81	July 6	Guardians	8–2	**Pineda** (2–3)	Bieber (3–5)	—	17,829	34–47	W4
82	July 7	@ White Sox	2–1	**Brieske** (2–6)	Cease (7–4)	**Soto** (17)	21,876	35–47	W5
83	July 8	@ White Sox	7–5	**Skubal** (6–7)	Giolito (5–5)	**Fulmer** (2)	29,215	36–47	W6
84	July 9	@ White Sox	0–8	Cueto (3–4)	**Hill** (1–1)	—	29,215	36–48	L1
85	July 10	@ White Sox	2–4	Graveman (3–1)	**Fulmer** (2–3)	Hendriks (17)	31,072	36–49	L2
86	July 11	@ Royals	1–3	Keller (5–9)	**Pineda** (2–4)	Barlow (14)	11,084	36–50	L3
87	July 11	@ Royals	3–7	Zerpa (1–0)	**Faedo** (1–5)	—	16,202	36–51	L4
88	July 12	@ Royals	7–5	**Brieske** (3–6)	Cuas (2–1)	**Soto** (18)	14,541	37–51	W1
89	July 13	@ Royals	2–5	Singer (4–3)	**Skubal** (6–8)	Barlow (15)	11,016	37–52	L1
90	July 14	@ Guardians	0–4	McKenzie (7–6)	**El. Rodríguez** (0–3)	—	14,327	37–53	L2
91	July 15	@ Guardians	5–6	Shaw (4–1)	**Fulmer** (2–4)	Stephan (2)	27,846	37–54	L3
92	July 16	@ Guardians	0–10	Quantrill (6–5)	**Pineda** (2–5)	—	26,789	37–55	L4
—	July 17	@ Guardians	Postponed (inclement weather). Rescheduled to August 15.						
**2022 Major League Baseball All-Star Game**
93	July 21	@ Athletics	7–2	**Skubal** (7–8)	Logue (3–5)	—	7,282	38–55	W1
94	July 21	@ Athletics	0–5	Acevedo (2–2)	**Hill** (1–2)	—	7,282	38–56	L1
95	July 23	Twins	4–8	Ryan (7–3)	**Pineda** (2–6)	—	34,205	38–57	L2
96	July 24	Twins	1–9	Gray (5–3)	**R. García** (3–3)	—	23,570	38–58	L3
97	July 25	Padres	12–4	**Vest** (2–2)	Manaea (5–5)	—	21,647	39–58	W1
98	July 26	Padres	4–6 (10)	Rogers (1–4)	**Soto** (2–5)	Martinez (4)	24,213	39–59	L1
99	July 27	Padres	4–3	**Fulmer** (3–4)	Rogers (1–5)	—	24,669	40–59	W1
100	July 28	@ Blue Jays	3–5	Kikuchi (4–5)	**Alexander** (2–4)	Romano (22)	27,080	40–60	L1
101	July 29	@ Blue Jays	4–2	**Vest** (3–2)	Manoah (11–5)	**Soto** (19)	28,046	41–60	W1
102	July 30	@ Blue Jays	3–5	Richards (3–1)	**Law** (0–1)	Romano (23)	42,933	41–61	L1
103	July 31	@ Blue Jays	1–4	Berríos (8–4)	**Hill** (1–3)	Romano (24)	40,298	41–62	L2

August: 9–18 (Home 4–10, Road 5–8)

#	Date	Opponent	Score	Win	Loss	Save	Attendance	Record	Streak
104	August 1	@ Twins	3–5 (10)	Jax (5–2)	**Lange** (4–2)	—	20,231	41–63	L3
105	August 2	@ Twins	5–3	**Foley** (1–0)	Jax (5–3)	**Soto** (20)	23,394	42–63	W1
106	August 3	@ Twins	1–4	Ryan (8–4)	**Alexander** (2–5)	López (20)	25,044	42–64	L1
107	August 4	Rays	2–6	Springs (4–3)	**Hutchison** (1–5)	—	16,595	42–65	L2
108	August 5	Rays	3–5	Beeks (2–1)	**Jiménez** (3–1)	Poche (7)	21,547	42–66	L3
109	August 6	Rays	9–1	**Hill** (2–3)	McClanahan (10–5)	—	40,101	43–66	W1
110	August 7	Rays	0–7	Poche (4–1)	**Soto** (2–6)	—	18,395	43–67	L1
111	August 9	Guardians	2–5	Bieber (7–6)	**Alexander** (2–6)	Clase (25)	16,359	43–68	L2
112	August 10	Guardians	2–3	Shaw (5–2)	**Hutchison** (1–6)	Clase (26)	16,560	43–69	L3
113	August 11	Guardians	3–4 (10)	De Los Santos (3–0)	**Soto** (2–7)	Shaw (1)	19,036	43–70	L4
114	August 12	@ White Sox	0–2	López (5–2)	**Lange** (4–3)	Hendriks (24)	33,015	43–71	L5
115	August 13	@ White Sox	4–6	Giolito (9–6)	**Jiménez** (3–2)	Hendriks (25)	29,458	43–72	L6
116	August 14	@ White Sox	3–5	Lynn (3–5)	**Alexander** (2–7)	Graveman (6)	32,154	43–73	L7
117	August 15	@ Guardians	1–4	Karinchak (1–0)	**Vest** (3–3)	Clase (27)	16,980	43–74	L8
118	August 15	@ Guardians	7–5	**B. Garcia** (1–0)	Morgan (4–3)	**Soto** (21)	16,980	44–74	W1
119	August 16	@ Guardians	4–3	**Hill** (3–3)	Plesac (2–11)	**Soto** (22)	13,503	45–74	W2
120	August 17	@ Guardians	4–8	Shaw (6–2)	**Chafin** (0–2)	—	14,335	45–75	L1
121	August 19	Angels	0–1	Sandoval (4–8)	**Manning** (0–1)	—	28,197	45–76	L2
122	August 20	Angels	4–3	**Alexander** (3–7)	Detmers (4–4)	**Soto** (23)	23,581	46–76	W1
123	August 21	Angels	4–0	**Ed. Rodríguez** (2–3)	Ohtani (10–8)	—	23,064	47–76	W2
124	August 23	Giants	1–3	Rodón (12–6)	**Hutchison** (1–7)	Doval (18)	21,123	47–77	L1
125	August 24	Giants	6–1	**Manning** (1–1)	Webb (11–7)	—	17,400	48–77	W1
126	August 26	@ Rangers	6–7	Otto (6–8)	**Alexander** (3–8)	Leclerc (2)	20,357	48–78	L1
127	August 27	@ Rangers	11–2	**Ed. Rodríguez** (3–3)	Keuchel (2–8)	—	34,357	49–78	W1
128	August 28	@ Rangers	9–8	**Hutchison** (2–7)	Arihara (2–1)	**Jiménez** (2)	24,938	50–78	W2
129	August 30	Mariners	3–9	Kirby (6–3)	**Manning** (1–2)	Flexen (1)	12,536	50–79	L1
130	August 31	Mariners	3–5	Gonzales (10–12)	**Lange** (4–4)	Sewald (17)	13,666	50–80	L2

September: 13–13 (Home 5–9, Road 8–4)

#	Date	Opponent	Score	Win	Loss	Save	Attendance	Record	Streak
131	September 1	Mariners	0–7	Gilbert (11–5)	**Ed. Rodríguez** (3–4)	—	14,393	50–81	L3
132	September 2	Royals	5–4	**Chafin** (1–2)	Hernández (0–4)	**Soto** (24)	16,067	51–81	W1
133	September 3	Royals	2–12	Heasley (3–7)	**Pineda** (2–7)	—	15,259	51–82	L1
134	September 4	Royals	2–3	Coleman (4–1)	**Soto** (2–8)	Barlow (21)	15,206	51–83	L2
135	September 5	@ Angels	0–10	Suárez (6–6)	**Alexander** (3–9)	—	19,518	51–84	L3
136	September 6	@ Angels	4–5 (10)	Tepera (4–2)	**Chafin** (1–3)	—	20,002	51–85	L4
137	September 7	@ Angels	5–4	**Cisnero** (1–0)	Quijada (0–4)	**Soto** (25)	15,756	52–85	W1
138	September 9	@ Royals	10–2	**Wentz** (1–1)	Lynch (4–10)	—	14,556	53–85	W2
139	September 10	@ Royals	8–4 (8)	**Manning** (2–2)	Heasley (3–8)	—	15,929	54–85	W3
140	September 11	@ Royals	0–4	Singer (8–4)	**Alexander** (3–10)	—	13,150	54–86	L1
141	September 12	Astros	0–7	Valdez (15–5)	**Ed. Rodríguez** (3–5)	—	13,054	54–87	L2
142	September 13	Astros	3–6	Brown (2–0)	**Hutchison** (2–8)	Pressly (27)	13,820	54–88	L3
143	September 14	Astros	1–2	Javier (9–9)	**Wentz** (1–2)	Pressly (28)	13,947	54–89	L4
144	September 16	White Sox	3–2 (10)	**Lange** (5–4)	Hendriks (3–4)	—	16,335	55–89	W1
145	September 17	White Sox	3–4 (11)	Hendriks (4–4)	**Soto** (2–9)	Bummer (2)	17,579	55–90	L1
146	September 18	White Sox	5–11	Banks (2–0)	**Hutchison** (2–9)	—	14,435	55–91	L2
147	September 19	@ Orioles	11–0	**Alexander** (4–10)	Wells (7–7)	—	10,201	56–91	W1
148	September 20	@ Orioles	3–2	**Wentz** (2–2)	Voth (5–3)	**Soto** (26)	9,582	57–91	W2
149	September 21	@ Orioles	1–8	Lyles (11–11)	**Manning** (2–3)	—	9,314	57–92	L1
150	September 23	@ White Sox	5–3	**Ed. Rodríguez** (4–5)	López (5–4)	**Soto** (27)	33,257	58–92	W1
151	September 24	@ White Sox	7–2	**Hutchison** (3–9)	Martin (2–5)	—	36,177	59–92	W2
152	September 25	@ White Sox	4–1	**Chafin** (2–3)	Graveman (3–4)	**Soto** (28)	33,549	60–92	W3
153	September 27	Royals	4–3 (10)	**Lange** (6–4)	Misiewicz (2–2)	—	13,334	61–92	W4
154	September 28	Royals	2–1	**Norris** (1–4)	Lynch (4–12)	**Soto** (29)	12,610	62–92	W5
155	September 29	Royals	10–3	**Ed. Rodríguez** (5–5)	Heasley (4–9)	—	13,137	63–92	W6
156	September 30	Twins	0–7	Ryan (13–8)	**Alexander** (4–11)	—	18,505	63–93	L1

October: 3–3 (Home 2–0, Road 1–3)

#	Date	Opponent	Score	Win	Loss	Save	Attendance	Record	Streak
157	October 1	Twins	3–2	**Norris** (2–4)	Henríquez (0–1)	**Chafin** (2)	18,307	64–93	W1
158	October 2	Twins	5–2	**Lange** (7–4)	Woods Richardson (0–1)	**Soto** (30)	20,105	65–93	W2
159	October 3	@ Mariners	4–3	**B. Garcia** (2–0)	Kirby (8–5)	**Chafin** (3)	23,463	66–93	W3
160	October 4	@ Mariners	6–7 (10)	Torrens (1–0)	**Soto** (2–10)	—	24,564	66–94	L1
161	October 4	@ Mariners	6–9	Sheffield (1–0)	**El. Rodríguez** (0–4)	Castillo (7)	24,564	66–95	L2
162	October 5	@ Mariners	4–5	Swanson (3–2)	**Soto** (2–11)	—	22,053	66–96	L3

Legend: = Win = Loss = Postponement
Bold = Tigers team member

== Roster ==
2022 Detroit Tigers
Roster
Pitchers: 70 Tyler Alexander; 50 Jacob Barnes; 63 Beau Brieske; 66 Drew Carlton; 54 Luis Castillo; 37 Andrew Chafin; 67 José Cisnero; 62 Ángel De Jesús; 38 Miguel Díaz; 49 Alex Faedo; 68 Jason Foley; 32 Michael Fulmer; 33 Bryan Garcia; 51 Rony García; 50 Garrett Hill; 40,50 Drew Hutchison; 77 Joe Jiménez; 55 Alex Lange; 48 Derek Law; 25 Matt Manning; 12 Casey Mize; 44 Daniel Norris; 58 Wily Peralta; 38 Michael Pineda; 57 Eduardo Rodríguez; 45 Elvin Rodríguez; 29 Tarik Skubal; 65 Gregory Soto; 19 Will Vest; 43 Joey Wentz	Catchers: 15 Tucker Barnhart; 64 Dustin Garneau; 13 Eric Haase; Infielders: 28 Javier Báez; 46 Jeimer Candelario; 30 Harold Castro; 21 Kody Clemens; 74 Brendon Davis; 32 Ryan Kreidler; 58 Josh Lester; 7 Jonathan Schoop; 59 Zack Short; 20 Spencer Torkelson; Outfielders: 60 Akil Baddoo; 41 Daz Cameron; 48 Kerry Carpenter; 9 Willi Castro; 31 Riley Greene; 8 Robbie Grossman; 54 Derek Hill; 17 Austin Meadows; 22 Víctor Reyes; Other batters: 24 Miguel Cabrera	Manager: 14 A. J. Hinch; Coaches: 98 Jeremy Carrell (bullpen catcher); 53 Scott Coolbaugh (hitting); 52 Chris Fetter (pitching); 27 Mike Hessman (assistant hitting coach); 44,8 Gary Jones (first base coach); 26 George Lombard (bench coach); 61 Juan Nieves (assistant pitching coach); 88 Josh Paul (quality control); 99 Tim Remes (bullpen catcher); 39 Ramón Santiago (third base)

== Player stats ==
Note: Team leaders are indicated in bold.

=== Batting ===
Note: G = Games played; AB = At bats; R = Runs scored; H = Hits; 2B = Doubles; 3B = Triples; HR = Home runs; RBI = Runs batted in; BB = Walks; K = Strikeouts; SB = Stolen bases; AVG = Batting average;

Player	G	AB	R	H	2B	3B	HR	RBI	BB	K	SB	AVG
Akil Baddoo	73	201	30	41	3	2	2	9	24	64	**9**	.204
Javier Báez	**144**	**555**	**64**	**132**	**27**	**4**	**17**	**67**	26	**147**	**9**	**.238**
Tucker Barnhart	94	281	16	62	10	0	1	16	25	74	0	.221
Miguel Cabrera	112	397	25	101	10	0	5	43	28	101	1	.254
Daz Cameron	21	64	6	14	3	1	1	8	5	20	2	.219
Kerry Carpenter	31	103	16	26	4	1	6	10	6	32	0	.252
Jeimer Candelario	124	429	49	93	19	2	13	50	28	109	0	.217
Harold Castro	120	420	37	114	21	2	7	47	17	79	0	.271
Willi Castro	112	365	47	88	18	2	8	31	15	82	9	.241
Kody Clemens	57	117	13	17	4	0	5	17	8	33	1	.145
Brendon Davis	3	10	2	2	0	0	0	0	1	3	1	.200
Dustin Garneau	8	10	1	3	1	0	0	1	1	4	0	.300
Riley Greene	93	376	46	95	18	**4**	5	42	36	120	1	.253
Robbie Grossman+	83	273	24	56	13	1	2	23	**38**	90	3	.205
Eric Haase	110	323	41	82	17	1	14	44	24	97	0	.254
Derek Hill	31	83	8	19	2	0	1	3	5	28	3	.229
Ryan Kreidler	26	73	8	13	1	0	1	6	6	22	0	.178
Josh Lester	2	5	0	0	0	0	0	0	0	3	0	.000
Austin Meadows	36	128	9	32	6	2	1	11	16	17	0	.250
Víctor Reyes	92	315	27	80	19	3	3	34	13	77	2	.254
Jonathan Schoop	131	481	48	97	23	1	11	38	19	107	5	.202
Zack Short	6	9	2	0	0	0	0	2	2	5	1	.000
Spencer Torkelson	110	360	38	73	16	1	8	28	37	99	0	.203
**Team totals**	**162**	**5378**	**557**	**1240**	**235**	**27**	**110**	**530**	**380**	**1413**	**47**	**.231**

+Totals with Tigers only.

=== Pitching ===
Note: No ERA or WHIP qualifiers (162 innings, 1 IP per scheduled game)

Note: W = Wins; L = Losses; ERA = Earned run average; WHIP = Walks plus hits per inning pitched; G = Games pitched; GS = Games started; SV = Saves; IP = Innings pitched; H = Hits allowed; R = Runs allowed; ER = Earned runs allowed; BB = Walks allowed; K = Strikeouts

Player	W	L	ERA	WHIP	G	GS	SV	IP	H	R	ER	BB	K
Tyler Alexander	4	**11**	4.81	1.32	27	17	0	101	**108**	**58**	**54**	25	61
Jacob Barnes	3	1	6.10	1.45	22	0	0	20 2/3	21	14	14	9	10
Beau Brieske	3	6	4.19	1.20	15	15	0	81 2/3	73	39	38	25	54
Drew Carlton	0	0	2.08	0.60	5	0	0	8 2/3	4	4	2	0	7
Luis Castillo	0	0	0.00	0.55	3	0	0	3 2/3	2	0	0	0	4
Andrew Chafin	2	3	2.83	1.17	64	0	3	57 1/3	48	26	18	19	67
José Cisnero	1	0	1.08	1.36	28	0	0	25	15	4	3	19	23
Miguel Díaz	0	0	2.45	0.82	3	0	0	3 2/3	1	1	1	2	3
Ángel De Jesús	0	0	2.13	1.03	8	0	0	12 2/3	9	3	3	4	7
Alex Faedo	1	5	5.53	1.64	12	12	0	53 2/3	63	34	33	25	44
Jason Foley	1	0	3.88	1.38	60	0	0	60 1/3	72	27	26	11	43
Michael Fulmer+	3	4	3.20	1.25	41	0	2	39 1/3	29	17	14	20	39
Bryan Garcia	2	0	3.54	1.18	4	4	0	20 1/3	14	8	8	10	17
Rony García	3	3	4.41	1.04	16	8	0	51	40	27	25	13	48
Garrett Hill	3	3	4.03	1.36	17	8	0	60 1/3	53	29	27	29	40
Drew Hutchison	3	9	4.53	1.48	28	18	0	105 1/3	**114**	**58**	53	**42**	68
Joe Jiménez	3	2	3.49	1.09	62	0	2	56 2/3	49	24	22	13	77
Alex Lange	7	4	3.69	1.25	**71**	0	0	63 1/3	48	30	26	31	82
Derek Law+	0	1	4.50	2.50	2	0	0	2	4	5	1	1	2
Matt Manning	2	3	3.43	1.17	12	12	0	63	55	27	24	19	48
Casey Mize	0	1	5.40	1.50	2	2	0	10	13	6	6	2	4
Daniel Norris	2	0	3.45	1.05	14	2	0	28 2/3	22	11	11	8	23
Wily Peralta	2	0	2.58	1.51	28	1	0	38 1/3	34	12	11	24	32
Michael Pineda	2	7	5.79	1.41	11	11	0	46 2/3	58	31	30	8	26
Eduardo Rodríguez	5	5	4.05	1.33	17	17	0	91	87	49	41	34	72
Elvin Rodríguez	0	4	10.62	1.92	7	5	0	29 2/3	42	35	35	15	25
Tarik Skubal	**7**	8	3.52	1.16	21	**21**	0	**117 2/3**	104	53	46	32	**117**
Gregory Soto	2	**11**	3.28	1.38	64	0	**30**	60 1/3	49	32	22	34	60
Will Vest	3	3	4.00	1.33	59	2	1	63	62	30	28	22	63
Joey Wentz	2	2	3.03	1.10	7	7	0	32 2/3	23	13	11	13	27
**Team totals**	**66**	**96**	**4.04**	**1.30**	**162**	**162**	**38**	**1419 2/3**	**1336**	**713**	**637**	**511**	**1195**

+Totals with Tigers only.

== Farm system ==
Level	Team	League	Manager
AAA	Toledo Mud Hens	International League	Lloyd McClendon
AA	Erie SeaWolves	Eastern League	Gabe Álvarez
High-A	West Michigan Whitecaps	Midwest League	Brayan Peña
Single-A	Lakeland Flying Tigers	Florida State League	Andrew Graham
Rookie	GCL Tigers East	Gulf Coast League	
Rookie	GCL Tigers West	Gulf Coast League	
Rookie	DSL Tigers 1	Dominican Summer League	Juan Vazquez
Rookie	DSL Tigers 2	Dominican Summer League	Ramon Zapata
