= Jacob Barnes =

American baseball player (born 1990)

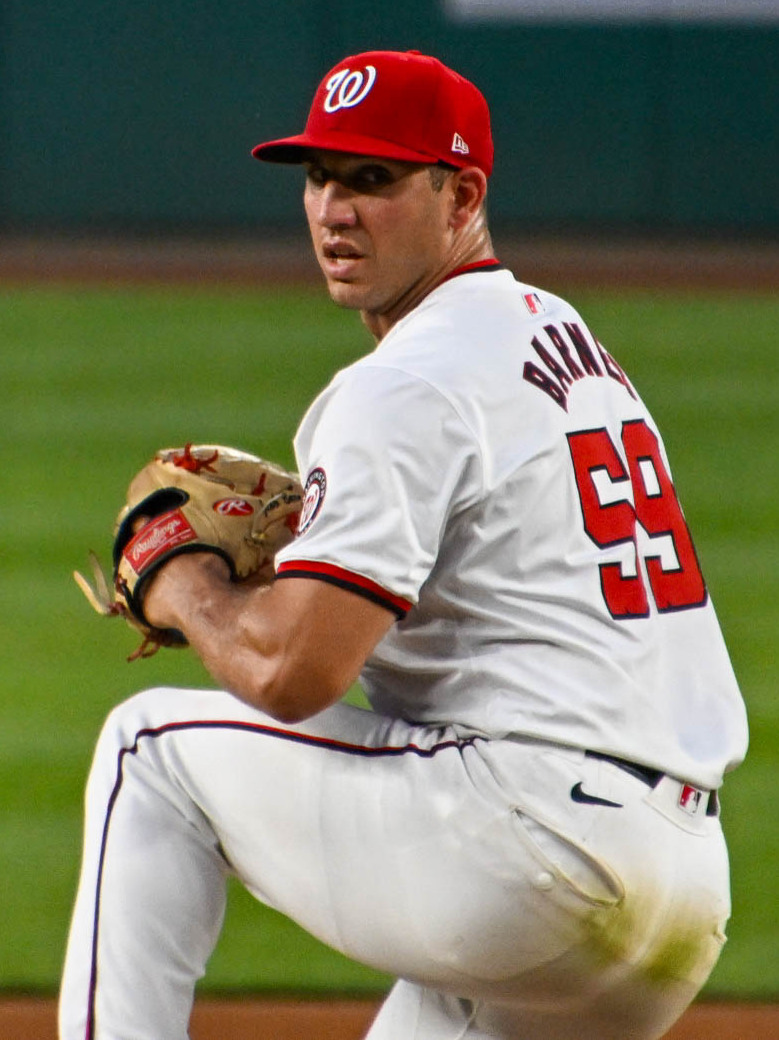
- Barnes with the Washington Nationals in 2024

Algodoneros de Unión Laguna – No. 67
- Pitcher
- Born: April 14, 1990 (age 36); St. Petersburg, Florida, U.S.
- Bats: Right Throws: Right

MLB debut
- June 3, 2016, for the Milwaukee Brewers

MLB statistics (through 2025 season)
- Win–loss record: 16–21
- Earned run average: 4.79
- Strikeouts: 322
- Stats at Baseball Reference

Teams
- Milwaukee Brewers (2016–2019); Kansas City Royals (2019); Los Angeles Angels (2020); New York Mets (2021); Toronto Blue Jays (2021); Detroit Tigers (2022); New York Yankees (2022); St. Louis Cardinals (2023); Washington Nationals (2024); Toronto Blue Jays (2025)

Jacob Andrew Barnes (born April 14, 1990) is an American professional baseball pitcher for the Algodoneros de Unión Laguna of the Mexican League. He has previously played in Major League Baseball (MLB) for the Milwaukee Brewers, Kansas City Royals, Los Angeles Angels, New York Mets, Toronto Blue Jays Detroit Tigers, New York Yankees, St. Louis Cardinals, and Washington Nationals. He made his MLB debut in 2016.

== Career ==
=== Amateur career ===
Barnes graduated from St. Petersburg High School. He enrolled at Florida Gulf Coast University and played college baseball for the Florida Gulf Coast Eagles. In 2011, his junior year, he had a 1–4 win–loss record with a 4.58 earned run average (ERA) in 55 innings pitched. He was drafted by the Milwaukee Brewers in the 14th round of the 2011 Major League Baseball draft and he signed.

=== Milwaukee Brewers ===
After signing, Barnes made his professional debut with the Helena Brewers where he was 2–1 with a 2.12 ERA in 29 2/3 relief innings pitched. In 2012, he played for the Wisconsin Timber Rattlers where he pitched to a 4–7 record and a 3.84 ERA in 25 games (seven starts), and in 2013, he pitched with the Brevard County Manatees where he was 9–6 with a 3.08 ERA in 21 games (14 starts). Barnes began 2014 with Brevard County, and after compiling a 1.23 ERA in 7 1/3 innings, he was promoted to the Huntsville Stars and he finished the season there with a 2–6 record and 4.26 ERA in 23 games (21 being starts). In 2015, he pitched for the Biloxi Shuckers where he compiled a 4–5 record and a 3.36 ERA in 39 games including six starts.

The Brewers added Barnes to their 40-man roster after the 2015 season. He began 2016 with the Colorado Springs Sky Sox.

After posting a 1.21 ERA over 17 games for the Sky Sox, the Brewers promoted Barnes to the major leagues on June 2, 2016. He made his major league debut the next day, and spent the remainder of the season with Milwaukee. In 26 2/3 innings pitched in relief, he was 0–1 with a 2.70 ERA. In 2017, Barnes returned to Milwaukee and posted a 3–4 record and a 4.00 ERA in 73 relief appearances in his first full major league season.

Barnes returned to Milwaukee's bullpen to begin 2018. However, after pitching to a 12.00 ERA in his first four outings in May, he was optioned to Colorado Springs on May 12. He was recalled on May 27.

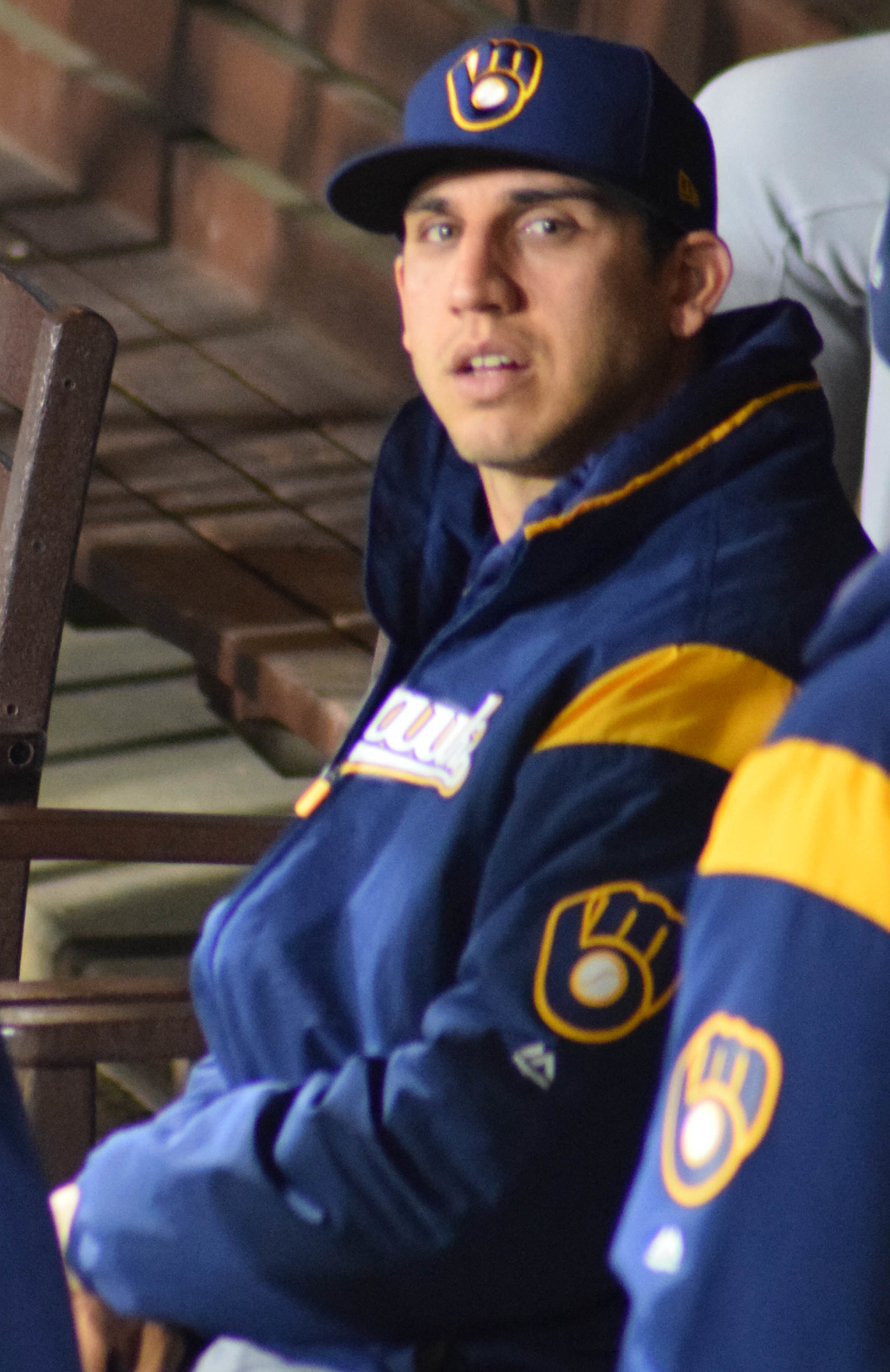
Barnes with the Brewers in 2019

On August 1, 2019, Barnes was designated for assignment after posting an ERA of 6.86 in 19 2/3 innings.

=== Kansas City Royals ===
On August 3, 2019, Barnes was claimed off waivers by the Kansas City Royals. Barnes was designated for assignment on November 4 and was released on November 6.

=== Los Angeles Angels ===
On January 22, 2020, Barnes signed a minor league deal with the Los Angeles Angels. On July 23, 2020, Barnes had his contract selected to the 40-man and active rosters. He pitched to a 5.50 ERA over 18 games for the Angels in 2020.

=== New York Mets ===
On October 30, 2020, Barnes was claimed off waivers by the New York Mets. In 19 appearances for the Mets, Barnes struggled to a 6.27 ERA in 18 2/3 innings of work before being designated for assignment on June 14, 2021.

=== Toronto Blue Jays ===
On June 19, 2021, Barnes was traded to the Toronto Blue Jays in exchange for Troy Miller. Barnes was designated for assignment by Toronto on July 26 after posting a 6.00 ERA in 9 appearances with the team. On August 2, Barnes was outrighted to the Triple-A Buffalo Bisons. On September 29, Barnes was re-selected to the 40-man roster. Barnes was again designated for assignment on October 20, and elected free agency two days later.

=== Detroit Tigers ===
On December 1, 2021, the Detroit Tigers signed Barnes to a minor league contract with an invitation to spring training. After initially being sent to minor league camp during spring training, Barnes was called back to the major league camp and made the opening day roster. On June 13, 2022, the Tigers designated Barnes for assignment. He was released by the Tigers on June 18, 2022.

=== Seattle Mariners ===
On June 22, 2022, the Seattle Mariners signed Barnes to a minor league contract. He was promoted to the major league roster on July 9. He was designated for assignment on July 11 without appearing in a game for Seattle. He cleared waivers and elected free agency on July 18.

=== Detroit Tigers (second stint) ===
On July 26, 2022, the Detroit Tigers signed Barnes to a minor league contract. He was then assigned to the Toledo Mud Hens. He was given his release on August 26.

=== New York Yankees ===
On August 31, 2022, the New York Yankees signed Barnes to a minor league contract. He pitched for the Scranton/Wilkes-Barre RailRiders. The Yankees promoted Barnes to the major leagues on October 1. He was designated for assignment the next day and outrighted back the RailRiders on October 4. On October 24, Barnes elected free agency.

=== Texas Rangers ===
On January 18, 2023, Barnes signed a minor league contract with the Texas Rangers organization. He made 13 appearances for the Triple-A Round Rock Express, working to a 2.21 ERA with 17 strikeouts and 1 save in 20 1/3 innings of work. Barnes was released by the Rangers on May 21.

=== Philadelphia Phillies ===
On May 30, 2023, Barnes signed a minor league contract with the Philadelphia Phillies organization. In 11 games for the Triple–A Lehigh Valley IronPigs, he posted a 4.15 ERA with 12 strikeouts and 1 save in 13 innings of work. On July 10, Barnes was released by Philadelphia.

=== St. Louis Cardinals ===
On July 19, 2023, Barnes signed a minor league contract with the St. Louis Cardinals organization. In 11 games for the Triple–A Memphis Redbirds, he posted a 1.53 ERA with 16 strikeouts in 17 2/3 innings pitched. On August 22, the Cardinals selected Barnes' contract, adding him to the major league roster.

In 13 games for St. Louis, he recorded a 5.93 ERA with 18 hits and 8 strikeouts in 13 2/3 innings pitched. Following the season on October 30, Barnes was removed from the 40–man roster and sent outright to Triple–A Memphis. However, Barnes subsequently rejected the assignment and elected free agency.

=== Washington Nationals ===
On February 16, 2024, Barnes signed a minor league contract with the Washington Nationals. After seven scoreless appearances for the Triple–A Rochester Red Wings, Barnes was added to Washington's major league roster on April 23. In 63 appearances for Washington, Barnes compiled an 8–3 record and 4.36 ERA with 55 strikeouts across 66 innings pitched.

=== Toronto Blue Jays (second stint) ===
On February 17, 2025, Barnes signed a minor league contract with the Toronto Blue Jays. On March 27, the Blue Jays selected Barnes' contract after he made the team's Opening Day roster. In six appearances for Toronto, he struggled to an 0–1 record and 9.00 ERA with five strikeouts over eight innings of work. Barnes was designated for assignment following the promotion of Paxton Schultz on April 20. He elected free agency after clearing waivers on April 22. On April 26, Barnes re-signed with the Blue Jays on a minor league contract. In 22 appearances for the Triple-A Buffalo Bisons, he pitched to a 2–1 record and 6.84 ERA with 20 strikeouts and one save over 25 innings of work. Barnes was released by the Blue Jays organization on August 1.

=== Algodoneros de Unión Laguna ===
On May 1, 2026, Barnes signed with the Algodoneros de Unión Laguna of the Mexican League.

== Personal life ==
Barnes is married to his wife, Sophia, and the couple has two children: Lily and Maisy. Maisy was born on May 13, 2016. Lily Isabella was born on July 29, 2022.
