= Brendon Davis =

American baseball player (born 1997)

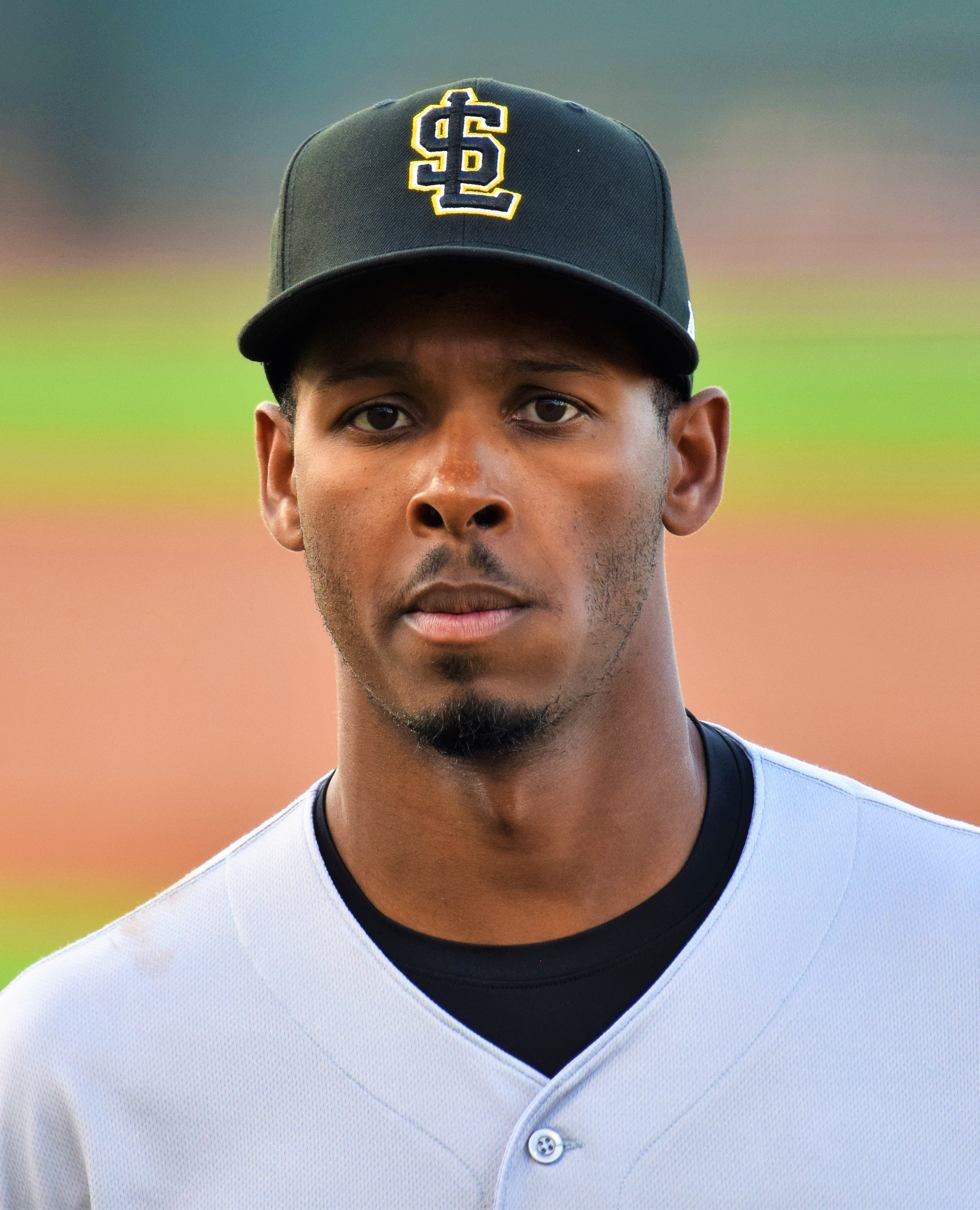
- Davis with the Salt Lake Bees
- Infielder / Outfielder
- Born: July 28, 1997 (age 28); Lakewood, California, U.S.
- Batted: Right Threw: Right

MLB debut
- October 1, 2022, for the Detroit Tigers

Last MLB appearance
- October 5, 2022, for the Detroit Tigers

MLB statistics
- Batting average: .200
- Home runs: 0
- Runs batted in: 0
- Stats at Baseball Reference

Teams
- Detroit Tigers (2022)

Brendon Davis (born July 28, 1997) is an American former professional baseball infielder and outfielder. He played in Major League Baseball (MLB) for the Detroit Tigers.

== Amateur career ==
Davis attended Lakewood High School in Lakewood, California. He committed to Cal State Fullerton to play college baseball. Davis did not play in his senior season after breaking his arm in an off-season accident. Davis was drafted by the Los Angeles Dodgers in the 5th round of the 2015 MLB draft. Davis signed with Los Angeles for a $918,600 signing bonus, which was $605,000 over slot value.

== Professional career ==
=== Los Angeles Dodgers ===
Davis split his professional debut of 2015 between the rookie-level Arizona League Dodgers and rookie-level Ogden Raptors, hitting a combined .254 in 30 games. Davis spent the 2016 season with the Great Lakes Loons, hitting .241 with five home runs and 49 RBI. He then opened the 2017 season with Great Lakes and was promoted to the Rancho Cucamonga Quakes. In 86 games for the Loons, he hit .245 while he had six hits in 30 at-bats for the Quakes.

=== Texas Rangers ===
On July 31, 2017, the Dodgers traded Davis, A. J. Alexy, and Willie Calhoun to the Texas Rangers in exchange for Yu Darvish. He finished the 2017 season with the Hickory Crawdads, hitting .182 in 25 games. Davis spent the 2018 season with the Down East Wood Ducks, hitting .254 with six home runs and 40 RBI and spent the 2019 season with the Frisco RoughRiders, hitting just .202 with three home runs and 35 RBI. Davis did not play in 2020 due to the cancellation of the Minor League Baseball season due to the COVID-19 pandemic.

=== Los Angeles Angels ===
On December 10, 2020, Davis was selected by the Los Angeles Angels in the minor league phase of the Rule 5 draft and split the 2021 season between the Tri-City Dust Devils, the Rocket City Trash Pandas, and the Salt Lake Bees, combining to hit .290 with 30 home runs, 83 RBI, and 16 stolen bases. On November 5, 2021, he was selected to the Angels 40-man roster and opened the 2022 season back with Salt Lake, hitting .243 with six home runs and 25 RBI over 36 games.

=== Detroit Tigers ===
On May 20, 2022, Davis was claimed off waivers by the Detroit Tigers and played in 103 games for the Triple–A Toledo Mud Hens down the stretch, hitting .232 with 14 home runs and 47 RBI. On September 30, he was promoted to the major leagues for the first time after Willi Castro was placed on the injured list. The following day, Davis made his major-league debut against the Minnesota Twins, striking out twice in three a-bats. On October 4, he collected his first career hit, a single off of Seattle Mariners starter Justus Sheffield. In three games with Detroit, Davis went 2–for–10 with a walk and a stolen base. On November 15, he was designated for assignment by Detroit three-days later he was non–tendered and became a free agent.

On November 29, 2022, Davis re–signed with the Tigers on a minor league contract and began the 2023 season with Triple–A Toledo, where he played in 43 games and hit .178 with five home runs and 14 RBI. The Tigers released him on June 23, 2023.

=== Los Angeles Dodgers (second stint) ===
On January 4, 2024, Davis signed a minor league contract with the Dodgers and he played in 115 games for the Double-A Tulsa Drillers and eight for the Triple–A Oklahoma City Baseball Club, batting a combined .229 with 10 home runs and 49 RBI. He became a free agent after the season.

== Post-playing career ==
In March 2025, Davis joined the Los Angeles Dodgers organization as an associate in the Player Acquisitions and Development department.

== See also ==
- Rule 5 draft results
