= Elvin Rodríguez =

Dominican baseball player (born 1998)

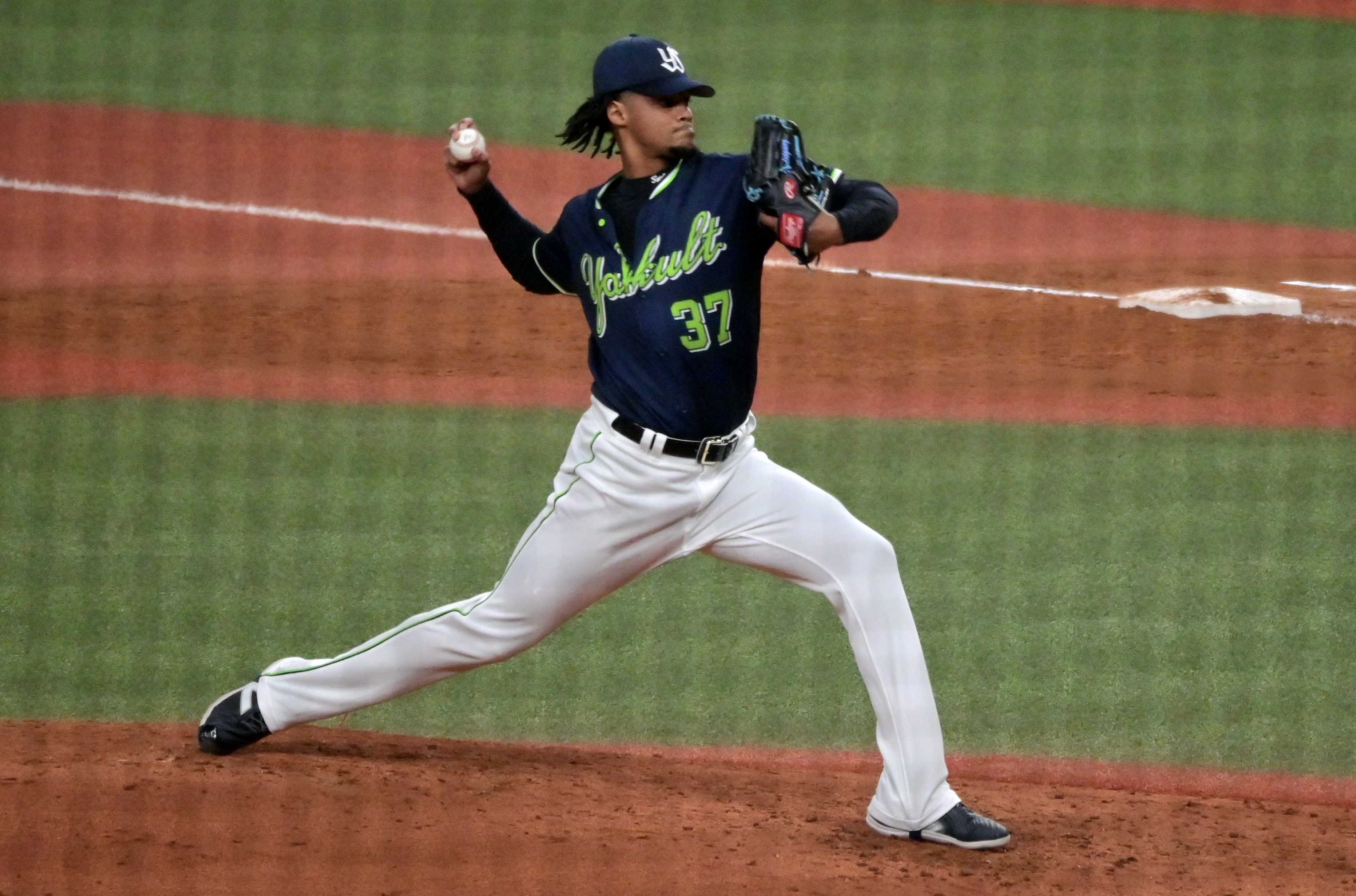
- Rodríguez with the Tokyo Yakult Swallows in 2024

Lotte Giants – No. 31
- Pitcher
- Born: March 31, 1998 (age 28); San Cristóbal, Dominican Republic
- Bats: Right Throws: Right

Professional debut
- MLB: April 10, 2022, for the Detroit Tigers
- NPB: August 9, 2023, for the Tokyo Yakult Swallows
- KBO: March 28, 2026, for the Lotte Giants

MLB statistics (through 2025 season)
- Win–loss record: 0–6
- Earned run average: 9.40
- Strikeouts: 48

NPB statistics (through 2024 season)
- Win–loss record: 2–6
- Earned run average: 2.77
- Strikeouts: 67

KBO statistics (through August 19, 2026)
- Win–loss record: 7-8
- Earned run average: 3.77
- Strikeouts: 140
- Stats at Baseball Reference

Teams
- Detroit Tigers (2022); Tampa Bay Rays (2023); Tokyo Yakult Swallows (2023–2024); Milwaukee Brewers (2025); Baltimore Orioles (2025); Lotte Giants (2026–present)

Elvin Miguel Rodríguez (born March 31, 1998) is a Dominican professional baseball pitcher for the Lotte Giants of the KBO League. He has previously played in Major League Baseball (MLB) for the Detroit Tigers, Tampa Bay Rays, Milwaukee Brewers, and Baltimore Orioles, and in Nippon Professional Baseball (NPB) for the Tokyo Yakult Swallows.

== Career ==
=== Los Angeles Angels ===
Rodríguez signed with the Los Angeles Angels as an international free agent on July 4, 2014. He spent his professional debut season of 2015 with the Dominican Summer League Angels, going 0–6 with a 4.59 over 51 innings. He split the 2016 season between the DSL and the Arizona League Angels, going a combined 4–2 with a 1.53 ERA over 58 2/3 innings. He split the 2017 season between the Orem Owlz and the Burlington Bees, going a combined 5–3 with a 2.91 ERA over 68 innings. He was named the Pioneer League Pitcher of the Year.

=== Detroit Tigers ===
On September 15, 2017, the Angels sent Rodríguez to the Detroit Tigers as the player to be named later in the trade that sent Justin Upton to the Angels. Rodríguez spent the 2018 season with the West Michigan Whitecaps, going 8–7 with a 3.34 ERA over 113 1/3 innings. He spent the 2019 season with the Lakeland Flying Tigers, going 11–9 with a 3.77 ERA over 133 2/3 innings. He did not play in 2020 due to the cancellation of the Minor League Baseball season because of the COVID-19 pandemic. On November 8, 2021, the Tigers purchased Rodríguez's contract, adding him to their 40-man roster.

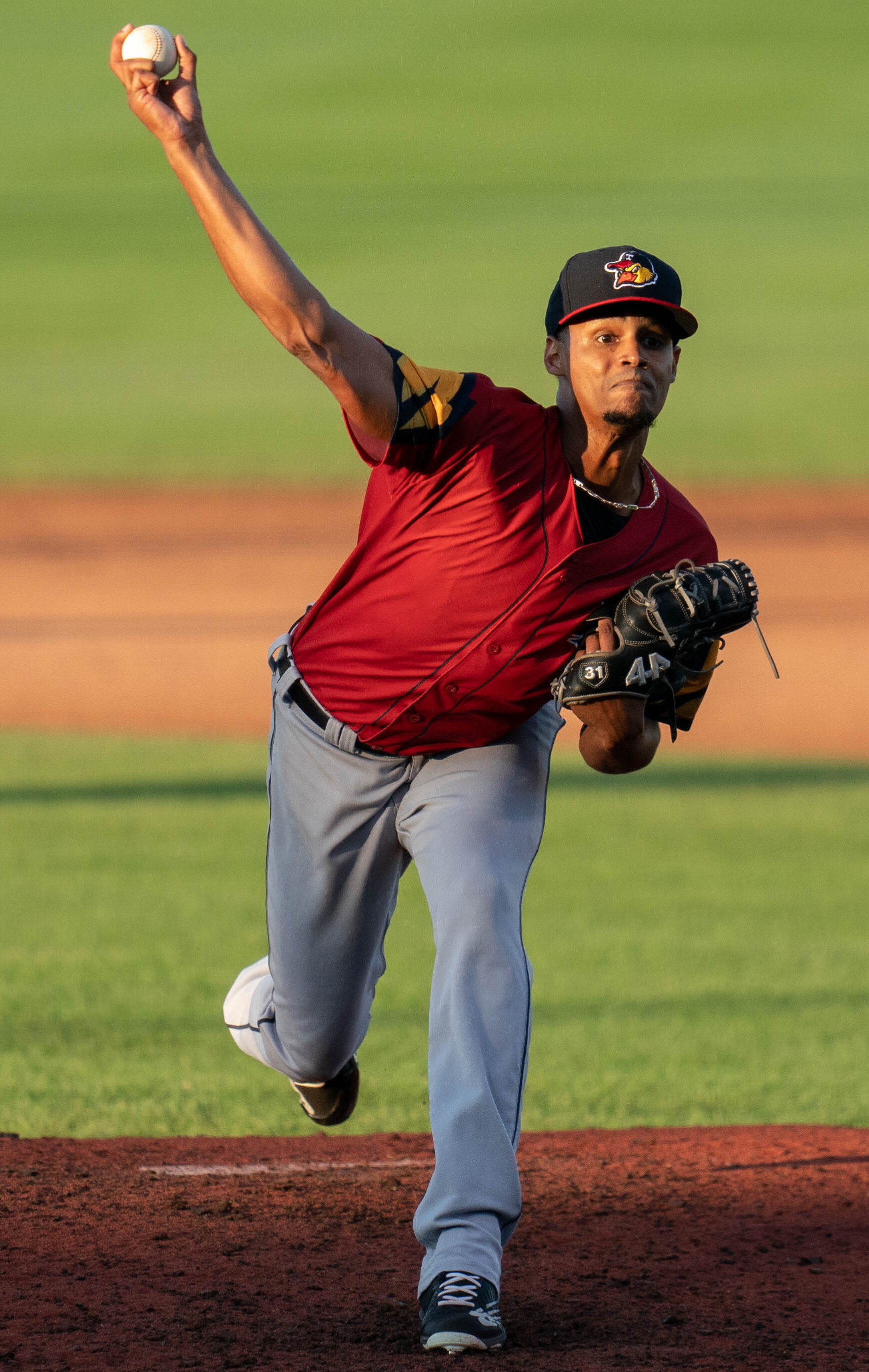
Rodríguez in 2022

Rodríguez made the Tigers' Opening Day roster for the 2022 season. He made his MLB debut on April 10, 2022, pitching in relief against the Chicago White Sox. On the season, he made seven appearances for the Tigers (five of them starts), and scuffled to an 0–4 record and 10.62 ERA with 25 strikeouts in 29.2 innings pitched. On November 10, Rodríguez was removed from the 40-man roster and sent outright to the Triple–A Toledo Mud Hens. He elected free agency the same day.

=== Tampa Bay Rays ===
On January 18, 2023, Rodríguez signed a minor league contract with the Tampa Bay Rays organization. In 10 starts for the Triple–A Durham Bulls, he registered a 3.40 ERA with 48 strikeouts in 45.0 innings of work. On July 7, the Rays selected Rodríguez's contract, adding him to the active roster. He tossed 3 1/3 perfect innings against the Atlanta Braves that night in his season debut. The following day, Rodríguez was designated for assignment after it was revealed he had agreed to a deal with a Japanese team earlier in the week. On July 9, Rodríguez was released by the Rays.

=== Tokyo Yakult Swallows ===
On July 13, 2023, Rodríguez signed with the Tokyo Yakult Swallows of Nippon Professional Baseball (NPB). In 7 games for Tokyo, he posted a 1–5 record and 4.09 ERA with 23 strikeouts across 33 innings of work.

On November 28, 2023, Rodríguez re-signed with the Swallows on a one-year contract worth $750,000 for the 2024 season. He made 32 appearances for the Swallows in 2024, compiling a 1–1 record and 1.80 ERA with 44 strikeouts across 45 innings pitched. On November 21, 2024, Rodríguez and the Swallows parted ways, making him a free agent.

=== Milwaukee Brewers ===
On January 17, 2025, Rodríguez signed a one-year contract with the Milwaukee Brewers that included a club option for the 2026 season. In six appearances (two starts) for Milwaukee, he struggled to an 0–2 record and 8.68 ERA with 17 strikeouts across 18 2/3 innings pitched. Rodríguez was designated for assignment by the Brewers on July 9.

=== Baltimore Orioles ===
On July 16, 2025, Rodríguez was claimed off waivers by the Baltimore Orioles. In his only appearance for Baltimore on August 4, he allowed two runs on three hits with one strikeout across one inning pitched against the Philadelphia Phillies. Rodríguez was designated for assignment by the Orioles on September 2.

=== Arizona Diamondbacks ===
On September 5, 2025, Rodriguez was claimed off waivers by the Arizona Diamondbacks. He made four appearances for the Triple-A Reno Aces, but struggled to a 12.60 ERA with six strikeouts over five innings of work. Rodríguez did not appear in any major league games for Arizona and the team declined his club option for 2026, making him a free agent.

=== Lotte Giants ===
On December 11, 2025, Rodríguez signed a one-year, $1 million contract with the Lotte Giants of the KBO League.

== See also ==
- List of Major League Baseball players from the Dominican Republic
