= Rony García =

Dominican baseball player (born 1997)

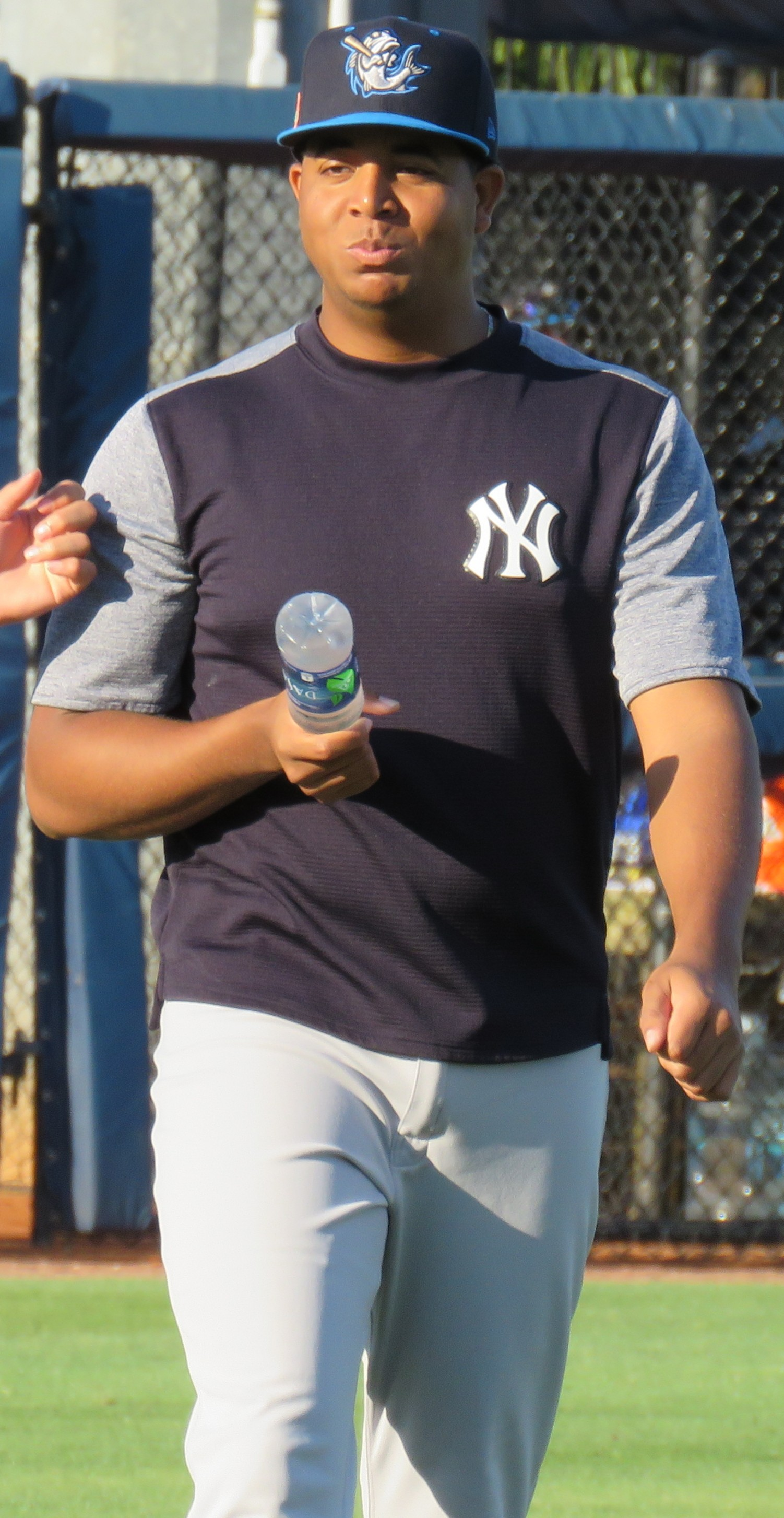
- García with the Tampa Tarpons in 2019
- Pitcher
- Born: December 19, 1997 (age 27); Mao, Dominican Republic
- Batted: Right Threw: Right

MLB debut
- July 28, 2020, for the Detroit Tigers

Last MLB appearance
- July 24, 2022, for the Detroit Tigers

MLB statistics
- Win–loss record: 4–3
- Earned run average: 5.35
- Strikeouts: 64
- Stats at Baseball Reference

Teams
- Detroit Tigers (2020–2022)

Rony Javier García (born December 19, 1997) is a Dominican former professional baseball pitcher. He made his Major League Baseball (MLB) debut in 2020 for the Detroit Tigers.

== Career ==
=== New York Yankees ===
García signed with the New York Yankees as an international free agent on July 2, 2015. He split the 2016 season between the DSL Yankees and the GCL Yankees, pitching to a 3–5 win–loss record with a 2.28 earned run average (ERA) over 71 innings pitched. He split the 2017 season between the Pulaski Yankees and the Charleston RiverDogs, going a combined 2–3 with a 2.50 ERA over 75 2/3 innings. He split the 2018 season between Charleston and the Tampa Tarpons, going a combined 4–9 with a 4.31 ERA over 119 innings. He split the 2019 season between Tampa and the Trenton Thunder, going a combined 4–13 with a 4.01 ERA over 130 1/3 innings.

=== Detroit Tigers ===
On December 12, 2019, the Detroit Tigers selected García with the first selection in the 2019 Rule 5 draft. García made his major league debut on July 28, 2020, and gave up three runs over three innings. With the 2020 Detroit Tigers, García appeared in 15 games, compiling a 1–0 record with 8.14 ERA and 14 strikeouts in 21 innings pitched.

García missed spring training in 2021 due to an appendectomy, and started the season with the Toledo Mud Hens. The Tigers promoted him to the major leagues on May 30, but made just two appearances for the team on the year. On June 15, García was placed on the 60-day injured list with a left knee sprain. In 2022, García made 16 appearances (8 starts) for the Tigers, working to a 3–3 record and 4.41 ERA with 48 strikeouts in 51.0 innings pitched.

The Tigers optioned García to Triple-A Toledo to begin the 2023 season. On March 29, 2023, he was removed from the 40-man roster and sent outright to Toledo. García spent the campaign with Toledo, making 27 appearances and struggling to an 8.29 ERA with 50 strikeouts across 38 innings pitched. He elected free agency following the season on November 6.

== See also ==
- Rule 5 draft results
