= Ángel De Jesús =

Dominican baseball player (born 1997)

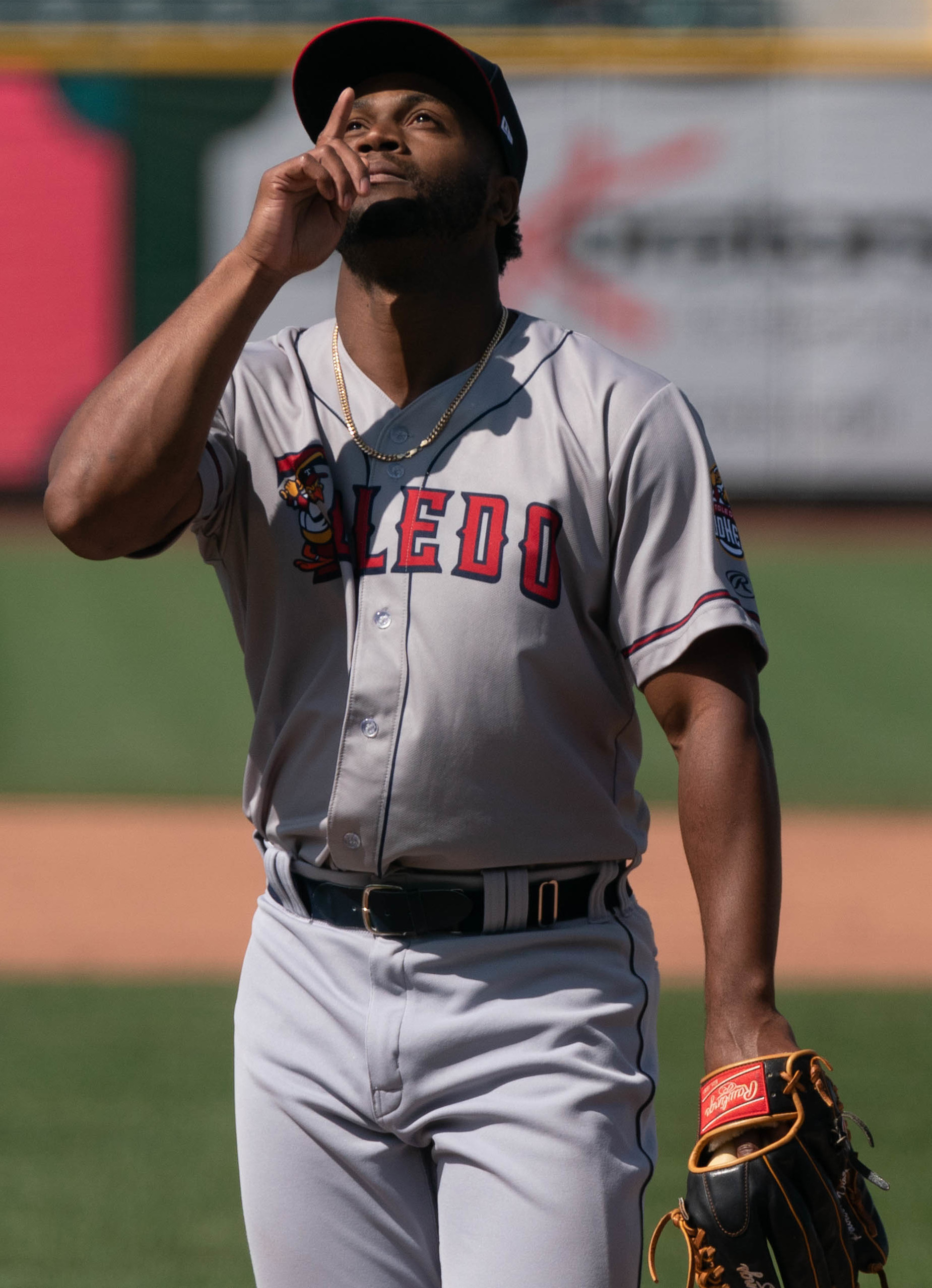
- De Jesús with the Toledo Mud Hens in 2022

Free agent
- Pitcher
- Born: February 13, 1997 (age 29); Samaná, Dominican Republic
- Bats: Right Throws: Right

MLB debut
- April 23, 2022, for the Detroit Tigers

MLB statistics (through 2022 season)
- Win–loss record: 0–0
- Earned run average: 2.13
- Strikeouts: 7
- Stats at Baseball Reference

Teams
- Detroit Tigers (2022)

Ángel De Jesús (born February 13, 1997) is a Dominican professional baseball pitcher who is a free agent. He has previously played in Major League Baseball (MLB) for the Detroit Tigers.

== Career ==
=== Detroit Tigers ===
De Jesús signed with the Detroit Tigers as an international free agent on May 10, 2016. He made his professional debut with the Dominican Summer League Tigers. He returned to the DSL Tigers in 2017, posting a 2.20 ERA in 14 appearances (8 of them starts). De Jesús split the 2018 season between the DSL Tigers and the rookie-level Gulf Coast League Tigers, accumulating a 5–3 record and 2.83 ERA with 68 strikeouts across 14 games (12 starts). In 2019, De Jesús split the season between the Single-A West Michigan Whitecaps and the High-A Lakeland Flying Tigers, pitching to a cumulative 1.61 ERA with 85 strikeouts in 61 1/3 innings pitched across 36 appearances.

De Jesús did not play in a game in 2020 due to the cancellation of the minor league season because of the COVID-19 pandemic. He spent the 2021 campaign split between the Double-A Erie SeaWolves and the Triple-A Toledo Mud Hens, working to a 3.34 ERA with 80 strikeouts in 40 appearances between the two affiliates. The Tigers added De Jesus to their 40-man roster after on November 19, 2021, in order to protect him from the Rule 5 draft.

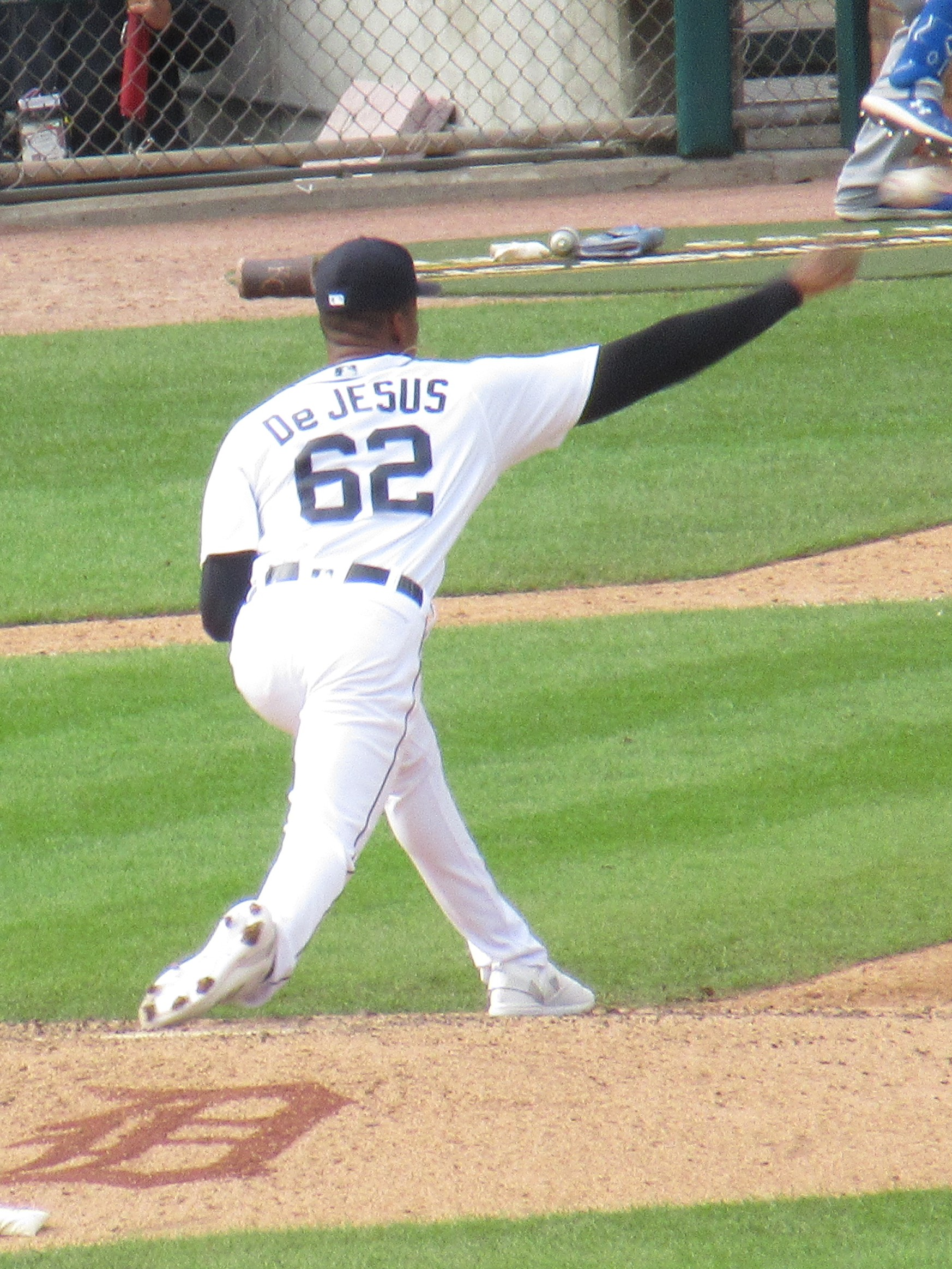
De Jesús pitching for the Detroit Tigers on September 29, 2022

On April 20, 2022, De Jesús was promoted to the major leagues for the first time after Matt Manning was placed on the injured list. De Jesús made his major league debut three days later and pitched two scoreless innings against the Colorado Rockies in the first game of a doubleheader. He was sent back down to Toledo prior to the second game of the doubleheader. De Jesús was recalled by the Tigers on July 15. He was designated for assignment on December 23, 2022. On January 6, 2023, De Jesús was sent outright to Triple-A Toledo.

De Jesús was assigned to Double–A Erie to begin the 2023 season. In 32 appearances, he recorded a 4.21 ERA with 45 strikeouts and two saves in 36 1/3 innings pitched. On August 12, 2023, it was announced that De Jesús had undergone Tommy John surgery, and would miss the remainder of the season and likely the entire 2024 season as well. He elected free agency following the season on November 6.

=== Rieleros de Aguascalientes ===
On May 13, 2024, De Jesús signed with the Rieleros de Aguascalientes of the Mexican League. However, he did not appear for the Rieleros during the year.

De Jesús made seven appearances for Aguascalientes in 2025, but struggled to an 0–2 record and 17.47 ERA with one strikeout across 5 2/3 innings pitched.

On December 1, 2025, De Jesús signed with the Kansas City Monarchs of the American Association of Professional Baseball. However, he did not make an official appearance for the club.

=== Guerreros de Oaxaca ===
On June 29, 2026, De Jesús signed with the Guerreros de Oaxaca of the Mexican League. In two relief appearances for the team, he allowed three earned runs in one inning of work. On July 4, De Jesús was released by Oaxaca.

== See also ==
- List of Major League Baseball players from the Dominican Republic
