= Willi Castro =

Puerto Rican baseball player (born 1997)

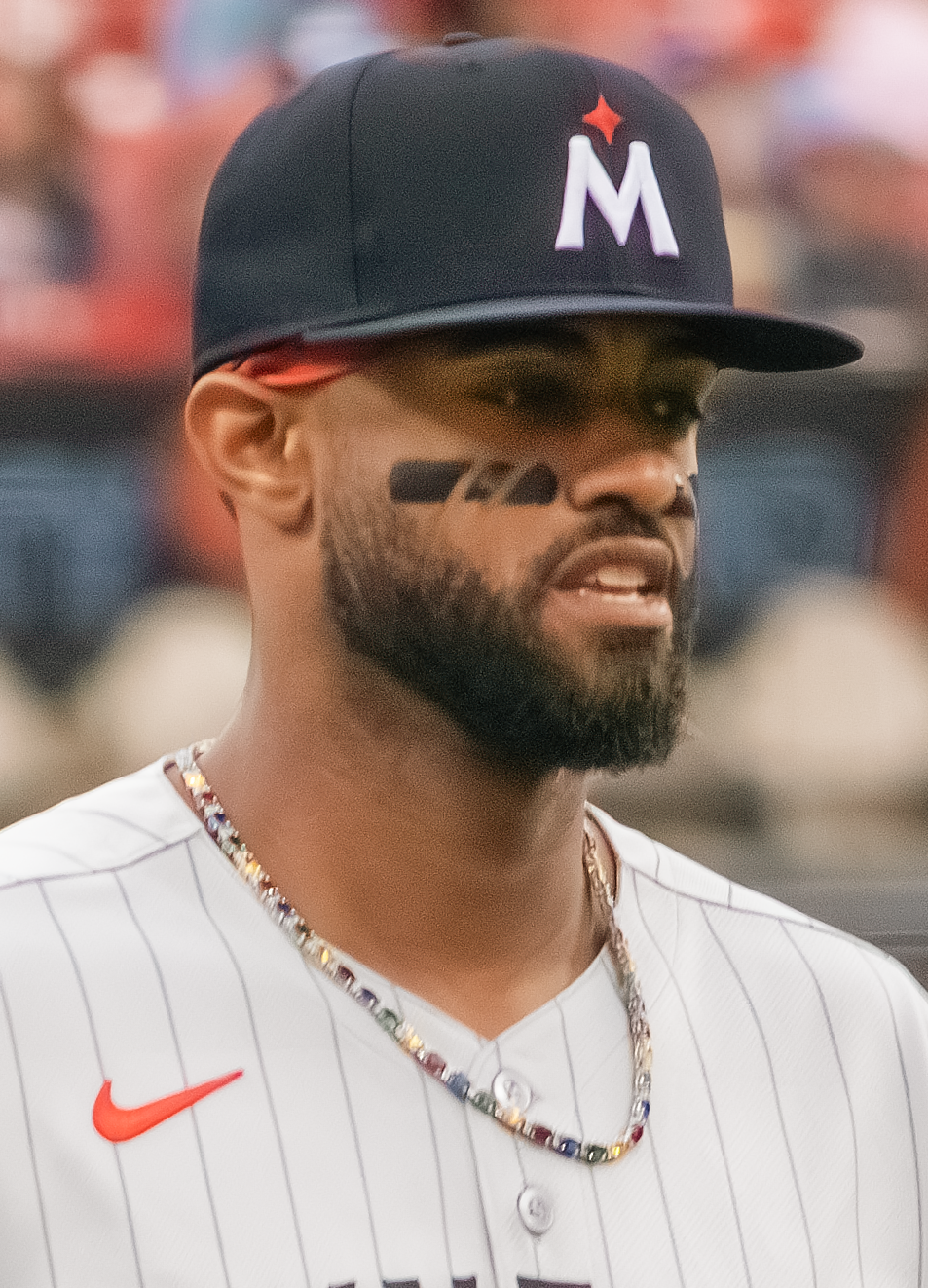
- Castro with the Minnesota Twins in 2025.

Colorado Rockies – No. 3
- Utility player
- Born: April 24, 1997 (age 29); Río Piedras, Puerto Rico
- Bats: Switch Throws: Right

MLB debut
- August 24, 2019, for the Detroit Tigers

MLB statistics (through 2026 season)
- Batting average: .247
- Home runs: 71
- Runs batted in: 284
- Stats at Baseball Reference

Teams
- Detroit Tigers (2019–2022); Minnesota Twins (2023–2025); Chicago Cubs (2025); Colorado Rockies (2026–present)

Career highlights and awards
- All-Star (2024)

Willi Rafael Castro Capellan (born April 24, 1997) is a Puerto Rican professional baseball utility player for the Colorado Rockies of Major League Baseball (MLB). He has previously played in MLB for the Detroit Tigers, Minnesota Twins, and Chicago Cubs. Castro made his MLB debut in 2019 with the Tigers and was named an All-Star in 2024 with the Twins.

== Career ==
=== Cleveland Indians ===
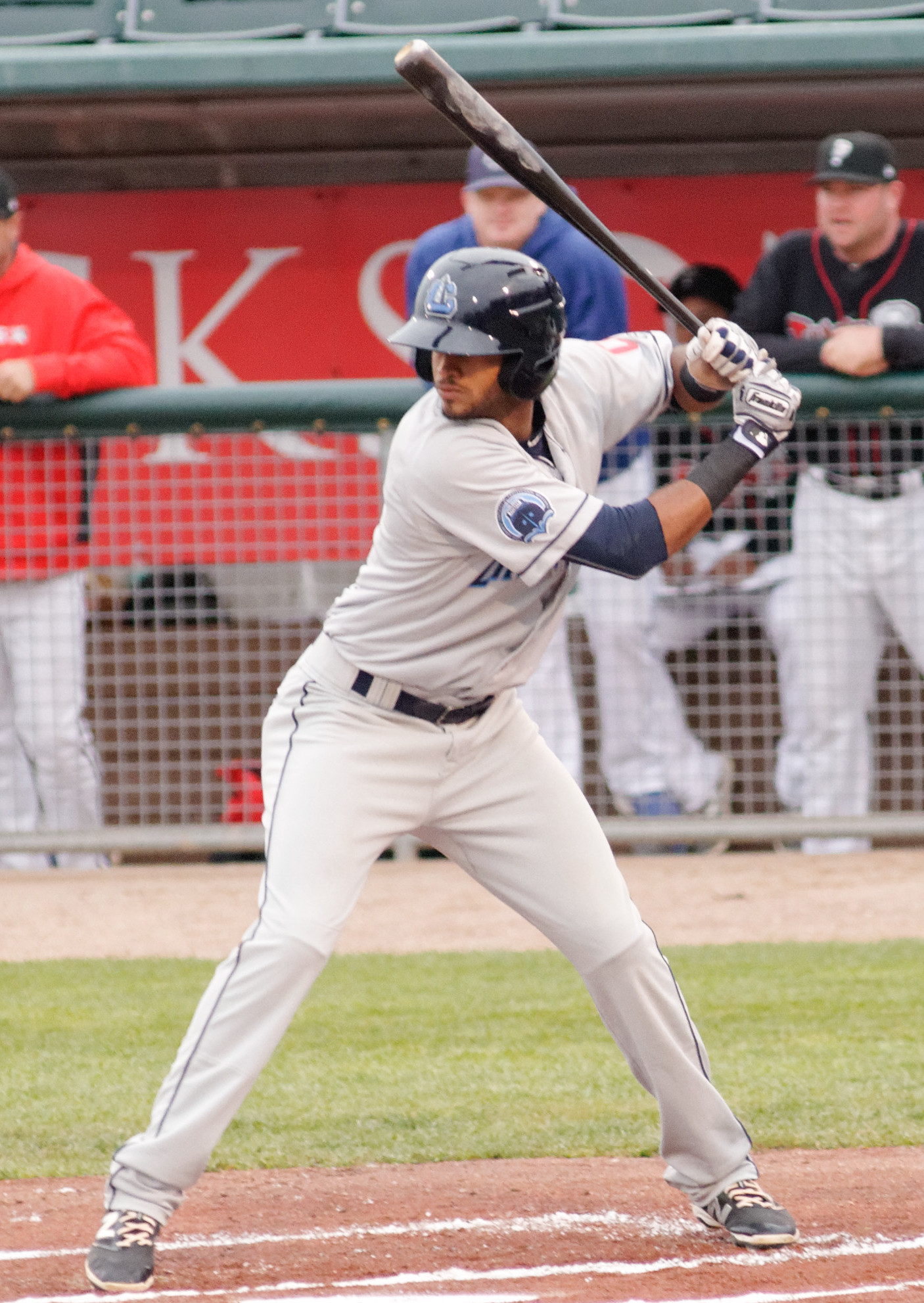
Castro with the Lake County Captains in 2016

Castro signed with the Cleveland Indians as an international free agent in July 2013. He made his professional debut in 2014 with the Arizona League Indians and spent the whole season there, batting .239/.285/.348 with two home runs and 11 RBIs in 43 games. He played 2015 with the Mahoning Valley Scrappers, where he batted .264 with one home run, 25 RBIs and twenty stolen bases, and 2016 with the Lake County Captains and Lynchburg Hillcats, slashing .258/.285/.368 with seven home runs and 49 RBIs. In 2017, Castro played for Lynchburg where he batted .290 with a career-high 11 home runs along with 58 RBIs, 19 stolen bases in 28 attempts and a .761 OPS. The Indians added him to their 40-man roster after the season.

MLB.com ranked Castro as Cleveland's fifth-best prospect going into the 2018 season. He opened the 2018 season with the Akron RubberDucks, with whom he batted .245/.303/.350 .

=== Detroit Tigers ===
On July 31, 2018, Castro was traded to the Detroit Tigers in exchange for Leonys Martín and Kyle Dowdy. Following the trade, he split the rest of the season between the Erie SeaWolves and the Toledo Mud Hens. He slashed .264/315/.392 across the three teams. He opened the 2019 season back with Toledo.

On August 24, 2019, the Tigers selected Castro's contract and promoted him to the major leagues. He made his major league debut that night versus the Minnesota Twins, going 2-for-4. On September 22, Castro hit his first major league home run off Josh Osich of the Chicago White Sox. He ended the season hitting .230/.284/.340 with 1 home run in 30 games.

Castro began the 2020 season at the Tigers' satellite training camp in Toledo. He was recalled to the major league club on August 13, 2020. In 129 at-bats during the 2020 season, Castro hit .349 with 6 home runs and 24 RBI.

Castro made the 2021 Tigers team out of spring training and played in his first opening-day game at the major league level. After Castro experienced some defensive struggles at shortstop, manager A. J. Hinch began playing him more at second base. On July 16, the Tigers demoted Castro to Triple–A Toledo. Through the All-Star break, Castro had posted a .214 batting average and 6 home runs, with a minus-10 Defensive Runs Saved rating at second base. Castro was recalled to the major league roster on July 22 to replace the injured Isaac Paredes. He finished the 2021 season batting .220/.273/.351 with 9 home runs, 38 RBIs, and 9 stolen bases in 13 attempts in 125 games.

On April 6, 2022, the Tigers optioned Castro to Triple–A Toledo to start the 2022 season. He was recalled to the Tigers on April 17 to replace the injured Javier Báez and batted .241/.284/.367.

On November 18, 2022, Castro was non-tendered by the Tigers and became a free agent.

=== Minnesota Twins ===
On December 30, 2022, Castro signed a minor league deal with the Minnesota Twins. On March 29, 2023, the Twins selected Castro's contract, adding him to the team's Opening Day roster. He appeared in 124 games with the Twins in 2023, slashing .257/.339/.411 and posting a career-high 2.7 WAR.

In 2024 Castro slashed .247/.331/.385 with 150 strikeouts in 558 at bats, and he was named to his first All-Star team in 2024.

On May 15, 2025, Castro recorded his 500th hit as a major leaguer, going 2–for–4 against the Baltimore Orioles. He made 86 appearances for the Twins, batting .245/.335/.407 with 10 home runs, 27 RBI, and nine stolen bases.

=== Chicago Cubs ===
On July 31, 2025, the Twins traded Castro to the Chicago Cubs in exchange for Ryan Gallagher and Sam Armstrong. Castro made 34 appearances for Chicago, batting .170/.245/.240 with one home run, six RBI, and one stolen base.

=== Colorado Rockies ===
On January 21, 2026, Castro signed a two-year, $12.8 million contract with the Colorado Rockies.

== Personal life ==
Castro is married to Aniana Rosario, a sister of Amed Rosario. They have a daughter together.
