= Texas League Most Valuable Player Award =

- Sport: Baseball
- League: Texas League
- Awarded for: Regular-season most valuable player of the Texas League
- Country: United States
- Presented by: Texas League

History
- First award: Dizzy Dean (1931)
- Most recent: Josue De Paula (2026)

The Texas League Most Valuable Player Award (MVP) is an annual award given to the best player in Minor League Baseball's Texas League based on their regular-season performance as voted on by league managers. League broadcasters, Minor League Baseball executives, and members of the media have previously voted as well. Though the league was established in 1888, the Player of the Year Award, as it was originally known, was not created until 1931. The Texas League suspended operations during World War II from 1943 to 1945. After the cancellation of the 2020 season, the league was known as the Double-A Central in 2021 before reverting to the Texas League name in 2022. The award became known as the Most Valuable Player Award in 2021.

Thirty-four outfielders have won the MVP Award, the most of any position. First basemen, with 21 winners, have won the most among infielders, followed by third basemen (15), second basemen (8), and shortstops (7). Five pitchers and four catchers have also won the award.

Fourteen players from the El Paso Diablos have been selected for the MVP Award, more than any other team in the league, followed by the San Antonio Missions (8); the Midland RockHounds and Ozarks Springbirds (7); the Arkansas Travelers and Beaumont Roughnecks (5); the Jackson Generals, Oklahoma City Indians, Tulsa Drillers, and Tulsa Oilers (4); the Amarillo Sonics, Dallas Eagles, Dallas–Fort Worth Spurs, and Northwest Arkansas Naturals (3); the Albuquerque Dodgers, Beaumont Golden Gators, Fort Worth Cats, Houston Buffaloes, Round Rock Express, and Wichita Wranglers (2); and the Alexandria Aces, Corpus Christi Giants, Corpus Christi Hooks, Galveston Buccaneers, Lafayette Drillers, Rio Grande Valley Giants, Shreveport Sports, and Victoria Rosebuds (1).

Thirteen players from the St. Louis Cardinals Major League Baseball (MLB) organization have won the award, more than any other, followed by the Los Angeles Angels and Los Angeles Dodgers organizations (8); the Houston Astros organization (7); the Baltimore Orioles and Milwaukee Brewers organizations (6); the Kansas City Royals, Oakland Athletics, and San Francisco Giants organizations (5); the Detroit Tigers and San Diego Padres organizations (4); the Chicago Cubs and New York Mets organizations (3); the Cleveland Guardians, New York Yankees, and Seattle Mariners organizations (2); and the Arizona Diamondbacks, Chicago White Sox, Colorado Rockies, Philadelphia Phillies, and Texas Rangers organizations (1). Five award winners played for teams that were not affiliated with any MLB organization.

== Winners ==
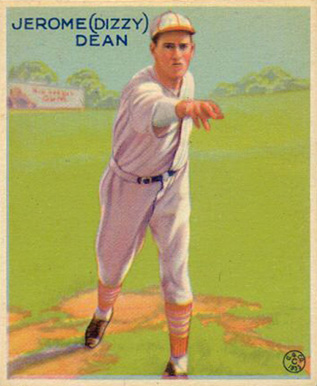
Dizzy Dean won the first Texas League Player of the Year Award in 1931 and was inducted into the Baseball Hall of Fame in 1953.

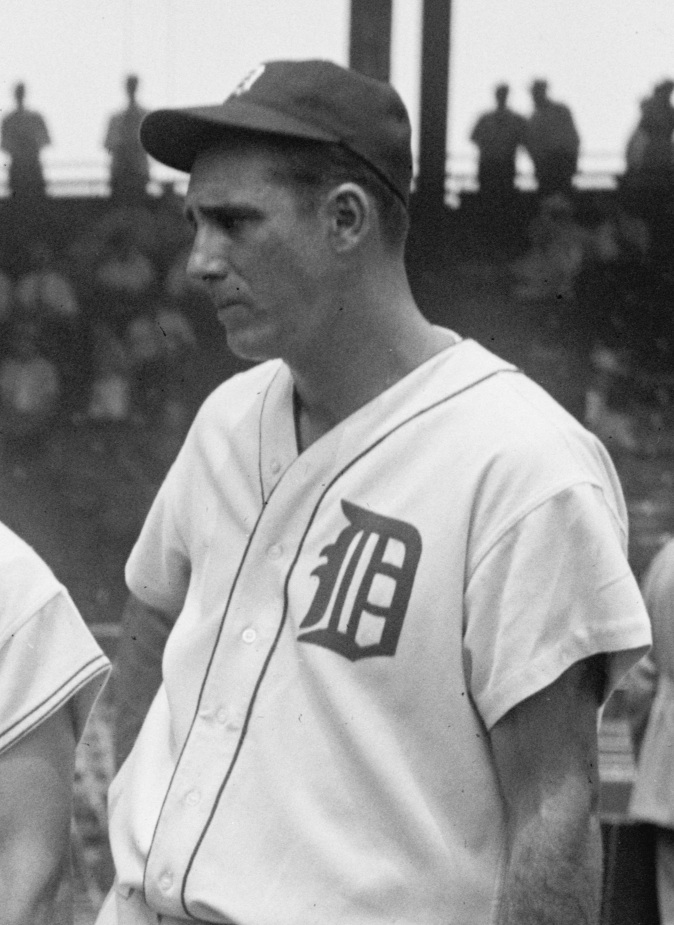
Hank Greenberg, the 1932 winner, won the American League MVP Award in 1935 and 1940 and was inducted into the Baseball Hall of Fame in 1956.

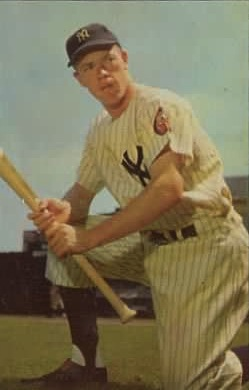
Gil McDougald, the 1950 recipient, was selected for the American League Rookie of the Year Award the next season.

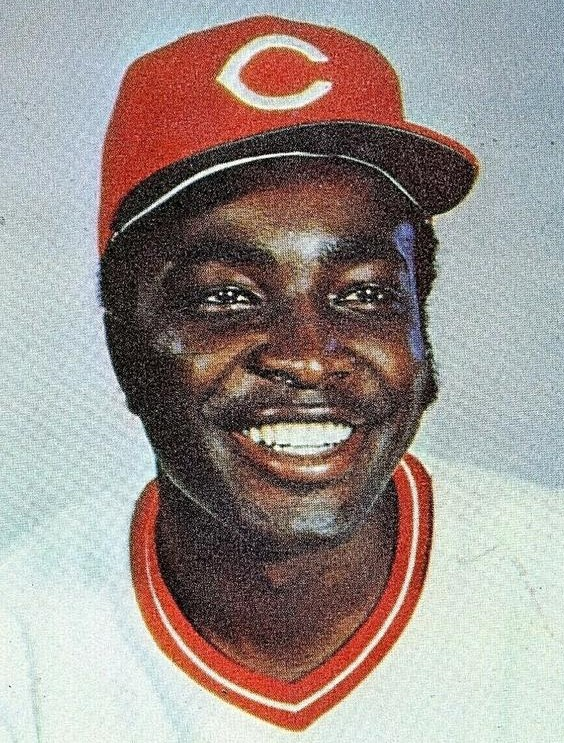
Joe Morgan, the 1964 winner, won the National League MVP Award in 1975 and 1976 and was inducted into the Baseball Hall of Fame in 1990.

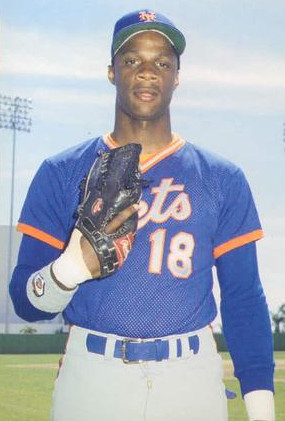
Darryl Strawberry, the 1982 winner, won the NL Rookie of the Year Award the next season.

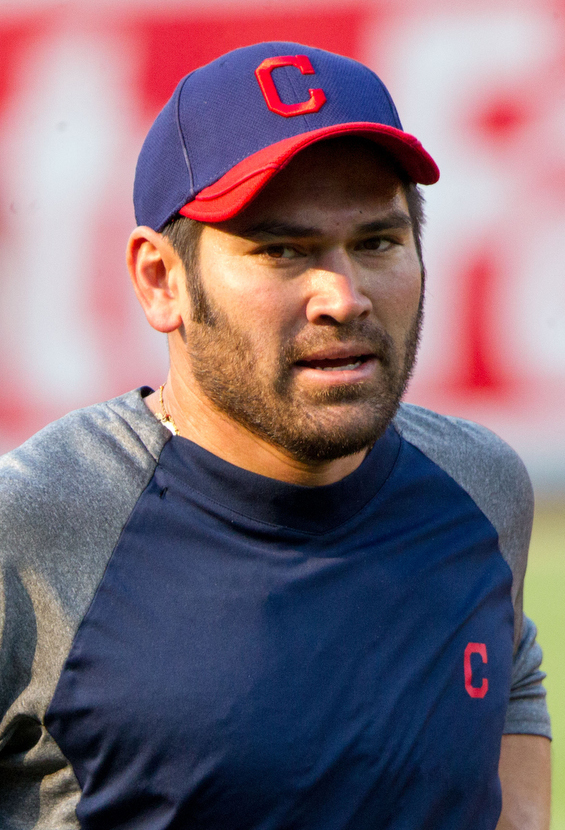
Johnny Damon, the 1995 Player of the Year, was selected for the Major League Baseball All-Star Game in 2002 and 2005.

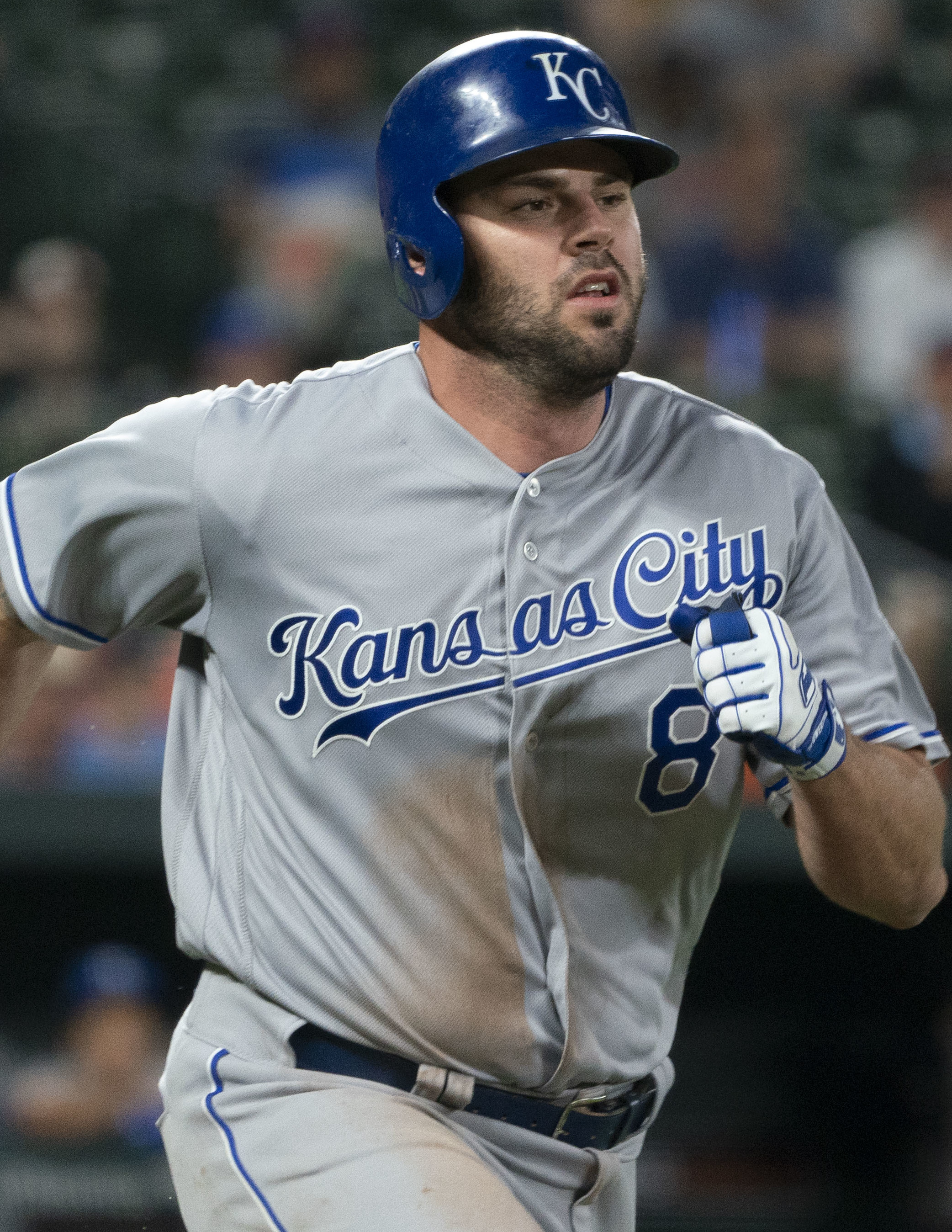
Mike Moustakas, the 2010 winner, was selected for the Major League Baseball All-Star Game in 2015, 2017, and 2019.

Key
Position	Indicates the player's primary position
^	Indicates multiple award winners in the same year

Winners
Year	Winner	Team	Organization	Position	Ref(s).
1931	Dizzy Dean	Houston Buffaloes	St. Louis Cardinals	Pitcher	
1932	Hank Greenberg	Beaumont Exporters	Detroit Tigers	First baseman	
1933	Zeke Bonura	Dallas Steers	—	First baseman	
1934	Charlie English	Galveston Buccaneers	—	Second baseman	
1935	Rudy York	Beaumont Exporters	Detroit Tigers	First baseman	
1936	Les Mallon	Dallas Steers	Chicago White Sox	Second baseman	
1937	Harold Hillin	Oklahoma City Indians	—	Pitcher	
1938	Dizzy Trout	Beaumont Exporters	Detroit Tigers	Pitcher	
1939	Nick Cullop	Houston Buffaloes	St. Louis Cardinals	Outfielder	
1940	Bob Muncrief	San Antonio Missions	St. Louis Browns	Pitcher	
1941	Rip Russell	Tulsa Oilers	Chicago Cubs	Third baseman	
1942	Dick Wakefield	Beaumont Exporters	Detroit Tigers	Outfielder	
1943	None selected (season cancelled due to World War II)				
1944	None selected (season cancelled due to World War II)				
1945	None selected (season cancelled due to World War II)				
1946	Hank Schenz	Tulsa Oilers	Chicago Cubs	Third baseman	
1947	Al Rosen	Oklahoma City Indians	Cleveland Indians	Third baseman	
1948	Irv Noren	Fort Worth Cats	Brooklyn Dodgers	Outfielder	
1949	Herb Conyers	Oklahoma City Indians	Cleveland Indians	First baseman	
1950	Gil McDougald	Beaumont Roughnecks	New York Yankees	Second baseman	
1951	Jim Dyck	San Antonio Missions	St. Louis Browns	Outfielder	
1952	Billy Hunter	Fort Worth Cats	Brooklyn Dodgers	Shortstop	
1953	Joe Frazier	Oklahoma City Indians	—	Outfielder	
1954	Frank Kellert	San Antonio Missions	Baltimore Orioles	First baseman	
1955	Ray Murray	Dallas Eagles	New York Giants	Catcher	
1956	Ken Guettler	Shreveport Sports	—	Outfielder	
1957	Jim Frey	Tulsa Oilers	Philadelphia Phillies	Outfielder	
1958	Michael Lutz	Corpus Christi Giants	San Francisco Giants	Outfielder	
1959	Carl Warwick	Victoria Rosebuds	Los Angeles Dodgers	Outfielder	
1960	Chuck Hiller	Rio Grande Valley Giants	San Francisco Giants	Second basemen	
1961	Phil Linz	Amarillo Gold Sox	New York Yankees	Shortstop	
1962	Cap Peterson	El Paso Sun Kings	San Francisco Giants	Shortstop	
1963	Jim Beauchamp	Tulsa Oilers	St. Louis Cardinals	Outfielder	
1964	Joe Morgan	San Antonio Bullets	Houston Colt .45's	Second baseman	
1965	Leo Posada	Amarillo Sonics	Houston Astros	Outfielder	
1966	Tommy Hutton	Albuquerque Dodgers	Los Angeles Dodgers	First baseman	
1967	Nate Colbert	Amarillo Sonics	Houston Astros	Outfielder	
1968^	Jim Spencer	El Paso Sun Kings	California Angels	First baseman	
1968^	Bill Sudakis	Albuquerque Dodgers	Los Angeles Dodgers	Third baseman	
1969^	Bobby Grich	Dallas–Fort Worth Spurs	Baltimore Orioles	Shortstop	
1969^	Larry Johnson	Dallas–Fort Worth Spurs	Baltimore Orioles	First baseman	
1970	Mickey Rivers	El Paso Sun Kings	California Angels	Outfielder	
1971	Enos Cabell	Dallas–Fort Worth Spurs	Baltimore Orioles	First baseman	
1972	Randy Elliott	Alexandria Aces	San Diego Padres	Outfielder	
1973	Héctor Cruz	Arkansas Travelers	St. Louis Cardinals	Outfielder	
1974	John Balaz	El Paso Diablos	California Angels	Outfielder	
1975	Gary Alexander	Lafayette Drillers	San Francisco Giants	Catcher	
1976	Willie Aikens	El Paso Diablos	California Angels	First baseman	
1977	Karl Pagel	Midland Cubs	Chicago Cubs	Outfielder	
1978	Bobby Clark	El Paso Diablos	California Angels	Outfielder	
1979	Mark Brouhard	El Paso Diablos	California Angels	Outfielder	
1980	Tim Leary	Jackson Mets	New York Mets	Pitcher	
1981	Steve Sax	San Antonio Dodgers	Los Angeles Dodgers	Second baseman	
1982	Darryl Strawberry	Jackson Mets	New York Mets	Outfielder	
1983	Mark Gillaspie	Beaumont Golden Gators	San Diego Padres	Outfielder	
1984	James Steels	Beaumont Golden Gators	San Diego Padres	Outfielder	
1985	Billy Jo Robidoux	El Paso Diablos	Milwaukee Brewers	First baseman	
1986	Steve Stanicek	El Paso Diablos	Milwaukee Brewers	First baseman	
1987	Gregg Jefferies	Jackson Mets	New York Mets	Shortstop	
1988	Jeff Manto	Midland Angels	California Angels	Third baseman	
1989	Ray Lankford	Arkansas Travelers	St. Louis Cardinals	Outfielder	
1990	Henry Rodríguez	San Antonio Missions	Los Angeles Dodgers	Outfielder	
1991	John Jaha	El Paso Diablos	Milwaukee Brewers	First baseman	
1992	Troy O'Leary	El Paso Diablos	Milwaukee Brewers	Outfielder	
1993	Roberto Petagine	Jackson Generals	Houston Astros	First baseman	
1994	Tim Unroe	El Paso Diablos	Milwaukee Brewers	Third baseman	
1995	Johnny Damon	Wichita Wranglers	Kansas City Royals	Outfielder	
1996	Bubba Smith	Tulsa Drillers	Texas Rangers	First baseman	
1997	Mike Kinkade	El Paso Diablos	Milwaukee Brewers	Third baseman	
1998	Tyrone Horne	Arkansas Travelers	St. Louis Cardinals	Outfielder	
1999	Adam Piatt	Midland RockHounds	Oakland Athletics	Third baseman	
2000	Keith Ginter	Round Rock Express	Houston Astros	Second baseman	
2001	Jason Lane	Round Rock Express	Houston Astros	Outfielder	
2002	Chad Tracy	El Paso Diablos	Arizona Diamondbacks	Third baseman	
2003	Justin Leone	San Antonio Missions	Seattle Mariners	Third baseman	
2004	Ryan Shealy	Tulsa Drillers	Colorado Rockies	First baseman	
2005	Andre Ethier	Midland RockHounds	Oakland Athletics	Outfielder	
2006	Alex Gordon	Wichita Wranglers	Kansas City Royals	Third baseman	
2007	Chase Headley	San Antonio Missions	San Diego Padres	Third baseman	
2008	Kila Kaʻaihue	Northwest Arkansas Naturals	Kansas City Royals	First baseman	
2009	Chris Carter	Midland RockHounds	Oakland Athletics	First baseman	
2010	Mike Moustakas	Northwest Arkansas Naturals	Kansas City Royals	Third baseman	
2011	Matt Adams	Springfield Cardinals	St. Louis Cardinals	First baseman	
2012	Oscar Taveras	Springfield Cardinals	St. Louis Cardinals	Outfielder	
2013	George Springer	Corpus Christi Hooks	Houston Astros	Outfielder	
2014	Alex Yarbrough	Arkansas Travelers	Los Angeles Angels of Anaheim	Second baseman	
2015	Chad Pinder	Midland RockHounds	Oakland Athletics	Shortstop	
2016	Matt Chapman	Midland RockHounds	Oakland Athletics	Third baseman	
2017	Matt Beaty	Tulsa Drillers	Los Angeles Dodgers	First baseman	
2018	Joey Curletta	Arkansas Travelers	Seattle Mariners	First baseman	
2019	Dylan Carlson	Springfield Cardinals	St. Louis Cardinals	Outfielder	
2020	None selected (season cancelled due to COVID-19 pandemic)				
2021	MJ Melendez	Northwest Arkansas Naturals	Kansas City Royals	Catcher	
2022	Moisés Gómez	Springfield Cardinals	St. Louis Cardinals	Outfielder	
2023	Thomas Saggese	Springfield Cardinals	St. Louis Cardinals	Third baseman	
2024	Jimmy Crooks	Springfield Cardinals	St. Louis Cardinals	Catcher	
2025	JJ Wetherholt	Springfield Cardinals	St. Louis Cardinals	Shortstop	
2026	Josue De Paula	Tulsa Drillers	Los Angeles Dodgers	Outfielder	

== Wins by team ==
Active Texas League teams appear in bold.

Team	Award(s)	Year(s)
El Paso Diablos (El Paso Sun Kings)	14	1962, 1968, 1970, 1974, 1976, 1978, 1979, 1985, 1986, 1991, 1992, 1994, 1997, 2002
**San Antonio Missions** (San Antonio Bullets/Dodgers)	8	1940, 1951, 1954, 1964, 1981, 1990, 2003, 2007
**Midland RockHounds** (Midland Cubs/Angels)	7	1977, 1988, 1999, 2005, 2009, 2015, 2016
**Ozarks Springbirds** (Springfield Cardinals)	7	2011, 2012, 2019, 2022, 2023, 2024, 2025
**Arkansas Travelers**	5	1976, 1989, 1998, 2014, 2018
Beaumont Roughnecks (Beaumont Exporters)	5	1932, 1935, 1938, 1942, 1950
Jackson Generals (Jackson Mets)	4	1980, 1982, 1987, 1993
Oklahoma City Indians	4	1937, 1947, 1949, 1953
**Tulsa Drillers**	4	1996, 2004, 2017, 2026
Tulsa Oilers	4	1941, 1946, 1957, 1963
Amarillo Sonics (Amarillo Gold Sox)	3	1961, 1965, 1967
Dallas Eagles (Dallas Steers)	3	1933, 1936, 1955
Dallas–Fort Worth Spurs	3	1969, (Note: Two players from Dallas–Fort Worth were selected as MVPs in 1969.) 1971
**Northwest Arkansas Naturals**	3	2008, 2010, 2021
Albuquerque Dodgers	2	1966, 1968
Beaumont Golden Gators	2	1983, 1984
Fort Worth Cats	2	1948, 1952
Houston Buffaloes	2	1931, 1939
Round Rock Express	2	2000, 2001
Wichita Wranglers	2	1995, 2006
Alexandria Aces	1	1972
Corpus Christi Giants	1	1958
**Corpus Christi Hooks**	1	2013
Galveston Buccaneers	1	1934
Lafayette Drillers	1	1975
Rio Grande Valley Giants	1	1960
Shreveport Sports	1	1956
Victoria Rosebuds	1	1959

== Wins by organization ==
Active Texas League–Major League Baseball affiliations appear in bold.

Organization	Award(s)	Year(s)
**St. Louis Cardinals**	13	1931, 1939, 1963, 1973, 1989, 1998, 2011, 2012, 2019, 2022, 2023, 2024, 2025
Los Angeles Angels (California Angels)	8	1959, 1968, 1970, 1974, 1976, 1978, 1979, 1988
**Los Angeles Dodgers** (Brooklyn Dodgers)	8	1948, 1952, 1966, 1968, 1981, 1990, 2017, 2026
**Houston Astros** (Houston Colt .45's)	7	1964, 1965, 1967, 1993, 2000, 2001, 2013
Baltimore Orioles (St. Louis Browns)	6	1940, 1951, 1954, 1969, (Note: Two players from the Baltimore organization were selected as MVPs in 1969.) 1971
Milwaukee Brewers	6	1985, 1986, 1991, 1992, 1994, 1997
**Kansas City Royals**	5	1995, 2006, 2008, 2010, 2021
**Oakland Athletics**	5	1999, 2005, 2009, 2015, 2016
San Francisco Giants (New York Giants)	5	1955, 1958, 1960, 1962, 1975
Detroit Tigers	4	1932, 1935, 1938, 1942
**San Diego Padres**	4	1972, 1983, 1984, 2007
Chicago Cubs	3	1941, 1946, 1977
New York Mets	3	1980, 1982, 1987
Cleveland Guardians (Cleveland Indians)	2	1947, 1949
New York Yankees	2	1950, 1961
**Seattle Mariners**	2	2003, 2018
**Arizona Diamondbacks**	1	2002
Chicago White Sox	1	1936
Colorado Rockies	1	2004
Philadelphia Phillies	1	1957
**Texas Rangers**	1	1957
