= Texas League Manager of the Year Award =

- Sport: Baseball
- League: Texas League
- Awarded for: Best regular-season manager in the Texas League
- Country: United States
- Presented by: Texas League

History
- First award: Red Davis (1955)
- Most wins: Jackie Moore (3)
- Most recent: Eric Wedge (2026)

The Texas League Manager of the Year Award is an annual award given to the best manager in Minor League Baseball's Texas League based on their regular-season performance as voted on by league managers. Broadcasters, Minor League Baseball executives, and members of the media have previously voted as well. Though the league was established in 1888, the award was not created until 1955. The Texas League suspended operations during World War II from 1943 to 1945. After the cancellation of the 2020 season, the league was known as the Double-A Central in 2021 before reverting to the Texas League name in 2022.

The only manager to win the award on three occasions is Jackie Moore, who won in 2000, 2001, and 2004. Four others have each won twice: Red Davis, Andy Gilbert, Tim Ireland, and Phillip Wellman. Davis (1955 and 1956) and Moore (2000 and 2001) won the award in consecutive years.

Eight managers from the El Paso Diablos have been selected for the Manager of the Year Award, more than any other team in the league, followed by the San Antonio Missions (6); the Arkansas Travelers, Midland RockHounds, and Tulsa Drillers (5); the Amarillo Gold Sox, Corpus Christi Hooks, Frisco RoughRiders, and Jackson Generals (4); the Dallas Eagles and Round Rock Express (3); the Dallas–Fort Worth Spurs, Ozarks Springbirds, Shreveport Captains, and Wichita Wranglers (2); and the Albuquerque Dodgers, Alexandria Aces, Amarillo Sod Poodles, Houston Buffaloes, Lafayette Drillers, Memphis Blues, Northwest Arkansas Naturals, Rio Grande Valley Giants, Tulsa Oilers, Victoria Rosebuds, and Wichita Turbo Tubs (1).

Nine managers from the Houston Astros Major League Baseball (MLB) organization have won the award, more than any other, followed by the San Francisco Giants, St. Louis Cardinals, and Texas Rangers organizations (8); the San Diego Padres organization (7); the Los Angeles Angels organization (5); the Los Angeles Dodgers, Milwaukee Brewers, and New York Mets organizations (4); the Kansas City Royals and Oakland Athletics organizations (3); the Chicago Cubs and Seattle Mariners organizations (2); and the Baltimore Orioles, Cleveland Guardians, and Minnesota Twins organizations (1).

== Winners ==
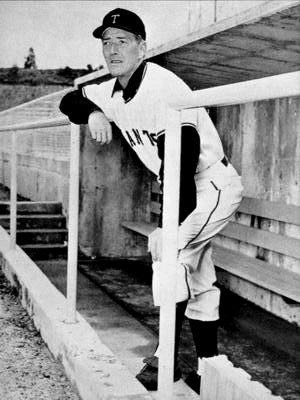
Red Davis won the first two Texas League Manager of the Year Awards in 1955 and 1956.

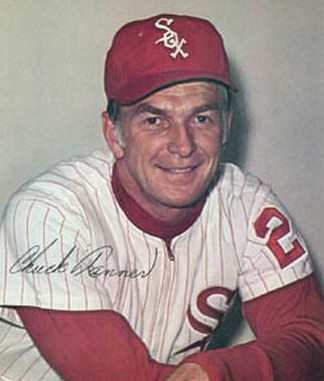
Chuck Tanner, the 1968 winner, led the Pittsburgh Pirates to win the 1979 World Series.

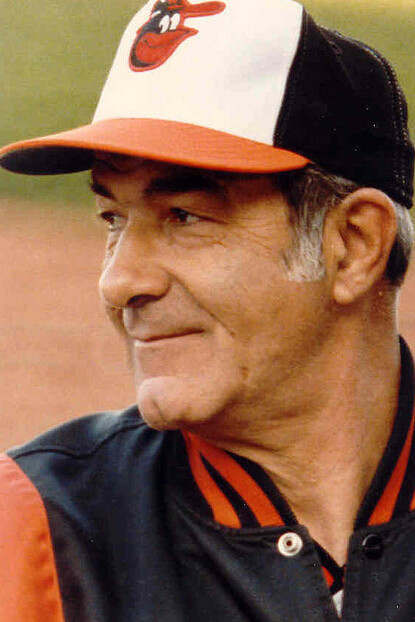
Joe Altobelli, the 1969 co-winner, led the Baltimore Orioles to win the 1983 World Series.

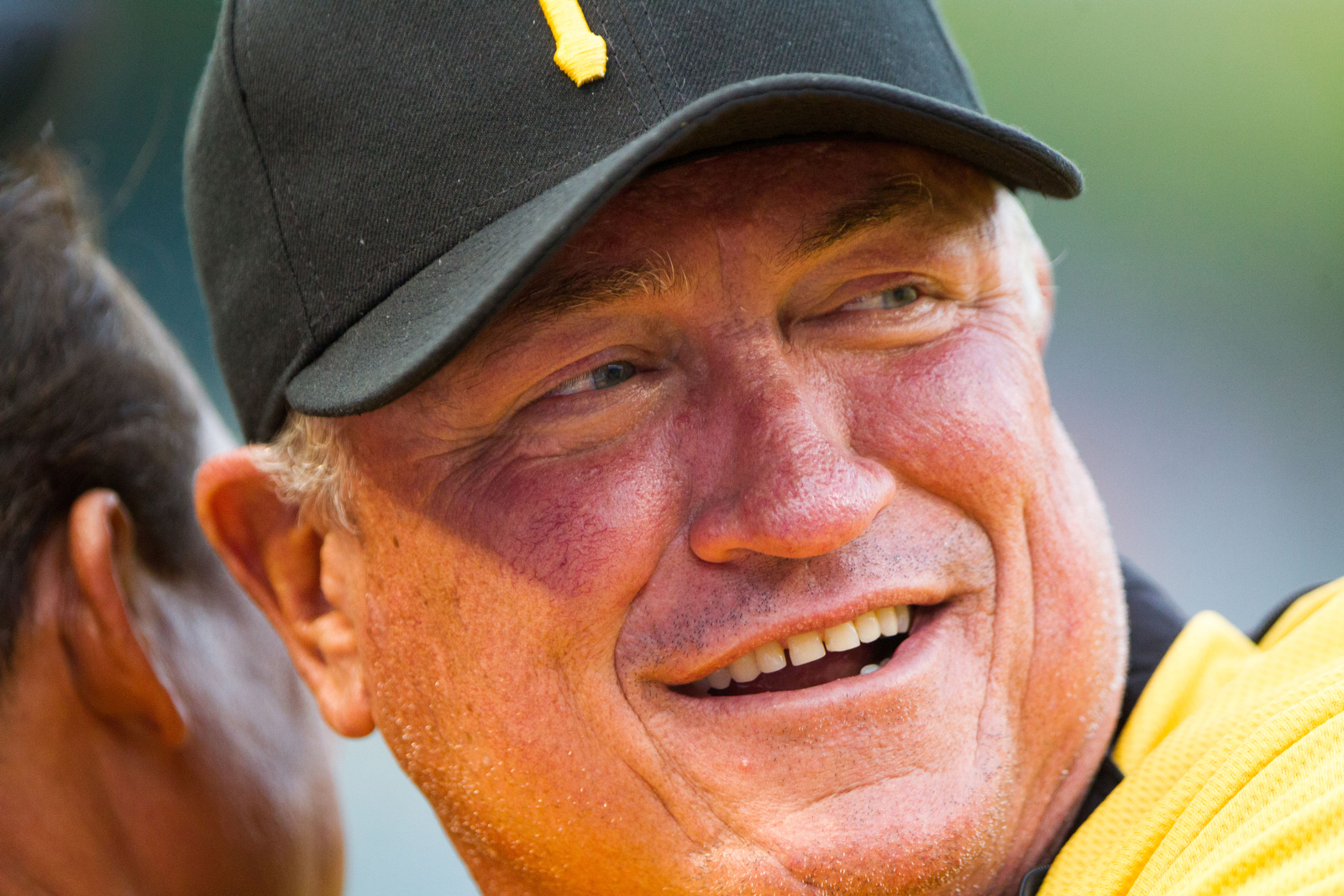
Clint Hurdle, the 1990 winner, won the 2013 National League Manager of the Year Award.

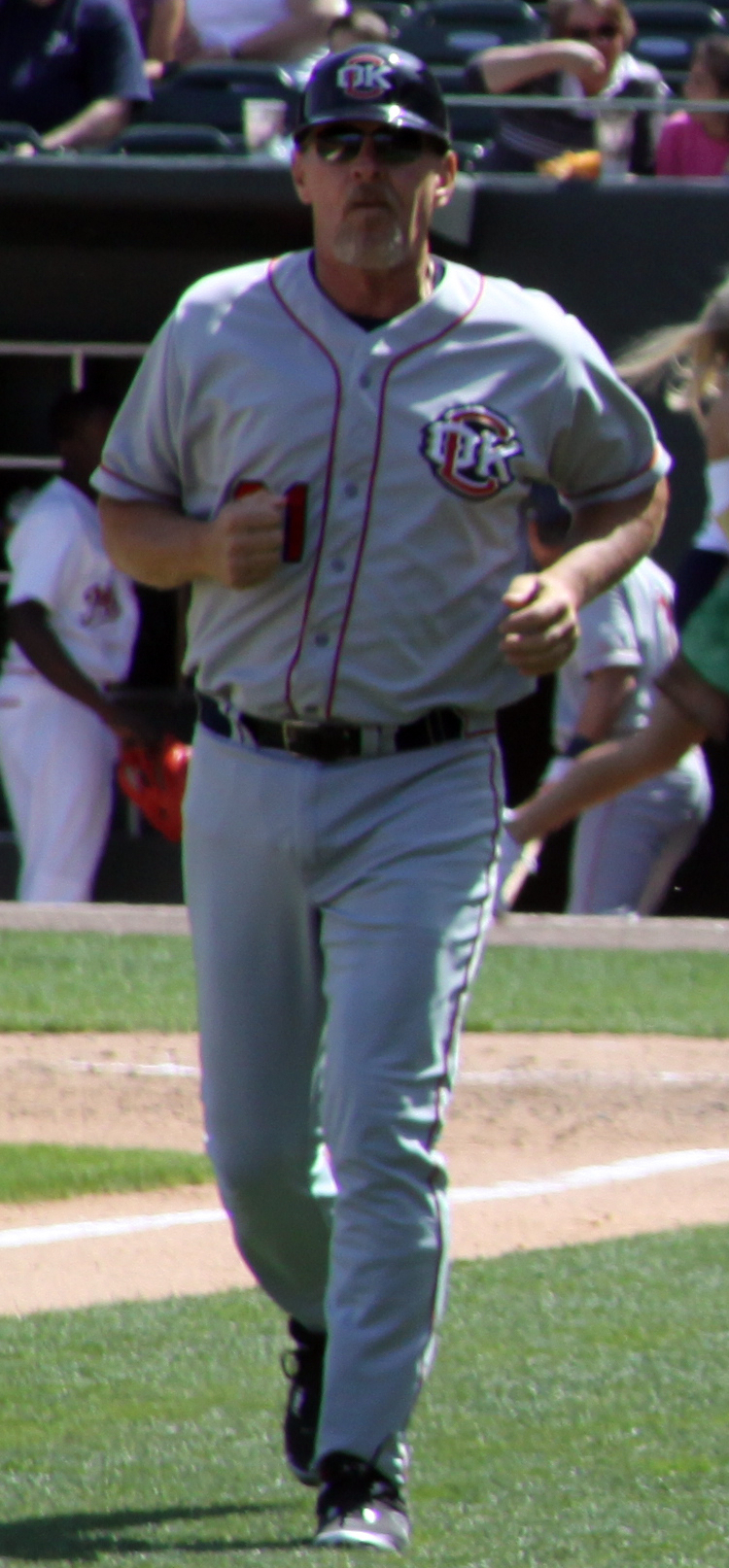
Bobby Jones, the 1992 winner, was the recipient of the 2008 Mike Coolbaugh Award.

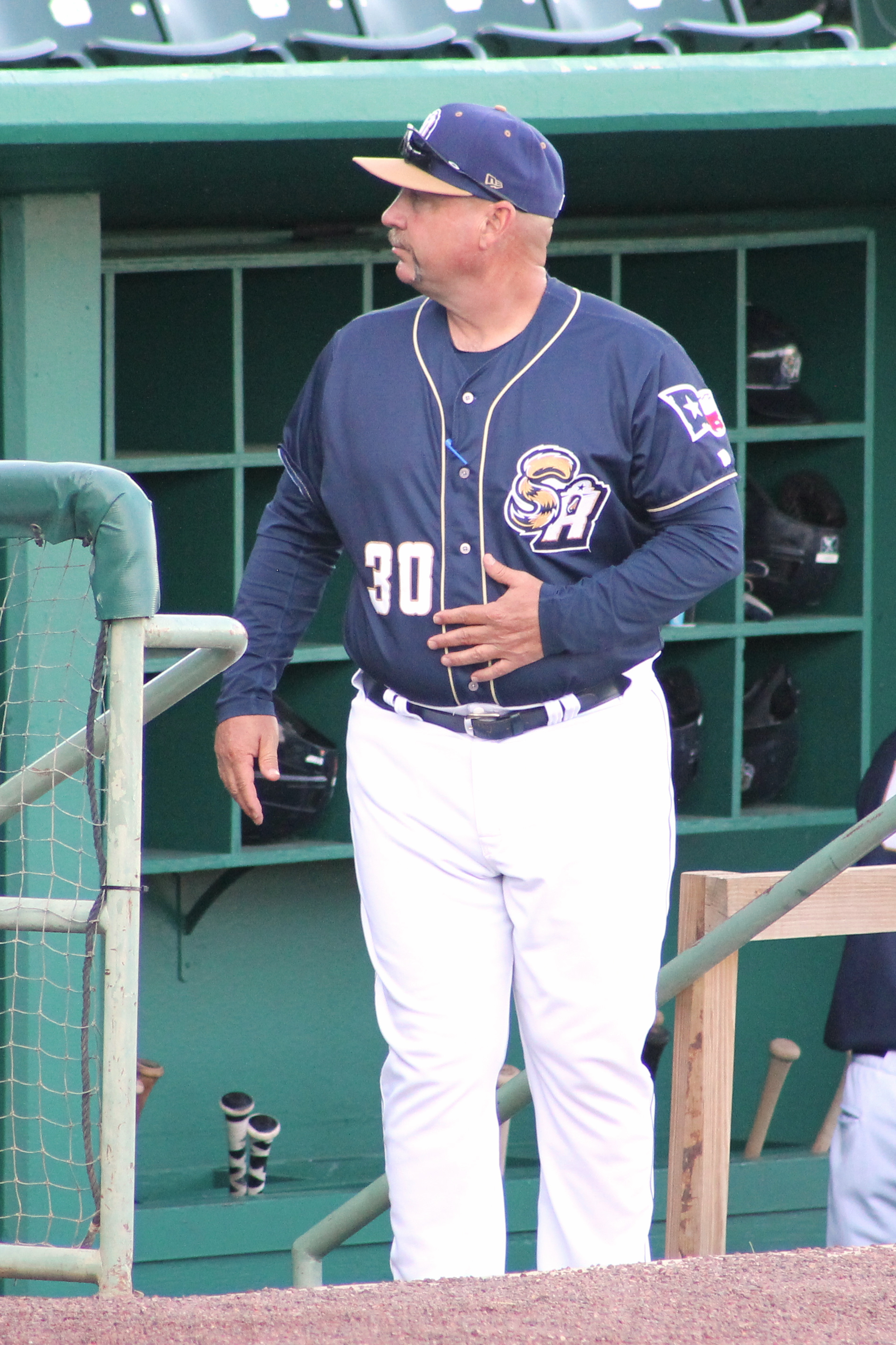
Phillip Wellman won the award in 2017 and 2019.

Key
League	The team's final position in the league standings
Division	The team's final position in the divisional standings
Record	The team's wins and losses during the regular season
(#)	Number of wins by managers who won the award multiple times
^	Indicates multiple award winners in the same year
*	Indicates league champions

Winners
Year	Winner	Team	Organization	League	Division	Record	Ref(s).
1955	Red Davis (1)	Dallas Eagles	New York Giants	1st	—	93–67	
1956	Red Davis (2)	Dallas Eagles	New York Giants	2nd	—	94–60	
1957	Salty Parker	Dallas Eagles	New York Giants	1st	—	102–52	
1958	Harry Walker	Houston Buffaloes	St. Louis Cardinals	2nd	—	79–74	
1959	Pete Reiser	Victoria Rosebuds	Los Angeles Dodgers	1st	—	86–60	
1960	Ray Murray	Rio Grande Valley Giants	San Francisco Giants	1st	—	85–59	
1961	None selected						
1962	None selected						
1963	None selected						
1964	Grover Resinger	Tulsa Oilers	St. Louis Cardinals	2nd	—	79–61	
1965	Whitey Lockman	Dallas–Fort Worth Spurs	Chicago Cubs	2nd	2nd	80–61	
1966	Vern Rapp	Arkansas Travelers	St. Louis Cardinals	1st	—	81–59	
1967	Buddy Hancken	Amarillo Sonics	Houston Astros	2nd	—	75–65	
1968	Chuck Tanner	El Paso Sun Kings*	California Angels	2nd	1st	77–60	
1969^	Joe Altobelli	Dallas–Fort Worth Spurs	Baltimore Orioles	2nd	2nd	75–58	
1969^	Roy McMillan	Memphis Blues*	New York Mets	4th	1st	66–65	
1970^	Del Crandall	Albuquerque Dodgers*	Los Angeles Dodgers	1st	1st	83–52	
1970^	Del Rice	El Paso Sun Kings	California Angels	2nd	2nd	77–59	
1971	Andy Gilbert (1)	Amarillo Giants	San Francisco Giants	1st	1st	88–54	
1972	Duke Snider	Alexandria Aces	San Diego Padres	1st	1st	84–56	
1973	Tony Pacheco	San Antonio Brewers	Cleveland Indians	1st	1st	82–57	
1974	Dave Garcia	El Paso Diablos	California Angels	3rd	1st	76–61	
1975	Dennis Sommers	Lafayette Drillers* (Note: Lafayette and the Midland Cubs were declared co-champions after the playoffs were cancelled due to unplayable field conditions.)	San Francisco Giants	3rd	1st	72–57	
1976	Bob Miller	Amarillo Gold Sox*	San Diego Padres	1st	1st	81–54	
1977	Buck Rodgers	El Paso Diablos	California Angels	1st	1st	78–52	
1978	Jim Saul	Midland Cubs	Chicago Cubs	5th	3rd	70–65	
1979	Andy Gilbert (2)	Shreveport Captains	San Francisco Giants	3rd	2nd	73–62	
1980	Bob Wellman	Jackson Mets	New York Mets	4th (tie)	3rd	74–62	
1981	Eddie Watt	Amarillo Gold Sox	San Diego Padres	2nd	2nd	77–59	
1982	Tom Burgess	Tulsa Drillers*	Texas Rangers	2nd	1st	70–66	
1983	Nick Leyva	Arkansas Travelers	St. Louis Cardinals	3rd (tie)	2nd (tie)	69–67	
1984	Sam Perlozzo	Jackson Mets*	New York Mets	2nd	1st	83–53	
1985	Terry Bevington	El Paso Diablos	Milwaukee Brewers	1st	1st	86–50	
1986	Wendell Kim	Shreveport Captains	San Francisco Giants	2nd	1st	80–56	
1987	Duffy Dyer	El Paso Diablos	Milwaukee Brewers	2nd	1st	75–59	
1988	Jim Skaalen	Tulsa Drillers*	Texas Rangers	4th	2nd	71–65	
1989	Gaylen Pitts	Arkansas Travelers*	St. Louis Cardinals	1st	1st	79–56	
1990	Clint Hurdle	Jackson Mets	New York Mets	3rd	1st	73–62	
1991	Don Long	Midland Angels	California Angels	5th	3rd	67–68	
1992	Bobby Jones	Tulsa Drillers	Texas Rangers	1st (tie)	1st (tie)	77–59	
1993	Sal Butera	Jackson Generals*	Houston Astros	2nd	1st	73–62	
1994	Tim Ireland (1)	El Paso Diablos*	Milwaukee Brewers	1st	1st	88–48	
1995	Ron Johnson	Wichita Wranglers	Kansas City Royals	2nd	1st	72–64	
1996	Dave Machemer	El Paso Diablos	Milwaukee Brewers	1st	1st	76–63	
1997	Ron Roenicke	San Antonio Missions*	Los Angeles Dodgers	1st	1st	84–55	
1998	Chris Maloney	Arkansas Travelers	St. Louis Cardinals	1st	1st	80–60	
1999	John Mizerock	Wichita Wranglers*	Kansas City Royals	1st	1st	83–57	
2000	Jackie Moore (1)	Round Rock Express*	Houston Astros	1st	1st	83–57	
2001	Jackie Moore (2)	Round Rock Express	Houston Astros	1st	1st	86–54	
2002	Tim Ireland (2)	Tulsa Drillers	Texas Rangers	5th	2nd	72–67	
2003	Dave Brundage	San Antonio Missions*	Seattle Mariners	1st	1st	80–51	
2004	Jackie Moore (3)	Round Rock Express	Houston Astros	1st	1st	86–54	
2005	Von Hayes	Midland RockHounds*	Oakland Athletics	1st	1st	78–62	
2006	Dave Clark	Corpus Christi Hooks*	Houston Astros	3rd	2nd	76–63	
2007	Dave Anderson	Frisco RoughRiders	Texas Rangers	1st	1st	85–55	
2008	Scott Little	Frisco RoughRiders	Texas Rangers	1st	1st	84–56	
2009	Darren Bush	Midland RockHounds*	Oakland Athletics	1st	1st	78–62	
2010	Brian Poldberg	Northwest Arkansas Naturals*	Kansas City Royals	1st	1st	86–54	
2011	Doug Dascenzo	San Antonio Missions*	San Diego Padres	1st	1st	94–46	
2012	Keith Bodie	Corpus Christi Hooks	Houston Astros	1st	1st	81–59	
2013	Rich Dauer	San Antonio Missions*	San Diego Padres	2nd	2nd	78–61	
2014	Jason Wood	Frisco RoughRiders	Texas Rangers	1st	1st	80–59	
2015	Rodney Linares	Corpus Christi Hooks	Houston Astros	1st	1st	89–51	
2016	Ryan Christenson	Midland RockHounds*	Oakland Athletics	2nd	2nd	78–62	
2017	Phillip Wellman (1)	San Antonio Missions	San Diego Padres	1st	1st	78–62	
2018	Omar López	Corpus Christi Hooks	Houston Astros	1st	1st	82–56	
2019	Phillip Wellman (2)	Amarillo Sod Poodles*	San Diego Padres	4th	2nd	72–66	
2020	None selected (season cancelled due to COVID-19 pandemic)						
2021	Ramon Borrego	Wichita Wind Surge	Minnesota Twins	1st	1st	69–51	
2022	Jared Goedert	Frisco RoughRiders*	Texas Rangers	2nd	1st	74–63	
2023	Mike Freeman	Arkansas Travelers	Seattle Mariners	2nd	1st	73–65	
2024	Jose Leger	Springfield Cardinals	St. Louis Cardinals	4th	2nd	79–59	
2025	Patrick Anderson	Springfield Cardinals*	St. Louis Cardinals	1st	1st	88–50	
2026	Eric Wedge	Tulsa Drillers	Los Angeles Dodgers	1st	1st	88–50	

== Wins by team ==
Active Texas League teams appear in bold.

Team	Award(s)	Year(s)
El Paso Diablos (El Paso Sun Kings)	8	1968, 1970, 1974, 1977, 1985, 1987, 1994, 1996
**San Antonio Missions** (San Antonio Brewers)	6	1973, 1997, 2003, 2011, 2013, 2017
**Arkansas Travelers**	5	1966, 1983, 1989, 1998, 2023
**Midland RockHounds** (Midland Cubs/Angels)	5	1978, 1991, 2005, 2009, 2016
**Tulsa Drillers**	5	1982, 1988, 1992, 2002, 2026
Amarillo Gold Sox (Amarillo Sonics/Giants)	4	1967, 1971, 1976, 1981
**Corpus Christi Hooks**	4	2006, 2012, 2015, 2018
**Frisco RoughRiders**	4	2007, 2008, 2014, 2022
Jackson Generals (Jackson Mets)	4	1980, 1984, 1990, 1993
Dallas Eagles	3	1955, 1956, 1957
Round Rock Express	3	2000, 2001, 2004
Dallas–Fort Worth Spurs	2	1965, 1969
**Ozarks Springbirds** (Springfield Cardinals)	2	2024, 2025
Shreveport Captains	2	1979, 1986
Wichita Wranglers	2	1995, 1999
Albuquerque Dodgers	1	1970
Alexandria Aces	1	1972
**Amarillo Sod Poodles**	1	2019
Houston Buffaloes	1	1958
Lafayette Drillers	1	1975
Memphis Blues	1	1969
**Northwest Arkansas Naturals**	1	2010
Rio Grande Valley Giants	1	1960
Tulsa Oilers	1	1964
Victoria Rosebuds	1	1959
**Wichita Turbo Tubs** (Wichita Wind Surge)	1	2021

== Wins by organization ==
Active Texas League–Major League Baseball affiliations appear in bold.

Organization	Award(s)	Year(s)
**Houston Astros**	9	1967, 1993, 2000, 2001, 2004, 2006, 2012, 2015, 2018
San Francisco Giants (New York Giants)	8	1955, 1956, 1957, 1960, 1971, 1975, 1979, 1986
**St. Louis Cardinals**	8	1958, 1964, 1966, 1983, 1989, 1998, 2024, 2025
**Texas Rangers**	8	1982, 1988, 1992, 2002, 2007, 2008, 2014, 2022
**San Diego Padres**	7	1972, 1976, 1981, 2011, 2013, 2017, 2019
Los Angeles Angels (California Angels)	5	1968, 1970, 1974, 1977, 1991
**Los Angeles Dodgers**	4	1959, 1970, 1997, 2026
Milwaukee Brewers	4	1985, 1987, 1994, 1996
New York Mets	4	1969, 1980, 1984, 1990
**Kansas City Royals**	3	1995, 1999, 2010
**Oakland Athletics**	3	2005, 2009, 2016
Chicago Cubs	2	1965, 1978
**Seattle Mariners**	2	2003, 2023
Baltimore Orioles	1	1969
Cleveland Guardians (Cleveland Indians)	1	1973
**Minnesota Twins**	1	2021
