= List of Texas League champions =

The Texas League of Minor League Baseball is a Double-A baseball league in the United States. The circuit was founded in 1888 and ran through 1892. After two years of dormancy, it was revived as the Texas Association in 1895, the Texas-Southern League in 1896, and the Texas League from 1897 to 1899. With the exception of three years during World War II (1943–1945) and one year during the COVID-19 pandemic (2020), the Texas League has been in continual operation since 1902.

A league champion is determined at the end of each season. Champions have been determined by postseason playoffs, winning the regular season pennant, or being declared champion by the league office. From 1952 to 1964, the league recognized both a pennant winner and a playoff winner; they were declared co-champions. For the 2019 season, the first-half and second-half winners within each division (North and South) met in a best-of-five series to determine division champions. Then, the North and South Division winners played a best-of-five series to determine a league champion. In 2021, the Double-A Central held a best-of-five series between the top two teams in the league, regardless of division standings, to determine a league champion. As of 2022, the winners of each division from both the first and second halves of the season meet in a best-of-three division series, with the winners of the two division series meeting in a best-of-three championship series.

The 2020 season was cancelled due to the COVID-19 pandemic, and the league ceased operations before the 2021 season in conjunction with Major League Baseball's (MLB) reorganization of Minor League Baseball. In place of the Texas League, MLB created the Double-A Central, which was divided into two divisions. Prior to the 2022 season, MLB renamed the Double-A Central as the Texas League, and it carried on the history of the league prior to reorganization.

== Key ==
^	Indicates pennant winner (1952–1964, 1966)
†	Indicates playoff winner (1952–1964, 1966)
‡	Indicates pennant and playoff winner (1952–1964, 1966)

== League champions ==
Score and finalist information is presented when postseason play occurred. The lack of this information indicates a league champion by virtue of finishing the season in first place or missing information.

Year	Champion	Score	Finalist
1888	Dallas Hams	—	—
1889	Houston Mud Cats	—	—
1890	Galveston Sand Crabs	—	—
1891	Not in operation		
1892	Houston Mud Cats	—	—
1893	Not in operation		
1894	Not in operation		
1895	Fort Worth Panthers	7–6	Dallas Steers
1896	Houston Buffaloes	5–2	Galveston Sand Crabs
1897^{[a]}	Galveston Sand Crabs; San Antonio Bronchos	—	—
1898	None awarded	—	
1899	Galveston Sand Crabs	—	—
1900	Not in operation		
1901	Not in operation		
1902	Corsicana Oil Citys	—	—
1903	Dallas Giants	7–3	Waco Steers
1904	Corsicana Oil Citys	11–8	Fort Worth Panthers
1905	Fort Worth Panthers	—	—
1906	Cleburne Railroaders	—	—
1907	Austin Senators	—	—
1908	San Antonio Bronchos	—	—
1909	Houston Buffaloes	—	—
1910^{[b]}	Dallas Giants; Houston Buffaloes	—	—
1911	Austin Senators	—	—
1912	Houston Buffaloes	—	—
1913	Houston Buffaloes	—	—
1914^{[c]}	Waco Navigators; Houston Buffaloes	—	—
1915	Waco Navigators	—	—
1916	Waco Navigators	—	—
1917	Dallas Giants	—	—
1918	Dallas Giants	—	—
1919	Shreveport Gassers	4–2	Fort Worth Panthers
1920	Fort Worth Panthers	—	—
1921	Fort Worth Panthers	—	—
1922	Fort Worth Panthers	—	—
1923	Fort Worth Panthers	—	—
1924	Fort Worth Panthers	—	—
1925	Fort Worth Panthers	—	—
1926	Dallas Steers	—	—
1927	Wichita Falls Spudders	—	—
1928	Houston Buffaloes	3–1	Wichita Falls Spudders
1929	Dallas Steers	3–1	Wichita Falls Spudders
1930	Fort Worth Panthers	3–2	Wichita Falls Spudders
1931	Houston Buffaloes	—	—
1932	Beaumont Exporters	3–0	Dallas Steers
1933	San Antonio Missions	4–2	Galveston Buccaneers
1934	Galveston Buccaneers	4–2	San Antonio Missions
1935	Oklahoma City Indians	4–1	Beaumont Exporters
1936	Tulsa Oilers	4–3	Dallas Steers
1937	Fort Worth Cats	4–2	Oklahoma City Indians
1938	Beaumont Exporters	4–3	San Antonio Missions
1939	Fort Worth Cats	4–1	Dallas Rebels
1940	Houston Buffaloes	4–1	Oklahoma City Indians
1941	Dallas Rebels	4–2	Tulsa Oilers
1942	Shreveport Sports	4–3	Beaumont Exporters
1943	Not in operation		
1944	Not in operation		
1945	Not in operation		
1946	Dallas Rebels	4–1	Fort Worth Cats
1947	Houston Buffaloes	4–2	Dallas Rebels
1948	Fort Worth Cats	4–2	Tulsa Oilers
1949	Tulsa Oilers	4–3	Fort Worth Cats
1950	San Antonio Missions	4–2	Tulsa Oilers
1951	Houston Buffalos	4–0	San Antonio Missions
1952	Dallas Eagles^{^}	—	—
1952	Shreveport Sports^{†}	4–1	Oklahoma City Indians
1953	Dallas Eagles^{‡}	4–1	Tulsa Oilers
1954	Shreveport Sports^{^}	—	—
1954	Houston Buffalos^{†}	4–1	Fort Worth Cats
1955	Dallas Eagles^{^}	—	—
1955	Shreveport Sports^{†}	4–3	Houston Buffalos
1956	Houston Buffalos^{‡}	4–1	Dallas Eagles
1957	Dallas Eagles^{^}	—	—
1957	Houston Buffalos^{†}	4–3	Dallas Eagles
1958	Fort Worth Cats^{^}	—	—
1958	Corpus Christi Giants^{†}	4–3	Austin Senators
1959	Victoria Rosebuds^{^}	—	—
1959	Austin Senators^{†}	3–0	San Antonio Missions
1960	Rio Grande Valley Giants^{^}	—	—
1960	Tulsa Oilers^{†}	3–0	Victoria Rosebuds
1961	Amarillo Gold Sox^{^}	—	—
1961	San Antonio Missions^{†}	3–0	Austin Senators
1962	El Paso Sun Kings^{^}	—	—
1962	Tulsa Oilers^{†}	3–1	Austin Senators
1963	San Antonio Bullets^{^}	—	—
1963	Tulsa Oilers^{†}	3–1	San Antonio Bullets
1964	San Antonio Bullets^{‡}	3–1	Tulsa Oilers
1965	Albuquerque Dodgers	3–1	Tulsa Oilers
1966	Arkansas Travelers^{^}	-	-
1966	Austin Braves^{†}	1–0	Albuquerque Dodgers
1967	Albuquerque Dodgers	—	—
1968	El Paso Sun Kings	3–1	Arkansas Travelers
1969	Memphis Blues	3–0	Amarillo Giants
1970	Albuquerque Dodgers	3–1	Memphis Blues
1971	Arkansas Travelers	2–0	Amarillo Giants
1972	El Paso Sun Dodgers	3–0	Alexandria Aces
1973	Memphis Blues	3–2	San Antonio Brewers
1974	Victoria Toros	3–0	El Paso Diablos
1975^{[d]}	Midland Cubs; Lafayette Drillers	2–2	—
1976	Amarillo Gold Sox	3–0	Shreveport Captains
1977	Arkansas Travelers	2–0	El Paso Diablos
1978	El Paso Diablos	3–0	Jackson Mets
1979	Arkansas Travelers	3–0	San Antonio Dodgers
1980	Arkansas Travelers	3–0	San Antonio Dodgers
1981	Jackson Mets	3–0	San Antonio Dodgers
1982	Tulsa Drillers	3–0	El Paso Diablos
1983	Beaumont Golden Gators	3–0	Jackson Mets
1984	Jackson Mets	4–2	Beaumont Golden Gators
1985	Jackson Mets	4–0	El Paso Diablos
1986	El Paso Diablos	4–0	Jackson Mets
1987	Wichita Pilots	4–2	Jackson Mets
1988	Tulsa Drillers	4–2	El Paso Diablos
1989	Arkansas Travelers	4–3	Wichita Wranglers
1990	Shreveport Captains	4–2	San Antonio Missions
1991	Shreveport Captains	4–2	El Paso Diablos
1992	Wichita Wranglers	4–0	Shreveport Captains
1993	Jackson Generals	3–0	El Paso Diablos
1994	El Paso Diablos	4–0	Jackson Generals
1995	Shreveport Captains	4–1	Midland Angels
1996	Jackson Generals	4–0	Wichita Wranglers
1997	San Antonio Missions	4–3	Shreveport Captains
1998	Tulsa Drillers	4–3	Wichita Wranglers
1999	Wichita Wranglers	4–0	Tulsa Drillers
2000	Round Rock Express	3–1	Wichita Wranglers
2001^{[e]}	Arkansas Travelers	2–0	Round Rock Express
2002	San Antonio Missions	4–3	Tulsa Drillers
2003	San Antonio Missions	4–1	Frisco RoughRiders
2004	Frisco RoughRiders	4–1	Round Rock Express
2005	Midland RockHounds	3–1	Arkansas Travelers
2006	Corpus Christi Hooks	3–1	Wichita Wranglers
2007	San Antonio Missions	3–1	Springfield Cardinals
2008	Arkansas Travelers	3–2	Frisco RoughRiders
2009	Midland RockHounds	3–1	Northwest Arkansas Naturals
2010	Northwest Arkansas Naturals	3–1	Midland RockHounds
2011	San Antonio Missions	3–0	Arkansas Travelers
2012	Springfield Cardinals	3–1	Frisco RoughRiders
2013	San Antonio Missions	3–2	Arkansas Travelers
2014	Midland RockHounds	3–2	Tulsa Drillers
2015	Midland RockHounds	3–0	Northwest Arkansas Naturals
2016	Midland RockHounds	3–1	Northwest Arkansas Naturals
2017	Midland RockHounds	3–2	Tulsa Drillers
2018	Tulsa Drillers	3–0	San Antonio Missions
2019	Amarillo Sod Poodles	3–2	Tulsa Drillers
2020	None (season cancelled due to COVID-19 pandemic)		
2021	Northwest Arkansas Naturals	3–0	Wichita Wind Surge
2022	Frisco RoughRiders	2–0	Wichita Wind Surge
2023	Amarillo Sod Poodles	2–1	Arkansas Travelers
2024	Arkansas Travelers	2–1	Midland RockHounds
2025	Springfield Cardinals	2–1	Midland RockHounds
2026	Amarillo Sod Poodles	2–1	Springfield Cardinals

== Championship wins by team ==
Active Texas League teams appear in bold.

Wins	Team	Championship years
16	Houston Mud Cats/Buffaloes	1889, 1892, 1896, 1909, 1910, 1912, 1913, 1914, 1928, 1931, 1940, 1947, 1951, 1954, 1956, 1957
13	Dallas Hams/Giants/Submarines/Steers/Rebels/Eagles	1888, 1903, 1910, 1917, 1918, 1926, 1929, 1941, 1946, 1952, 1953, 1955, 1957
13	Fort Worth Panthers/Cats	1895, 1905, 1920, 1921, 1922, 1923, 1924, 1925, 1930, 1937, 1939, 1948, 1958
13	**San Antonio Bronchos/Bullets/Missions**	1897, 1908, 1933, 1950, 1961, 1963, 1964, 1997, 2002, 2003, 2007, 2011, 2013
9	**Arkansas Travelers**	1966, 1971, 1977, 1979, 1980, 1989, 2001, 2008, 2024
9	**Tulsa Oilers/Drillers**	1936, 1949, 1960, 1962, 1963, 1982, 1988, 1998, 2018
8	Shreveport Gassers/Sports/Captains	1919, 1942, 1952, 1954, 1955, 1990, 1991, 1995
7	**Midland Cubs/RockHounds**	1975, 2005, 2009, 2014, 2015, 2016, 2017
6	El Paso Sun Kings/Sun Dodgers/Diablos	1962, 1968, 1972, 1978, 1986, 1994
5	Amarillo Gold Sox/**Amarillo Sod Poodles**	1961, 1976, 2019, 2023, 2026
5	Jackson Mets/Generals	1981, 1984, 1985, 1993, 1996
4	Austin Senators/Braves	1907, 1911, 1959, 1966
4	Galveston Sand Crabs/Buccaneers	1890, 1897, 1899, 1934
3	Waco Navigators	1914, 1915, 1916
3	Wichita Pilots/Wranglers	1987, 1992, 1999
3	Albuquerque Dodgers	1965, 1967, 1970
3	Beaumont Exporters/Golden Gators	1932, 1938, 1983
2	Corsicana Oil Citys	1902, 1904
2	Memphis Blues	1969, 1973
2	**Northwest Arkansas Naturals**	2010, 2021
2	**Corpus Christi Giants/Hooks**	1958, 2006
2	**Frisco RoughRiders**	2004, 2022
2	**Springfield Cardinals**	2012, 2025
2	Victoria Rosebuds/Toros	1959, 1974
1	Cleburne Railroaders	1906
1	Lafayette Drillers	1975
1	Oklahoma City Indians	1935
1	Rio Grande Valley Giants	1960
1	Round Rock Express	2000
1	Wichita Falls Spudders	1927

== Notes ==
- ^{a} Galveston and San Antonio were declared co-champions.
- ^{b} Dallas and Houston were declared co-champions.
- ^{c} Waco and Houston were declared co-champions.
- ^{d} Midland and Lafayette were declared co-champions.
- ^{e} Arkansas was declared champion after playoffs were cancelled in the wake the September 11, 2001 terrorist attacks, which caused a stoppage in professional baseball.
