= Frisco RoughRiders =

- Founded in 2003; Frisco, Texas
Team logo
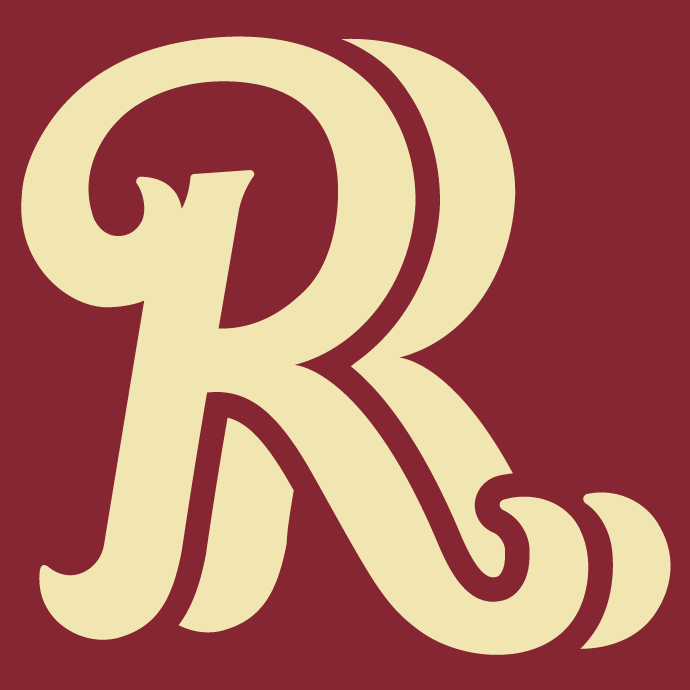
Cap insignia

Minor league affiliations
- Class: Double-A (2003–present)
- League: Texas League (2003–present)
- Division: South Division

Major league affiliations
- Team: Texas Rangers (2003–present)

Minor league titles
- League titles (2): 2004; 2022
- Division titles (6): 2003; 2004; 2008; 2012; 2021; 2022
- First-half titles (8): 2003; 2007; 2008; 2010; 2012; 2014; 2024; 2026
- Second-half titles (4): 2004; 2008; 2014; 2022
- Wild card berths (1): 2011

Team data
- Name: Frisco RoughRiders (2003–present)
- Colors: Scorched red, slate blue, Texas navy, cream
- Ballpark: Riders Field (2003–present)
- Owner/ Operator: Greenberg Sports Group
- General manager: Scott Burchett
- Manager: Chad Comer
- Website: milb.com/frisco

The Frisco RoughRiders (often shortened to 'Riders) are a Minor League Baseball team of the Texas League and the Double-A affiliate of the Texas Rangers. Based in Frisco, Texas, the team is named after the 1st U.S. Volunteer Cavalry Regiment during the Spanish–American War, headed by future American President Theodore Roosevelt, nicknamed "The Rough Riders" by the American press. They play their home games at Riders Field, which opened in 2003 and seats 10,316 people.

The RoughRiders have served as an affiliate of the Rangers since their establishment in 2003 as members of the Texas League. They moved to the Double-A Central in 2021, but this was renamed the Texas League in 2022. Frisco has reached the postseason on seven occasions. They have won five division titles and two league championships. Their first Texas League title was won in 2004, and the RoughRiders secured their second title in 2022.

== History ==
In 2001, the Texas League's Shreveport SwampDragons (previously the Shreveport Captains) of Shreveport, Louisiana, were purchased by Mandalay Entertainment in connection with Tom Hicks, former owner of the Texas Rangers and the Southwest Sports Group. Mandalay Baseball moved them to the North Texas city of Frisco and changed their name to the RoughRiders. The team would play at Dr Pepper Ballpark, a newly constructed stadium, and be the Double-A affiliate of the Texas Rangers.

The RoughRiders played their first home game on April 3, 2003. The game was a sellout with over 10,000 fans in attendance. They qualified for the Texas League playoffs in their inaugural season by winning the first-half title with a record of 40–30. They advanced past the Wichita Wranglers before being defeated by the San Antonio Missions, four games to one, in the finals. Frisco saw 675,620 fans come through the turnstiles at Dr Pepper Ballpark, which ranked fourth overall in all of minor league attendance.

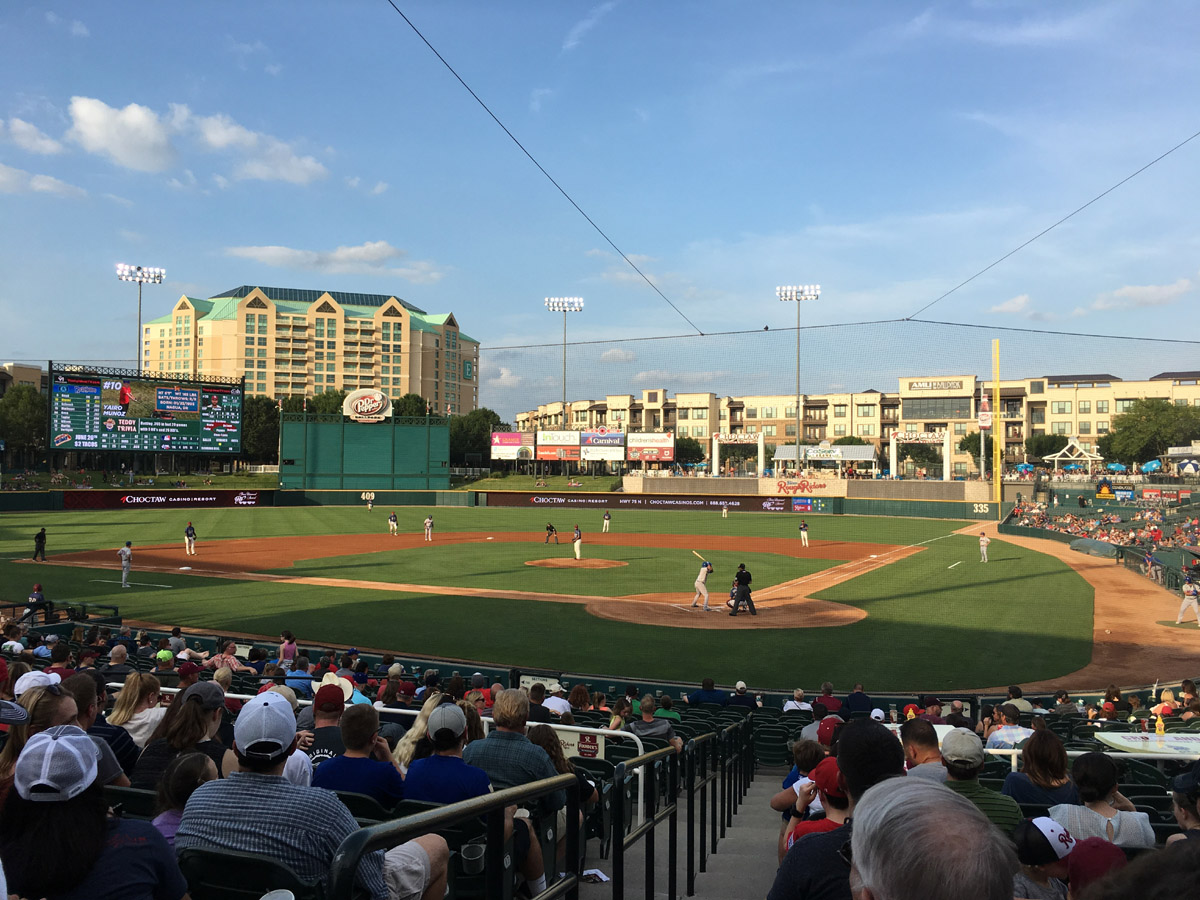
Frisco playing against the Midland RockHounds in June 2017

The 'Riders finished off a remarkable second-half run and clinched the 2004 second-half Eastern Division title at home with a 45–25 record. They defeated the Tulsa Drillers to win the Eastern Division title and moved on to face the Round Rock Express, winners of the Western Division in the championship series. Frisco beat the Express, four games to one, and captured its first Texas League championship in just its second year of existence.

Frisco hosted the 2005 Texas League All-Star Game in which Andre Ethier lead the East All-Stars over the West, 5–0, with a key RBI-single. On July 28, 2005, A. J. Murray, Steve Karsay, and Scott Feldman combined to pitch a perfect game for the RoughRiders against the Corpus Christi Hooks in Corpus Christi. The final score was 3–0. They finished the season with a 58–82 record.

Pitchers Thomas Diamond and John Danks, infielder Adam Morissey, and outfielder Anthony Webster were selected for the 2006 Texas League All-Star Game. The 'Riders finished the season in third place with a 72–68 record.

Frisco returned to postseason play in 2007 by virtue of winning the first-half title, 47–23, but were defeated in the first round by San Antonio, three games to none. Their final 2007 season record was 85–55, the best ever in RoughRiders' history. First-year Manager Dave Anderson was named Texas League Manager of the Year, the first such honor for a Frisco manager. Baseball America selected Frisco as the 2007 Bob Freitas Award winner for the top Double-A franchise.

The RoughRiders defeated the Texas Rangers in a preseason exhibition game on March 29, 2008. On May 18, Matt Harrison tossed a 2–0 7-inning no-hitter against the San Antonio Missions at Dr. Pepper Ballpark. The team once again captured the first-half division title, 43–27, but also won the second-half title, 41–29, with an overall record of 84–56. They swept San Antonio to win the South Division, but fell to the Arkansas Travelers, 3–2, in the championship finals. Frisco manager Scott Little won the league's Manager of the Year Award.

Frisco hosted the 2009 Texas League All-Star Game in which five of its players were selected to compete: pitchers Jumbo Díaz and Kasey Kiker, catcher Manny Piña, outfielder Craig Gentry, and first baseman Justin Smoak. The 'Riders lost the final game of the season to the Midland RockHounds, thus eliminating them from postseason contention.

Former Rangers third baseman Steve Buechele led Frisco to clinch the 2010 first-half South Division title, 38–31, behind Tanner Roark who earned the win pitching 5.1 innings as the RoughRiders topped the Corpus Christi Hooks, 7–3, at Whataburger Field. The RoughRiders lost the best-of-five divisional round to the Midland RockHounds, three games to one. Blake Beavan won the Texas League Pitcher of the Year Award after posting a 10–5 record and a 2.78 ERA over 17 starts.

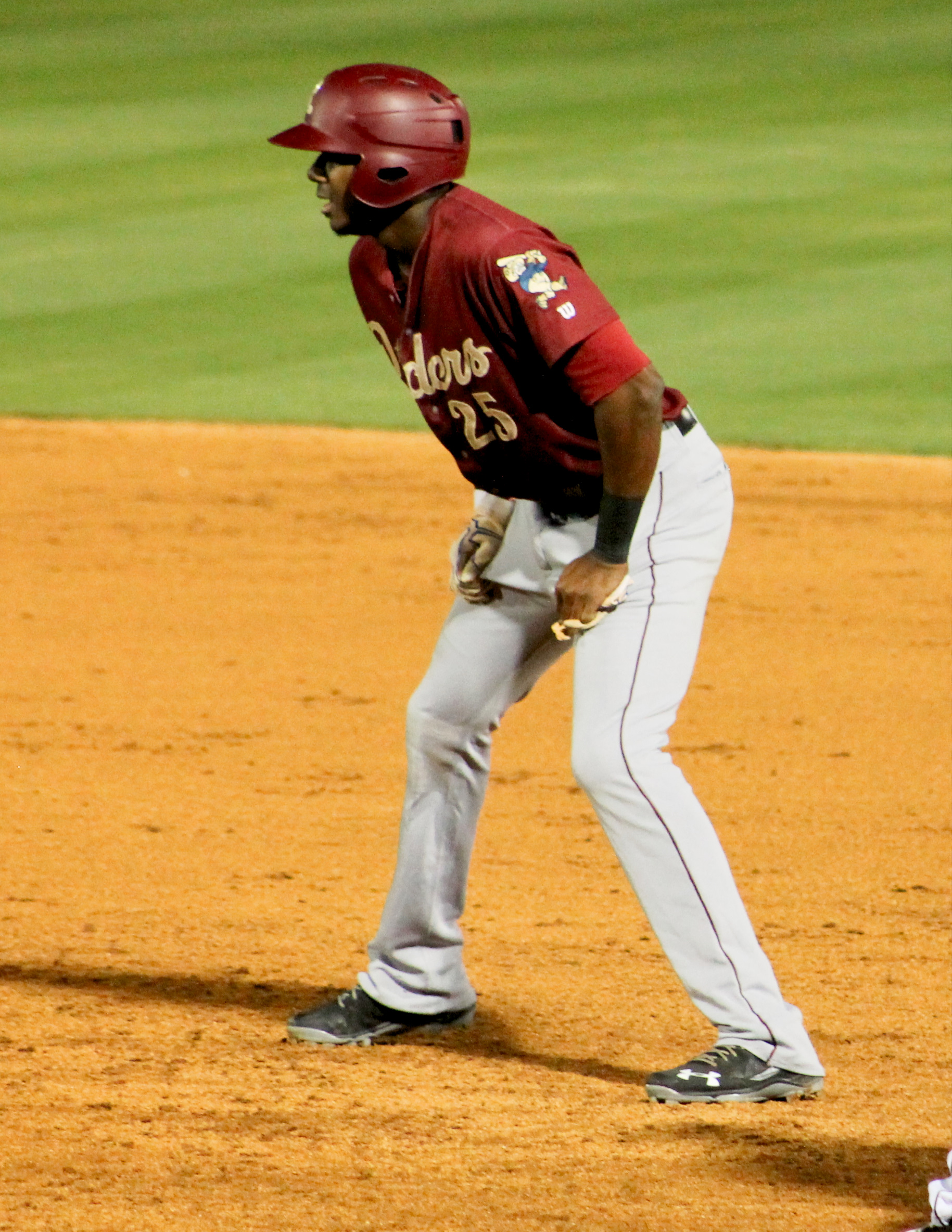
Lewis Brinson played outfield for the RoughRiders in 2016.

Cuban defector Leonys Martín signed a five-year major-league contract with the Rangers worth $15.5 million and was assigned to Frisco to begin the 2012 season. Martín and eight other players (Mike Bianucci, José Félix, José Ruiz, Tommy Mendonca, Renny Osuna, Adalberto Flores, Justin Miller, and Martín Pérez were named Texas League All-stars that year. Though Frisco qualified for the postseason, they lost the best-of-five division series to San Antonio, three games to one. The 'Riders ended the regular season with 79 wins and 61 losses.

Making his first pitching performance in the Metroplex since signing with Texas for $60 million (after the Rangers paid a $51.7 million posting fee to the Hokkaido Nippon Ham Fighters), Yu Darvish struck out top Frisco prospect Jurickson Profar to begin four scoreless innings in a 6–1 exhibition win over the RoughRiders at Dr Pepper Ballpark on April 4, 2012. On May 18, the youngest player in all of Double-A baseball, shortstop Jurickson Profar extended his hit streak to 29 games in a 13–0 victory over San Antonio. The 19-year-old's streak ended the next night, but he kept his on-base streak going until it reached 50 straight games (the longest such streak in Minor League Baseball for 2012) on June 2. Power hitting prospect Mike Olt finished his biggest homer binge of the season, hitting two home runs in a June 3 game for the third-straight game. Olt went on to lead the Texas League in home runs with 28 despite getting called up to the big leagues in early August. Nine RoughRiders were named to the Texas League All-Star team. After winning the first half, 41–29, Frisco won the South Division title against Corpus Christi, 3–0, to advance to the league championship, but lost the league crown to the Springfield Cardinals, 3–1. The 2013 team finished with an even 70–70 record, but failed to win either half of the season.

On June 16, 2014, Mandalay Baseball Properties LLC, who owned the Frisco RoughRiders, entered into a definitive agreement with the CEO and Managing Partner of the Myrtle Beach Pelicans, Chuck Greenberg, as well as RoughRiders President Scott Sonju, for the sale of the Frisco RoughRiders franchise. Greenberg became Chairman, CEO, as well as the Managing Partner of the newly formed Frisco RoughRiders LP, which is a partnership of local investors who acquired the RoughRiders. Sonju is a Co-Managing Partner and continued to serve as RoughRiders' president to oversee the day-to-day operations of the team under Greenberg's leadership. The team qualified for the 2014 postseason by winning both halves (40–29 and 40–30), but lost the South Division title to Midland, three games to one. Losing seasons from 2015 to 2019, including back-to-back last-place finishes in 2017 and 2018, have kept the RoughRiders out of the postseason recently.

In conjunction with Major League Baseball's restructuring of Minor League Baseball in 2021, the RoughRiders were organized into the Double-A Central. They won the 2021 Southern Division title with a first-place 64–55 record. Despite winning the division, their record was third-best in the league, and only the two teams with the highest winning percentages in the regular season competed for the league championship. Cole Winn won the league's Pitcher of the Year Award. In 2022, the Double-A Central became known as the Texas League, the name historically used by the regional circuit prior to the 2021 reorganization.

== Season-by-season results ==
Season	Regular season					Postseason			Ref.
Season	Record	Win %	League	Division	GB	Record	Win %	Result	Ref.
2003	73–67	.521	3rd	2nd	2	4–4	.500	Result	Won First Half East Division title Won East Division title vs. Wichita Wranglers, 3–0; Lost TL championship vs. San Antonio Missions, 4–1
2004	81–59–2	.579	2nd	1st	—	7–1	.875	Won Second Half East Division title Won East Division title vs. Tulsa Drillers, 3–0; Won TL championship vs. Round Rock Express, 4–1	
2005	58–82	.414	8th	4th	20	—	—	—	
2006	72–68	.514	5th	3rd	6 1/2	—	—	—	
2007	85–55	.607	1st	1st	—	0–3	.000	Won First Half South Division title Lost South Division title vs. San Antonio Missions, 3–0	
2008	84–56	.600	1st	1st	—	5–3	.625	Won First and Second Half South Division titles Won South Division title vs. San Antonio Missions, 3–0; Lost TL championship vs. Arkansas Travelers, 3–2	
2009	72–68	.514	4th	2nd	6	—	—	—	
2010	72–67	.518	3rd	1st	—	1–3	.250	Won First Half South Division title Lost South Division title vs. Midland RockHounds, 3–1	
2011	79–61	.564	2nd	2nd	15	1–3	.250	Lost South Division title vs. San Antonio Missions, 3–1	
2012	80–60	.571	2nd	2nd	1	4–3	.571	Won First Half South Division title Won South Division title vs. Corpus Christi Hooks, 3–0; Lost TL championship vs. Springfield Cardinals, 3–1	
2013	70–70	.500	4th	3rd	13	—	—	—	
2014	80–59	.576	1st	1st	—	1–3	.250	Won First and Second Half South Division titles Lost South Division title vs. Midland RockHounds, 3–1	
2015	60–79	.432	7th	3rd	28 1/2	—	—	—	
2016	63–76	.453	7th	3rd	21 1/2	—	—	—	
2017	60–80	.429	8th	4th	18	—	—	—	
2018	60–80	.429	8th	4th	23	—	—	—	
2019	68–71	.475	5th	3rd	7	—	—	—	
2020	Season cancelled (COVID-19 pandemic)								
2021	64–55	.538	3rd	1st	7	—	—	Won Southern Division title	
2022	74–63	.475	2nd	1st	—	4-0	1.000	Won Second-Half South Division title Won South Division title vs. San Antonio Missions, 2–0; Won TL championship vs. Wichita Wind Surge, 2–0	
2023	64–73	.467	9th	5th	12 1/2	—	—	—	
2024	84–54	.609	1st (tie)	1st (tie)	—	1–2	.333	Won First Half South Division title Lost South Division title vs. Midland RockHounds, 2–1	
2025	73-63	.537	3rd	1st	14	—	—	—	
Totals	1,503–1,403	.517	—	—	—	28–25	.528	2 league title, 6 division titles, 11 half division titles	—

== Mascots ==
The RoughRiders have four mascots: Deuce, Daisy, Ted E Bear, and Bull Moose. Ted E Bear is an anthropomorphic teddy bear resembling Teddy Roosevelt in military uniform.

== Roster ==
Frisco RoughRiders roster
Players	Coaches/Other
Pitchers: 22 Ben Anderson; 14 Wilian Bormie; 52 Jonathan Brand; 46 Zach Bryant ~; 43 Aidan Curry; 49 Joey Danielson; 57 Thomas Ireland; 30 Janser Lara; 67 Eric Loomis; 17 Leandro López *; 28 Dylan MacLean; 40 Bryan Magdaleno; 33 D.J. McCarty ~; 45 Jordan Montgomery * #; 20 Brock Porter; 27 Austin Roberts; 61 Cole Stasio; 54 Blake Townsend; 23 Josh Trentadue; Catchers: 24 Ian Moller; 16 Malcolm Moore; 25 Juan Sulbaran ~; Infielders: 2 Frainyer Chavez; 15 Arturo Disla; 4 Luke Hanson; 18 Corey Joyce; 38 Rafe Perich; 12 Max Wagner; 1 Sebastian Walcott; Outfielders: 6 Evan Carter * #; 8 Dylan Dreiling; 11 Keith Jones II; 5 Marcus Lee Sang; 6 Yeison Morrobel	Manager: 21 Chad Comer; Coaches: 48 Jason Hart (hitting); 31 Jorge Hernandez (development); 47 Thomas St. Clair (pitching); 9 Jay Sullenger (development); 60-day injured list: -- Larson Kindreich (full season); -- Tucker Mitchell (full season); 7-day injured list; * On Texas Rangers 40-man roster; ~ Development list; # Rehab assignment; ∞ Reserve list; ‡ Restricted list; § Suspended list; † Temporarily inactive list; Roster updated August 25, 2026; Transactions; → More rosters: MiLB • Texas League; → Texas Rangers minor league players

== Awards ==
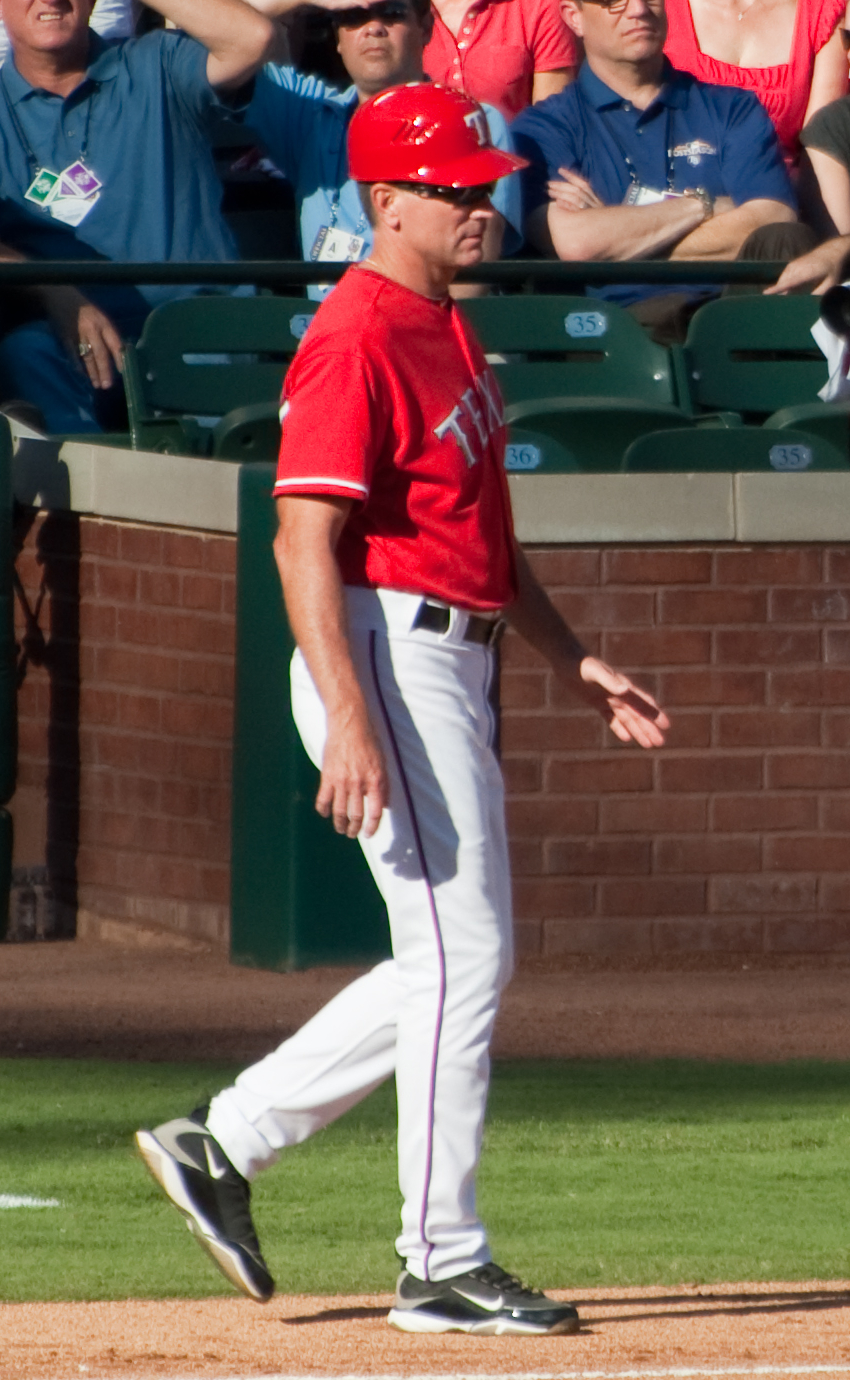
Dave Anderson won the Texas League Manager of the Year Award in 2007.

Three players have won league awards in recognition for their performance with the RoughRiders. Six members of the coaching staff and two executives have also been honored.

Texas League awards
Award	Recipient	Season	Ref.
Pitcher of the Year	Blake Beavan	2010	
Pitcher of the Year	Barret Loux	2012	
Pitcher of the Year	Cole Winn	2021	
Manager of the Year	Dave Anderson	2007	
Manager of the Year	Scott Little	2008	
Manager of the Year	Jason Wood	2014	
Coach of the Year	Scott Coolbaugh	2007	
Coach of the Year	Jeff Andrews	2014	
Coach of the Year	Jason Hart	2016	
Executive of the Year	Scott Sonju	2014	
Executive of the Year	Scott Burchett	2017	

== Notable alumni ==
The following is a partial list of players who have appeared in games for the RoughRiders (not including any rehab assignments) before being promoted to the major leagues.

- Elvis Andrus, shortstop
- Joaquín Arias, infielder
- Blake Beavan, relief pitcher
- Richard Bleier, relief pitcher
- Jason Botts, infielder
- Lewis Brinson, outfielder
- John Danks, starting pitcher
- Chris Davis, first baseman
- Scott Feldman, starting pitcher
- Neftalí Feliz, starting pitcher/relief pitcher
- Wilmer Font, relief pitcher
- Joey Gallo, outfielder/infielder
- Craig Gentry, outfielder
- Adrián González, first baseman
- Ronald Guzmán, first baseman
- Odúbel Herrera, second baseman
- Derek Holland, starting pitcher
- Tommy Hunter, relief pitcher
- Keone Kela, relief pitcher
- Isiah Kiner-Falefa, catcher/infielder
- Ian Kinsler, second baseman
- José Leclerc, relief pitcher
- Kameron Loe, starting pitcher
- Leonys Martín, outfielder
- Nomar Mazara, outfielder
- Marshall McDougall, infielder
- Chris McGuiness, infielder
- Drew Meyer, infielder
- Mitch Moreland, first baseman/outfielder
- Ramón Nivar, outfielder
- Laynce Nix, outfielder
- Rougned Odor, second baseman
- Alexi Ogando, starting pitcher/relief pitcher
- Mike Olt, first baseman/third baseman
- Martín Pérez, starting pitcher
- Jurickson Profar, second baseman/shortstop
- Tanner Roark, starting pitcher
- Josh Rupe, starting pitcher
- Tanner Scheppers, relief pitcher
- Justin Smoak, infielder
- Mark Teixeira, firstbaseman
- Edinson Vólquez, starting pitcher
- C. J. Wilson, starting pitcher
- Chris Young, starting pitcher
