= Steve Smith (infielder) =

American baseball coach (born 1952)

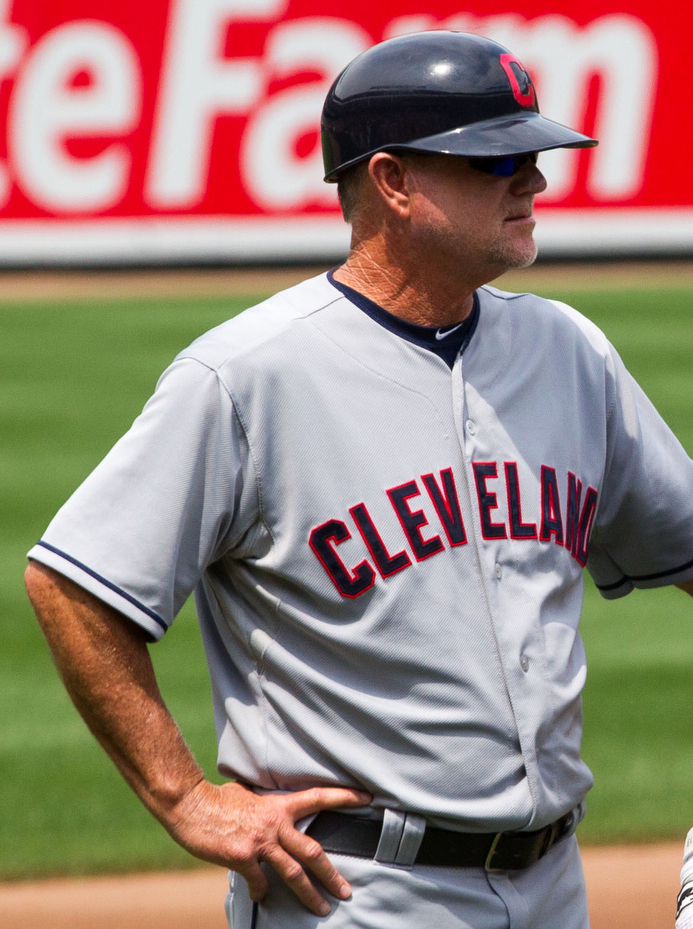
- Smith in 2012
- Infielder / coach
- Born: July 21, 1952 (age 74); Canton, Ohio, U.S.
- Bats: Right Throws: Right

Teams
- As coach: Seattle Mariners (1996–1999); Texas Rangers (2002–2006); Philadelphia Phillies (2007–2008); Cleveland Indians (2010–2013); Cincinnati Reds (2014)

Career highlights and awards
- World Series champion (2008)

Steven John Smith (born July 21, 1952) is an American former professional baseball player and coach. He recently served as the third base coach for the Cincinnati Reds of Major League Baseball (MLB). Smith has also held the same position with the Seattle Mariners, Texas Rangers, Philadelphia Phillies, and Cleveland Indians. He has also been a minor league manager in the San Diego Padres, Texas Rangers, Seattle Mariners, and Milwaukee Brewers organizations.

== Baseball career ==
=== Playing career ===
As a player, Smith was primarily a second baseman and shortstop, though he played a few games at third base and even made one appearance as a pitcher. Smith played in the San Diego Padres organization from 1976 to 1982, playing for the Single-A Walla Walla Padres and Reno Silver Sox, the Double-A Amarillo Gold Sox, and the Triple-A Hawaii Islanders. He played over three seasons at Triple-A Hawaii, but was never called up by the major league club. Smith's playing career ended after the 1982 season.

=== Coaching career ===
From 1983 to 1989, Smith managed the Single-A Salem Redbirds, Miami Marlins, and Reno Padres, the Double-A Beaumont Golden Gators and Wichita Pilots, and the Triple-A Las Vegas Stars, all of which were Padres affiliates at the time he managed them. He then spent the 1990 season managing the Double-A Oklahoma City 89ers in the Texas Rangers organization. Smith then went to the Seattle Mariners organization, managing the Single-A Advanced Peninsula Pilots in 1991, the Triple-A Calgary Cannons in 1994, and the Triple-A Tacoma Rainiers in 1995.

Smith became a major league coach for the Mariners in 1996 and held a coaching position with the club until 1999. He then returned to the minor leagues in 2000, managing the Triple-A Indianapolis Indians of the Milwaukee Brewers organization. Smith returned to major league coaching in 2002 when he became the third-base coach for the Texas Rangers, a position he held until 2006. In 2007, Smith became the Philadelphia Phillies third-base coach, and won a World Series ring with the team in 2008. However, the Phillies dismissed him after the 2008 season.

Smith was named as the infield and third base coach with the Cleveland Indians on November 16, 2009, and remained with the team until after the 2012 season. He served as the Cincinnati Reds third base coach during the 2014 season, but was not retained by the Reds following the season.

== Personal life and other media ==
Smith lives in Encinitas, California. He and his daughter, Allison, competed on the sixteenth season of the CBS reality program The Amazing Race. They finished in sixth place and were eliminated on the April 4, 2010, episode in Malaysia.
