= Memphis Blues (minor league) =

- 1968–1976; Memphis, Tennessee

Minor league affiliations
- Class: Triple-A (1974–1976); Double-A (1968–1973)
- League: International League (1974–1976); Texas League (1968–1973)

Major league affiliations
- Team: Houston Astros (1976); Montreal Expos (1974–1975); New York Mets (1968–1973)

Minor league titles
- League titles (2): 1969; 1973
- Division titles (4): 1969; 1970; 1973; 1974

Team data
- Name: Memphis Blues (1968–1976)
- Colors: Blue, orange, white
- Ballpark: Blues Stadium (1968–1976)

The Memphis Blues were a Minor League Baseball team that played in Memphis, Tennessee, from 1968 to 1976. They competed in the Double-A Texas League from 1968 to 1973 as an affiliate of the New York Mets. Memphis transferred to the Triple-A International League in 1974, where they were affiliated with the Montreal Expos from 1974 to 1975 and Houston Astros in 1976. Their home games were played at Blues Stadium

Over the course of their nine-year run, Memphis played in 1,239 regular season games and compiled a win–loss record of 644–595. The Blues reached the postseason on five occasions, winning four division titles, and two Texas League championships. They won their league titles in 1969 and 1973 as affiliates of the New York Mets. The team had an overall postseason record of 9–12.

== History ==
=== Prior professional baseball in Memphis ===
The first professional baseball team in Memphis was the Memphis Reds of the League Alliance in 1877. A different Reds team was created as a charter member of the original Southern League in 1885. The city's Southern League team was known as the Grays in 1886 and 1888, the Browns in 1887, simply Memphis in 1889, the Giants in 1892 and 1894, the Fever Germs in 1893, and the Lambs/Giants in 1895.

The city's longest-operating baseball team, first known as Memphis Egyptians, was formed in 1901 as a charter member of the Southern Association. From 1909 to 1911, this club was called the Turtles before receiving its best-known moniker, the Chickasaws, often shortened to Chicks, in 1912. The original Chicks remained in the league through 1960, winning eight pennants, one playoff championship, and one Dixie Series title. Russwood Park, their home ballpark, was destroyed by fire in April 1960. With the cost of building a new facility too high, the team dropped out of the league after the 1960 season.

=== Texas League (1968–1973) ===
After a seven-year span with no professional team, the city became host to the Memphis Blues, a Double-A club of the Texas League, in 1968. The team played at Blues Stadium, a converted American Legion field which opened in 1963 and was located at the former Mid-South Fairgrounds. They were affiliated with the New York Mets. On April 16, the Blues won their inaugural season opener against the Arkansas Travelers, 10–2. On July 21, Steve Renko pitched a seven-inning no-hitter against the Albuquerque Dodgers in the second game of a doubleheader in Memphis. The Blues finished the season with a 67–69 record, placing third in the Eastern Division and missing the championship playoffs for which only division winners qualified.

On April 20, 1969, Les Rohr pitched an 8–0 no-hitter against the San Antonio Missions in the second game of a seven-inning doubleheader at Blues Stadium. The 1969 Blues improved over their previous record, ending their sophomore season with a 66–65 record and winning the Eastern Division title. In the best-of-five finals, Memphis defeated the Amarillo Giants, 3–0, to win the 1969 Texas League championship. Manager Roy McMillan won the Texas League Manager of the Year Award. Memphis repeated as the Eastern Division champions in 1970 with a first-place 69–67 record, but they lost the finals to Albuquerque, 3–1.

In 1971, the Texas League joined forces with the Southern League to form the Dixie Association. Under the interleague partnership, the two leagues played an interlocking schedule with individual league champions determined at the end of the season, but Memphis missed the playoffs with a second-place finish in its Central Division. On June 25, Tommy Moore no-hit Arkansas, 4–0, on the road in the second seven-inning game of a doubleheader. A second-place finish in 1972 again kept the Blues from the postseason.

Memphis won the Eastern Division in 1973 with a 77–61 record. The Blues then won a second Texas League championship by defeating the San Antonio Brewers, 3–2, in the finals. Through six seasons in the Texas League as a Mets affiliate, Memphis accumulated a record of 423–396.

=== International League (1974–1976) ===
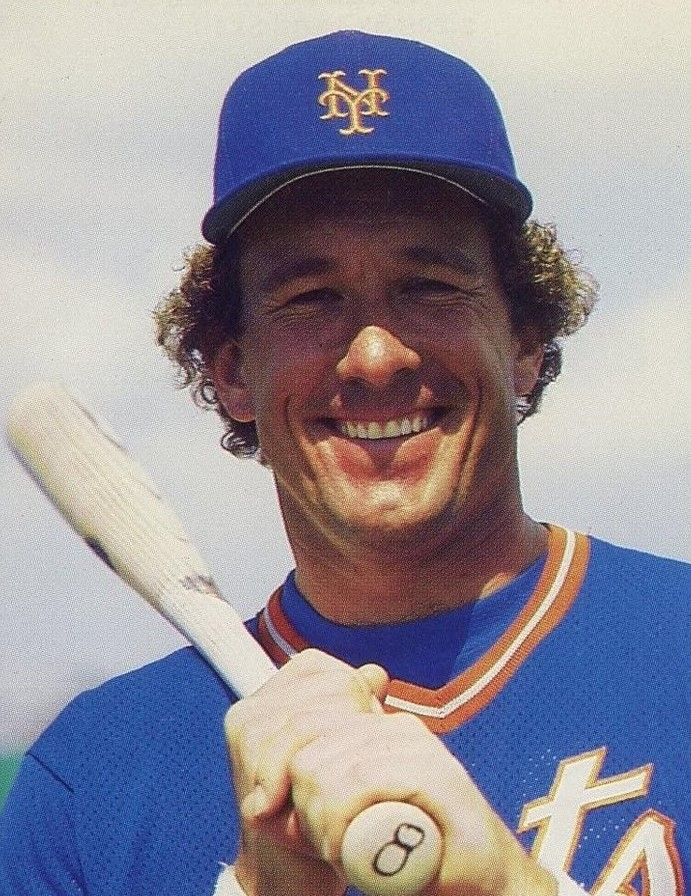
Gary Carter led the 1974 Blues with 23 home runs and 83 runs batted in. He was inducted into the Baseball Hall of Fame in 2003.

The Blues were replaced by a Triple-A International League (IL) team in 1974. The Triple-A Blues carried on the history of the Double-A team preceding it.

Owner Bernard Kraus sold the Double-A Texas League team for US$25,000 to businessman Cal Rockefeller, who moved the team to Victoria, Texas, where they became the Victoria Toros.

Affiliated with the Montreal Expos, Memphis finished its first season in the International League with an 87–55 record, winning the Southern Division title. They were eliminated, however, in the semifinals by the Rochester Red Wings, 4–2. Manager Karl Kuehl was selected for the IL Manager of the Year Award. The Blues missed the playoffs with a sub-.500 record in 1975. After two seasons with the Expos, the Blues' record was 152–130. Their all-time eight-year record stood at 575–526.

Memphis became the Triple-A affiliate of the Houston Astros in 1976. They qualified for the postseason with a top-four finish at an even 69–69, but they were swept out of the semifinals with a 3–0 series loss to the Syracuse Chiefs. Their final game was a 5–4 loss in Memphis. After nine seasons, the Blues' all-time record was 644–595.

The International League revoked Memphis' franchise at a November 8, 1976, meeting of the league's directors because the owner was unable to pay $22,000 owed for league dues plus lodging and transportation bills due to different cities in the league. An audit revealed the team to be nearly $340,000 in debt. The franchise was switched to Charleston, West Virginia, in 1977 as the Charleston Charlies. Memphis businessman Avron Fogelman attempted to acquire a Texas League franchise to replace the Blues, but was unsuccessful. He later secured an expansion team in the Double-A Southern League, which began play in 1978 as the Memphis Chicks.

== Season-by-season results ==
Table key
League	The team's final position in the league standings
Division	The team's final position in the divisional standings
GB	Games behind the team that finished in first place in the division that season
‡	League champions
†	Division champions
*	Postseason berth

Season-by-season results
Season	League	Division	Regular season					Postseason			Manager(s)	MLB affiliate	Ref.
Season	League	Division	Record	Win %	League	Division	GB	Record	Win %	Result	Manager(s)	MLB affiliate	Ref.
1968	TL	Eastern	67–69	.493	5th	3rd	13	—	—	Result	—	Roy Sievers	New York Mets
1969 ‡ †	TL	Eastern	66–65	.504	4th	1st	—	3–0	1.000	Won Eastern Division title Won TL championship vs. Amarillo Giants, 3–0	Pete Pavlick; John Antonelli; Roy McMillan	New York Mets	
1970 †	TL	Eastern	69–67	.507	3rd	1st	—	1–3	.250	Won Eastern Division title Lost TL championship vs. Albuquerque Dodgers, 3–1	John Antonelli	New York Mets	
1971	DA	Central	69–70	.496	4th	2nd	6	—	—	—	John Antonelli	New York Mets	
1972	TL	Eastern	75–64	.540	3rd	2nd	8 1/2	—	—	—	John Antonelli	New York Mets	
1973 ‡ †	TL	Eastern	77–61	.558	2nd	1st	—	3–2	.600	Won Eastern Division title Won TL championship vs. San Antonio Brewers, 3–2	Joe Frazier	New York Mets	
1974 †	IL	Southern	87–55	.613	1st	1st	—	2–4	.333	Won Southern Division title Lost semifinals vs. Rochester Red Wings, 4–2	Karl Kuehl	Montreal Expos	
1975	IL	—	65–75	.464	5th	—	20 1/2	—	—	—	Karl Kuehl	Montreal Expos	
1976 *	IL	—	69–69	.500	3rd	—	19	0–3	.000	Lost semifinals vs. Syracuse Chiefs, 3–0	Jim Beauchamp	Houston Astros	
Totals	—	644–595	.520	—	—	—	9–12	.429	—	—	—	—	—

Franchise totals by affiliation
Affiliation	Regular season		Postseason		
Affiliation	Record	Win %	Appearances	Record	Win %
New York Mets (1968–1973)	423–396	.516	3	7–5	.583
Montreal Expos (1974–1975)	152–130	.539	1	2–4	.333
Houston Astros (1976)	69–69	.500	1	0–3	.000
Totals	644–595	.520	5	9–12	.429

Franchise totals by classification/league
Classification/league	Regular season		Postseason		
Classification/league	Record	Win %	Appearances	Record	Win %
Double-A Texas League (1968–1973)	423–396	.516	3	7–5	.583
Triple-A International League (1974–1976)	221–199	.526	2	2–7	.222
Totals	644–595	.520	5	9–12	.429
