= Round Rock Express =

- Founded in 2000; Round Rock, Texas
Team logo
Cap insignia

Minor league affiliations
- Class: Triple-A (2005–present)
- Previous classes: Double-A (2000–2004)
- League: Pacific Coast League (2005–present)
- Division: East Division
- Previous leagues: Texas League (2000–2004)

Major league affiliations
- Team: Texas Rangers (2021–present)
- Previous teams: Houston Astros (2019–2020); Texas Rangers (2011–2018); Houston Astros (2000–2010)

Minor league titles
- League titles (1): 2000
- Conference titles (3): 2006; 2015; 2019
- Division titles (7): 2000; 2001; 2004; 2006; 2011; 2015; 2019
- First-half titles (4): 2000; 2001; 2002; 2004
- Second-half titles (2): 2004; 2023

Team data
- Name: Round Rock Express (2000–present)
- Colors: Navy blue, red, silver, white
- Mascot: Spike
- Ballpark: Dell Diamond (2000–present)
- Owner/ Operator: Ryan Sanders Baseball
- President: Chris Almendarez
- General manager: Tim Jackson
- Manager: Kyle Moore
- Website: milb.com/round-rock

The Round Rock Express are a Minor League Baseball team of the Pacific Coast League (PCL) and the Triple-A affiliate of the Texas Rangers. They are located in Round Rock, Texas, and play their home games at the Dell Diamond. The team is named for Baseball Hall of Famer and Texas native Nolan Ryan, who was nicknamed "The Ryan Express." Ryan, along with son Reid Ryan and Don Sanders make up the team's ownership group, Ryan Sanders Baseball.

The Express were established as a Double-A team of the Texas League (TL) in 2000. They won the Texas League championship in 2000. Round Rock was replaced by a Triple-A Pacific Coast League team in 2005. The Triple-A Express carried on the history of the Double-A team that preceded them. With Major League Baseball's restructuring of Minor League Baseball in 2021, the Express were shifted to the Triple-A West, which was renamed the PCL in 2022.

== History ==
The ownership group led by Nolan Ryan and Don Sanders began its operations in Round Rock in 2000 as the Dell Diamond opened, moving the Double-A Texas League's Jackson Generals to the new park, affiliating with the Houston Astros and setting attendance records for the Double-A level. By 2003, Corpus Christi had offered the Ryan-Sanders group $20 million to build a stadium and move a professional franchise there, and the ownership group was convinced Round Rock could support Triple-A baseball.

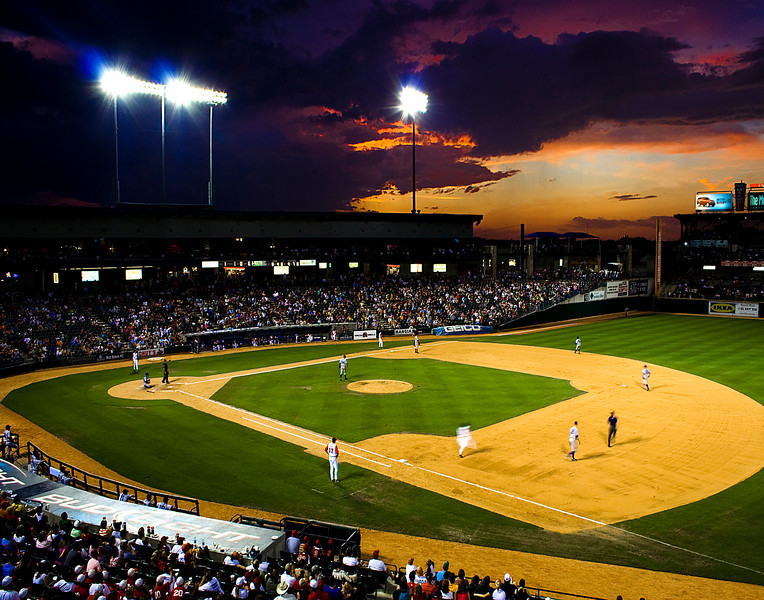
An Express game at the Dell Diamond at night

Meanwhile, the Pacific Coast League's Edmonton Trappers franchise, left isolated by the departure of the Calgary Cannons after the 2002 season for Albuquerque, was under pressure from the rest of the league to relocate to the United States. After the 2003 season, the Ryan group purchased the Trappers franchise with plans to relocate that franchise to Round Rock for 2005, once the Corpus Christi stadium would be ready for the Double-A franchise. The Triple-A club would carry on the Round Rock Express identity; the Double-A club would become the Corpus Christi Hooks, and the Ryan group was able to negotiate an affiliation swap with the New Orleans Zephyrs to obtain the Astros' Triple-A affiliation for the newly-arriving PCL club.

In 2006, the Round Rock Express clinched the Southern Division of the league's American Conference with a win–loss record of 85–59. After defeating the Nashville Sounds in five games to take the American Conference championship, they advanced to the PCL championship series, but lost to the Tucson Sidewinders in three straight games.

In 2011, after 6 seasons of serving as the Triple-A affiliate of the Houston Astros, and 11 seasons of being affiliated with the Astros overall, the Express became the Triple-A affiliate of the Texas Rangers. Through the end of the 2018 season, attendance figures have dropped 8% since changing affiliations from Houston to Texas (see table below). Each of the top 9 season attendances all occurred in the 11 seasons the team was affiliated with Houston.

In 2016, Forbes listed the Express as the sixth-most valuable Minor League Baseball team with a value of $40 million.

On September 20, 2018, the Express announced a 4-year Player Development Contract with the Houston Astros. In conjunction with Major League Baseball's reorganization of the minors after the 2020 season, the Astros opted to discontinue their affiliation with Round Rock, leaving them in need of a new major league affiliate.

The Express later re-affiliated with the Texas Rangers for 2021 and were organized into the Triple-A West. Round Rock ended the season tied for second place in the Eastern Division with a 61–58 record. No playoffs were held to determine a league champion; instead, the team with the best regular-season record was declared the winner. However, 10 games that had been postponed from the start of the season were reinserted into the schedule as a postseason tournament called the Triple-A Final Stretch in which all 30 Triple-A clubs competed for the highest winning percentage. Round Rock finished the tournament tied for seventh place with a 6–4 record. In 2022, the Triple-A West became known as the Pacific Coast League, the name historically used by the regional circuit prior to the 2021 reorganization.

Playing under a split-season format in 2023 in which the teams with the best league-wide records at the end of each half qualified for the playoffs, Round Rock won the second-half title at 45–30. Overall, the team posted the league's second-best record, 89–60. In a single round of playoffs to determine the PCL championship versus the Oklahoma City Dodgers, winners of the first half, the Express were defeated, two games to none.

== Season-by-season records ==
Key
League	The team's final position in the league standings
Division	The team's final position in the divisional standings
GB	Games behind the team that finished in first place in the division that season
‡	Class champions (2005–present)
†	League champions (2000–present)
§	Conference champions (2005–2020)
*	Division champions (2000–2022)
^	Postseason berth (2000–present)

Season-by-season records
Season	League	Regular-season					Postseason			MLB affiliate	Ref.
Season	League	Record	Win %	League	Division	GB	Record	Win %	Result	MLB affiliate	Ref.
2000^ * †	TL	83–57	.593	1st	1st	—	7–3	.700	Result	Won First Half Western Division title Won Western Division title vs. El Paso Diablos, 3–2; Won TL championship vs. Wichita Wranglers, 4–1	Houston Astros
2001^ *	TL	86–54	.614	1st	1st	—	3–4	.429	Won First Half Western Division title Won Western Division title vs. San Antonio Missions, 3–2; Lost TL championship vs. Arkansas Travelers, 2–0	Houston Astros	
2002^	TL	75–65	.536	4th	3rd	2	2–3	.400	Won First Half Western Division title Lost Western Division title vs. San Antonio Missions, 3–2	Houston Astros	
2003	TL	46–94	.329	8th	4th	42 1/2	—	—	—	Houston Astros	
2004^ *	TL	86–54	.614	1st	1st	—	1–4	.200	Won First and Second Half Western Division titles Won Western Division title Lost TL championship vs. Frisco RoughRiders, 4–1	Houston Astros	
2005	PCL	74–70	.514	7th	3rd	6 1/2	—	—	—	Houston Astros	
2006 * §	PCL	85–59	.590	2nd	1st	—	3–5	.375	Won American Conference Southern Division title Won American Conference title vs. Nashville Sounds, 3–2; Lost PCL championship vs. Tucson Sidewinders, 3–0	Houston Astros	
2007	PCL	61–81	.430	14th	4th	13	—	—	—	Houston Astros	
2008	PCL	64–79	.448	13th	4th	11 1/2	—	—	—	Houston Astros	
2009	PCL	63–81	.438	15th	4th	17	—	—	—	Houston Astros	
2010	PCL	57–87	.396	16th	4th	16 1/2	—	—	—	Houston Astros	
2011 *	PCL	87–57	.604	2nd	1st	—	1–3	.250	Won American Conference Southern Division title Lost American Conference title vs. Omaha Storm Chasers, 3–1	Texas Rangers	
2012	PCL	69–75	.479	11th	4th	11	—	—	—	Texas Rangers	
2013	PCL	73–71	.507	8th	3rd	9	—	—	—	Texas Rangers	
2014	PCL	70–74	.486	11th (tie)	3rd (tie)	9 1/2	—	—	—	Texas Rangers	
2015 * §	PCL	78–66	.542	5th (tie)	1st	—	5–3	.625	Won American Conference Southern Division title Won American Conference title vs. Oklahoma City Dodgers, 3–0; Lost PCL championship vs. Fresno Grizzlies, 3–2	Texas Rangers	
2016	PCL	71–72	.497	7th (tie)	2nd	12 1/2	—	—	—	Texas Rangers	
2017	PCL	66–72	.478	12th	3rd	23 1/2	—	—	—	Texas Rangers	
2018	PCL	65–73	.471	12th (tie)	4th	17	—	—	—	Texas Rangers	
2019 * §	PCL	84–56	.600	1st	1st	—	3–5	.375	Won American Conference Southern Division title Won American Conference title vs. Iowa Cubs, 3–2; Lost PCL championship vs. Sacramento River Cats, 3–0	Houston Astros	
2020	PCL	Season cancelled (COVID-19 pandemic)								Houston Astros	
2021	AAAW	67–62 (Note: In 2021, the team with the best record at the end of the regular-season was declared the Triple-A West champion. Round Rock had a 61–58 (.513) record, 11 1/2 games behind first place, which put them 5th (tie) in the league and 2nd (tie) in their division. The regular-season was followed by the Triple-A Final Stretch, a 10-game postseason tournament in which all 30 Triple-A clubs competed for the highest winning percentage. Round Rock finished the tournament tied for 7th place with a 6–4 (.600) record.)	.519	4th (tie)	2nd (tie)	7 1/2	—	—	—	Texas Rangers	
2022	PCL	79–71	.527	3rd	2nd	6	—	—	—	Texas Rangers	
2023^	PCL	89–60	.597	2nd	2nd	1 1/2	0–2	.000	Won second-half title Lost PCL championship vs. Oklahoma City Dodgers, 2–0	Texas Rangers	
2024	PCL	71–77	.480	7th	3rd	21 1/2	—	—	—	Texas Rangers	
2025	PCL	77–73	.513	5th (tie)	3rd	7	—	—	—	Texas Rangers	
2026	PCL	73–77	.487	5th (tie)	3rd (tie)	16 1/2	—	—	—	Texas Rangers	
Totals	—	1,899–1,817	.511	—	—	—	25–32	.439	—	—	—

== Dell Diamond attendance ==
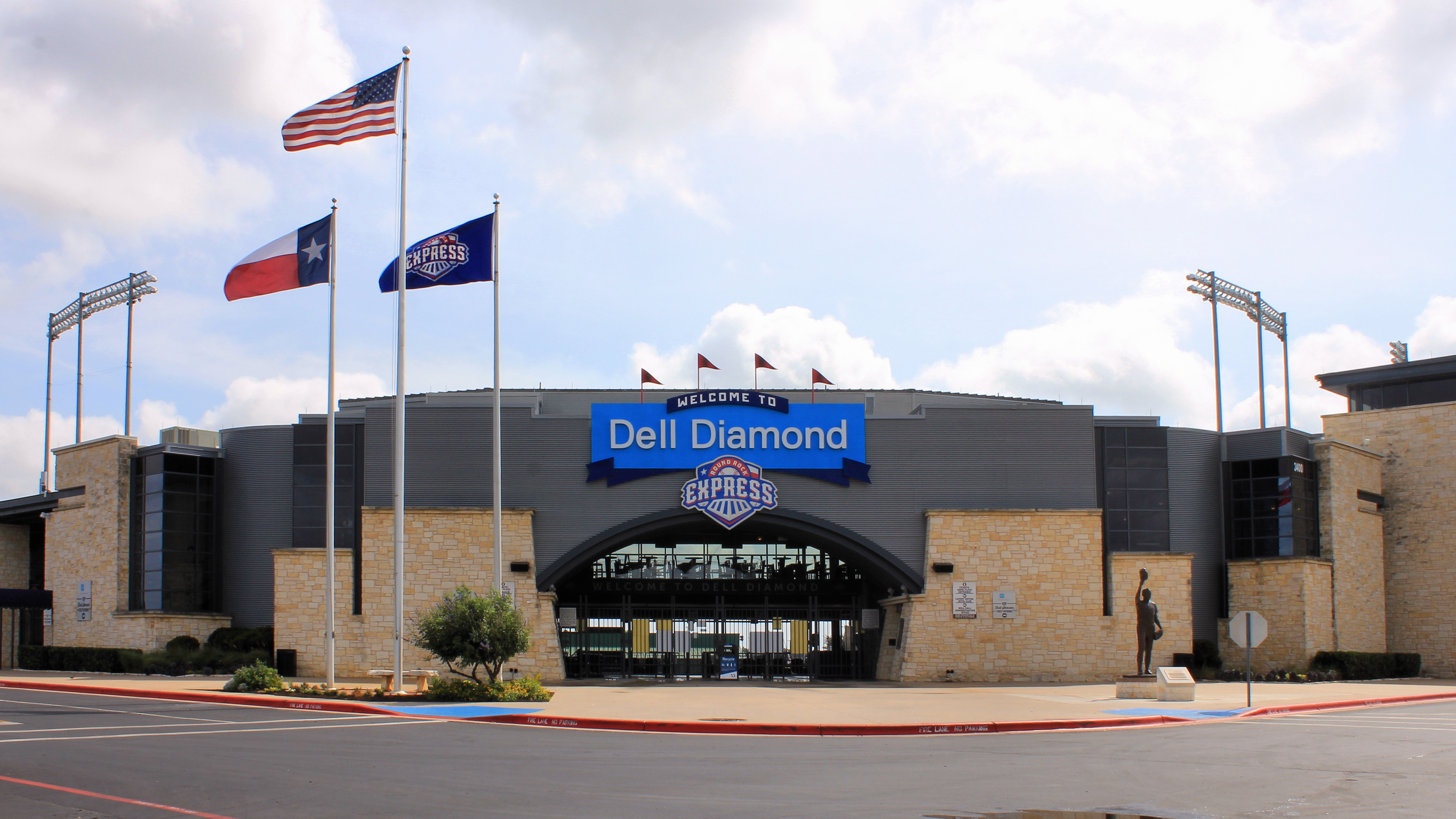
The Round Rock Express play home games at the Dell Diamond.

Season attendance records
Season	Average	Games	Total attendance	Affiliation
2000	9,430	70	660,110	Houston Astros (Double-A)
2001	9,554	70	668,792	Houston Astros (Double-A)
2002	9,573	70	670,176	Houston Astros (Double-A)
2003	9,799	70	685,973	Houston Astros (Double-A)
2004	9,847	70	689,286	Houston Astros (Double-A)
2005	9,726	72	700,277	Houston Astros (Triple-A)
2006	9,413	72	677,706	Houston Astros (Triple-A)
2007	9,466	70	662,595	Houston Astros (Triple-A)
2008	9,286	72	668,623	Houston Astros (Triple-A)
2009	8,707	72	626,899	Houston Astros (Triple-A)
2010	8,408	71	596,985	Houston Astros (Triple-A)
2011	8,587	72	618,261	Texas Rangers (Triple-A)
2012	8,389	71	595,584	Texas Rangers (Triple-A)
2013	8,181	72	589,042	Texas Rangers (Triple-A)
2014	8,390	71	595,700	Texas Rangers (Triple-A)
2015	8,623	69	595,012	Texas Rangers (Triple-A)
2016	8,627	71	613,226	Texas Rangers (Triple-A)
2017	8,724	70	610,681	Texas Rangers (Triple-A)
2018	8,809	70	616,636	Texas Rangers (Triple-A)
2019	8,542	70	597,928	Houston Astros (Triple-A)
2020	Season cancelled (COVID-19 pandemic)			Houston Astros (Triple-A)
2021	4,777	64	305,742	Texas Rangers (Triple-A)
2022	5,507	70	412,988	Texas Rangers (Triple-A)
2023	5,561	74	411,550	Texas Rangers (Triple-A)
2024	5,084	72	366,025	Texas Rangers (Triple-A)
2025	4,929	72	354,867	Texas Rangers (Triple-A)

Attendance ranking by affiliation (through 2025)
Rank	Average	Affiliation	Seasons	Games	Total attendance
1	9,311	Houston Astros	12	849	7,905,350
2	7,282	Texas Rangers	13	918	6,685,314

== Roster ==
Round Rock Express roster
Players	Coaches/Other
Pitchers: 21 Wilian Bormie; 0 Marc Church; 56 Luis Curvelo; 54 Alexis Díaz; 62 John King; 19 Janser Lara; 14 Ryan Lobus; 12 Dalton Pence; 36 Austin Roberts; 40 Joe Ross; 66 Josh Sborz; 31 Trey Supak; 16 Anthony Veneziano; Catchers: 5 Julian Brock; 13 Cooper Johnson; Infielders: 2 Jonah Bride; 3 Diego Castillo; 27 Frainyer Chavez; 24 Theo Hardy; 15 Keyber Rodriguez; 6 John Taylor; Outfielders: 18 Trevor Hauver; 35 Orlando Martinez; 10 Aaron Zavala; Designated hitters: 22 Sebastian Walcott	Manager: 17 Kyle Moore; Coaches: 58 Dave Borkowski (pitching); 33 Kawika Emsley-Pai (development); 20 Chase Lambin (bench); 0 Matt Lawson (hitting); 99 Julio Valdez (bullpen); 60-day injured list: -- Dane Acker; -- Declan Cronin; -- Daniel Missaki (full season); 7-day injured list; * On Texas Rangers 40-man roster; ~ Development list; # Rehab assignment; ∞ Reserve list; ‡ Restricted list; § Suspended list; † Temporarily inactive list; Roster updated October 1, 2026; Transactions; → More rosters: MiLB • Pacific Coast League; → Texas Rangers minor league players

== Notable alumni ==
- Yordan Alvarez (born 1997), MLB designated hitter and outfielder
- Josh Banks (born 1982), MLB pitcher
- Richard Bleier (born 1987), MLB pitcher
- John Buck, MLB catcher
- Roger Clemens, MLB pitcher
- Chris Davis, MLB first baseman
- Morgan Ensberg, MLB third baseman
- Joey Gallo, MLB outfielder and first baseman
- Mike Gallo, MLB pitcher
- Craig Gentry, MLB outfielder
- Keith Ginter, MLB onfielder
- Jason Hirsh, MLB pitcher
- Josh Jung, MLB third baseman
- Roy Oswalt, MLB pitcher
- Humberto Quintero, MLB catcher
- Myles Straw, MLB outfielder
- Garrett Stubbs, MLB catcher
- Taylor Teagarden, MLB catcher
- Hunter Pence, MLB outfielder
- Willy Taveras, MLB outfielder
- Kyle Tucker, MLB outfielder
- José Urquidy, MLB pitcher

== Popular culture ==
The "Play Ball" episode of The Simple Life, a reality television series starring young wealthy socialites Paris Hilton and Nicole Richie, took place during an Express game. The show aired on July 21, 2004, as the 15th episode of the show's second season.

The team made headlines in 2010 when it "signed" Billy Ray "Rojo" Johnson, described in a press release as an East Texan who grew up in Venezuela and had run-ins with the law. In reality, Johnson was actor Will Ferrell, who briefly took the mound at Dell Diamond to promote his nearby charity golf tournament.
