= Justin Leone =

American baseball player (born 1977)

- Third baseman
- Born: March 9, 1977 (age 49); Las Vegas, Nevada, U.S.
- Batted: Right Threw: Right

MLB debut
- July 2, 2004, for the Seattle Mariners

Last MLB appearance
- July 21, 2006, for the San Diego Padres

MLB statistics
- Batting average: .214
- Home runs: 6
- Runs batted in: 13
- Stats at Baseball Reference

Teams
- Seattle Mariners (2004); San Diego Padres (2006)

Justin Paul Leone (born March 9, 1977) is an American former professional baseball third baseman. He played in Major League Baseball (MLB) for the Seattle Mariners and San Diego Padres. He is an alumnus of St. Martin's University.

== Career ==
Drafted by the Seattle Mariners in the 13th round of the 1999 Major League Baseball draft, Leone made his Major League Baseball debut with Seattle on July 2, 2004. He spent the 2006 season in the San Diego Padres organization, making the Triple-A All-Star team that year, in which he also participated in the home run derby. He was a part of the 2003 USA Olympic Qualifying Team.

In 2003, Leone was named Texas League Player of the Year by Baseball America, Mariners Minor League Player of the Year by the Seattle organization and Texas League Player of the Year by Topps while playing for Double-A San Antonio. He started the season off the bench, but was picked to replace infielder Greg Dobbs after Dobbs went down with a season-ending injury.

Leone was the first Mariner to hit the KOMO Glove sign in left field during a game against the Cleveland Indians to earn a fan $1,000, it was also his first major league home run. Leone accomplished this two nights in a row.

From 2007-2008, Leone played in the San Francisco Giants organization and became a free agent at the end of the 2008 season. In December 2008, he signed a minor league deal with the New York Yankees and was assigned to Triple-A Scranton. On July 31, 2009 Leone was released by the Yankees. On September 1, 2009 Leone signed a Minor League contract with the Texas Rangers and was granted free agency on November 9, 2009.
