= Karl Kuehl =

American baseball coach and manager

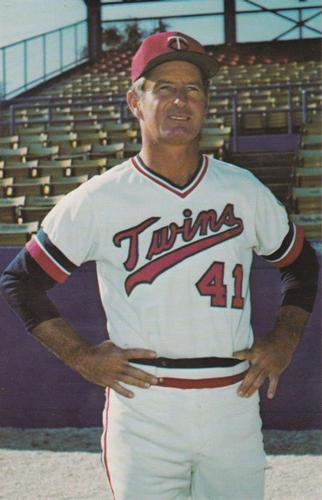
- Manager / Coach
- Born: September 5, 1937; Monterey Park, California, U.S.
- Died: August 6, 2008 (aged 70); Scottsdale, Arizona, U.S.
- Batted: Left Threw: Left
- Stats at Baseball Reference

Teams
- As manager: Montreal Expos (1976); As coach: Minnesota Twins (1977–1982)

Karl Otto Kuehl (/kiːl/ KEEL; September 5, 1937 – August 6, 2008) was an American professional baseball player and a scout, farm system official, coach and manager in Major League Baseball.

He also was the co-author of two books on the mental approach to baseball: The Mental Game of Baseball: A Guide to Peak Performance (1989) and A Champion's State of Mind (2005).

== Montreal Expos' manager (1976) ==
In 1976, Kuehl was named the second manager in the history of the Montreal Expos franchise, although he did not complete a full season in the job. His Expos won only 43 of 128 games (.336) and were in last place in the National League East Division when Kuehl was replaced by Charlie Fox on September 4.

He was promoted to Montreal after a successful stint as skipper of the Expos' top farm team, the Memphis Blues, in 1975. Previously, he managed the Double-A Québec Carnavals in 1972–1973 before moving up to Triple-A Memphis.

== Minor league career ==
Kuehl was born in Monterey Park, California. As a player, he was a 5 ft 11 in (1.80 m), 175 lb (79 kg) minor league first baseman and outfielder who batted and threw left-handed. He played in the farm system of the Cincinnati Redlegs from 1955 through 1958, rising to the Seattle Rainiers of the Open-Classification Pacific Coast League for ten games in 1957, compiling a lifetime .306 batting average.

He began his managing career at the young age of 21 as the player manager of the unaffiliated Salem Senators of the Class B Northwest League in 1959.

He rejoined the Cincinnati system in 1961 as pilot of the Class D Geneva Redlegs of the New York–Penn League. He then worked as a scout and minor league manager for the Houston Astros and the Seattle Pilots/Milwaukee Brewers before joining the Montreal organization in 1971.

== Major League coach and executive ==
After weathering the 1976 debacle, Kuehl remained in the Major Leagues as a coach with the Minnesota Twins under manager Gene Mauch, whom he had replaced in Montreal. He also served under Mauch's successors, Johnny Goryl and Billy Gardner, during his six years (1977–1982) with the Twins.

Kuehl then headed the player development department of the Oakland Athletics from 1983 through 1995, a period when the A's had one of the most productive farm systems in baseball. After leaving Oakland, he spent two seasons (1996–1997) in the front office of the Toronto Blue Jays. From 2001 to 2007, Kuehl was special advisor, baseball operations, for the Cleveland Indians.

He died as a result of pulmonary fibrosis on August 6, 2008, in a Scottsdale, Arizona, hospital at the age of 70.

== Managerial statistics ==
Team	Year	Regular season				Postseason			
Team	Year	Won	Lost	Win %	Finish	Won	Lost	Win %	Result
MON	1976	43	85	.336	6th in NL East	–	–	–	–
