= Joey Curletta =

American baseball player (born 1994)

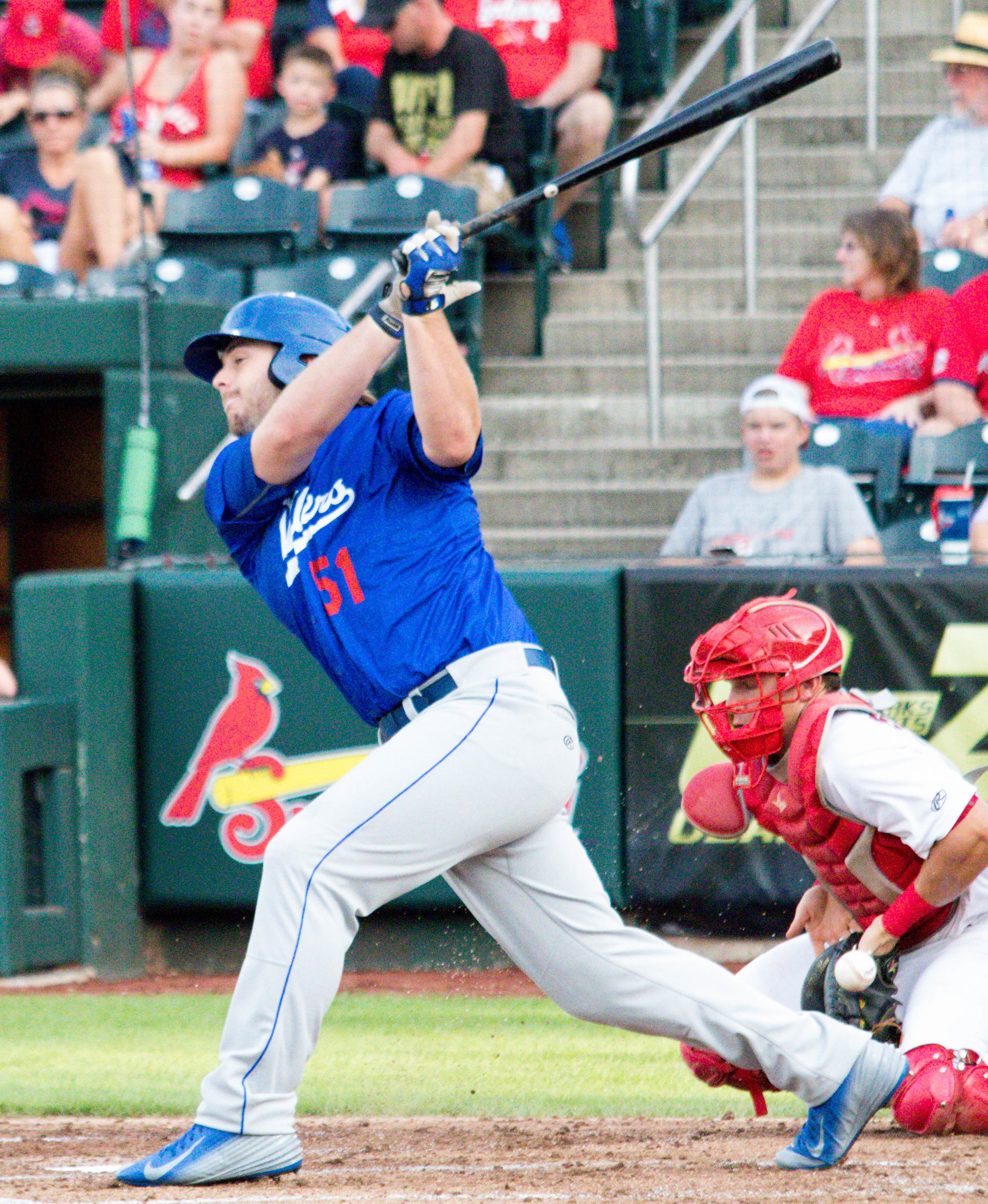
- Curletta with the Tulsa Drillers in 2016
- First baseman
- Born: March 8, 1994 (age 32); Phoenix, Arizona, U.S.
- Bats: Right Throws: Right
- Stats at Baseball Reference

Joseph Dominic Curletta (born March 8, 1994) is an American former professional baseball first baseman. Despite spending time on the 40-man rosters of the Seattle Mariners and Boston Red Sox, he never played in Major League Baseball (MLB).

== Career ==
=== Los Angeles Dodgers ===
Curletta attended Mountain Pointe High School in Ahwatukee, Phoenix, Arizona. The Los Angeles Dodgers selected Curletta in the sixth round of the 2012 MLB draft, and he signed with the Dodgers rather than attend the University of Arizona.

Curletta began his professional career with the Arizona League Dodgers. He played for the Ogden Raptors in the Rookie-level Pioneer League in 2013 and the Great Lakes Loons of the Single–A Midwest League in 2014.

=== Seattle Mariners ===
On September 15, 2016, the Dodgers sent Curletta to the Philadelphia Phillies as the player to be named later in their earlier trade for Carlos Ruiz. On March 12, 2017, the Phillies traded Curletta to the Mariners in exchange for Pat Venditte. He played for the Modesto Nuts of the High–A California League in 2017. In 2018, he played for the Arkansas Travelers of the Double–A Texas League, and he won the Texas League Player of the Year Award. Curletta was awarded the Ken Griffey Jr. Minor League Hitter of the Year by the Seattle Mariners for his 2018 season.

On October 31, 2018, the Mariners added Curletta to their 40-man roster to protect him from the Rule 5 draft. He began the 2019 season with the Tacoma Rainiers of the Triple–A Pacific Coast League.

=== Boston Red Sox ===
On May 4, 2019, the Boston Red Sox claimed Curletta off of waivers, and assigned him to the Portland Sea Dogs of the Double–A Eastern League. On September 1, the Red Sox assigned Curletta outright to Portland, removing him from their 40-man roster. He elected free agency following the season on November 4.

=== Los Angeles Angels ===
On December 6, 2019, Curletta signed a minor league contract with the Los Angeles Angels. He did not play in a game in 2020 due to the cancellation of the minor league season because of the COVID-19 pandemic. Curletta was released by the Angels organization on May 29, 2020.
