= Beaumont Golden Gators =

- 1983–1986; Beaumont, Texas
Team logo
Cap insignia

Minor league affiliations
- Class: Double-A (1983–1986)
- League: Texas League (1983–1986)

Major league affiliations
- Team: San Diego Padres (1983–1986)

Minor league titles
- League titles: 1983
- Division titles: 1983; 1984
- First-half titles: 1983; 1984
- Second-half titles: 1984

Team data
- Colors: Green, gold, white
- Ballpark: Vincent–Beck Stadium (1983–1986)

The Beaumont Golden Gators were a minor league baseball team in the Class AA Texas League from 1983 to 1986. Owned by insurance man Ted Moor, the team was an affiliate of the San Diego Padres for their entire tenure. Future Major League Baseball players John Kruk, Roberto Alomar, Joey Cora, Ozzie Guillén, Sandy Alomar Jr., Shane Mack, and Benito Santiago all played at one time for the Golden Gators. The team played its home games at Vincent-Beck Stadium on the campus of Lamar University in Beaumont, Texas and won the 1983 Texas League championship. Their uniforms were a gaudy gold, white, and green and the hats were of the historic pillbox variety with a white B surrounded by a golden triangle. The cities of Beaumont, Port Arthur, and Orange are known in local parlance as the "Golden Triangle." The oil bust in 1986 caused the local economy to falter and Moor sold the team to a group that moved them to Wichita, Kansas before the 1987 season, becoming the Wichita Pilots. The team spent 21 seasons in Wichita, being renamed the Wichita Wranglers in 1989, before moving to Springdale, Arkansas and becoming the Northwest Arkansas Naturals. Prior to their time in Beaumont the team had been the Amarillo Gold Sox.

== Joey Cora stabbing ==
The Golden Gators received national attention when on June 22, 1986 their second baseman, Joey Cora, was stabbed after a game in San Antonio, Texas. Cora, who had been a first round draft pick, was waiting outside the team bus following the game against the San Antonio Missions at V.J. Keefe Stadium when two men called his name and then assaulted him. He was stabbed once in the stomach and once in the arm. Cora was quickly rushed to the hospital and later made a full recovery after spending six weeks on the disabled list. A man named Jose Puente, 29, was caught at the scene and was later charged with attempted murder. No motive was ever given for the crime.

== Year-by-year record ==
Year	Record	Finish	Manager	Playoffs
1983	68-68	5th	Jack Maloof	League Champs
1984	89-47	1st	Bobby Tolan	Lost League Finals
1985	69-67	4th	Bobby Tolan	
1986	60-76	7th	Steve Smith	
