= Galveston Sand Crabs =

The Galveston Sand Crabs were a professional baseball team based in Texas. The team competed in the South Texas League and Texas League, and was an active baseball team from the 1903 season until the 1912 season and from 1922 to 1924. The team later merged to create the Galveston Buccaneers.

Galveston was home to the Galveston White Caps (1950–1955), Galveston Buccaneers (1931–1937), the earlier Galveston Sand Crabs (1889–1890, 1892, 1895–1899), Galveston Pirates (1912-1917, 1919–1920) and Galveston Giants (1888).
