= Sebastian Walcott =

Bahamian baseball player (born 2006)

Texas Rangers – No. 89
- Shortstop / Third baseman
- Born: March 14, 2006 (age 20); Nassau, The Bahamas
- Bats: Right Throws: Right
- Stats at Baseball Reference

Sebastian Edward Walcott (born March 14, 2006) is a Bahamian professional baseball shortstop and third baseman in the Texas Rangers organization.

== Professional career ==
Walcott signed with the Texas Rangers as an international free agent in January 2023. He made his professional debut that year with the Dominican Summer League Rangers. After nine games, he was promoted to the Arizona Complex League Rangers of the Rookie-level Arizona Complex League. He was later promoted to the Hickory Crawdads. Walcott returned to Hickory to open the 2024 season. Walcott represented Texas at the 2024 All-Star Futures Game.

The Rangers invited Walcott to spring training as a non-roster player in 2025. He spent the entire season with the Double-A Frisco RoughRiders, slashing .255/.355/.386 with 13 home runs, 59 RBI, and 32 stolen bases.

On February 12, 2026, it was announced that Walcott was in jeopardy of missing the 2026 season due to an ulnar collateral ligament injury that required surgery.
