= Galveston Buccaneers =

The Galveston Buccaneers were a Minor League Baseball team that existed from 1931 to 1937. Based in Galveston, Texas, United States, they played in the Texas League. Their home ballpark was Moody Stadium. Notable players include Del Pratt, Beau Bell, Wally Moses and Harry Brecheen. In 1934, they were the league champions.

From 1933 to 1935, the Buccaneers were in the playoffs for the Texas League title. In 1933, they were the runners-up in the Championship Series to the San Antonio Missions. In 1934, Galveston captured only its third Texas League crown; the other titles were in 1890 and 1899. In 1935, the Buccaneers finished third with an 86–75 record but were defeated in the first round of the playoffs.

The Galveston Buccaneers were the subject of a 2015 book, "The Galveston Buccaneers" by Kris Rutherford, Arcadia Publishing, ISBN No. 162619873.

Galveston was also home to the Galveston White Caps (1950-1955), Galveston Sand Crabs (1889-1890, 1892, 1897–99, 1907-1911, 1922-1924), Galveston Pirates (1912–17, 1919-1921) and Galveston Giants (1888).

== Notable players ==
- Jack Mealey (1899-1977) -- minor league baseball catcher, who also managed in the minor leagues and served as president of the Sooner State League

== Sources ==
- "Baseball in the Lone Star State: Texas League's Greatest Hits," Tom Kayser and David King, Trinity University Press 2005
