= Jackson Mets =

- 1975–1990; Jackson, Mississippi

Minor league affiliations
- Class: Double-A (1975–1990)
- League: Texas League
- Division: North Division

Major league affiliations
- Team: New York Mets

Minor league titles
- League titles: 1981, 1984, 1985
- Division titles: 1981, 1983, 1984, 1985, 1986, 1987
- First-half titles: 1981, 1982, 1983, 1984, 1986
- Second-half titles: 1978, 1980, 1984, 1985, 1987, 1990

Team data
- Previous names: Victoria Toros (1974)
- Colors: Blue, orange, white
- Ballpark: Smith-Wills Stadium

The Jackson Mets were a professional baseball team based in Jackson, Mississippi, from 1975 through 1990. Until surpassed by the Mississippi Braves in 2021, they were the longest-tenured club to be based in the Jackson metropolitan area. For their entire sixteen seasons of existence, they competed in the Texas League as the Class AA affiliate of the New York Mets, until the club moved to Williamsport, Pennsylvania for the 1991 season and then to Binghamton, New York, for the 1992 season.

== Early years in Jackson ==
The Jackson Mets came into existence in 1974 when the New York Mets moved their AA club, the Victoria Toros, after only one year in Victoria, Texas. Civic leaders in Jackson had mounted a campaign to build a new stadium for a minor-league club. At the time, Jackson had not fielded a club since the Jackson Senators last played in the Class C Cotton States League in 1953. Previous minor-league teams based in Jackson had played downtown at a field on the Mississippi State Fairgrounds, but the new park, which would be named Smith-Wills Stadium, was constructed on Lakeland Drive just east of Interstate 55 in the more suburban area of northeast Jackson. When the team opened play in 1975, the park still had no lights, an unpaved parking lot, no roof on its press box, and was temporarily locating its club offices in a trailer. In their first few years in Jackson, the Mets drew an average of 1,600 fans a game. Ed Kneip was the Jackson Mets original general manager, helping to lead the charge to bring the team to Jackson.

1976 and 1977 were the only two years the Jackson Mets recorded losing records for the entire season until 1988.

== The 1980s ==
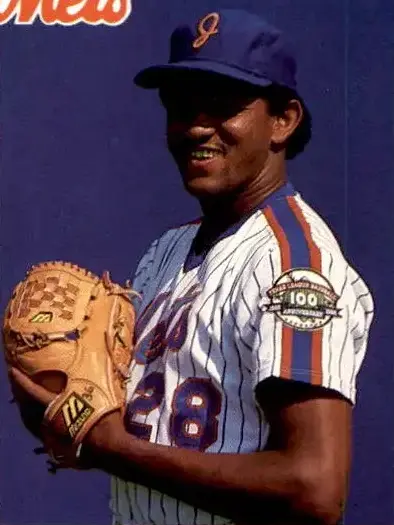
José Bautista with the team, ca. 1987

During the 1980s, the Jackson Mets emerged as one of the preeminent clubs in the Texas League. The team made the playoffs nine times between 1978 and 1987, including eight consecutive trips, and appeared in seven Texas League Championship Series, including five in row from 1983-87. They won three Texas League titles, in 1981, 1984, and 1985. Fans in Jackson responded to the team's success: more than 112,000 people flocked to Smith-Wills Stadium in 1981, the year that future big-league manager Davey Johnson piloted the Jackson Mets to their first Eastern Division title. Continued winning seasons by the Mets kept attendance above the 100,000 mark for the next six years.

Several future Major-League players spent part of their minor-league careers as Jackson Mets. The 1984 championship squad included Billy Beane, who hit 20 home runs, and Lenny Dykstra, who stole 53 bases. The Mets pitching staff was anchored by Calvin Schiraldi, who went 14-3, and also featured Rick Aguilera, Roger McDowell, Jay Tibbs, and Floyd Youmans. The 1985 team that repeated as champs was led by Dave Magadan, Randy Milligan, Mark Carreon, and Barry Lyons, all of whom hit over .300. In addition, at various points the Mets fielded future major-leaguers Lee Mazzilli, José Bautista, Mike Scott, Jeff Reardon, Hubie Brooks, Jody Davis, Darryl Strawberry, Kevin Mitchell, Terry Blocker, John Gibbons, and Kevin Elster.

== Move ==
At the close of the 1990 season, the Mets organization announced their desire to move the Jackson Mets closer to the parent club. And so, the team's affiliation was moved to Binghamton, New York, where it became the Binghamton Mets in the Eastern League. For the 1991 season, the Houston Astros relocated their AA affiliate to Jackson. This team would be named the Jackson Generals (now located in Corpus Christi, Texas; not the same as the now defunct Southern League team in Tennessee) in a contest, the winning moniker representing General Andrew Jackson, the military army officer who later became President of the United States and for whom the city of Jackson is named.

== Year-by-year record ==
| Year | Record | Finish | Manager | Playoffs |
|---|---|---|---|---|
| 1975 | 65-65 | 4th | John Antonelli | |
| 1976 | 69-66 | 4th | John Antonelli | |
| 1977 | 62-68 | 5th (t) | Bob Wellman | |
| 1978 | 76-58 | 4th | Bob Wellman | Lost League Finals |
| 1979 | 70-65 | 5th | Bob Wellman | |
| 1980 | 74-62 | 4th (t) | Bob Wellman | Lost in 1st round |
| 1981 | 68-66 | 4th | Davey Johnson | League Champs |
| 1982 | 68-65 | 3rd | Gene Dusan | Lost in 1st round |
| 1983 | 69-67 | 3rd (t) | Bob Schaefer | Lost League Finals |
| 1984 | 83-53 | 2nd | Sam Perlozzo | League Champs |
| 1985 | 73-63 | 2nd | Sam Perlozzo | League Champs |
| 1986 | 72-63 | 3rd | Mike Cubbage | Lost League Finals |
| 1987 | 70-66 | 5th (t) | Tucker Ashford | Lost League Finals |
| 1988 | 61-75 | 7th | Tucker Ashford | |
| 1989 | 61-74 | 7th | Steve Swisher | |
| 1990 | 73-62 | 3rd | Clint Hurdle | Lost in 1st round |
