= Wichita Wranglers =

- 1987–2007; Wichita, Kansas
Team logo
Cap insignia

Minor league affiliations
- Class: Double-A (1987–2007)
- League: Texas League (1987–2007)

Major league affiliations
- Team: Kansas City Royals (1995–2007); San Diego Padres (1987–1994)

Minor league titles
- League titles (3): 1987; 1992; 1999
- Division titles (9): 1987; 1989; 1992; 1996; 1998; 1999; 2000; 2006
- First-half titles (6): 1987; 1989; 1992; 1996; 1999; 2006
- Second-half titles (8): 1989; 1995; 1998; 1999; 2000; 2001; 2002; 2003
- Wild card berths: 1993

Team data
- Name: Wichita Wranglers (1989–2007); Wichita Pilots (1987–1988)
- Colors: Red, black, white, gray, tan
- Ballpark: Lawrence–Dumont Stadium (1987–2007)

The Wichita Wranglers were a minor league baseball team based in Wichita, Kansas. The team, which played in the Texas League, was the Double-A affiliate of Major League Baseball's San Diego Padres from 1987 to 1994 and the Kansas City Royals from 1995 to 2007. The Wranglers played in Wichita's Lawrence–Dumont Stadium. Built in 1934 and renovated for the second time in 2001, the park held 6,400 people as of the Wranglers' last season.

Following the completion of the 2007 season, the team was relocated to Springdale, Arkansas, where it became the Northwest Arkansas Naturals, which continue to play in the Texas League as the Double-A affiliate of the Royals.

The Wranglers won the Texas League Championship in 1987, 1992, and 1999. In 1995, Wichita's Johnny Damon won the Texas League Player of the Year Award. Alex Gordon won the award in 2006. Andy Benes was selected as the league's Pitcher of the Year in 1989.
