= List of Pacific Coast League team rosters =

Each of the 10 teams of Minor League Baseball's Pacific Coast League carry a 28-man active roster. Only these players are eligible to play.

Teams may have any number of inactive players on their rosters at a given time who do not count toward active roster limits. Injured players may be placed on the injured list (7-day or 60-day). The temporary inactive list and bereavement list are for players attending to personal matters. Major league players may be placed on rosters for injury rehabilitation for a maximum of 20 days for non-pitchers and 30 days for pitchers.

Players who are ineligible to play due to failure to adhere to the Minor League Drug Prevention and Treatment Program, violations of their contract, who are receiving team disciplinary action, or who are unable to join the team due to visa problems may be placed on the restricted or suspended lists. These players count against a team's active roster limit.

Each team usually has a three-man coaching staff including a manager, hitting coach, and pitching coach. Depending on each Major League Baseball organization's development approach, some teams may have additional coaches.

== East Division ==
=== Albuquerque Isotopes ===
Albuquerque Isotopes roster
Players	Coaches/Other
Pitchers: 36 Zach Agnos *; 56 Valente Bellozo *; 23 Jeff Criswell * #; 36 Stu Flesland III; 43 Mason Green; 59 Welinton Herrera *; 49 Gabriel Hughes *; 40 Fisher Jameson; -- Evan Justice; 53 Ryan Miller; 65 Parker Mushinski; 14 Carson Palmquist *; 61 Luis Peralta *; 50 Erasmo Ramirez *; 27 T. J. Shook; 37 Carson Skipper; 57 Sean Sullivan ~; 35 Keegan Thompson; 63 Bryson Van Sickle; 38 Patrick Weigel; Catchers: 30 Jose Cordova; 10 Braxton Fulford *; 9 Andrew Knizner; -- Kyle McCann; Infielders: 1 Adael Amador *; 18 Blaine Crim *; 25 Nic Kent; 12 Vimael Machin; 47 Ryan Ritter *; 39 Chad Stevens; Outfielders: 11 Drew Avans; 2 Cole Carrigg; 24 Charlie Condon; 13 Zac Veen *	Manager: 16 Pedro Lopez; Coaches: 54 Craig Bjornson (pitching); 3 Luis Lopez (bench); 29 Matt Snyder (hitting); 60-day injured list: 31 Mason Albright; -- Jarrod Cande; 30 Brayan Castillo; 60 Adam Laskey; 7-day injured list; * On Colorado Rockies 40-man roster; ~ Development list; # Rehab assignment; ∞ Reserve list; ‡ Restricted list; § Suspended list; † Temporarily inactive list; Roster updated May 17, 2026; Transactions; → More rosters: MiLB • Pacific Coast League; → Colorado Rockies minor league players

=== El Paso Chihuahuas ===
El Paso Chihuahuas roster
Players	Coaches/Other
Pitchers: -- Ty Adcock; 57 Sean Boyle; 41 Griffin Canning #*; 32 Miguel Cienfuegos; 34 Evan Fitterer; 43 Logan Gillaspie; 37 Marco Gonzales; 68 Kyle Hart *; 25 Garrett Hawkins *; 33 Alek Jacob *; 29 Yuki Matsui #*; 52 Triston McKenzie ~; 66 David Morgan; 55 Ethan Routzahn; 41 Fernando Sanchez; 50 JP Sears *; 15 Misael Tamarez; 36 Eli Villalobos; 49 Jackson Wolf; 28 Justin Yeager; Catchers: 9 Anthony Vilar; 54 Colton Vincent ~; Infielders: 5 Marcos Castañon; 56 Victor Duarte; 4 Clay Dungan; 7 Mason McCoy *; 11 José Miranda; 10 Nate Mondou ~; 8 Nick Solak; 24 Samad Taylor; 17 Will Wagner *; Outfielders: 2 Jase Bowen; 20 Pablo Reyes; 27 Carlos Rodríguez; 30 Nick Schnell	Manager: 3 Pete Zamora; Coaches: 16 Morgan Burkhart (bench); 13 Miguel Del Castillo (bench); 45 Jimmy Jones (assistant pitching); 12 Scott Mitchell (pitching); 53 Ben Rosenthal (hitting); 60-day injured list: 63 Daison Acosta; 8 José Leclerc; 7-day injured list; * On San Diego Padres 40-man roster; ~ Development list; # Rehab assignment; ∞ Reserve list; ‡ Restricted list; § Suspended list; † Temporarily inactive list; Roster updated May 17, 2026; Transactions; → More rosters: MiLB • Pacific Coast League; → San Diego Padres minor league players

=== Oklahoma City Comets ===
Oklahoma City Comets roster
Players	Coaches/Other
Pitchers: 22 Logan Allen; 23 Charlie Barnes *; 51 Chris Campos; 36 Carlos Durán; 24 Jake Eder *; 29 Jackson Ferris; 17 Nick Frasso; 19 Cole Irvin; 18 Antoine Kelly; 53 Antonio Knowles; 57 Ronan Kopp *; 56 Garrett McDaniels; 31 Chayce McDermott *; 12 Griff McGarry; 39 Keynan Middleton; 45 Christian Romero; 54 Jerming Rosario; 35 River Ryan *; 11 Ryder Ryan; 21 Jordan Weems; Catchers: 27 Eliézer Alfonzo Jr.; 52 Chuckie Robinson; 33 Seby Zavala ~; Infielders: 12 David Bote ‡; 9 Ryan Fitzgerald; 27 Tyler Fitzgerald *; 5 Alex Freeland *; 2 Austin Gauthier; 8 Kiké Hernández #; 7 Noah Miller; Outfielders: 4 Zach Ehrhard; 14 Jack Suwinski; 3 James Tibbs III; 10 Ryan Ward *	Manager: 46 Scott Hennessey; Coaches: 16 David Anderson (pitching); 26 David Dahl (outfield); 48 Ryan Dennick (pitching); -- Paul Fournier (performance); -- KJ Hallgren (coach); 52 Tyler Hollow (development); 47 Dylan Nasiastka (hitting); -- Ethan Quarles (performance); 30 Dickie Joe Thon (bench); 60-day injured list: 93 Yency Almonte; 56 Matt Gorski; 44 José Rodríguez; -- Ryan Sublette; 7-day injured list; * On Los Angeles Dodgers 40-man roster; ~ Development list; # Rehab assignment; ∞ Reserve list; ‡ Restricted list; § Suspended list; † Temporarily inactive list; Roster updated May 18, 2026; Transactions; → More rosters: MiLB • Pacific Coast League; → Los Angeles Dodgers minor league players

=== Round Rock Express ===
Round Rock Express roster
Players	Coaches/Other
Pitchers: 19 Dane Acker; 28 Robby Ahlstrom; 24 Aidan Anderson †; 39 Ben Anderson; 45 Austin Bergner; 52 Ryan Brasier; 0 Marc Church; 59 José Corniell *; 56 Luis Curvelo ^{#} *; 26 David Davalillo *; 54 Alexis Díaz; 16 Kyle Funkhouser; 47 Thomas Ireland; 55 Chris Martin ^{#} *; 48 Michel Otañez *; 66 Josh Sborz ~; 29 Josh Stephan; 31 Trey Supak; 30 Emiliano Teodo *; 22 Mason Thompson; Catchers: 12 José Herrera; 13 Cooper Johnson; Infielders: 2 Jonah Bride; 3 Diego Castillo; 11 Cam Cauley; 18 Trevor Hauver; 21 Richie Martin; 14 Nick Pratto; Outfielders: 15 Dairon Blanco; 9 Gilberto Celestino; 10 Aaron Zavala	Manager: 17 Kyle Moore; Coaches: 58 Dave Borkowski (pitching); 33 Kawika Emsley-Pai (development); 20 Chase Lambin (development); 0 Matt Lawson (hitting); 99 Julio Valdez (bullpen); 60-day injured list: -- Nabil Crismatt (full season); -- Declan Cronin; -- Daniel Missaki (full season); 36 Patrick Murphy; 7-day injured list; * On Texas Rangers 40-man roster; ~ Development list; # Rehab assignment; ∞ Reserve list; ‡ Restricted list; § Suspended list; † Temporarily inactive list; Roster updated May 18, 2026; Transactions; → More rosters: MiLB • Pacific Coast League; → Texas Rangers minor league players

=== Sugar Land Space Cowboys ===
Sugar Land Space Cowboys roster
Players	Coaches/Other
Pitchers: 48 Jason Alexander; 15 Brandon Bielak; 38 Sam Carlson; 59 Tom Cosgrove; 55 Jose Fleury ~; 68 J.P. France; 61 Colton Gordon *; 33 Josh Hendrickson; 45 Tatsuya Imai * #; 54 Michael Knorr; 40 Anthony Maldonado; 26 Joey Mancini; 37 Brandon McPherson; 46 Roddery Muñoz; 30 Ethan Pecko; 23 Christian Roa *; 49 Alimber Santa; 45 Miguel Ullola *; 52 Logan VanWey *; 51 Ryan Weiss *; 34 Miguel Yajure; Catchers: 25 Fernando Caldera ~; 29 Carlos Pérez; 32 Collin Price; Infielders: 22 CJ Alexander; 2 Jax Biggers; 14 Cavan Biggio; 21 James Nelson; 23 Tommy Sacco Jr.; 12 Riley Unroe; 11 Jack Winkler; Outfielders: 13 Kellen Strahm; 66 Rhylan Thomas *	Manager: 17 Mickey Storey; Coaches: 28 Sean Buchanan (pitching); 19 Drew Saylor (hitting); 1 Wladimir Sutil (development); 60-day injured list: 80 Edwin Díaz; 7-day injured list; * On Houston Astros 40-man roster; ~ Development list; # Rehab assignment; ∞ Reserve list; ‡ Restricted list; § Suspended list; † Temporarily inactive list; Roster updated May 15, 2026; Transactions; → More rosters: MiLB • Pacific Coast League; → Houston Astros minor league players

== West Division ==
=== Las Vegas Aviators ===
Las Vegas Aviators roster
Players	Coaches/Other
Pitchers: 37 Elvis Alvarado *; 64 Nick Anderson; 22 Mason Barnett *; 18 Brady Basso *; 35 Ben Bowden; 32 Stevie Emanuels; 40 Joey Estes *; 44 Tyler Ferguson *; 31 Geoff Hartlieb ~; 30 Nick Hernandez; 14 Gage Jump; 49 Michael Kelly *; 29 Matt Krook; 19 Luis Morales *; 77 Kade Morris; 28 Braden Nett *; 51 Wander Suero; 99 Yunior Tur; 84 Chen Zhong-Ao Zhuang; Catchers: 27 Bryan Lavastida; 59 CJ Rodriguez ~; 5 Brian Serven; 4 Chad Wallach; Infielders: 7 Colby Halter; 11 Brett Harris *; 44 Joshua Kuroda-Grauer; 13 Joey Meneses; 6 Drew Swift; 47 Tommy White; Outfielders: 21 Brayan Buelvas; 16 Jared Dickey; 12 Cade Marlowe; 1 Junior Perez *	Manager: 39 Fran Riordan; Coaches: 48 Paul Abbott (pitching); 55 Kevin Kouzmanoff (assistant hitting); 24 Brian McArn (hitting); 37 Don Schulze (assistant pitching); 60-day injured list: 54 Blake Beers; -- Gustavo Rodriguez; 7-day injured list; * On Athletics 40-man roster; ~ Development list; # Rehab assignment; ∞ Reserve list; ‡ Restricted list; § Suspended list; † Temporarily inactive list; Roster updated May 17, 2026; Transactions; → More rosters: MiLB • Pacific Coast League; → Athletics minor league players

=== Reno Aces ===
Reno Aces roster
Players	Coaches/Other
Pitchers: 50 Philip Abner *; 38 Mitch Bratt *; 23 Juan Burgos *; 49 Isaiah Campbell; 8 Gerardo Carrillo; 30 Yilber Díaz *; 40 Kohl Drake *; 37 Spencer Giesting; 45 Thomas Hatch; 47 Tommy Henry *; 56 Andrew Hoffmann *; 20 Drey Jameson *; 27 Bryce Jarvis; 18 Yu-Min Lin; 54 Taylor Rashi *; 39 Dylan Ray *; 41 Joe Ross; 34 Kade Strowd *; Catchers: 58 Jeremiah Boyd; 35 Aramis Garcia *; 13 Christian Cerda; Infielders: 21 Jacob Amaya; 50 Luken Baker *; 6 LuJames Groover; 26 Tyler Locklear *; 3 Anderdson Rojas; 28 Carlos Santana * #; 7 Tommy Troy; 4 Luis Urías #; Outfielders: 11 Jack Hurley ~; 56 Kristian Robinson	Manager: 12 Jeff Gardner; Coaches: 55 Jeff Bajenaru (pitching); 51 Doug Drabek (pitching); 25 Josue Perez (hitting); -- Jordan Procyshen (coach); 44 Shawn Roof (bench); 43 Terrmel Sledge (hitting); 60-day injured list: 53 A.J. Vukovich; 7-day injured list; * On Arizona Diamondbacks 40-man roster; ~ Development list; # Rehab assignment; ∞ Reserve list; ‡ Restricted list; § Suspended list; † Temporarily inactive list; Roster updated May 18, 2026; Transactions; → More rosters: MiLB • Pacific Coast League; → Arizona Diamondbacks minor league players

=== Sacramento River Cats ===
Sacramento River Cats roster
Players	Coaches/Other
Pitchers: 56 Tristan Beck *; 40 John Michael Bertrand; 33 Spencer Bivens *; 58 Jason Foley * #; 38 Michael Fulmer; 48 Trent Harris; 29 Marques Johnson; 35 Seth Lonsway; 19 Nick Margevicius; 28 Wilkin Ramos; 32 Braxton Roxby; 26 Juan Sanchez; 15 Gregory Santos *; 55 Carson Seymour *; 57 Dylan Smith *; 56 Blade Tidwell *; 7 Ryan Walker *; 18 Carson Whisenhunt *; 52 Nick Zwack; Catchers: 14 Drew Cavanaugh; 5 Thomas Gavello; 54 Zach Morgan; 21 Daniel Susac * #; 13 Logan Porter; Infielders: 10 Aeverson Arteaga; 49 Osleivis Basabe; 6 Nate Furman; 23 Jake Holton; 34 Buddy Kennedy; 50 Christian Koss *; Outfielders: 10 Harrison Bader * #; 19 Victor Bericoto; 51 Turner Hill; 75 Grant McCray *	Manager: 45 Dave Brundage; Coaches: 8 Jolbert Cabrera (fundamentals); 16 Will Kahn (bullpen catcher); 31 P.J. Pilittere (hitting); 43 Alain Quijano (pitching); 50 Rob Riggins (assistant hitting); 60-day injured list: -- Reggie Crawford; 7-day injured list; * On San Francisco Giants 40-man roster; ~ Development list; # Rehab assignment; ∞ Reserve list; ‡ Restricted list; § Suspended list; † Temporarily inactive list; Roster updated May 16, 2026; Transactions; → More rosters: MiLB • Pacific Coast League; → San Francisco Giants minor league players

=== Salt Lake Bees ===
Salt Lake Bees roster
Players	Coaches/Other
Pitchers: 10 Sam Aldegheri *; 37 Shaun Anderson; 52 Brady Choban; 36 Caden Dana *; 18 Justin Dunn; 48 Houston Harding; 32 Ryan Johnson *#; 15 Brett Kerry; 19 George Klassen *; 43 Joey Lucchesi *; 47 Alek Manoah *; 29 Samy Natera Jr.; 50 Kaleb Ort; 34 Taylor Saucedo *; 33 Jared Southard; 1 Najer Victor; 35 Huascar Ynoa; Catchers: 16 Zach Humphreys; 14 Logan O'Hoppe *#; 28 Omar Martinez *; 17 Alberto Rios ~; 6 Austin Wynns *; Infielders: 8 Jeimer Candelario; 13 Denzer Guzmán *; 24 Niko Kavadas; 2 Nick Madrigal; 26 Trey Mancini; 7 Christian Moore *; 5 Yolmer Sánchez; 44 Donovan Walton; Outfielders: 3 Nelson Rada; 9 Chris Taylor; 31 Bryce Teodosio *	Manager: 23 Doug Davis; Coaches: 40 Andy Hawkins (assistant pitching); 11 Shane Loux (pitching); 30 Alonzo Powell (hitting); 27 Jack Santora; 60-day injured list: -- Mason Erla; -- Hayden Seig; -- Blake Weiman; 7-day injured list; * On Los Angeles Angels 40-man roster; ~ Development list; # Rehab assignment; ∞ Reserve list; ‡ Restricted list; § Suspended list; † Temporarily inactive list; Roster updated May 17, 2026; Transactions; → More rosters: MiLB • Pacific Coast League; → Los Angeles Angels minor league players

=== Tacoma Rainiers ===
Tacoma Rainiers roster
Players	Coaches/Other
Pitchers: 58 Matt Brash * #; 31 Jhonathan Díaz; 14 Randy Dobnak; 33 Dane Dunning; 46 Nick Garcia; 47 Nick Hull; 45 Casey Lawrence; 38 Gunner Mayer; 10 Bryce Miller * #; 21 Gabe Mosser; 13 Robinson Ortiz *; 19 Houston Roth; 36 Michael Rucker; 34 Josh Simpson *; 59 Troy Taylor *; 37 Brendan White; 29 Cole Wilcox *; 25 Yosver Zulueta *; Catchers: 44 Brian O'Keefe; 27 Jakson Reetz; Infielders: 0 Ryan Bliss *; 35 Alejo López; 8 Brock Rodden; 1 Carson Taylor; 30 Hogan Windish; 16 Patrick Wisdom * #; Outfielders: 20 Brennen Davis; 10 Colin Davis; 4 Victor Labrada; 9 Spencer Packard; 3 Victor Robles * #; 2 Rhylan Thomas *	Manager: 7 John Russell; Coaches: 17 Mike McCarthy (pitching); 5 Eric Farris (bench); 60 Seth Mejias-Brean (hitting); 28 Jacob Nottingham (coach); 60-day injured list: 63 Austin Kitchen (full season); 7-day injured list; * On Seattle Mariners 40-man roster; ~ Development list; # Rehab assignment; ∞ Reserve list; ‡ Restricted list; § Suspended list; † Temporarily inactive list; Roster updated May 17, 2026; Transactions; → More rosters: MiLB • Pacific Coast League; → Seattle Mariners minor league players

== See also ==
- List of International League team rosters
