= Henry Báez =

Free agent
- Pitcher
- Born: October 12, 2002 (age 24); San Cristobal, Dominican Republic
- Bats: Left Throws: Left

Henry Manuel Báez (born October 12, 2002) is a Dominican professional baseball pitcher who is a free agent.

== Career ==
On July 2, 2019, Báez signed with the San Diego Padres as an international free agent. He did not play in a game in 2020 due to the cancellation of the minor league season because of the COVID-19 pandemic. Báez made his professional debut in 2021 with the Dominican Summer League Padres, posting a 4.25 ERA with 37 strikeouts over 12 games (10 starts).

Báez spent the 2022 season with the rookie–level Arizona Complex League Padres, making 9 appearances (7 starts) and logging a 1–4 record and 3.82 ERA with 41 strikeouts across 30 2/3 innings of work. He split 2023 between the Single–A Lake Elsinore Storm and High–A Fort Wayne TinCaps. In 21 games (18 starts) for the two affiliates, Báez registered a combined 7–3 record and 3.84 ERA with 99 strikeouts across 98 1/3 innings pitched.

Báez split the 2024 campaign between High–A Fort Wayne and the Double–A San Antonio Missions, compiling a 7–4 record and 2.99 ERA with 109 strikeouts across 129 1/3 innings pitched over 26 starts. He was subsequently named San Diego's minor league pitcher of the year. Following the season, the Padres added Báez to their 40-man roster to protect him from the Rule 5 draft.

Báez was optioned to the Triple-A El Paso Chihuahuas to begin the 2025 season, where he posted a 4-2 record and 1.96 ERA with 89 strikeouts over 20 starts.

On July 31, 2025, the Padres traded Báez, Eduarniel Núñez, and prospects Leo De Vries and Braden Nett to the Athletics in exchange for Mason Miller and JP Sears. He made three starts down the stretch for the Double-A Midland RockHounds, pitching to a 1-1 record and 5.84 ERA with 11 strikeouts across 12 1/3 innings pitched.

Báez was optioned to Double-A Midland to begin the 2026 season. In 14 starts with Double-A Midland Rockhounds he threw 53.1 innings going 1-8 with a 7.09 ERA and 51 strikeouts. On October 29, he was sent outright to Triple-A Las Vegas Aviators. He elected free agency on November 2.
