= List of Texas League team rosters =

Each of the 10 teams of Minor League Baseball's Texas League carry a 28-man active roster. Only these players are eligible to play.

Teams may have any number of inactive players on their rosters at a given time who do not count toward active roster limits. Injured players may be placed on the injured list (7-day or 60-day). The temporary inactive list and bereavement list are for players attending to personal matters. Major league players may be placed on rosters for injury rehabilitation for a maximum of 20 days for non-pitchers and 30 days for pitchers.

Players who are ineligible to play due to failure to adhere to the Minor League Drug Prevention and Treatment Program, violations of their contract, who are receiving team disciplinary action, or who are unable to join the team due to visa problems may be placed on the restricted or suspended lists. These players count against a team's active roster limit.

Each team usually has a three-man coaching staff including a manager, hitting coach, and pitching coach. Depending on each Major League Baseball organization's development approach, some teams may have additional coaches.

== North Division ==
=== Arkansas Travelers ===
Arkansas Travelers roster
Players	Coaches/Other
Pitchers: 37 Will Armbruester; 14 Ferny Barreda; 13 Tyler Cleveland; 41 Ty Cummings; 22 Ryan Hawks; 38 Michael Hobbs; 39 Lucas Kelly; 30 Jimmy Kingsbury; 18 Conor Larkin; 44 Adam Leverett; 17 Lael Lockhart; 28 Teddy McGraw; 14 Michael Morales; 21 Marcelo Perez; 43 Jason Ruffcorn; 26 Ryan Sloan; 19 Adam Smith; 29 Nico Tellache; 27 Sam Whiting; Catchers: 15 Josh Caron; 7 Connor Charping; 40 Boston Smith; Infielders: 9 Caleb Cali; 4 Felnin Celesten; 38 Carter Dorighi; 23 Hunter Fitz-Gerald; 5 Charlie Pagliarini; 16 Austin St. Laurent; Outfielders: 31 Anthony Donofrio; 8 Jonny Farmelo; 3 Bill Knight; 2 Sammy Siani; 20 Jared Sundstrom	Manager: 25 Rich Thompson; Coaches: 10 Jordan Cowan (hitting); 18 Cameron Ming (pitching); 36 Jose Umbria (bench); 10 Daniel Amaral (first base); 60-day injured list: 16 Jimmy Joyce; 7-day injured list; * On Seattle Mariners 40-man roster; ~ Development list; # Rehab assignment; ∞ Reserve list; ‡ Restricted list; § Suspended list; † Temporarily inactive list; Roster updated September 28, 2026; Transactions; → More rosters: MiLB • Texas League; → Seattle Mariners minor league players

=== Northwest Arkansas Naturals ===
Northwest Arkansas Naturals roster
Players	Coaches/Other
Pitchers: 32 Felix Arronde; 11 Drew Beam; 23 Zachary Cawyer; 40 Dennis Colleran; 28 Grant Gambrell; 26 Tyson Guerrero; 46 Chase Jessee; 61 Brandon Johnson; 25 Justin Lamkin; 57 Augusto Mendieta; 51 Tommy Molsky; 31 Caden Monke; 47 Andrew Morones; 17 Frank Mozzicato; 41 Shane Panzini; 12 Coleman Picard; 49 Oscar Rayo; 44 Anthony Simonelli; Catchers: 7 Angel Acosta; 27 Canyon Brown; 18 Ricson Gonzalez; 47 Hyungchan Um; Infielders: 3 Justin Johnson; 8 Sam Kulasingam; 2 Connor Rasmussen; 9 Daniel Vazquez; Outfielders: 13 Spencer Nivens; 6 Luke Pelzer	Manager: 22 Brooks Conrad; Coaches: 34 Larry Carter (pitching); 52 Chris Corbett (assistant hitting & coach); 15 Andy LaRoche (hitting); 43 Anthony Silkwood (assistant pitching); 60-day injured list: -- Nate Ackenhausen; 29 Christian Chamberlain; 7-day injured list; * On Kansas City Royals 40-man roster; ~ Development list; # Rehab assignment; ∞ Reserve list; ‡ Restricted list; § Suspended list; † Temporarily inactive list; Roster updated September 28, 2026; Transactions; → More rosters: MiLB • Texas League; → Kansas City Royals minor league players

=== Ozarks Springbirds ===
Ozarks Springbirds roster
Players	Coaches/Other
Pitchers: 30 Blake Aita; 47 Randel Clemente; 37 José Davila; 48 Braden Davis; 44 Nate Dohm; 19 Liam Doyle; 27 Daniel Eagen; 18 Yhoiker Fajardo; 41 Jack Findlay; 15 Tanner Franklin; 35 Joseph King; 46 Chen-Wei Lin; 28 Domenic Picone; 38 Darlin Saladin; 43 Nolan Sparks; 33 Michael Watson; 11 Christian Worley; Catchers: 52 Ryan Campos; 40 Chase Heath; 5 Cade McGee; 31 Rainiel Rodríguez; Infielders: 26 Jesús Báez; 29 Jon Jon Gazdar; 34 Jack Gurevitch; 16 Deniel Ortiz; 8 Tre Richardson III; Outfielders: 4 Won-Bin Cho; 12 Travis Honeyman; 21 Tai Peete; 50 Ian Petrutz; 7 Luis Pino; 3 Josiah Ragsdale	Manager: 22 Patrick Anderson; Coaches: 32 Luis Arenado (assistant); 36 Danny Black (bench); 39 Eric Peterson (pitching); 25 Elvis Rodriguez (hitting); 60-day injured list: -- Tyler Bradt; -- Mason Burns (full season); 7-day injured list; * On St. Louis Cardinals 40-man roster; ~ Development list; # Rehab assignment; ∞ Reserve list; ‡ Restricted list; § Suspended list; † Temporarily inactive list; Roster updated September 27, 2026; Transactions; → More rosters: MiLB • Texas League; → St. Louis Cardinals minor league players

=== Tulsa Drillers ===
Tulsa Drillers roster
Players	Coaches/Other
Pitchers: 41 Myles Caba; 24 Patrick Copen; 2 Wyatt Crowell; 3 Cam Day; 47 Aidan Foeller; 15 Luke Fox; 7 Roque Gutierrez; 5 Peter Heubeck; 32 Carson Hobbs; -- Jared Karros; 12 Jacob Kmatz; 39 Payton Martin; 99 Kevin Ramirez; 23 Zach Root; 35 Christian Ruebeck; 27 Adam Serwinowski; 17 Evan Shaw; 16 Christian Suarez; 18 Lucas Wepf; 26 Christian Zazueta; Catchers: -- Yeiner Fernandez; 23 Griffin Lockwood-Powell; -- Nelson Quiroz; 28 Frank Rodriguez; Infielders: 6 Jake Gelof; 14 Elijah Hainline; 21 Jose Izarra; 4 Sean McLain; 45 Sam Mongelli; -- Kyle Nevin; 30 Joe Vetrano; 11 Logan Wagner; 10 Taylor Young; Outfielders: 25 Charles Davalan; 1 Kendall George; 5 Kole Myers; 9 Eduardo Quintero	Manager: 22 Eric Wedge; Coaches: 20 Jose Capellan (bullpen catcher); -- Tyler DeJong (development); -- Blake Gailen (hitting); 31 Johan Garcia (bench); 34 Durin O'Linger (pitching); -- Jake Taylor (performance); 40 Ramón Troncoso (pitching); 55 Juan Zabala (bullpen catcher); 7-day injured list; * On Los Angeles Dodgers 40-man roster; ~ Development list; # Rehab assignment; ∞ Reserve list; ‡ Restricted list; § Suspended list; † Temporarily inactive list; Roster updated September 18, 2026; Transactions; → More rosters: MiLB • Texas League; → Los Angeles Dodgers minor league players

=== Wichita Turbo Tubs ===
Wichita Turbo Tubs roster
Players	Coaches/Other
Pitchers: 33 Sam Armstrong; 44 Spencer Bengard; 35 Kyle Bischoff; 16 Adrian Bohorquez; 24 Darren Bowen; 8 Hunter Gregory; 45 Preston Johnson; 38 Ty Langenberg; 43 Cory Lewis; 46 Mitch Mueller; 23 Jaylen Nowlin; 16 Jose Olivares; 39 Riley Quick; 51 Luis Quiñones; 18 Yehizon Sanchez; 41 Chris Vallimont; Catchers: 31 Andrew Cossetti; 13 Khadim Diaw; 19 Luis Hernandez; 26 Poncho Ruiz; Infielders: 11 Danny De Andrade; 9 Kyle DeBarge; 15 Marek Houston; 2 Quinn McDaniel; 25 Jay Thomason; Outfielders: 22 Graham Brown; 20 Jaime Ferrer; 21 Caden Kendle; 1 Garrett Spain; 17 Brandon Winokur	Manager: 32 Nico Giarratano; Coaches: 55 Andrew Cresci (hitting); 0 Julian Gonzalez (development); 47 Stephen Ridings (pitching); 27 Jesus Sanchez (pitching); 60-day injured list: -- Hunter Hoopes; 17 Eli Jones; 22 Caleb Roberts; 7-day injured list; * On Minnesota Twins 40-man roster; ~ Development list; # Rehab assignment; ∞ Reserve list; ‡ Restricted list; § Suspended list; † Temporarily inactive list; Roster updated September 21, 2026; Transactions; → More rosters: MiLB • Texas League; → Minnesota Twins minor league players

== South Division ==
=== Amarillo Sod Poodles ===
Amarillo Sod Poodles roster
Players	Coaches/Other
Pitchers: 43 Roman Angelo; 40 Wellington Aracena; 10 Joe Ariola; 24 Alec Baker; 27 Dawson Brown; 33 Billy Corcoran; 15 Brian Curley; 30 Josh Grosz; 31 David Hagaman; 28 Sawyer Hawks; 23 Will Mabrey; 38 Mason Marriott; 16 Antonio Menendez; 35 Logan Mercado; 14 Alfred Morillo; 11 Carlos Rey; 26 Junior Sanchez; 41 John West; Catchers: 29 Gavin Logan; 20 Carlos Virahonda; Infielders: 10 Jansel Luis; 13 Ben McLaughlin; 9 Danny Serretti; 12 Yassel Soler; 8 Cristofer Torin; 2 Jean Walters; Outfielders: 25 Avery Owusu-Asiedu; 1 Junior Franco; 7 Druw Jones; 3 Angel Ortiz	Manager: 22 Javier Colina; Coaches: -- Jaime Del Valle (bench); 18 Gaby Hernandez (pitching); -- Ronald Ramirez (bench); 45 Ty Wright (hitting); 60-day injured list: 16 Yordin Chalas (full season); 32 Hunter Cranton; -- Sean Harney (full season); 16 Jack Hurley; 31 Adonys Perez; 7-day injured list; * On Arizona Diamondbacks 40-man roster; ~ Development list; # Rehab assignment; ∞ Reserve list; ‡ Restricted list; § Suspended list; † Temporarily inactive list; Roster updated September 24, 2026; Transactions; → More rosters: MiLB • Texas League; → Arizona Diamondbacks minor league players

=== Corpus Christi Hooks ===
Corpus Christi Hooks roster
Players	Coaches/Other
Pitchers: 29 Amilcar Chirinos; 20 Ramsey David; 18 Nolan DeVos; 26 Trey Dombroski; 17 Brett Gillis; 27 Jose Guedez; 28 Cole Hertzler; 21 James Hicks; 17 Colby Langford; 19 Hudson Leach; 10 Andrew Marrero; 32 Max Martin; 23 Railin Perez; 33 Adam Shoemaker; 6 Andrew Taylor; 40 Alejandro Torres; 36 Alonzo Tredwell; 48 Derek True; Catchers: 13 Will Bush; 3 Walker Janek; -- Noah Miller; 25 Hemmanuel Rosario; Infielders: 5 Jax Biggers; 9 Marcus Brown; 12 Zach Daudet; 1 Yamal Encarnacion; 11 Brandon Forrester; 22 Alberto Hernandez; 15 Max Holy; 35 Jack Moss; 2 Alejandro Nunez; 43 Hector Salas; 30 Cameron Sisneros; 24 Drew Wyers; Outfielders: 25 Drew Brutcher; 4 Chase Call; 5 Anthony Huezo; 9 Joseph Sullivan; 1 Justin Thomas Jr.; 8 Tyler Whitaker	Manager: -- Ricky Rivera; Coaches: 45 Bobby Bell (hitting); -- Jeremy Cologna (development); -- Zach Wilkins (pitching); 7-day injured list; * On Houston Astros 40-man roster; ~ Development list; # Rehab assignment; ∞ Reserve list; ‡ Restricted list; § Suspended list; † Temporarily inactive list; Roster updated September 21, 2026; Transactions; → More rosters: MiLB • Texas League; → Houston Astros minor league players

=== Frisco RoughRiders ===
Frisco RoughRiders roster
Players	Coaches/Other
Pitchers: 19 Ismael Agreda; 22 Ben Anderson; 52 Jonathan Brand; 46 Zach Bryant; 43 Aidan Curry; 49 Joey Danielson; 30 J'Briell Easley; 57 Thomas Ireland; -- Eric Loomis; 28 Dylan MacLean; 40 Bryan Magdaleno; 33 D. J. McCarty; 20 Brock Porter; 61 Cole Stasio; 54 Blake Townsend; 23 Josh Trentadue; 14 Wily Villar; 67 Kai Wynyard; Catchers: 24 Ian Moller; 16 Malcolm Moore; 25 Juan Sulbaran; Infielders: 15 Arturo Disla; 56 Gleider Figuereo; 4 Luke Hanson; 18 Corey Joyce; 38 Rafe Perich; 12 Max Wagner; Outfielders: 8 Dylan Dreiling; 11 Keith Jones II; 2 Paxton Kling; 5 Marcus Lee Sang; 6 Yeison Morrobel	Manager: 21 Chad Comer; Coaches: 48 Jason Hart (hitting); 31 Jorge Hernandez (development); 47 Thomas St. Clair (pitching); 9 Jay Sullenger (development); 60-day injured list: -- Larson Kindreich (full season); -- Tucker Mitchell (full season); 7-day injured list; * On Texas Rangers 40-man roster; ~ Development list; # Rehab assignment; ∞ Reserve list; ‡ Restricted list; § Suspended list; † Temporarily inactive list; Roster updated October 1, 2026; Transactions; → More rosters: MiLB • Texas League; → Texas Rangers minor league players

=== Midland RockHounds ===
Midland RockHounds roster
Players	Coaches/Other
Pitchers: 40 Corey Avant; 49 Henry Báez *; 17 Diego Barrera; 19 A.J. Causey; 34 Micah Dallas; 23 Jay Dill; 25 Steven Echavarria; 39 Stevie Emanuels; 26 J.J. Goss; 45 Ben Hansen ~; 27 Kenya Huggins; -- Will Johnston; 32 Braden Nett *; 9 Blaze Pontes; 41 Domingo Robles; 18 Zane Taylor; 28 Shohei Tomioka; Catchers: 21 Shane McGuire; 15 CJ Rodriguez; 16 Logan Sauve; Infielders: 2 Euribiel Angeles; 13 Bobby Boser; 1 Ali Camarillo; 5 Brennan Milone; 3 C.J. Pittaro; 12 Jared Sprague-Lott; 10 Casey Yamauchi; Outfielders: 3 Nate Nankil; 8 Clark Elliott; 20 Cameron Leary; 14 Pedro Pineda	Manager: 31 Gregorio Petit; Coaches: 19 Gunnar Buhner (assistant hitting); -- Dave Burba (bullpen); 25 Juan Dilone (hitting); 6 Beau Taylor (coach); 60-day injured list: -- Mark Adamiak; 12 Leo De Vries; 22 Ryan Lasko; -- Edgar Sanchez; 7-day injured list; * On Athletics 40-man roster; ~ Development list; # Rehab assignment; ∞ Reserve list; ‡ Restricted list; § Suspended list; † Temporarily inactive list; Roster updated September 14, 2026; Transactions; → More rosters: MiLB • Texas League; → Athletics minor league players

=== San Antonio Missions ===
San Antonio Missions roster
Players	Coaches/Other
Pitchers: 34 Clay Edmondson; 9 Sadrac Franco; 29 Igor Gil; 33 Lucas Giolito; 18 Harry Gustin; 7 Jamie Hitt; 31 Bernard Jose; 30 Victor Lizarraga; 23 Josh Mallitz; 20 Carlos Medina; 25 Carson Montgomery; 6 Johan Moreno; 20 Tucker Musgrove; 19 Francis Peña; 9 Enmanuel Pinales; 21 Fernando Sanchez; 7 Will Varmette; 11 Eric Yost; Catchers: 28 Brendan Durfee; 66 Andy Thomas ‡; Infielders: 3 Francisco Acuna; 16 Jack Costello; 1 Justin DeCriscio; 10 Wyatt Hoffman; 13 Ryan Jackson; 33 Romeo Sanabria; 6 Carson Tucker; 8 Luis Verdugo; Outfielders: 14 Jake Cunningham; 22 Albert Fabian; 40 Alex McCoy; 27 Tirso Ornelas; 24 Kai Roberts	Manager: 26 Chris Tremie; Coaches: 17 Erick Abreu (pitching); 39 Brian Burres (bench); 44 Eric Del Prado (hitting); 60-day injured list: 14 Manuel Castro; 29 Omar Cruz (full season); 29 Ryan Och; -- Cole Paplham (full season); 9 Enmanuel Pinales (administrative leave); -- Jackson Smeltz; 7-day injured list; * On San Diego Padres 40-man roster; ~ Development list; # Rehab assignment; ∞ Reserve list; ‡ Restricted list; § Suspended list; † Temporarily inactive list; Roster updated September 19, 2026; Transactions; → More rosters: MiLB • Texas League; → San Diego Padres minor league players

== See also ==
- List of Eastern League team rosters
- List of Southern League team rosters
