= Corpus Christi Hooks =

- Founded in 1968 in Memphis, Tennessee; Based in Corpus Christi, Texas since 2005
Team logo
Cap insignia

Minor league affiliations
- Class: Double-A (2005–present)
- League: Texas League (2005–present)
- Division: South Division

Major league affiliations
- Team: Houston Astros (1991–present)
- Previous teams: New York Mets (1968–1990)

Minor league titles
- League titles (1): 2006
- Division titles (1): 2006
- First-half titles (5): 2006; 2013; 2015; 2016; 2018
- Second-half titles (3): 2012; 2013; 2018

Team data
- Name: Corpus Christi Hooks (2005–present)
- Previous names: Round Rock Express (2000–2004); Jackson Generals (1991–1999); Jackson Mets (1975–1990); Victoria Toros (1974); Memphis Blues (1968–1973)
- Ballpark: Whataburger Field (2005–present)
- Previous parks: Dell Diamond (2000–2004); Smith–Wills Stadium (1975–1999); Toro Stadium (1974); Blues Stadium (1968–1973)
- Owner/ Operator: Diamond Baseball Holdings (DBH)
- General manager: Brady Ballard
- Manager: Ricky Rivera
- Website: milb.com/corpus-christi

The Corpus Christi Hooks are a Minor League Baseball team of the Texas League and the Double-A affiliate of the Houston Astros. They are located in Corpus Christi, Texas, and are named for the city's association with fishing. The team is owned by the Houston Astros. The Hooks play their home games at Whataburger Field, which opened in 2005 and is located on Corpus Christi's waterfront.

== History ==
The history of the Hooks' franchise dates back to 1968, when it got its start in the Texas League as the Memphis Blues. That club won the league crown twice, in 1969 and 1973. In 1974, the franchise moved to Victoria, Texas and played in Toro Stadium, where it captured the league title in its lone season as the Toros. The following year, the club moved to Jackson, Mississippi where it would remain for the next 25 seasons, first as the Mets (1975–1990), then as the Generals (1991–1999). The franchise qualified for the playoffs 13 times and won the TL championship on five occasions (1981, 1984, 1985, 1993 and 1996). During the years 1980–1987, Jackson dominated the league, making it to eight consecutive post-seasons.

Hall of Famer Nolan Ryan and his group acquired the franchise following the 1998 season and moved it from Jackson to Round Rock in time for the 2000 season. The Round Rock Express, led by Morgan Ensberg and Roy Oswalt, powered their way to the Texas League title in that first season at The Dell Diamond. The Express, which shattered league attendance records throughout their five-year run, also qualified for post-season play in four of those five seasons.

=== The move to Corpus Christi ===
The move of the franchise from Round Rock to Corpus Christi following the 2004 season was made possible when the owners of the Express, Ryan Sanders Baseball, acquired the Triple-A franchise in Edmonton, Canada and announced their intention to move the club to Round Rock. That paved the way for the Double-A franchise to relocate to the Gulf Coast of Texas. In 2004 the organization held a "Name the Team" contest that sought suggestions from the community for a new name for the team. The contest was won by Corpus Christi resident, Michael Braly. The team's new name, Corpus Christi Hooks was born. The team's colors are white, red, and light blue, representing the ocean and sky of the popular South Texas fishing area. The team mascots are Sammy the Seagull and Rusty the Fish Hook.

=== 2006 championship team ===
One of the most exciting moments in the team's history was an appearance by Roger Clemens on June 11, 2006, as he prepared for his return to the Astros. Clemens' start attracted nationwide attention and a record crowd of 9,022. Clemens struck out 11 batters in 6 innings on his way to the victory. Tickets were being sold on eBay for up to $230.

On September 14, 2006, in a wild 5 hour, 14 inning marathon, the Corpus Christi Hooks eclipsed the Wichita Wranglers, 8–7, clinching the third and decisive game to defeat Wichita 3 games to 1 in the best of five series to win the 2006 Texas League Championship. This marked the first time a Corpus Christi franchise has won the TL Championship since the 1958 Corpus Christi Giants. Manager Dave Clark was named 2006 Texas League Manager of the Year and pitcher Matt Albers was named 2006 Texas League Pitcher of the Year.

=== Post-championship ===
On June 25, 2007, Whataburger Field played host to the 2007 installment of the Texas League All-Star Game. Seven Hooks players were invited to play on the squad. From 2005 to 2010, the Hooks graduated 29 players to the major leagues and had another 31 players with big-league experience wear the Corpus Christi uniform. From 2005 to 2010, a total of 163 men played for the Hooks.

In conjunction with Major League Baseball's restructuring of Minor League Baseball in 2021, the Hooks were organized into the Double-A Central. For the 2021 season, the Hooks played every Wednesday game as the "Corpus Christi Honey Butter Chicken Biscuits". Whataburger, which sponsors the team's ballpark, sells the Honey Butter Chicken Biscuit, and was founded in Corpus Christi. The uniforms resembled Whataburger's table tents. In 2022, the Double-A Central became known as the Texas League, the name historically used by the regional circuit prior to the 2021 reorganization.

In December 2025, the Houston Astros sold the team to Diamond Baseball Holdings.

== Notable Hooks who played in the major leagues ==
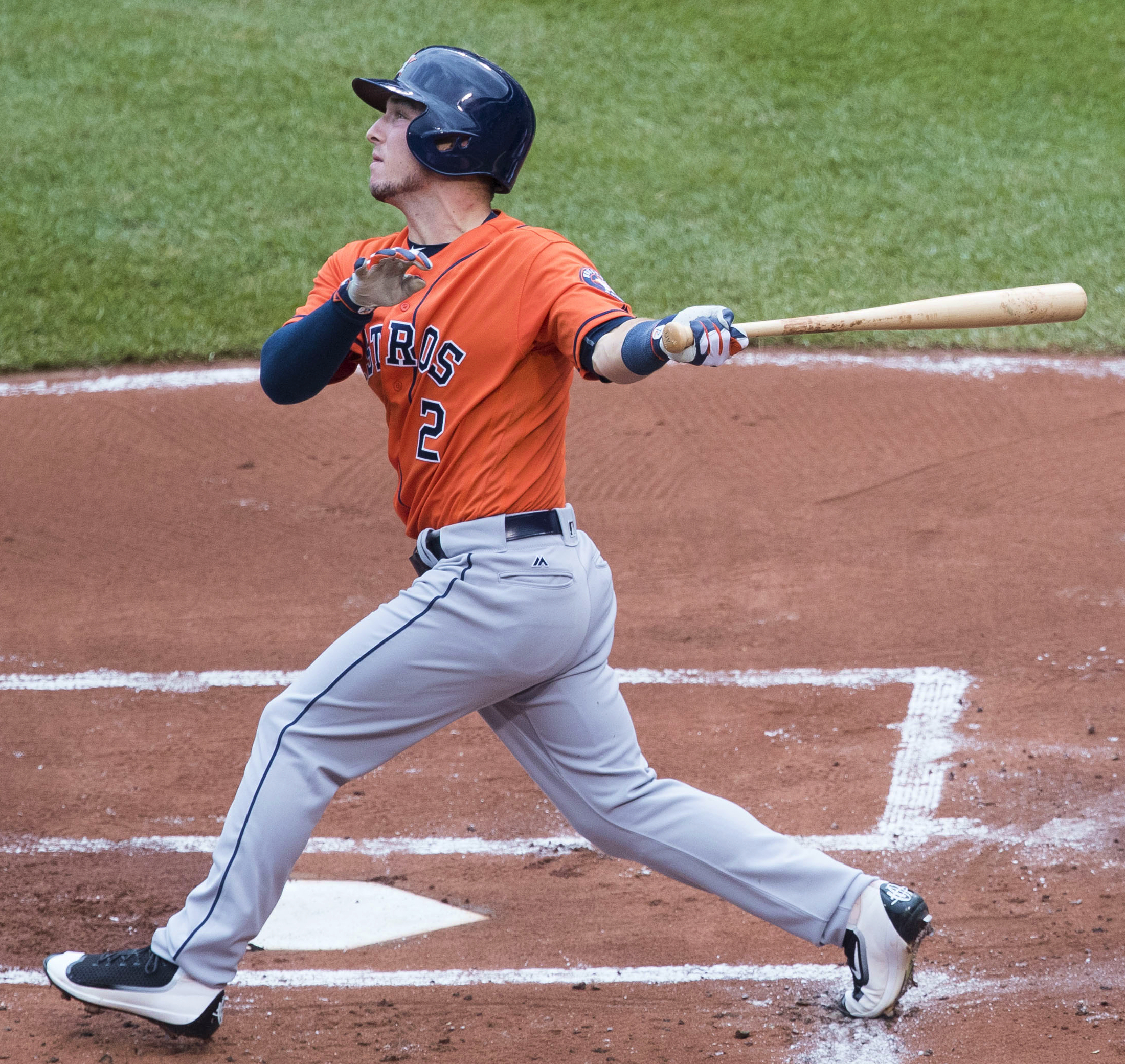
Alex Bregman

A number of Hooks players have been called up to the major leagues since the team has been in Corpus Christi. These include Charlton Jimerson, Héctor Giménez, J. R. House, Matt Albers, Fernando Nieve, Chris Sampson, Jason Hirsh, Hunter Pence, Jason Castro, Chris Johnson, Jose Altuve, Fernando Abad, Arcenio León, J. D. Martinez, Dallas Keuchel, Josh Zeid, Carlos Correa, Philip Barzilla, Alex Bregman, Garrett Stubbs, J. D. Davis, George Springer, and Yordan Alvarez.

== Roster ==
Corpus Christi Hooks roster
Players	Coaches/Other
Pitchers: 29 Amilcar Chirinos; 20 Ramsey David; 18 Nolan DeVos; 26 Trey Dombroski; 17 Brett Gillis; 27 Jose Guedez; 28 Cole Hertzler; 21 James Hicks; 17 Colby Langford; 19 Hudson Leach; 10 Andrew Marrero; 32 Max Martin; 23 Railin Perez; 33 Adam Shoemaker; 6 Andrew Taylor; 40 Alejandro Torres; 36 Alonzo Tredwell; 48 Derek True; Catchers: 13 Will Bush; 3 Walker Janek; -- Noah Miller; 25 Hemmanuel Rosario; Infielders: 5 Jax Biggers; 9 Marcus Brown; 12 Zach Daudet; 1 Yamal Encarnacion; 11 Brandon Forrester; 22 Alberto Hernandez; 15 Max Holy; 35 Jack Moss; 2 Alejandro Nunez; 43 Hector Salas; 30 Cameron Sisneros; 24 Drew Wyers; Outfielders: 25 Drew Brutcher; 4 Chase Call; 5 Anthony Huezo; 9 Joseph Sullivan; 1 Justin Thomas Jr.; 8 Tyler Whitaker	Manager: -- Ricky Rivera; Coaches: 45 Bobby Bell (hitting); -- Jeremy Cologna (development); -- Zach Wilkins (pitching); 7-day injured list; * On Houston Astros 40-man roster; ~ Development list; # Rehab assignment; ∞ Reserve list; ‡ Restricted list; § Suspended list; † Temporarily inactive list; Roster updated September 21, 2026; Transactions; → More rosters: MiLB • Texas League; → Houston Astros minor league players
