= JP Sears (baseball) =

American baseball player (born 1996)

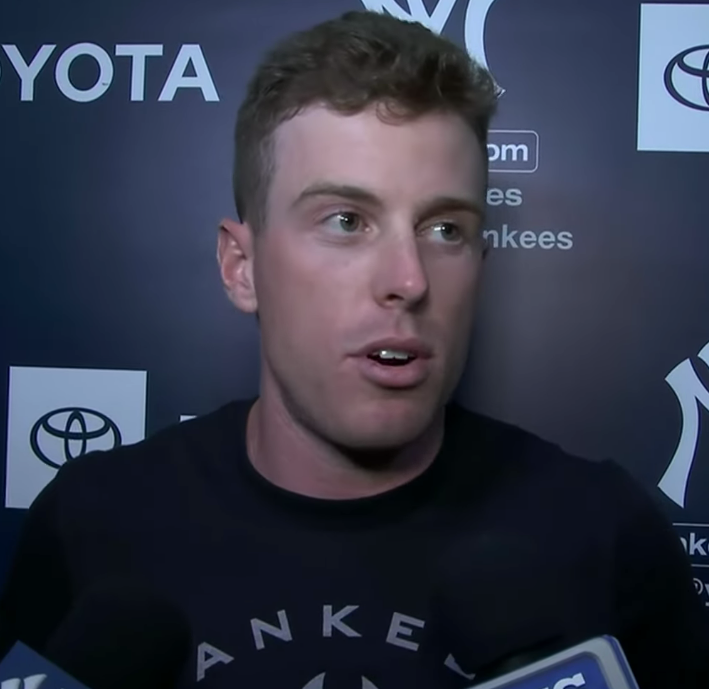
- Sears with the New York Yankees in 2022

Free agent
- Pitcher
- Born: February 19, 1996 (age 30); Sumter, South Carolina, U.S.
- Bats: Right Throws: Left

MLB debut
- April 13, 2022, for the New York Yankees

MLB statistics (through 2026 season)
- Win–loss record: 34–45
- Earned run average: 4.54
- Strikeouts: 491
- Stats at Baseball Reference

Teams
- New York Yankees (2022); Oakland Athletics / Athletics (2022–2025); San Diego Padres (2025–2026)

John Patrick Sears (born February 19, 1996) is an American professional baseball pitcher who is a free agent. He has previously played in Major League Baseball (MLB) for the New York Yankees, Oakland Athletics / Athletics, and San Diego Padres.

== Career ==
=== Seattle Mariners ===
Sears graduated from Wilson Hall, a private school in Sumter, South Carolina, and then attended The Citadel, where he played college baseball for The Citadel Bulldogs. He was selected by the Seattle Mariners in the 11th round of the 2017 Major League Baseball draft. He signed and spent his first professional season with the Everett AquaSox and the Clinton LumberKings, going 1–2 with a 0.65 ERA over 27 2/3 innings.

=== New York Yankees ===
On November 18, 2017, the Mariners traded Sears and Juan Then to the New York Yankees for Nick Rumbelow. He spent the 2018 season with the Charleston RiverDogs, starting ten games and going 1–5 with a 2.67 ERA with 54 strikeouts over 54 innings. In 2019, he pitched for the Tampa Tarpons and went 4–4 with a 4.07 ERA over 48 2/3 innings. He did not play a minor league game in 2020 due to the cancellation of the season. He split the 2021 season between the Somerset Patriots and the Scranton/Wilkes-Barre RailRiders, going 10–2 with a 3.46 ERA over 25 games (18 starts), striking out 136 batters over 104 innings.

The Yankees added Sears to their 40-man roster after the 2021 season. He made the Yankees Opening Day roster in 2022 and made his major league debut on April 13. Sears earned his first major league win on April 16, but was optioned to Scranton/Wilkes-Barre after the game.

=== Oakland Athletics ===
The Yankees traded Sears, Luis Medina, Ken Waldichuk, and Cooper Bowman to the Oakland Athletics for Frankie Montas and Lou Trivino on August 1, 2022. The Athletics assigned Sears to the Las Vegas Aviators and promoted him to the major leagues to make his first appearance for the Athletics on August 10. In 2023, Sears led the A's pitchers in games started (32), innings pitched (172 1/3), and strikeouts (161) while posting a 5-14 record and a 4.54 ERA.

After giving up nine runs across 9.1 innings in his first two starts of the 2024 season, Sears took a no-hitter into the 7th inning on April 11 against Texas. He ended up pitching 6 1/3 innings and striking out 5 batters in a 1-0 win. Sears made 32 total starts for Oakland, compiling an 11-13 record and 4.38 ERA with 137 strikeouts across 180 2/3 innings pitched.

Sears made 22 starts for the Athletics in the 2025 season, logging a 7-9 record and 4.95 ERA with 97 strikeouts over 111 innings of work.

=== San Diego Padres ===
On July 31, 2025, the Athletics traded Sears and Mason Miller to the San Diego Padres in exchange for Leo De Vries, Braden Nett, Henry Báez and Eduarniel Núñez. In his first appearance for the Padres on August 4, Sears allowed five runs on 10 hits with four strikeouts across five innings of work against the Arizona Diamondbacks. Sears was optioned to the Triple-A El Paso Chihuahuas the following day.

Sears was optioned to Triple-A El Paso to begin the 2026 season. On November 20, 2026, Sears was non-tendered by the Padres and became a free agent.
