= Eduarniel Núñez =

Dominican baseball player (born 1999)

Free agent
- Pitcher
- Born: June 7, 1999 (age 27); Samana, Dominican Republic
- Bats: Right Throws: Right

MLB debut
- July 2, 2025, for the San Diego Padres

MLB statistics (through 2025 season)
- Win–loss record: 1–0
- Earned run average: 7.11
- Strikeouts: 11
- Stats at Baseball Reference

Teams
- San Diego Padres (2025); Athletics (2025)

Eduarniel Núñez (born June 7, 1999) is a Dominican professional baseball pitcher who is a free agent. He has previously played in Major League Baseball (MLB) for the San Diego Padres and Athletics.

== Career ==
=== Chicago Cubs ===
On March 15, 2017, Núñez signed with the Chicago Cubs as an international free agent, and made his professional debut with the Dominican Summer League Cubs. He made 10 starts for the rookie-level Arizona League Cubs in 2018, registering a 1–3 record and 3.19 ERA with 39 strikeouts across 36 2/3 innings pitched. Núñez spent the 2019 campaign with the Low-A Eugene Emeralds, struggling to a 1–5 record and 6.93 ERA with 38 strikeouts in 37 2/3 innings pitched across 15 appearances (nine starts).

Núñez did not play in a game in 2020 due to the cancellation of the minor league season because of the COVID-19 pandemic. He returned to action in 2021 with the Single-A Myrtle Beach Pelicans and High-A South Bend Cubs. In 35 appearances split between the two affiliates, Núñez compiled a 1–4 record and 4.17 ERA with 50 strikeouts and five saves across 45 1/3 innings pitched. Núñez split the 2022 season between South Bend and the Double-A Tennessee Smokies, logging a cumulative 5–5 record and 4.53 ERA with 57 strikeouts and four saves across 41 appearances out of the bullpen.

In 2023, Núñez returned to the South Bend and Tennessee, and made 38 total relief appearances, accumulating a 3–1 record and 3.11 ERA with 61 strikeouts and one save across 46 1/3 innings pitched. On July 6, 2023, while playing with South Bend, Núñez, Michael Arias, Jarod Wright, and Frankie Scalzo Jr. combined to no-hit the Peoria Chiefs. A minor league free agent after the season, Núñez re-signed with Chicago on a new minor league contract on November 8.

Núñez split the 2024 season between Double-A Tennessee and the Triple-A Iowa Cubs, accumulating a 9–3 record and 3.28 ERA with 64 strikeouts and five saves across 46 total appearances. He elected free agency following the season on November 4, 2024.

=== San Diego Padres ===
On November 6, 2024, Núñez signed a minor league contract with the San Diego Padres organization. He began the 2025 season with the Double-A San Antonio Missions before being promoted to the Triple-A El Paso Chihuahuas in June. Núñez made seven scoreless appearances for El Paso, recording one win, two saves, and 11 strikeouts across 7 1/3 innings pitched.

On July 1, 2025, the Padres announced that Núñez would be promoted to the major leagues for the first time to start a game in the team's doubleheader against the Philadelphia Phillies the following day. In four appearances for San Diego, he recorded a 3.86 ERA with two strikeouts across 4 2/3 innings of work.

=== Athletics ===
On July 31, 2025, Núñez, along with Leo De Vries, Braden Nett, and Henry Baez were traded to the Athletics in exchange for Mason Miller and JP Sears. On August 26, Núñez recorded his first career win, recording the final out of an extra-inning victory over the Detroit Tigers. In six total appearances for the team, he logged a 1–0 record and 9.00 ERA with nine strikeouts spanning eight innings of work.

Núñez was optioned to the Triple-A Las Vegas Aviators to begin the 2026 season. In 12 appearances split between Las Vegas and the Double-A Midland RockHounds, he accumulated a 1–0 record and 4.61 ERA with 17 strikeouts across 13 2/3 innings pitched. On May 12, 2026, Núñez was designated for assignment by the Athletics.

=== Baltimore Orioles ===
On May 15, 2026, the Athletics traded Núñez to the Baltimore Orioles in exchange for cash considerations. In five appearances for the Triple-A Norfolk Tides, he struggled to an 0–1 record and 15.75 ERA with four strikeouts across four innings pitched. Núñez was designated for assignment by the Orioles on June 4.

=== Chicago Cubs (second stint) ===
On June 8, 2026, Núñez was claimed off of waivers by the Chicago Cubs. He made two scoreless appearances for the rookie-level Arizona Complex League Cubs, recording five strikeouts over two innings of work. Núñez was designated for assignment by Chicago on June 24. He cleared waivers and was sent outright to the Triple-A Iowa Cubs on July 1. He elected free agency on November 2.
