= Mason Miller =

American baseball player (born 1998)

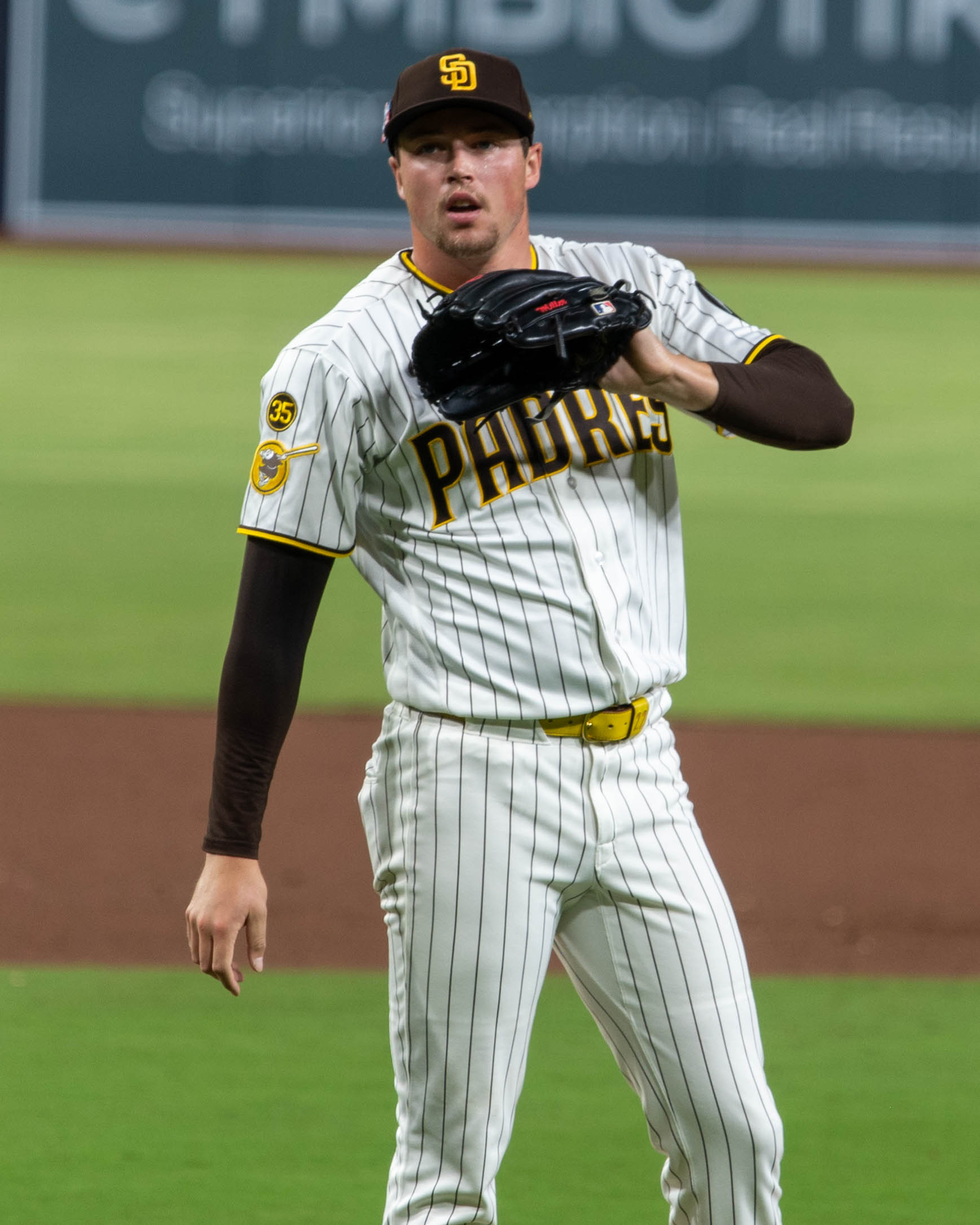
- Miller pitching for the San Diego Padres in 2026

San Diego Padres – No. 22
- Pitcher
- Born: August 24, 1998 (age 28); Pittsburgh, Pennsylvania, U.S.
- Bats: Right Throws: Right

MLB debut
- April 19, 2023, for the Oakland Athletics

MLB statistics (through 2026 season)
- Win–loss record: 8–9
- Earned run average: 2.47
- Strikeouts: 375
- Saves: 88
- Stats at Baseball Reference

Teams
- Oakland Athletics / Athletics (2023–2025); San Diego Padres (2025–present)

Career highlights and awards
- 2× All-Star (2024, 2026); All-MLB First Team (2026); BBWAA NL Reliever of the Year (2026); MLB NL Reliever of the Year (2026); NL saves leader (2026); Pitched an immaculate inning on September 3, 2025
Medals
Men's baseball
Representing the United States
World Baseball Classic
Silver medal – second place	2026 Miami	Team

Mason James Miller (born August 24, 1998), nicknamed "the Reaper", is an American professional baseball pitcher for the San Diego Padres of Major League Baseball (MLB). He has previously played in MLB for the Oakland Athletics / Athletics. He made his MLB debut in 2023, and was an All-Star selection in 2024 and 2026.

== Amateur career ==
Miller played for Bethel Park High School in Bethel Park, Pennsylvania, while being homeschooled, and played college baseball at Waynesburg University for four years until he graduated. He then played for Gardner-Webb University for his fifth year as a graduate student. As a sophomore at Waynesburg, he was diagnosed with Type 1 diabetes.

== Professional career ==
=== Oakland Athletics / Athletics ===
==== Minor leagues ====
The Oakland Athletics selected Miller in the third round of the 2021 Major League Baseball draft. He made his professional debut that year with the Arizona Complex League Athletics. In 2022, Miller pitched in only six games between the ACL Athletics, Lansing Lugnuts and Las Vegas Aviators. After the season, he played in the Arizona Fall League.

Miller began the 2023 season with the Double-A Midland RockHounds, starting one game for the team before being moved up to Triple-A Las Vegas. After one start in Triple-A, on April 18, 2023, with 11 strikeouts over 5 perfect innings, the Athletics announced that Miller would be promoted to the major leagues for the first time.

==== 2023 ====
Miller made his debut a day later, April 19, 2023, in a game against the Chicago Cubs. He pitched 4 1/3 innings, allowing two runs on four hits, a walk, and five strikeouts. Miller also became the 10th starting pitcher since the debut of Statcast to throw 15 pitches above 100 miles per hour (160 km/h). After a May 8 start against the Kansas City Royals, it was reported that Miller was dealing with elbow tightness. He was later diagnosed with a mild sprain of the ulnar collateral ligament in his throwing elbow and promptly shut down from throwing. On June 30, he was transferred to the 60-day injured list. On September 6, Miller was activated from the injured list, with manager Mark Kotsay noting that he would be slated for a relief role. Miller finished the 2023 season with a 3.78 ERA in 10 games, six of which were starts.

==== 2024: Rookie season & All-Star ====
In an effort to maintain Miller's health, the A's announced that Miller would be a reliever during the 2024 season. Beginning the season as the team's closer, Miller earned his first career save in a 4–3 win at Texas on April 9. Miller was named AL Reliever of the Month for April after earning eight saves in eight opportunities with 28 total strikeouts.

On July 7, 2024, Miller was named as a reserve player in the 2024 All-Star Game, having recorded a 2.39 ERA with 14 saves and 66 strikeouts (leading all AL relievers) up to that point. During the All-Star Game, Miller recorded a scoreless fifth inning with two strikeouts, ultimately earning the win as the American League beat the National League 5–3. During that inning he threw the fastest pitch in All-Star Game history, a 103.6 MPH fastball to Trea Turner.

On September 26, 2024, Miller became the last pitcher to throw a pitch at the Oakland Coliseum in a major league game. He closed out the 3–2 victory over the Texas Rangers with a groundout from Travis Jankowski, recording his 28th save of the year, and the franchises' final win in Oakland. During this outing, Miller set the new franchise record for saves recorded by a rookie with 28, and threw the fastest pitch in Oakland Coliseum history, at 103.8 MPH.

Miller finished the 2024 season with a 2.49 ERA, 28 saves, and 104 strikeouts across 55 games. He was named to the All-MLB Second Team, and finished fourth in AL Rookie of the Year voting.

==== 2025 ====
On April 12, 2025, Miller recorded the Athletics' first save at Sutter Health Park in Sacramento, after throwing a scoreless 9th inning to close out a 3–1 victory over the New York Mets. Miller recorded a 3.76 ERA with 20 saves and 59 strikeouts across 38 games for the Athletics in 2025.

=== San Diego Padres ===
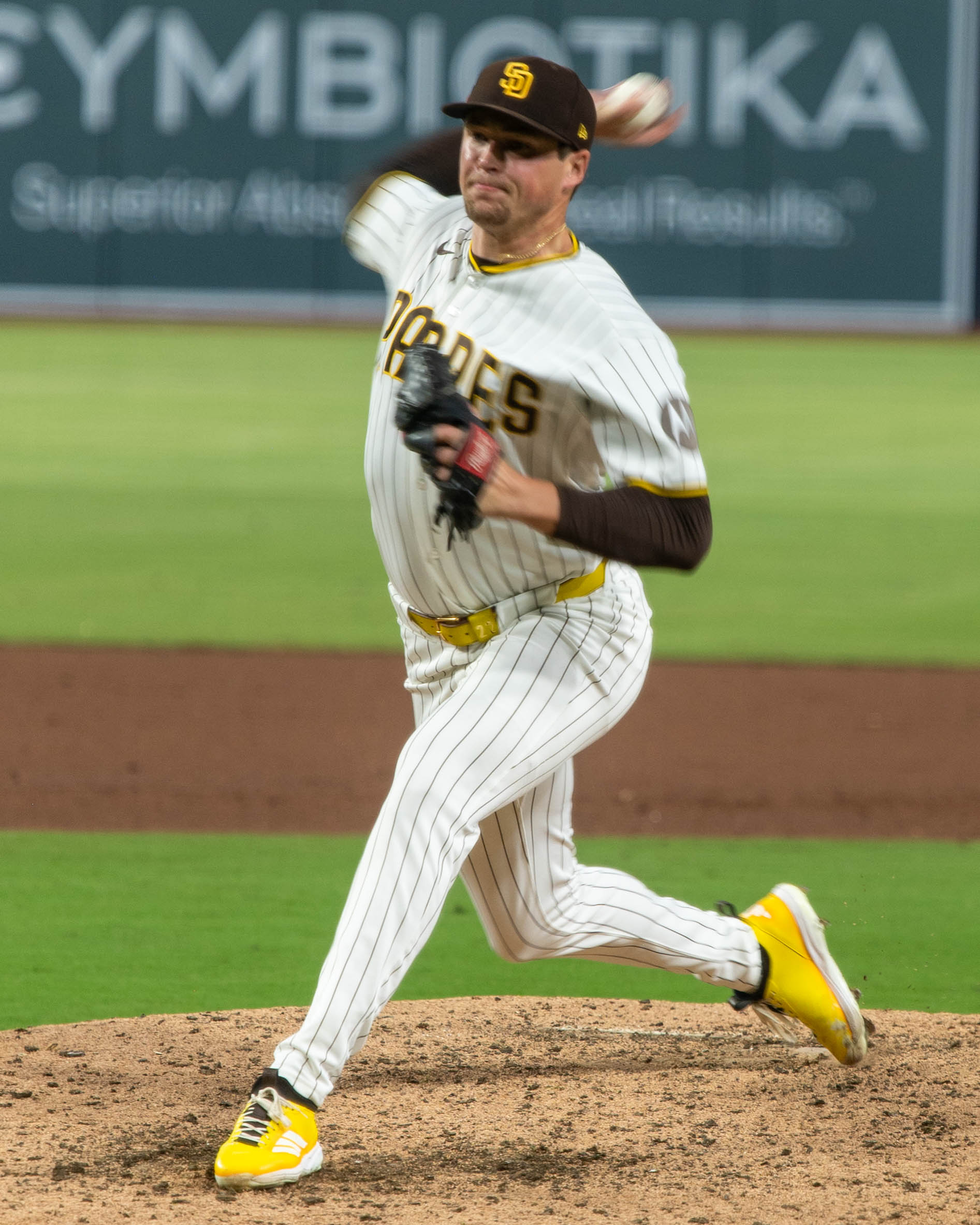
Miller throwing a pitch for the Padres in 2026.

On July 31, 2025, the Athletics traded Miller and JP Sears to the San Diego Padres in exchange for Leo De Vries, Braden Nett, Eduarniel Núñez and Henry Baez. On August 6, Miller recorded his first save as a Padre, striking out all three batters in the 9th inning to close out a 3–2 victory over the Arizona Diamondbacks. On September 3, in the eighth inning versus the Baltimore Orioles, Miller became just the second Padre to pitch an immaculate inning, striking out Jeremiah Jackson, Ryan Mountcastle, and Emmanuel Rivera, on nine consecutive sliders. Miller was named NL Reliever of the Month for the month of September, after pitching to a 0.00 ERA with 26 strikeouts, a 0.49 WHIP and a .027 opponents' average across 11 appearances.

Miller ended his year with the Padres with a 0.77 ERA, two saves in three opportunities, and 45 strikeouts in 23 1/3 innings. Miller finished the 2025 season with a 2.63 ERA, 22 saves, and 104 strikeouts across 60 games between the Athletics and Padres.

In Game 1 of the 2025 NL Wild Card Series against the Chicago Cubs, Miller made his first postseason appearance, striking out all three batters in the seventh inning. The Cubs won the game 3–1.

==== 2026: NL saves leader ====
Against the Arizona Diamondbacks on April 25, 2026, Miller broke the Padres team record for consecutive scoreless innings, set 20 years earlier by Cla Meredith with 33 2/3 shutout innings in 2006. Miller's streak dated back to August 2025, when he allowed a run in his second appearance with the Padres. His streak ended at 34 2/3 against Chicago on April 27 after he allowed two runs in a non-save situation. It was the eighth-longest streak by an MLB relief pitcher since the expansion era began in 1961.

Miller was named NL Reliever of the Month for the month of April, after pitching to a 1.17 ERA with 29 strikeouts, a 0.59 WHIP and a .118 opponents’ average, while recording 10 saves. On May 19, Miller suffered his first loss as a Padre and his first loss in his career since May 17, 2025 while with the Athletics. Despite the loss, Miller was named Reliever of the Month for May, after pitching to a 0.00 ERA with 20 strikeouts, a 1.24 WHIP and a .118 opponents’ average, while recording seven saves.

On July 4, Miller was selected as the Padres' sole representative at the 2026 All-Star Game, having recorded a 0.78 ERA and an NL-leading 21 saves up to that point. During the All-Star Game, Miller faced only one batter, Munetaka Murakami, who he struck out on four 100+ MPH fastballs. Miller's dominance continued through July when he was named Reliever of the Month for the third time that season (and fifth in his career), after pitching to a 0.82 ERA with 19 strikeouts, a 0.64 WHIP, and a .135 opponents’ average, while recording seven saves.

Miller finished the 2026 season with 38 saves in 41 save opportunities along with a 1.67 ERA and a career-high 129 strikeouts across 70 innings. He led the NL with 38 saves (tied with Riley O'Brien of St. Louis) and had a 4.8 WPA across 57 games finished. He allowed a run in just 12 of 66 appearances.

On September 30, Miller earned the first postseason save of his career after pitching a scoreless ninth inning to close out Game 2 of the 2026 NL Wild Card Series and sweep the Chicago Cubs. In game 2 of the NL Division Series, he surrendered a game-winning two-run single to Jackson Chourio with two outs in the ninth inning in a 4–3 loss to the Milwaukee Brewers. Miller threw 12 pitches in the eight inning, striking out two, and retired the first batter in the ninth on two pitches before loading the bases on three walks, his first career postseason walks. It was the first time all season that he walked more than two batters. It would have been his third six-out appearance of the season and his first six-out save since 2024. He threw a season-high 40 pitches, his most since 2023. After Game 2, Miller was placed on the postseason paternity list, awaiting the birth of his child, and missed Game 3 as a result. He returned to pitch one inning in Game 4, which the Padres lost, ending their season. In three 2026 postseason games, Miller recorded a 0–1 record with a 4.91 ERA, five strikeouts, and one save across 3 2/3 innings.

On November 11, Miller was the unanimous winner of Baseball Writers' Association of America's inaugural NL Reliever of the Year Award. He was also named the Trevor Hoffman NL Reliever of the Year.

== Personal life ==
Miller is a Christian. He is married to Jordan Miller. They have a son together, who was born on October 7, 2026. He is an Eagle Scout. He grew up as a fan of the Pittsburgh Pirates.

Awards and achievements
Preceded by Clay Holmes	American League Reliever of the Month; April 2024	Succeeded by Emmanuel Clase
Preceded by Raisel Iglesias; Himself; Himself; Jhoan Durán	National League Reliever of the Month; September 2025; April 2026; May 2026; July 2026	Succeeded by Himself; Himself; Jhoan Durán; Trevor Megill
