= Houston Astros minor league players =

This a partial list of Minor League Baseball players in the Houston Astros system and the rosters of their minor league affiliates.

== Players ==
=== Kevin Alvarez ===
Kevin Alvarez

Houston Astros
- Outfielder
- Born: January 13, 2008 (age 18); Colón, Cuba
- Bats: Left Throws: Left

Kevin Reynaldo Alvarez (born January 13, 2008) is a Cuban professional baseball outfielder in the Houston Astros organization.

Alvarez was born in Cuba and left in 2021 to live in the Dominican Republic. He was rated among the top international prospects in the 2025 class and signed with the Houston Astros in January 2025. He made his professional debut that year with the Dominican Summer League Astros.

Alvarez started the 2026 season with the Fayetteville Woodpeckers.

- Career statistics from Baseball Reference (Minors)

=== Trey Dombroski ===
Trey Dombroski

Houston Astros
- Pitcher
- Born: March 13, 2001 (age 25); Manasquan, New Jersey, U.S.
- Bats: Right Throws: Left

Howard Joseph Dombroski (born March 13, 2001) is an American professional baseball pitcher in the Houston Astros organization. He played college baseball for the Monmouth Hawks.

Dombroski grew up in Manasquan, New Jersey and attended Wall High School. He was named the NJ.com Pitcher of the Year as a senior.

Dombroski's freshman season was cut short by COVID-19. As a sophomore, he went 5-1 with a 2.73 ERA. After the season, Dombroski played for the Harwich Mariners of the Cape Cod Baseball League and was named the league Pitcher of the Year. As a junior, he was named the MAAC Pitcher of the Year.

Dombroski was selected in the fourth round in the 2022 Major League Baseball draft by the Houston Astros. He signed with the Astros on July 23, 2022, and received a $443,900 signing bonus.

- Career statistics from Baseball Reference (Minors)
- Monmouth Hawks bio

=== Cole Hertzler ===
Cole Hertzler

Houston Astros
- Pitcher
- Born: June 21, 2003 (age 23); Reading, Pennsylvania, U.S.
- Bats: Right Throws: Right

Cole Garrett Hertzler (born June 21, 2003) is an American professional baseball pitcher in the Houston Astros organization.

Hertzler attended Boyertown High School in Boyertown, Pennsylvania and played college baseball at Liberty University. He was selected by the Houston Astros in the fourth round of the 2024 Major League Baseball draft.

Hertzler made his professional debut in 2024 with the Fayetteville Woodpeckers and played 2025 with them. He started 2026 Asheville Tourists before being promoted to the Corpus Christi Hooks.

- Career statistics from Baseball Reference (Minors)

=== Anthony Huezo ===
Anthony Huezo

Houston Astros
- Outfielder
- Born: November 2, 2005 (age 21); Palmdale, California, U.S.
- Bats: Left Throws: Right

Anthony Huezo (born November 2, 2005) is an American professional baseball outfielder in the Houston Astros organization.

Huezo attended Etiwanda High School in Rancho Cucamonga, California. He was selected by the Houston Astros in the 12th round of the 2023 Major League Baseball draft. He made his professional debut that year with the Florida Complex League Astros.

Huezo played 2024 with the FCL Astros and appeared in seven games with the Asheville Tourists and one game with the Corpus Christi Hooks. He played 2025 with the FCL Astros, Fayetteville Woodpeckers and two games with the Sugar Land Space Cowboys. After the season, he played for the Sydney Blue Sox in the Australian Baseball League.

Huezo started 2026 with Fayetteville before being promoted to Asheville and Corpus Christi.

- Career statistics from Baseball Reference (Minors)

=== Michael Knorr ===
Michael Knorr

Houston Astros
- Pitcher
- Born: May 12, 2000 (age 26); Princeton, New Jersey, U.S.
- Bats: Right Throws: Right

Michael Jacob Knorr (born May 12, 2000) is an American professional baseball pitcher in the Houston Astros organization.

Knorr attended Carlsbad High School in Carlsbad, California. He was selected by the San Diego Padres in the 40th round of the 2018 Major League Baseball draft, but did not sign. He played three years of college baseball at California State University, Fullerton before transferring to Coastal Carolina University in 2022.

After one year at Coastal Carolina, Knorr was selected by the Houston Astros in the third round of the 2022 Major League Baseball draft. He signed with the Astros and spent his first professional season in 2023 with the Fayetteville Woodpeckers and Asheville Tourists. He started 2024 with the Corpus Christi Hooks.

- Career statistics from Baseball Reference (Minors)
- Cal State Fullerton Titans bio
- Coastal Carolina Chanticleers bio

=== Bryan Magdaleno ===
Bryan Magdaleno

Houston Astros
- Pitcher
- Born: February 22, 2001 (age 25); Santo Domingo, Dominican Republic
- Bats: Left Throws: Left

Bryan Magdaleno (born February 22, 2001) is a Dominican professional baseball pitcher in the Houston Astros organization.

Magdaleno signed as an international free agent with the Texas Rangers organization on August 23, 2019. He did not make his professional debut in 2020 due to the cancellation of the Minor League Baseball season due to the reaction to the COVID-19 pandemic. He was assigned to the DSL Rangers of the Rookie-level Dominican Summer League for his professional debut season of 2021, going 0–2 with a 2.95 ERA and 35 strikeouts over 36 2/3 innings. He spent the 2022 season with the ACL Rangers of the Rookie-level Arizona Complex League, going 1–1 with a 4.12 ERA and 18 strikeouts over 19 2/3 innings. He split the 2023 season between the ACL and the Down East Wood Ducks of the Low-A Carolina League, going a combined 1–1 with a 7.13 ERA and 27 strikeouts over 17 2/3 innings. Magdaleno split the 2024 season between Down East, the Hickory Crawdads of the High-A South Atlantic League, and the Frisco RoughRiders of the Double-A Texas League, going a combined 6–3 with a 1.27 ERA and 68 strikeouts over 42 2/3 innings. He was named the Texas Rangers 2024 Reliever of the Year. On November 2, 2026, Magdaleno elected free agency. On November 17, he signed with the Houston Astros organization.

- Career statistics from MLB · Baseball Reference (Minors)

=== Bryce Mayer ===
Bryce Mayer

Houston Astros
- Pitcher
- Born: February 11, 2002 (age 24); Washington, Missouri, U.S.
- Bats: Right Throws: Right

Bryce Matthew Mayer (born February 11, 2002) is an American professional baseball pitcher in the Houston Astros organization.

Mayer attended St. Francis Borgia High School in Washington, Missouri and played college baseball at St. Charles Community College and the University of Missouri. He was selected by the Houston Astros in the 16th round of the 2024 Major League Baseball draft.

Mayer made his professional debut in 2024 with the Fayetteville Woodpeckers. He started 2025 with Fayetteville and was promoted to the Asheville Tourists and Corpus Christi Hooks during the season.

- Career statistics from Baseball Reference (Minors)

=== Jackson Nezuh ===
Jackson Nezuh

Houston Astros
- Pitcher
- Born: February 11, 2002 (age 24); Augusta, Georgia, U.S.
- Bats: Right Throws: Right

Jackson Thomas Nezuh (born February 11, 2002) is an American professional baseball pitcher in the Houston Astros organization.

Nezuh attended TNXL Academy in Ocoee, Florida and played college baseball at Florida State University for two seasons before transferring to University of Louisiana at Lafayette. In 2022, he played collegiate summer baseball with the Brewster Whitecaps of the Cape Cod Baseball League. After one year at Louisiana, he was selected by the Houston Astros in the 14th round of the 2023 Major League Baseball draft.

Nezuh made his professional debut in 2024 with the Fayetteville Woodpeckers and ended the season with the Asheville Tourists. He started 2025 with the Corpus Christi Hooks.

- Career statistics from Baseball Reference (Minors)
- Florida State Seminoles bio
- Louisiana Ragin' Cajuns bio

=== Evan Reifert ===
Evan Reifert

Houston Astros
- Pitcher
- Born: May 14, 1999 (age 27); Wilton, Iowa, U.S.
- Bats: Right Throws: Right

Evan Matthew Reifert (born May 14, 1999) is an American professional baseball pitcher in the Houston Astros organization.

Reifert played college baseball at North Iowa Area Community College. He was drafted by the Texas Rangers in the 30th round of the 2018 MLB draft, but did not sign and returned to North Iowa. In 2020, he transferred to the University of Central Missouri.

Reifert went unselected in the 2020 Major League Baseball draft and signed with the Milwaukee Brewers. He did not play in a game in 2020 due to the cancellation of the minor league season because of the COVID-19 pandemic. Reifert spent his first professional season in 2021 with the Carolina Mudcats and Wisconsin Timber Rattlers, accumulating a 3-3 record and 2.10 ERA with 103 strikeouts and 8 saves in 60 innings over 37 games.

On November 13, 2021, the Brewers traded him to the Tampa Bay Rays in exchange for Mike Brosseau. Reifert spent the 2022 season with the rookie-level Florida Complex League Rays, High-A Bowling Green Hot Rods and Double-A Montgomery Biscuits. In 31 appearances out of the bullpen for the three affiliates, he accumulated a 7-2 record and 4.58 ERA with 62 strikeouts across 37 1/3 innings pitched. After the season, he played in the Arizona Fall League.

Reifert only pitched 7 2/3 innings split between Bowling Green and the FCL Rays in 2023, missing the majority of the season with right shoulder inflammation. He spent the 2024 season with Double-A Montgomery, registering a 1.96 ERA with 65 strikeouts in 41 1/3 innings pitched across 35 appearances.

On December 11, 2024, Reifert was selected by the Washington Nationals fifth overall in the Rule 5 draft. On March 18, 2025, Reifert was returned to the Rays organization. He made 53 appearances for the Triple-A Durham Bulls, posting a 2-2 record and 2.48 ERA with 51 strikeouts and five saves over 29 innings of work.

On October 31, 2026, Reifert was traded to the Houston Astros in exchange for cash considerations.

- Career statistics from Baseball Reference (Minors)

=== Alex Santos ===
Alex Santos

Houston Astros
- Pitcher
- Born: February 10, 2002 (age 24); New York, New York, U.S.
- Bats: Right Throws: Right

Alex Zavier Santos (born February 10, 2002) is an American professional baseball pitcher in the Houston Astros organization.

Santos grew up in The Bronx and attended Mount Saint Michael Academy. He had committed to play college baseball at Maryland.

Santos was selected in the 2nd round of the 2020 MLB draft by the Houston Astros. He signed with the team and received a $1.25 million signing bonus. Santos spent the 2021 season with the Fayetteville Woodpeckers of the Low-A East and posted a 2–2 record with a 3.46 ERA and 48 strikeouts in 41 2/3 innings pitched.

- Career statistics from Baseball Reference (Minors)

=== Jason Schiavone ===
Jason Schiavone

Houston Astros
- Catcher
- Born: March 19, 2003 (age 23); Baltimore, Maryland, U.S.
- Bats: Right Throws: Right

Jason Christopher Schiavone (born March 19, 2003) is an American professional baseball catcher in the Houston Astros organization.

Schiavone attended St. John's College High School in Washington, D.C. and played college baseball at James Madison University (JMU). He was selected by the Houston Astros in the 11th round of the 2024 Major League Baseball draft.

Schiavone made his professional debut in 2024 with the Fayetteville Woodpeckers and played 2025 with Fayetteville and Asheville Tourists. He started 2026 with Asheville before being promoted to the Corpus Christi Hooks.

- Career statistics from Baseball Reference (Minors)

=== Joseph Sullivan ===
Joseph Sullivan

Houston Astros
- Outfielder
- Born: July 1, 2002 (age 24); Birmingham, Alabama, U.S.
- Bats: Left Throws: Left

Patrick Joseph Sullivan III (born July 1, 2002) is an American professional baseball outfielder in the Houston Astros organization.

Sullivan attended Vestavia Hills High School in Vestavia Hills, Alabama, where he played baseball. As a senior in 2021, he hit .402 with thirty RBIs. After graduating, he enrolled at the University of South Alabama where he played college baseball for the Jaguars. As a sophomore in 2023, he played in 52 games and batted .304 with 13 home runs, 44 RBIs, and twenty stolen bases. Sullivan missed time during his junior season due to a wrist injury, but still started 38 games and hit .266 with nine home runs and 32 RBIs. After the season, he was selected by the Houston Astros in the seventh round of the 2024 Major League Baseball draft.

Sullivan signed with the Astros for $239,900. After signing, he made his professional debut with the Fayetteville Woodpeckers, hitting .250 with five doubles over twenty games. Sullivan was a non-roster invitee to 2025 spring training, and hit Houston's first home run of the spring. He was assigned to the Asheville Tourists to open the 2025 season. In July, he was promoted to the Corpus Christi Hooks. Over 106 games between the two teams, Sullivan hit .220 with 17 home runs, 49 RBIs, and 42 stolen bases. He was assigned to play in the Arizona Fall League with the Scottsdale Scorpions after the season. Sullivan was assigned to Corpus Christi for the 2026 season. Over 80 games, he batted .221 with 11 home runs, 38 RBIs, and 20 stolen bases while missing time due to injury.

Sullivan's grandfather, Pat Sullivan, won the 1971 Heisman Trophy.

- Career statistics from Baseball Reference (Minors)
- South Alabama Jaguars bio

=== Alonzo Tredwell ===
Alonzo Tredwell

Houston Astros
- Pitcher
- Born: May 8, 2002 (age 24); Marblehead, Massachusetts, U.S.
- Bats: Left Throws: Right

Alonzo Slote Tredwell III (born May 8, 2002) is an American professional baseball pitcher in the Houston Astros organization.

Tredwell was born in Marblehead, Massachusetts, but moved to Orange County, California at the age of five. He grew up in Coto de Caza, California attended Mater Dei High School in Santa Ana, California. He played college baseball for the UCLA Bruins. In Tredwell's freshman season, he pitched in 47 innings, posting a 2.11 ERA, and 62 strikeouts, leading to him being named a consensus Freshman All-American and earning All-Pac 12 honors. In 2022 Tredwell had a bit of a step down pitching a 3.57 ERA and 51 strikeouts against only 12 walks in 45 and 1/3 innings. Then in 2023 Tredwell started in nine games, having a 3.57 ERA.

Tredwell was drafted by the Houston Astros in the second round with the 61st pick of the 2023 Major League Baseball draft. On July 18, 2023, he signed with the Astros for $1,497,500.

- Career statistics from MLB · Baseball Reference (Minors)
- UCLA Bruins bio

== Full Triple-A to Rookie League rosters ==
=== Triple-A ===
Sugar Land Space Cowboys roster
Players		Coaches/Other
Pitchers: -- Jose Gonzalez; 54 Michael Knorr; -- Bryan Magdaleno; 26 Joey Mancini; 39 Bryce Mayer; 27 Trey McLoughlin; 37 Brandon McPherson; 11 Alex Santos II; 21 Nic Swanson	Catchers: 24 Jason Schiavone; Infielders: 4 Trevor Austin; 3 Pascanel Ferreras; 12 Garret Guillemette; Outfielders: -- Joey Loperfido; -- Jake Meyers	Manager: 17 Mickey Storey; Coaches: 28 Sean Buchanan (pitching); 19 Drew Saylor (hitting); 1 Wladimir Sutil (development); 7-day injured list; * On Houston Astros 40-man roster; ~ Development list; # Rehab assignment; ∞ Reserve list; ‡ Restricted list; § Suspended list; † Temporarily inactive list; Roster updated November 17, 2026; Transactions; → More rosters: MiLB • Pacific Coast League; → Houston Astros minor league players

=== Double-A ===
Corpus Christi Hooks roster
Players		Coaches/Other
Pitchers: 29 Amilcar Chirinos; 20 Ramsey David; 18 Nolan DeVos; 26 Trey Dombroski; 17 Brett Gillis; 27 Jose Guedez; 28 Cole Hertzler; 21 James Hicks; 17 Colby Langford; 19 Hudson Leach; 10 Andrew Marrero; 32 Max Martin; 23 Railin Perez; 6 Andrew Taylor; 40 Alejandro Torres; 36 Alonzo Tredwell; 48 Derek True	Catchers: 13 Will Bush; 3 Walker Janek; -- Noah Miller; 25 Hemmanuel Rosario; Infielders: 9 Marcus Brown; 12 Zach Daudet; 1 Yamal Encarnacion; 11 Brandon Forrester; 22 Alberto Hernandez; 15 Max Holy; 35 Jack Moss; 2 Alejandro Nunez; 43 Hector Salas; 30 Cameron Sisneros; 24 Drew Wyers; Outfielders: 25 Drew Brutcher; 4 Chase Call; 5 Anthony Huezo; 9 Joseph Sullivan; 1 Justin Thomas Jr.; 8 Tyler Whitaker	Manager: -- Ricky Rivera; Coaches: 45 Bobby Bell (hitting); -- Jeremy Cologna (development); -- Zach Wilkins (pitching); 7-day injured list; * On Houston Astros 40-man roster; ~ Development list; # Rehab assignment; ∞ Reserve list; ‡ Restricted list; § Suspended list; † Temporarily inactive list; Roster updated November 2, 2026; Transactions; → More rosters: MiLB • Texas League; → Houston Astros minor league players

=== High-A ===
Asheville Tourists roster
Players		Coaches/Other
Pitchers: 41 Jhoster Baez; 90 Juan Bello; 19 Anthony Cruz; 15 Francisco Frias; 17 Dylan Howard; 22 Kellan Oakes; 26 Joan Ogando; 27 Javier Perez; 29 Nick Potter; 41 Raimy Rodriguez; 2 Yeriel Santos; 32 Grayson Saunier; 35 Parker Smith; 31 Jose Varela; 8 Jackson Wells; -- Nico Zeglin	Catchers: 13 John Garcia; 14 Yosweld Vasquez; Infielders: 3 Narbe Cruz; 12 Nick Monistere; 23 Xavier Neyens; 9 Brandon Nigh; 7 Caden Powell; 1 Kyle Walker; Outfielders: 8 Jadyn Fielder; 16 Ethan Frey; 16 Kenni Gomez; 8 Cesar Hernandez; 21 DJ Newman; 37 Nehomar Ochoa Jr.	Manager: 25 Nate Shaver; Coaches: 19 T. J. Burgmann (hitting); -- Josiah Hissong (development); -- Craig Prince (pitching); 7-day injured list; * On Houston Astros 40-man roster; ~ Development list; # Rehab assignment; ∞ Reserve list; ‡ Restricted list; § Suspended list; † Temporarily inactive list; Roster updated November 2, 2026; Transactions; → More rosters: MiLB • South Atlantic League; → Houston Astros minor league players

=== Single-A ===
Fayetteville Woodpeckers roster
Players		Coaches/Other
Pitchers: 43 Luis Aguilar; 77 Adrian Ardines; 44 Jagger Beck; 45 Tazwell Butler; 18 Jesus Carrera; 75 John Carver; 0 Brandon Cassedy; 77 Joey Dixon; 46 Carson Estridge; 21 Juan Fraide; 11 Cole MacRae; -- Julio Marte; 38 Ryan Mathiesen; -- Juan Nunez; 30 Gabel Pentecost; 36 Jank Pichardo; 26 Leomar Rosario; 39 Jose Serrano; 30 Aubrey Smith; 41 Brady Thomas; 47 Mick Uebelhor; 17 Ryan Verdugo; 66 Charlie Weber	Catchers: 20 Carlos Cauro; 35 Luis De Leon; 99 Arturo Flores; 16 Rashawn Galloway; Infielders: 6 Camilo Diaz; 19 Kam Durnin; 16 Curtis Hebert; 27 Waner Luciano; 4 Aaron Piasecki; 3 German Ramirez; 8 Petey Soto Jr.; 43 Ben Tryon; Outfielders: 10 Kevin Alvarez; 7 Logan Hughes; 11 Owen Nowak; 28 Juan Sierra; 1 Josh Wakefield	Manager: 29 Carlos Lugo; Coaches: 14 Tanner Montgomery (development); 23 Steve Serratore (hitting); 15 James Wiseman (pitching); 7-day injured list; * On Houston Astros 40-man roster; ~ Development list; # Rehab assignment; ∞ Reserve list; ‡ Restricted list; § Suspended list; † Temporarily inactive list; Roster updated November 2, 2026; Transactions; → More rosters: MiLB • Carolina League; → Houston Astros minor league players

=== Rookie ===
Florida Complex League Astros roster
Players		Coaches/Other
Pitchers: -- Michael Addari; 9 Luis Amador; -- Antony Aparicio; 37 Miguel Balza; -- Bryan Carney; -- Gavin Eddy; -- Peyton Fiene; -- Ryan Forcucci; -- Wes Mendes; 38 Juan Mieses; 20 Ismael Obregon; 21 Angel Peralta; 54 Ryan Petrovitch; -- Jack Radel; -- Porfirio Ramos	Catchers: 6 August Cuneo; 18 Jase Mitchell; -- Alexi Quiroz; Infielders: 1 Anderson Areinamo; 11 Landon Arroyos; -- Keon Johnson; 63 Pablo Martinez; -- Beau Peterson; 22 Juan Rojas; Outfielders: -- Bryce Boettcher ‡; 8 Elijah Farley; 30 Ariel Lebron; -- Ryan Pruitt; 12 Roiner Quintana; 17 Luis Rives; 15 Ethan Wagner	Manager: -- Vincent Blue; Coaches: -- Alejandro Martinez (development); -- Luis Alfredo Ramirez (pitching); -- Rene Rojas (hitting); -- Brandon Van Horn (hitting); 7-day injured list; * On Houston Astros 40-man roster; ~ Development list; # Rehab assignment; ∞ Reserve list; ‡ Restricted list; § Suspended list; † Temporarily inactive list; Roster updated November 2, 2026; Transactions; → More rosters: MiLB • Florida Complex League; → Houston Astros minor league players

=== Foreign Rookie ===
Dominican Summer League Astros Blue roster
Players		Coaches/Other
Pitchers: 12 Angel Alcantara; 20 Frederi Altagracia; -- Jairo Bautista; 51 Lemins Bens; 52 Ronieel Cabreja; 11 David Colina; 26 Omar Damian; 62 Axel De Lira; 54 Antonio Delgado; 0 Allen Garcia; 53 Kelvin Herrera; 39 Joel Jiminez; 17 Jorman Santana; 15 Kevin Santana; 65 Sebastian Saud; 30 Thomas Sveyda; 27 Victor Vizcaya	Catchers: 16 Andy Gonzalez; 19 Jesus Teran; Infielders: 8 Randy Arias; 9 Christian Colon; 4 Eric Mota; Outfielders: 14 Imanol Feliz; 18 Brayan Mendez; 1 Esteban Romero; 28 Yuaxander Silveira; 31 Jack Valbrune	Manager: -- Johe Acosta; Coaches: -- Rick Aponte (pitching); -- Selin Aquino (coach); -- Humberto Miranda (development); -- Starlyng Sanchez (pitching); -- Angel Tejeda (hitting); 7-day injured list; * On Houston Astros 40-man roster; ~ Development list; # Rehab assignment; ∞ Reserve list; ‡ Restricted list; § Suspended list; † Temporarily inactive list; Roster updated November 16, 2026; Transactions; → More rosters: MiLB • Dominican Summer League; → Houston Astros minor league players

Dominican Summer League Astros Orange roster
Players		Coaches/Other
Pitchers: 45 Angel Brito; 74 Dennisom Carrera; 20 Antony Constanza; 39 Vismar Dagnino; -- Anthony Gantes; 15 Isaias Harvey; 22 Victor Jimenez; 27 Adrianyer Lopez; 36 Dahel Lopez; 0 Deiby Marrero; 43 Antonio Morales; 23 Leonel Murrieta; 0 Ender Nunez; 29 Cesar Pastrano; 38 Emilio Payro; 45 William Perez; 37 Juan Ramirez; 41 Miguel Reyes; 30 Cristian Ron; 26 Jesus Sosa; 18 Samil Valdivieso; 62 Maximiliano Villanueva	Catchers: 14 Jeans Carrizalez; -- Esteban Castro; 13 Ire Garcia; 21 Emilio Gonzalez; 17 Alexander Huerta; 4 Fraimy Sanchez; Infielders: 29 Albert Fermín; 18 Santiago Martinez; 28 Sebastian Mendez; 35 Oscar Rivas; 3 Sami Manzueta; 3 Franchely Silverio; Outfielders: 9 Yensi De La Cruz; 16 Edwilmin Matos; 44 Anthony Millan; 57 Freddy Ramos; 37 Carlos Sandoval	Manager: -- Carlos Canelon; Coaches: -- Alfredo Angarita (development); -- Jervic Chavez (pitching); -- Angel Tejeda (hitting); 7-day injured list; * On Houston Astros 40-man roster; ~ Development list; # Rehab assignment; ∞ Reserve list; ‡ Restricted list; § Suspended list; † Temporarily inactive list; Roster updated November 3, 2026; Transactions; → More rosters: MiLB • Dominican Summer League; → Houston Astros minor league players
