= Stockton Ports =

- Founded in 1941; Stockton, California
Team logo
Cap insignia

Minor league affiliations
- Class: Single-A (2021–present)
- Previous classes: Class A-Advanced (1990–2020); Class A (1978–1989)
- League: California League (1941–present)
- Division: North Division

Major league affiliations
- Team: Oakland Athletics / Athletics (2005–present)
- Previous teams: Texas Rangers (2003–2004); Cincinnati Reds (2001–2002); Milwaukee Brewers (1979–2000); Seattle Mariners (1978); California Angels (1972-1977); Baltimore Orioles (1959–1971); St. Louis Cardinals (1958); Chicago Cubs (1953–1957); St. Louis Browns (1952); Chicago White Sox (1941-1951)

Minor league titles
- League titles (11): 1946; 1947; 1963; 1965; 1969; 1980; 1986; 1990; 1992; 2002; 2008
- Wild card berths (1): 2026

Team data
- Name: Stockton Ports (1946–1972, 1978–1999, 2002–present)
- Previous names: Mudville Nine (2000–2001); Stockton Mariners (1978); Stockton Flyers (1941–1942)
- Colors: Red, white, blue
- Mascot: Splash
- Ballpark: Banner Island Ballpark (2005–present)
- Previous parks: Billy Hebert Field (1941–2004)
- Owner/ Operator: Tom Volpe / 7th Inning Stretch LLC
- General manager: Jordan Feneck
- Manager: Darryl Kennedy
- Media: KWSX 1280 AM – MiLB.TV (currently select away games only)
- Website: milb.com/stockton

The Stockton Ports are a Minor League Baseball team of the California League and the Single-A affiliate of the Athletics. They are located in Stockton, California, and are named for the city's seaport. The team plays its home games at Banner Island Ballpark, which opened in 2005 and seats over 5,000 people.

The Ports were established in 1941 as members of the California League and have won the California League championship 11 times.

== History ==
Baseball first came to Stockton in the 1860s. At the time, Stockton fielded a team in an earlier incarnation of the California League. In 1888, the Stockton team won the California League pennant with a record of 41–12. That same team also gained a bit of notoriety as a possible inspiration for "Casey at the Bat", a famous baseball poem by Ernest Thayer. Thayer was a journalist for the San Francisco Examiner at the time and the games were hosted in a ballpark on Banner Island, a place once known as Mudville.

The Stockton Flyers were established as a charter member of the California League in 1941. The league suspended operations in June 1942 due to World War II. The Flyers were rechristened as the Stockton Ports to recognize Stockton's status as an inland port city when the league resumed operations in 1946. That season, the Ports went on to win their first California League pennant.

In 1947, the Ports won the California League title again without a major league affiliation (they had a limited working agreement with the Pacific Coast League's Oakland Oaks). After going 24–18 through June 4, they went on a 26-game winning streak and took first place, never to relinquish again in that season. The win streak is one of the longest in professional baseball and is still a California League record. The Ports finished that season with a record of 95–45 and 16 games ahead of the two teams tied for second place. During Minor League Baseball's centennial celebration in 2001, baseball historians Bill Weiss and Marshall Wright rated the 1947 Ports as one of the 100 greatest minor league teams of all time, ranked at number 98.

Owned by Stockton local Carl W. Thompson, Sr. (1971–1973), the Ports disbanded after the 1972 season, coming back as an affiliate of the Seattle Mariners in 1978. The Ports began a long affiliation with the Milwaukee Brewers the following year. The Ports had the best winning percentage in Minor League Baseball in the 1980s. In homage to the team in the Ernest Thayer poem, the Ports were renamed the Mudville Nine in 2000 and 2001, then returned to the Ports name in 2002.

In 2005, the Ports moved to the newly built Banner Island Ballpark and became affiliates of the Oakland Athletics. The team won its 11th California League championship in 2008 with a 9–3 victory over the Lancaster JetHawks on September 14.

In Major League Baseball's reorganization of Minor League Baseball in 2021 and assumption of control from the historic league offices, the Ports were assigned to the Low-A West at the Low-A classification along with most of the historic California League. In 2022, the MLB-controlled leagues reassumed their historic names, including the once-again California League, and the Low-A classification was renamed Single-A.

== Major league affiliations ==
- 1941: Los Angeles Angels, PCL
- 1946: Independent
- 1947–1948: Oakland Oaks, PCL
- 1949: Chicago White Sox, AL
- 1950–1951: Independent
- 1952: St. Louis Browns, AL
- 1953–1954: Chicago Cubs, NL
- 1955: Oakland Oaks, PCL
- 1956–1957: Baltimore Orioles, AL
- 1958: St. Louis Cardinals, NL
- 1959–1971: Baltimore Orioles, AL
- 1972: California Angels, AL
- 1978: Seattle Mariners, AL
- 1979–2000: Milwaukee Brewers, AL (1979–1997)/NL (1998–2000)
- 2001–2002: Cincinnati Reds, NL
- 2003–2004: Texas Rangers, AL
- 2005–present Oakland Athletics / Athletics, AL

== Roster ==
Stockton Ports roster
| Players | Coaches/Other |
|---|---|
| Pitchers: 22 Wilfred Alvarado; 26 Tyler August; 20 Alex Barr; 14 Corey Braun; 12 Kade Brown; 40 Colin Fitzgerald; 22 Blake Hammond; 25 Jackson Holmes; 18 Dominic Mauro; 44 Cole Miller; 14 Josnier Parra; 23 Mason Patel; 17 Jackson Phipps; 46 Grant Richardson; 34 Josiah Romeo; 19 Itsuki Takemoto; 9 Donny Troconis; Catchers: 33 Ramon Landaeta; 21 Alex Sosa; Infielders: 13 Bryan Andrade; 3 Michael Brooks; 5 Bjay Cooke; 37 Max Durrington; 29 Alex Hernandez; 10 Roman Martin; 38 Edgar Montero; 8 Shotaro Morii; 7 Ben Newton; Outfielders: 27 Bobby Blandford; 4 Drew Burress; 15 Jose Ramos; 1 Gavin Turley | Manager: -- Darryl Kennedy; Coaches: -- Cooper Goldby (hitting); 35 Jim Gott (pitching); -- Jose Ortiz (hitting); 60-day injured list: -- Bryson McArn; 40 Robert Puason; 11 Sam Stuhr; 7-day injured list; * On Athletics 40-man roster; ~ Development list; # Rehab assignment; ∞ Reserve list; ‡ Restricted list; § Suspended list; † Temporarily inactive list; Roster updated September 4, 2026; Transactions; → More rosters: MiLB • California League; → Athletics minor league players |

== Notable Ports alumni ==
Baseball Hall of Fame alumni

- Pat Gillick (1959) inducted 2011
- Mike Piazza (2007) inducted 2016

Notable alumni

- Joe Altobelli (1969) Manager of 1983 World Champion Baltimore Orioles
- Don Baylor (1968) MLB All-Star; 1995 NL Manager of the Year; 1979 AL Most Valuable Player
- Bo Belinsky (1959) pitched a no-hitter in 1962.
- Paul Blair (1963) 2-time MLB All-Star; 8-time Gold Glove winner
- Bruce Bochte (1972) MLB All-Star
- Dallas Braden (2005) Threw a perfect game in 2010.
- Milton Bradley (2005) MLB All-Star
- Al Bumbry (1969) MLB All-Star; 1973 AL Rookie of the Year
- Trevor Cahill (2008) MLB All-Star
- Coco Crisp (2015) 2011 AL stolen base champion
- Bobby Crosby (2005) 2004 AL Rookie of the Year
- Vince DiMaggio (1948) 2 x MLB All-Star
- Josh Donaldson 3 x MLB All-Star; 2015 AL Most Valuable Player
- Sean Doolittle (2008, 2012, 2015, 2017) MLB All-Star
- Keith Foulke (2008) MLB All-Star and Rolaids Relief Man award winner
- Sonny Gray (2017) 3 x MLB All-Star
- Bobby Grich (1968) 6 x MLB All-Star
- Dave Henderson (1978) MLB All-Star
- Geoff Jenkins (1995) MLB All-Star
- Davey Johnson (1962) 4 x MLB All-Star; 2 x MLB Manager of the Year; Manager of 1986 World Series Champion New York Mets
- Doug Jones (1979) MLB All-Star
- Darold Knowles (1962) MLB All-Star
- Dave May (1963) MLB All-Star
- Jim Morris (1987) Subject of the movie The Rookie
- Juan Nieves (1982) pitched a no-hitter in 1987
- Jerry Remy (1972) MLB All-Star
- Addison Russell (2013–2014) MLB All-Star
- Ben Sheets (1999) 4 x MLB All-Star
- Gary Sheffield (1987) 9 x MLB All Star; 1992 NL batting champion
- Kurt Suzuki (2005) MLB All-Star
- Fernando Vina (1997) MLB All-Star, 2 x Gold Glove winner
- Edison Volquez (2004) MLB All-Star, pitched a no-hitter in 2016
- Ben Zobrist (2015) 3 x MLB All-Star; 2016 World Series Most Valuable Player

== See also ==
- Stockton Ports players
- Mudville Nine players
