= Athletics minor league players =

List of baseball players

Below are selected minor league players and the rosters of the minor league affiliates of the Athletics Major League Baseball team:

== Players ==
=== Euribiel Angeles ===
Euribiel Angeles

Athletics
- Infielder
- Born: May 11, 2002 (age 24); Higuey, Dominican Republic
- Bats: Right Throws: Right

Euribiel Angeles (born May 11, 2002) is a Dominican professional baseball infielder in the Athletics organization.

Angeles signed with the San Diego Padres as an international free agent in 2018. He made his professional debut in 2019 with the Dominican Summer League Padres. In 2021 he played for the Lake Elsinore Storm and Fort Wayne TinCaps.

On April 3, 2022, Angeles, along with Adrián Martínez, was traded to the Oakland Athletics for Sean Manaea.

- Career statistics from Baseball Reference (Minors)

=== A.J. Causey ===
A.J. Causey

Athletics
- Pitcher
- Born: November 19, 2002 (age 24); Huntsville, Alabama, U.S.
- Bats: Right Throws: Right

Anthony Jordan Causey (born November 19, 2002) is an American professional baseball pitcher in the Athletics organization.

Causey attended Sparkman High School in Harvest, Alabama, where he played on the school's baseball team as a pitcher and infielder. He earned All-State honors as a senior in 2021. He went unselected in the 2021 Major League Baseball draft and enrolled at Jacksonville State University to play college baseball.

Causey played the 2022 and 2023 seasons with Jacksonville State, posting a 2.61 ERA as a reliever in 2022 and a 5.07 ERA as a starter in 2023. In both the summers of 2022 and 2023, he played in the Cape Cod Baseball League with the Falmouth Commodores. After his sophomore season at Jacksonville State, he transferred to the University of Tennessee to play college baseball with the Tennessee Volunteers. Over 19 appearances for Tennessee in 2024, Causey went 13–3 with a 4.43 ERA and 125 strikeouts over 91 1/3 innings, helping the Volunteers win the 2024 Men's College World Series. After the season, he was selected by the Kansas City Royals in the fifth round of the 2024 Major League Baseball draft. He signed with the team for $477,500.

Causey made his professional debut in 2025 with the Quad Cities River Bandits. In July, he was promoted to the Northwest Arkansas Naturals. Over 48 relief appearances between the two teams, Causey went 11–5 with a 1.72 ERA and 75 strikeouts over 73 1/3 innings. He was assigned to play in the Arizona Fall League with the Surprise Saguaros after the season.

On February 12, 2026, the Royals traded Causey to the Athletics in exchange for Mitch Spence. He was assigned to the Midland RockHounds to open the 2026 season and also played with the Las Vegas Aviators. Over 45 relief appearances between both teams, Causey had a 3–5 record, a 5.04 ERA, and 52 strikeouts across 50 innings.

- Career statistics from Baseball Reference (Minors)
- Jacksonville State Gamecocks bio
- Tennessee Volunteers bio

=== Cole Conn ===
Cole Conn

Athletics
- Catcher
- Born: July 11, 2001 (age 25); Belleville, Illinois, U.S.
- Bats: Switch Throws: Right

Colton Lloyd Conn (born July 11, 2001) is an American professional baseball catcher in the Athletics organization.

Conn played college baseball at the University of Illinois Chicago. He was selected by the Oakland Athletics in the 12th round of the 2023 Major League Baseball draft. The Athletics added him to their 40-man roster after the 2026 season.

- Career statistics from Baseball Reference (Minors)

=== Max Durrington ===
Max Durrington

Athletics
- Second baseman / Outfielder
- Born: February 13, 2007 (age 19); Tweed Heads, Australia
- Bats: Left Throws: Right

Max Aston Durrington (born February 13, 2007) is an Australian professional baseball second baseman and outfielder in the Athletics organization.

In July 2024, Durrington signed with the Oakland Athletics.

Durrington represented the Australia national team at the 2026 World Baseball Classic.

His father is former baseball player, Trent Durrington.

- Career statistics from Baseball Reference (Minors)

=== Colby Halter ===
Colby Halter

Athletics
- Second baseman / Third baseman
- Born: August 24, 2001 (age 25); Jacksonville, Florida, U.S.
- Bats: Left Throws: Right

Colby Matthew Halter (born August 24, 2001) is an American professional baseball second baseman and third baseman in the Athletics organization.

Halter played college baseball for the Florida Gators from 2021 to 2023. In 2022, he played collegiate summer baseball with the Falmouth Commodores of the Cape Cod Baseball League, batting .307/.407/.507 in 140 at bats with 22 runs (8th in the league), 7 doubles (10th), 7 home runs (leading the league), 12 stolen bases (9th), and 21 walks (5th).

He was selected by the Oakland Athletics in the 17th round of the 2023 Major League Baseball draft, signing for a $125,000 signing bonus. In 2023, playing for the Lansing Lugnuts and the ACL Athletics, he batted .272/.366/.351 in 114 at bats.

In 2024, playing primarily for Lansing with one at bat for the ACL Athletics, he batted .256/.367/.363 in 234 at bats. In 2025, playing for the Los Vegas Aviators and Midland Rockhounds, he batted .260/.352/.408 in 439 at bats with 8 triples, and 28 stolen bases in 32 attempts.

Halter represented the Israel national team at the 2026 World Baseball Classic.

- Career statistics from Baseball Reference (Minors)

=== Brennan Milone ===
Brennan Milone

Athletics
- First baseman / Outfielder
- Born: May 6, 2001 (age 25); Marietta, Georgia, U.S.
- Bats: Right Throws: Right

Brennan Cole Milone (born May 6, 2001) is an American professional baseball first baseman and outfielder in the Athletics organization.

Milone attended Woodstock High School in Woodstock, Georgia. He was selected by the Los Angeles Dodgers in the 28th round of the 2019 Major League Baseball draft, but did not sign. Milone started his college baseball at South Carolina University for two years before transferring to the University of Oregon where he played one year. In 2022, he played collegiate summer baseball with the Brewster Whitecaps of the Cape Cod Baseball League. He was selected by the Oakland Athletics in the sixth round of the 2022 MLB draft and signed.

Milone started his professional career with the Arizona Complex League Athletics for two games before being promoted to the Stockton Ports. He played 2023 with Stockton and the Lansing Lugnuts and 2024 with the Midland RockHounds. Milone started 2025 with Midland before being promoted to the Las Vegas Aviators.

- Career statistics from Baseball Reference (Minors)

=== Nate Nankil ===
Nate Nankil

Athletics
- Outfielder
- Born: October 16, 2002 (age 24); San Diego, California, U.S.
- Bats: Right Throws: Right

Nathan Andrew Nankil (born October 16, 2002) is an American professional baseball outfielder in the Athletics organization.

Nankil played for Sweetwater Valley Little League in the 2015 Little League World Series. He attended Bonita Vista High School in Chula Vista, California, and played college baseball at California State University, Fullerton for the Titans. In 2022, he played in the Cape Cod Baseball League with the Chatham Anglers and batted .269 over 14 games. As a junior at Cal State Fullerton in 2023, Nankil played in 55 games and hit .316 with five home runs and 39 RBIs.

Nankil was selected by the Oakland Athletics in the seventh round of the 2023 Major League Baseball draft. He signed with the team for $300,000. He made his professional debut with the Arizona Complex League Athletics, hitting .189 over 16 games. Nankil split the 2024 season between the Stockton Ports and Lansing Lugnuts and batted .303 with 11 home runs and seventy RBIs over 111 games. He was named a California League All-Star. He opened the 2025 season with Lansing and was promoted to the Midland RockHounds in July. Over 124 games between the two teams, he hit .278 with three home runs, 56 RBIs, and ten stolen bases. In 2026, Nankil played with Stockton, Lansing, and Midland and batted .241 with seven home runs and 41 RBIs over 93 games.

- Career statistics from Baseball Reference (Minors)
- Cal State Fullerton Titans bio

=== Yaqui Rivera ===
Yaqui Rivera

Athletics
- Pitcher
- Born: July 19, 2003 (age 23); Santo Domingo, Dominican Republic
- Bats: Right Throws: Right

Yaqui Onasi Rivera (born July 19, 2003) is a Dominican professional baseball pitcher in the Athletics organization.

Rivera signed with the Miami Marlins as an international free agent in January 2021. On June 1, 2022, the Marlins traded him to the Baltimore Orioles as the player to be named later from the April 1 trade that sent Tanner Scott and Cole Sulser to the Marlins.

On November 17, 2026 the Orioles traded Rivera to the Athletics in exchange for Josiah Romeo and added him to their 40-man roster.

- Career statistics from Baseball Reference (Minors)

== Full Triple-A to Rookie League rosters ==
=== Triple-A ===
Las Vegas Aviators roster
Players		Coaches/Other
Pitchers: 14 Jamie Arnold; -- Blake Beers; -- Ben Bowden; 18 Nathan Dettmer; 36 Jackson Finley; 54 Jake Garland; 49 Jared Johnson; 46 Wei-En Lin; 46 Ryan Magdic; -- Yaqui Rivera	Catchers: 91 Davis Diaz; -- Anthony Marnell IV; Infielders: 7 Colby Halter; 11 Luke Mann; 8 Justin Riemer; 6 Drew Swift; Outfielders: 16 Jared Dickey; 26 Devin Taylor	Manager: 39 Fran Riordan; Coaches: 48 Paul Abbott (pitching); 55 Kevin Kouzmanoff (assistant hitting); 24 Brian McArn (hitting); 37 Don Schulze (assistant pitching); 7-day injured list; * On Athletics 40-man roster; ~ Development list; # Rehab assignment; ∞ Reserve list; ‡ Restricted list; § Suspended list; † Temporarily inactive list; Roster updated November 17, 2026; Transactions; → More rosters: MiLB • Pacific Coast League; → Athletics minor league players

=== Double-A ===
Midland RockHounds roster
Players		Coaches/Other
Pitchers: -- Mark Adamiak; 40 Corey Avant; 49 Henry Báez *; 17 Diego Barrera; 19 A.J. Causey; 34 Micah Dallas; 23 Jay Dill; 25 Steven Echavarria; 45 Ben Hansen; 27 Kenya Huggins; -- Will Johnston; 32 Braden Nett *; 9 Blaze Pontes; -- Edgar Sanchez; 18 Zane Taylor	Catchers: 21 Shane McGuire; 15 CJ Rodriguez; 16 Logan Sauve; Infielders: 13 Bobby Boser; 1 Ali Camarillo; 12 Leo De Vries; 5 Brennan Milone; 3 C.J. Pittaro; 12 Jared Sprague-Lott; 10 Casey Yamauchi; Outfielders: 3 Nate Nankil; 8 Clark Elliott; 22 Ryan Lasko; 20 Cameron Leary; 14 Pedro Pineda	Manager: 31 Gregorio Petit; Coaches: 19 Gunnar Buhner (assistant hitting); -- Dave Burba (bullpen); 25 Juan Dilone (hitting); 6 Beau Taylor (coach); 7-day injured list; * On Athletics 40-man roster; ~ Development list; # Rehab assignment; ∞ Reserve list; ‡ Restricted list; § Suspended list; † Temporarily inactive list; Roster updated November 2, 2026; Transactions; → More rosters: MiLB • Texas League; → Athletics minor league players

=== High-A ===
Lansing Lugnuts roster
Players		Coaches/Other
Pitchers: 21 Ryan Brown; 17 Samuel Dutton; 18 Riley Huge; 31 Griffin Kirn '; 34 Jack Mahoney; 30 Jorge Marcheco; 25 Abel Mercedes; 32 Mitch Myers; 26 Jackson Nove; 29 Tucker Novotny; 22 Jose Parra; 20 Gerlin Rosario; 10 Tzu-Chen Sha; 33 Chen Zhong-Ao Zhuang *	Catchers: 36 Bryan Arendt; 2 Dylan Fien; Infielders: 14 Daniel Bucciero; 1 Jared Davis; 8 Gunner Gouldsmith; 27 Tanner Marsh; 9 Myles Naylor; Outfielders: 5 Alex Fernandes; 24 Rodney Green Jr.; 4 Breyson Guedez; 37 Jake Reinisch	Manager: 19 Javier Goddard; Coaches: 12 Luis Baez (hitting); 15 Levi Kelly (pitching); 40 Ron Witmeyer (hitting); 7-day injured list; * On Athletics 40-man roster; ~ Development list; # Rehab assignment; ∞ Reserve list; ‡ Restricted list; § Suspended list; † Temporarily inactive list; Roster updated November 2, 2026; Transactions; → More rosters: MiLB • Midwest League; → Athletics minor league players

=== Single-A ===
Stockton Ports roster
Players		Coaches/Other
Pitchers: 22 Wilfred Alvarado; 26 Tyler August; 20 Alex Barr; 14 Corey Braun; 12 Kade Brown; 40 Colin Fitzgerald; 22 Blake Hammond; 25 Jackson Holmes; 18 Dominic Mauro; 44 Cole Miller; 14 Josnier Parra; 23 Mason Patel; 17 Jackson Phipps; 46 Grant Richardson; 11 Sam Stuhr; 19 Itsuki Takemoto; 9 Donny Troconis	Catchers: 33 Ramon Landaeta; 21 Alex Sosa; Infielders: 13 Bryan Andrade; 3 Michael Brooks; 5 Bjay Cooke; 37 Max Durrington; 29 Alex Hernandez; 10 Roman Martin; 38 Edgar Montero; 8 Shotaro Morii; 7 Ben Newton; Outfielders: 27 Bobby Blandford; 4 Drew Burress; 15 Jose Ramos; 1 Gavin Turley	Manager: -- Darryl Kennedy; Coaches: -- Cooper Goldby (hitting); 35 Jim Gott (pitching); -- Jose Ortiz (hitting); 7-day injured list; * On Athletics 40-man roster; ~ Development list; # Rehab assignment; ∞ Reserve list; ‡ Restricted list; § Suspended list; † Temporarily inactive list; Roster updated November 17, 2026; Transactions; → More rosters: MiLB • California League; → Athletics minor league players

=== Rookie ===
Arizona Complex League Athletics roster
Players		Coaches/Other
Pitchers: -- Nathan Aceves; -- Evan Blanco; -- Luis Burgos; 66 Felix Castro; 78 Paul Chacon; -- Jacob Dudan; -- Mason Edwards; -- Gabe Gaeckle; 81 Diomar Gonzalez; 79 Erick Matos; -- Max McGuire; 71 Amilcar Medina; 67 Aiden Moffett; 25 Oliver Sirotti; -- Caden Sivrich; 38 Angel Vizcaino; -- Aidan Weaver; 94 Roberto Urdaneta; 45 Franco Zabaleta	Catchers: -- Max Aude; -- Carlos Franco; -- Cesar Gonzalez; -- Bear Madliak; 55 Alejandro Pereira; 23 Diego Rosa; Infielders: -- Javier Gorostola; -- Shintaro Inoue; 56 Judah Morris; -- James Whitman; -- KJ White Jr.; Outfielders: 16 Darling Fernandez; 3 Jeison Lopez; -- Dylan O'Connell; -- Carlos Pacheco; -- Javar Williams	Manager: 91 Gunner Buhner; Coaches: 7 Mike Benjamin (hitting); 28 Craig Conklin (coach); 50 Ruben Escalera (hitting); 46 John Foster (pitching); 47 Rick Rodriguez (pitching); 12 Adam Rosales (coach); 7-day injured list; * On Athletics 40-man roster; ~ Development list; # Rehab assignment; ∞ Reserve list; ‡ Restricted list; § Suspended list; † Temporarily inactive list; Roster updated September 14, 2026; Transactions; → More rosters: MiLB • Arizona Complex League; → Athletics minor league players

=== Foreign Rookie ===
Dominican Summer League Athletics roster
Players		Coaches/Other
Pitchers: 20 Jhose Brea; 31 Yerlin Burgos; 30 Luis Contreras; 54 Keiver De Horta; 6 Jesus Delgado; 91 Jonathan Durantt; -- Flasherming Ernesto; -- Manuel Fernandez; 5 Yelfi Garcia; 50 Luis Guevara; 89 Wensloby Jhon; 36 Jordan Key; 12 Edwin Mendoza; 41 Frailyn Minier; 49 Ricardo Osorio; 80 Albert Ramos; 60 Jareth Rayo; 21 Ricardo Reyes; 2 Oliver Sirotti; 33 Alvin Veras	Catchers: 23 Aiverson Barazarte; 99 Azaeel Pacheco; 92 Jose Perdomo; Infielders: 52 Johenssy Colome; 17 Brayan Cota; 63 Luis Cuevas; 64 Yorvit Diaz; 93 Ricky Duran; 35 Erick Encarnacion; 29 Kenny Fermin; 4 Ayden Johnson; 5 Edward Suazo; Outfielders: 25 Darwing Ozuna; 51 Darian Rojas; 11 Sebastian Rojas; 47 Carlos Salmeron	Manager: Wilkin Castillo; Coaches: David Brito (pitching); Carlos Casimiro (infield); Pedro Figueroa (pitching); Manny Garcia (coach); Kevin Riggs (hitting); Alex Valdez (hitting); Jose Vicente (hitting); 7-day injured list; * On Athletics 40-man roster; ~ Development list; # Rehab assignment; ∞ Reserve list; ‡ Restricted list; § Suspended list; † Temporarily inactive list; Roster updated November 2, 2026; Transactions; → More rosters: MiLB • Dominican Summer League; → Athletics minor league players
