= Jamie Arnold (baseball, born 2004) =

American baseball player (born 2004)

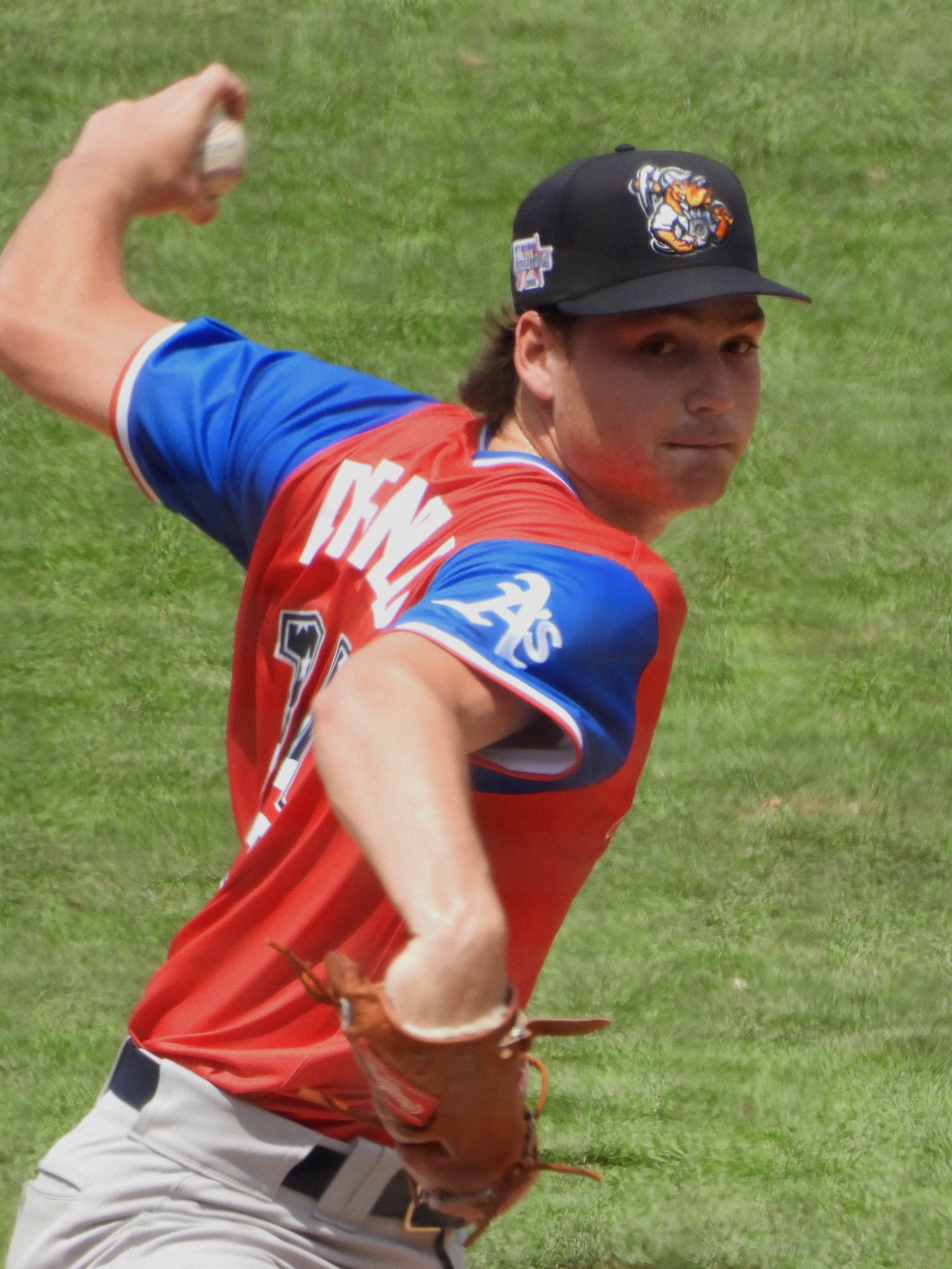
- Arnold pitching for the American League Futures in 2026

Athletics
- Pitcher
- Born: March 21, 2004 (age 22); Tampa, Florida, U.S.
- Bats: Left Throws: Left
- Stats at Baseball Reference

James Charles Arnold (born March 21, 2004) is an American professional baseball pitcher in the Athletics organization.

== Amateur career ==
Arnold attended Jesuit High School in Tampa, Florida, where he played baseball and basketball. As a senior in 2022, he posted a 2.02 ERA and 91 strikeouts over 66 innings. Arnold went unselected in the 2022 Major League Baseball draft and enrolled at Florida State University to play college baseball.

As a freshman at Florida State in 2023, Arnold appeared in 24 games and went 2–5 with a 6.34 ERA over 44 innings. He played in the Cape Cod Baseball League for the Hyannis Harbor Hawks after the season and was named an All-Star. As a sophomore in 2024, Arnold started 18 games and posted an 11–3 record, a 2.98 ERA, and 159 strikeouts over 105 2/3 innings and was named an All-American. After the season, he was selected to play for the USA Baseball Collegiate National Team and was the starting pitcher in a combined no-hitter in a games versus Chinese Taipei. Entering the 2025 season, Arnold was considered a top prospect for the upcoming MLB draft. He returned to Florida State as the team's number one starter. Over 15 starts for the season, Arnold went 8–2 with a 2.98 ERA and 119 strikeouts over 84 2/3 innings.

== Professional career ==
Arnold was selected by the Athletics in the first round with the eleventh overall pick of the 2025 Major League Baseball draft. On July 23, Arnold signed with the team for a $5.9 million signing bonus.

Arnold was assigned to the Midland RockHounds of the Double-A Texas League to open the 2026 season and to make his professional debut. He was selected to represent the Athletics at the 2026 All-Star Futures Game alongside Leo De Vries. He started 23 games for Midland and had a 6–5 record, a 3.57 ERA, and 125 strikeouts across 113 1/3 innings pitched. On August 31, Arnold was promoted to the Triple-A Las Vegas Aviators. In his second start with Las Vegas, he was hit in the face by a line drive, and suffered multiple facial fractures.
