= Shotaro Morii =

Japanese baseball player (born 2006)

Athletics
- Infielder / Pitcher
- Born: December 15, 2006 (age 19); Fuchū, Tokyo, Japan
- Bats: Left Throws: Right

Shotaro Morii (森井翔太郎, Morii Shōtarō; born December 15, 2006) is a Japanese professional baseball infielder and pitcher in the Athletics organization.

== Amateur career ==
Morii attended Toho High School in Kunitachi, Tokyo, where he hit 45 home runs in his high school career and recorded a top pitch speed of 153 km/h (95 mph).

== Professional career ==
Although he was considered one of the top prospects for the 2024 NPB draft, Morii chose to forgo the draft in order to sign with a Major League Baseball organization. On January 15, 2025, Morii signed with the Athletics for a $1,510,500 signing bonus, the largest ever given by an MLB team to a Japanese amateur position player.

Morii made his pitching debut for the Single-A Stockton Ports on May 14, 2026, throwing a scoreless inning.
