= Austin Gauthier =

Free agent
- Infielder
- Born: May 7, 1999 (age 27); Cheyenne, Wyoming, U.S.
- Bats: Right Throws: Right

Austin James Gauthier (born May 7, 1999) is an American professional baseball infielder who is a free agent.

== Career ==
Gauthier attended South County High School in Lorton, Virginia, where he batted .410 as a senior with 20 RBIs, 22 runs and 19 stolen bases and was named a Virginia High School Coaches Association All-Star He played college baseball for Hofstra University. He hit .285 in 145 games for the Hostra Pride over four seasons with 14 homers, 73 RBI and 24 steals. As a senior, he was named to the All-Colonial Athletic Association First Team. He also played collegiate summer baseball with the FCA Braves of the Cal Ripken Sr. Collegiate Baseball League and the Vermont Mountaineers of the New England Collegiate Baseball League.

On July 27, 2021, Gauthier signed with the Los Angeles Dodgers as a non-drafted free agent. He began his professional career that year in the Arizona Complex League. hitting .255 in 30 games Gauthier split the 2022 season between the Rancho Cucamonga Quakes and the Great Lakes Loons, hitting .268 in 105 games. In 2023, he started with the Loons and was promoted to the Double-A Tulsa Drillers, hitting a combined .316 in 124 games with 12 homers and 59 RBI. The Dodgers invited him to major league spring training in 2024 as a non-roster invitee. Gauthier was selected to participate in the inaugural "Spring Breakout" minor league showcase during spring training 2024. After 24 games at Tulsa, Gauthier was promoted to the Triple-A Oklahoma City Baseball Club on May 7. Between the two levels, he played in 130 games, batting .253 with six homers and 48 RBI. He returned to Oklahoma City in 2025, played in 118 games, and batted .259. In 2026, he batted .234 with six home runs and 42 RBI in 101 games for Oklahoma City. He was released on November 17, 2026.
