= Chen Zhong-Ao Zhuang =

Taiwanese baseball player (born 2000)

Athletics
- Pitcher
- Born: August 25, 2000 (age 26); Hualien, Taiwan
- Bats: Right Throws: Right
- Stats at Baseball Reference

Chen Zhong-Ao Zhuang (born August 25, 2000) is a Taiwanese professional baseball pitcher in the Athletics organization.

== Playing career ==
On November 24, 2021, Zhuang signed with the Oakland Athletics as an international free agent. In 2025, he made 28 appearances (26 starts) for the Double-A Midland RockHounds, posting a 6–11 record and 4.08 ERA with 145 strikeouts across 145 2/3 innings pitched. On November 18, 2025, the Athletics added Zhuang to their 40-man roster to protect him from the Rule 5 draft.

Zhuang was optioned to the Triple-A Las Vegas Aviators to begin the 2026 season. He split the season between the Aviators and the RockHounds. Zhuang was designated for assignment by the Athletics on July 31. He cleared waivers and was sent outright to Triple–A Las Vegas on August 4. In 20 games (17 starts) across three levels of the minors he threw 84.2 innings going 4-6 with a 6.38 ERA and 63 strikeouts.

== Personal life ==
Inspired by his father's drawings of plumbing and electrical wiring, Zhuang creates artwork as a hobby.
