= Leo De Vries =

Dominican baseball player (born 2006)

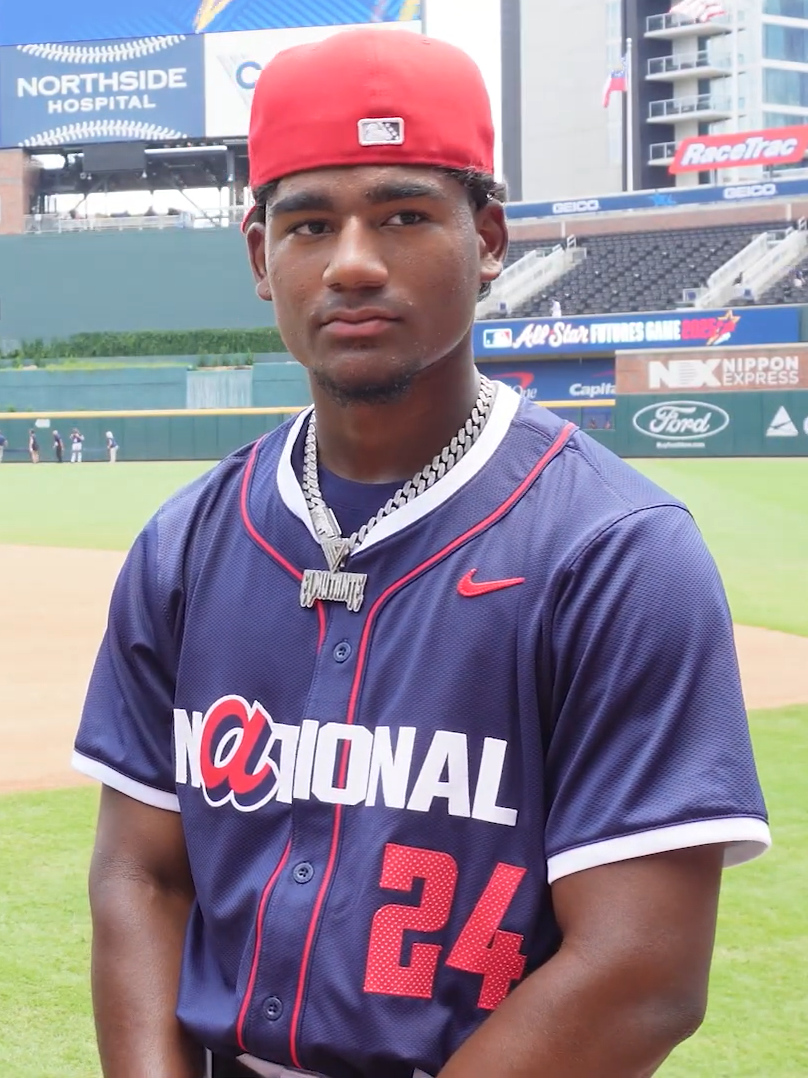
- De Vries at the 2025 All-Star Futures Game

Athletics
- Shortstop
- Born: October 11, 2006 (age 20); Azua, Dominican Republic
- Bats: Switch Throws: Right
- Stats at Baseball Reference

Leodalis De Vries (born October 11, 2006) is a Dominican-Dutch professional baseball shortstop in the Athletics organization.

== Early life ==
De Vries was born on October 11, 2006, in Azua, Dominican Republic. Prior to being signed by the Padres, he had never left the Dominican Republic.

== Career ==
=== San Diego Padres ===
Considered the top international prospect in the 2024 class, De Vries signed with the San Diego Padres on January 15, 2024, for $4.2 million. The signing would mark the second year in a row the Padres would sign the top international prospect, signing Ethan Salas in 2023. Following the signing, he was ranked in the Top 100 MLB Prospects by Baseball America and MLB.com.

De Vries was sent to the Single-A Lake Elsinore Storm on April 22, making his professional debut the next day. He hit his first professional home run on June 26, leading the Storm to a 3–1 win over the Rancho Cucamonga Quakes. On August 18, he suffered a right shoulder strain while diving for a ball, sidelining him for the rest of the season. In 75 games, De Vries had batted a slash of .238/.361/.442 with 11 home runs and 38 RBI with the Storm. By the end of the season, Baseball America ranked De Vries as the No. 1 prospect in the Padres organization over Ethan Salas. During September, he was drafted by the Águilas Cibaeñas in the Dominican Professional Baseball League (LIDOM), but went on to play with the Peoria Javelinas in the Arizona Fall League, where he became the youngest player to hit a home run in the Arizona Fall League since Bryce Harper in 2010.

De Vries started the 2025 with the High-A Fort Wayne TinCaps. On April 22, 2025, he hit for the cycle against the Lansing Lugnuts and tied the club record with eight RBI in a single game. In 82 total appearances for the TinCaps, De Vries slashed .245/.357/.410 with eight home runs, 46 RBI, and eight stolen bases.

=== Athletics ===
On July 31, 2025, the Padres traded De Vries, Braden Nett, Henry Baez and Eduarniel Núñez to the Athletics in exchange for Mason Miller and JP Sears. He was subsequently assigned to the High–A Lansing Lugnuts. On August 18, De Vries was promoted to the Double–A Midland RockHounds.

De Vries made 93 appearances for Midland in 2026, batting .290/.378/.458 with 13 home runs, 55 RBI, and 34 stolen bases. On September 8, 2026, it was announced that De Vries would require surgery to repair the anterior labrum in his right shoulder.

== Personal life ==
In April 2025, De Vries acquired Dutch citizenship through his grandparents, making him eligible to play for the Netherlands in the World Baseball Classic.
