= List of High-A baseball stadiums =

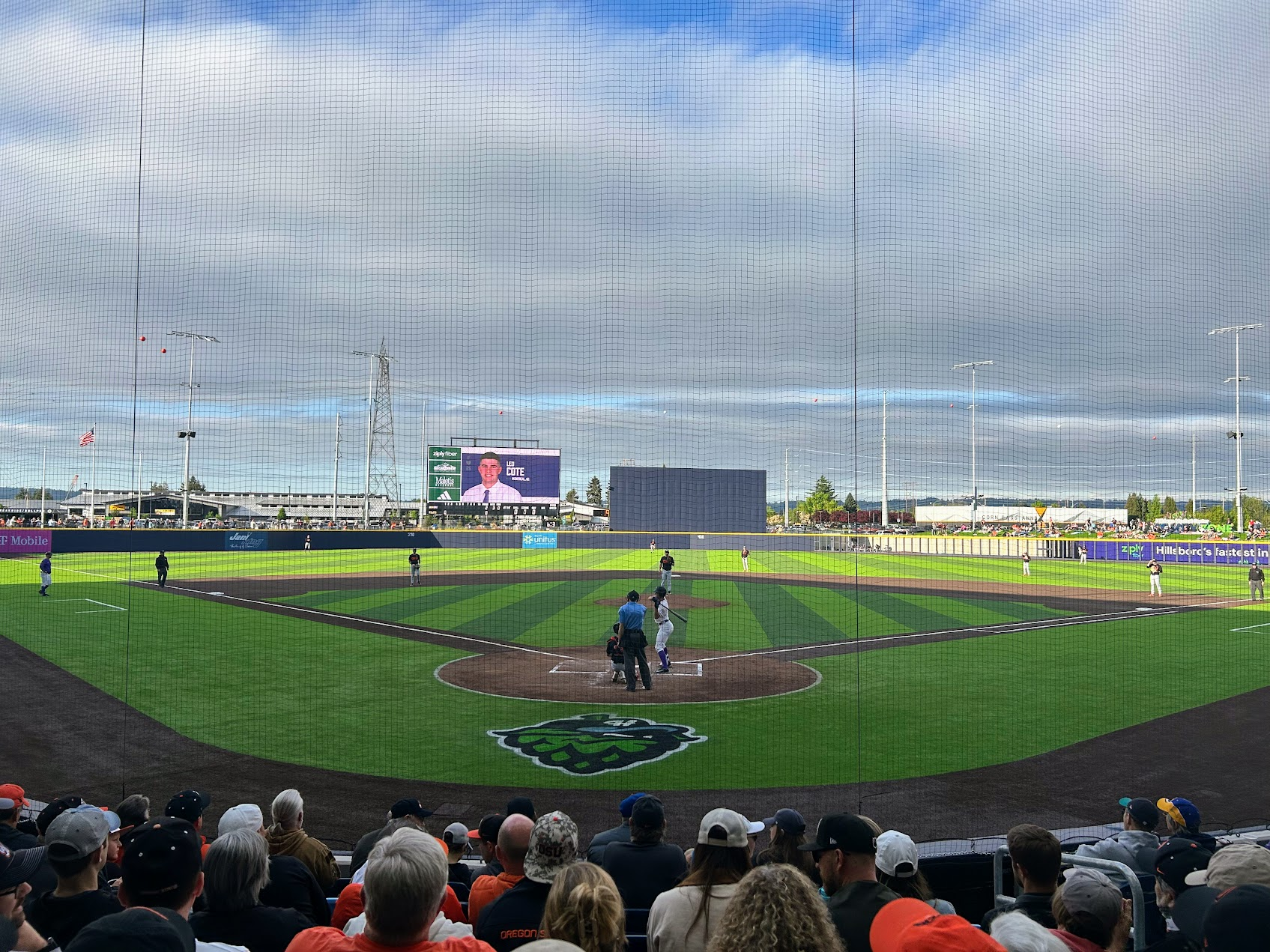
Hillsboro Hops Ballpark, the newest stadium in High-A, opened in 2026. It is the home of the Northwest League's Hillsboro Hops.

There are 30 ballparks in use by High-A Minor League Baseball teams. The Midwest League (MWL) and South Atlantic League (SAL) each uses 12 stadiums, and the Northwest League (NWL) uses six. The oldest stadium is HomeTrust Park (1924) in Asheville, North Carolina, home of the SAL's Asheville Tourists. The newest stadium is Hillsboro Hops Ballpark (2026) in Hillsboro, Oregon, home of the NWL's Hillsboro Hops. One stadium was built in each of the 1920s, 1930s, and 1940s, two in the 1950s, one in the 1980s, six in the 1990s, 14 in the 2000s, one in the 2010s and three in the 2020s. The highest seating capacity is 11,000 at Jackson Field in Lansing, Michigan, where the MWL's Lansing Lugnuts play. The lowest capacity is 3,654 at Gesa Stadium in Pasco, Washington, where the NWL's Tri-City Dust Devils play.

== Stadiums ==
=== Midwest League ===
Name	Team	City	State	Opened	Capacity	Ref.
Day Air Ballpark	Dayton Dragons	Dayton	Ohio	2000	7,230	
Parkview Field	Fort Wayne TinCaps	Fort Wayne	Indiana	2009	8,100	
Dow Diamond	Great Lakes Loons	Midland	Michigan	2007	5,200	
Classic Auto Group Park	Lake County Captains	Eastlake	Ohio	2003	7,273	
Jackson Field	Lansing Lugnuts	Lansing	Michigan	1996	11,000	
LMCU Ballpark	West Michigan Whitecaps	Comstock Park	Michigan	1994	9,281	
ABC Supply Stadium	Beloit Sky Carp	Beloit	Wisconsin	2021	3,850	
Veterans Memorial Stadium	Cedar Rapids Kernels	Cedar Rapids	Iowa	2002	5,300	
Dozer Park	Peoria Chiefs	Peoria	Illinois	2002	8,500	
Modern Woodmen Park	Quad Cities River Bandits	Davenport	Iowa	1931	7,140	
Four Winds Field at Coveleski Stadium	South Bend Cubs	South Bend	Indiana	1987	5,000	
Neuroscience Group Field at Fox Cities Stadium	Wisconsin Timber Rattlers	Appleton	Wisconsin	1995	5,900	

=== Northwest League ===
Name	Team	City	State / Province	Opened	Capacity	Ref.
PK Park	Eugene Emeralds	Eugene	Oregon	2009	4,000	
Funko Field	Everett AquaSox	Everett	Washington	1947	3,682	
Hillsboro Hops Ballpark	Hillsboro Hops	Hillsboro	Oregon	2026	6,000	
Avista Stadium	Spokane Indians	Spokane	Washington	1958	6,803	
Gesa Stadium	Tri-City Dust Devils	Pasco	Washington	1994	3,654	
Rogers Field at Nat Bailey Stadium	Vancouver Canadians	Vancouver	British Columbia	1951	6,500	

=== South Atlantic League ===
Name	Team	City	State	Opened	Capacity	Ref.
Nymeo Field at Harry Grove Stadium	Frederick Keys	Frederick	Maryland	1990	5,400	
Maimonides Park	Brooklyn Cyclones	Brooklyn	New York	2001	7,000	
Heritage Financial Park	Hudson Valley Renegades	Wappingers Falls	New York	1994	5,400	
ShoreTown Ballpark	Jersey Shore BlueClaws	Lakewood	New Jersey	2001	8,000	
Daniel S. Frawley Stadium	Wilmington Blue Rocks	Wilmington	Delaware	1993	6,404	
HomeTrust Park	Asheville Tourists	Asheville	North Carolina	1924	4,000	
Bowling Green Ballpark	Bowling Green Hot Rods	Bowling Green	Kentucky	2009	4,559	
First National Bank Field	Greensboro Grasshoppers	Greensboro	North Carolina	2005	7,499	
Fluor Field at the West End	Greenville Drive	Greenville	South Carolina	2006	5,700	
Fifth Third Park	Hub City Spartanburgers	Spartanburg	South Carolina	2025	5,000	
AdventHealth Stadium	Rome Emperors	Rome	Georgia	2003	5,105	
Truist Stadium	Winston-Salem Dash	Winston-Salem	North Carolina	2010	5,500	

== Map ==
Current High-A stadium locations:
- Midwest League
- Northwest League
- South Atlantic League

== Gallery ==
=== Midwest League ===
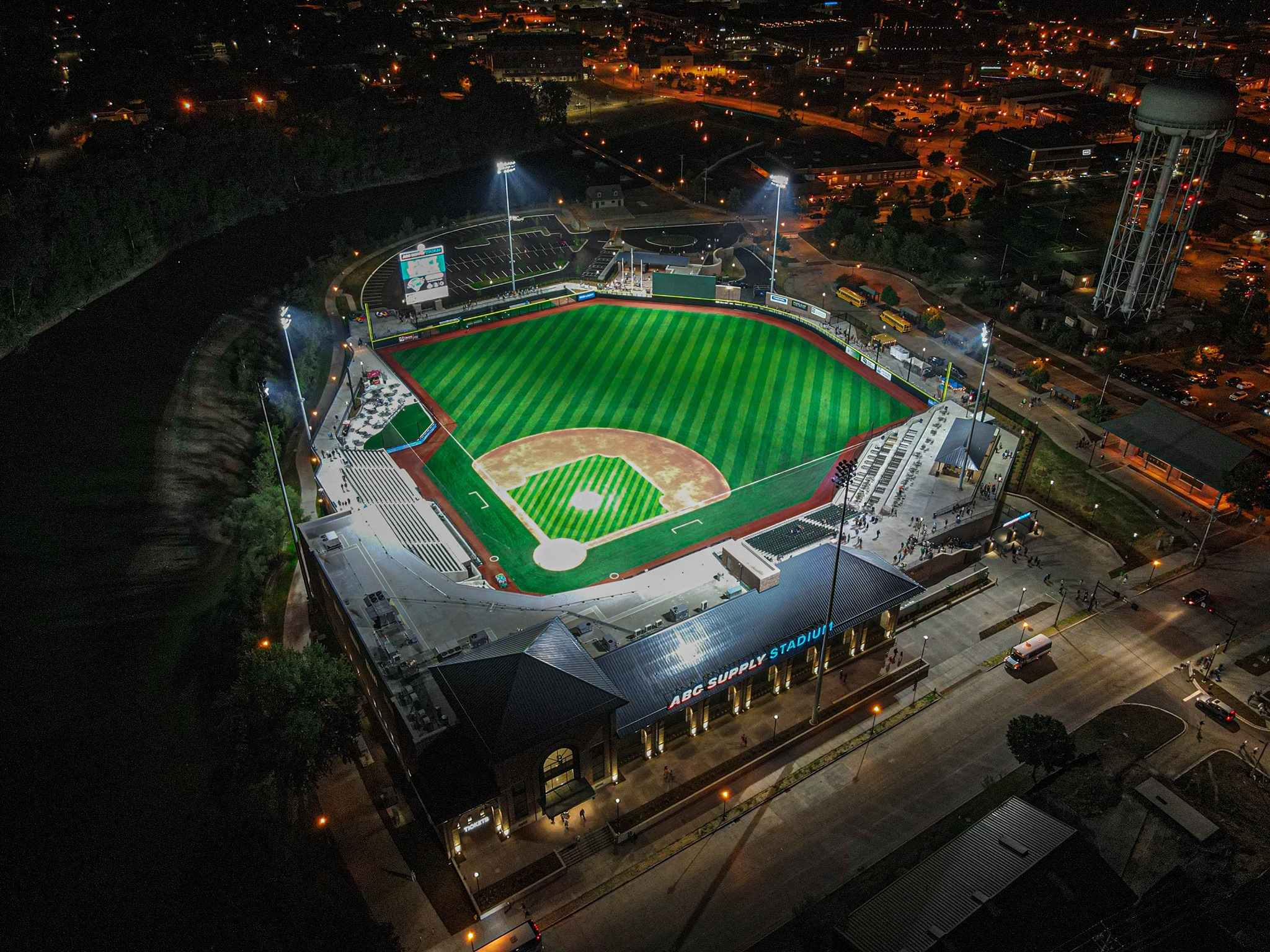
ABC Supply Stadium (Beloit Sky Carp)

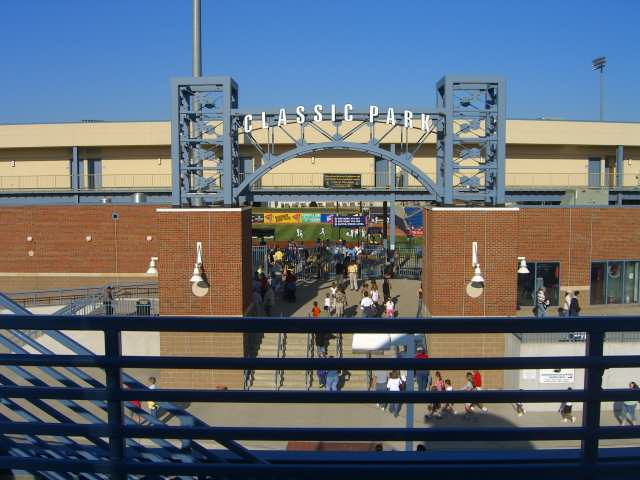
Classic Auto Group Park (Lake County Captains)

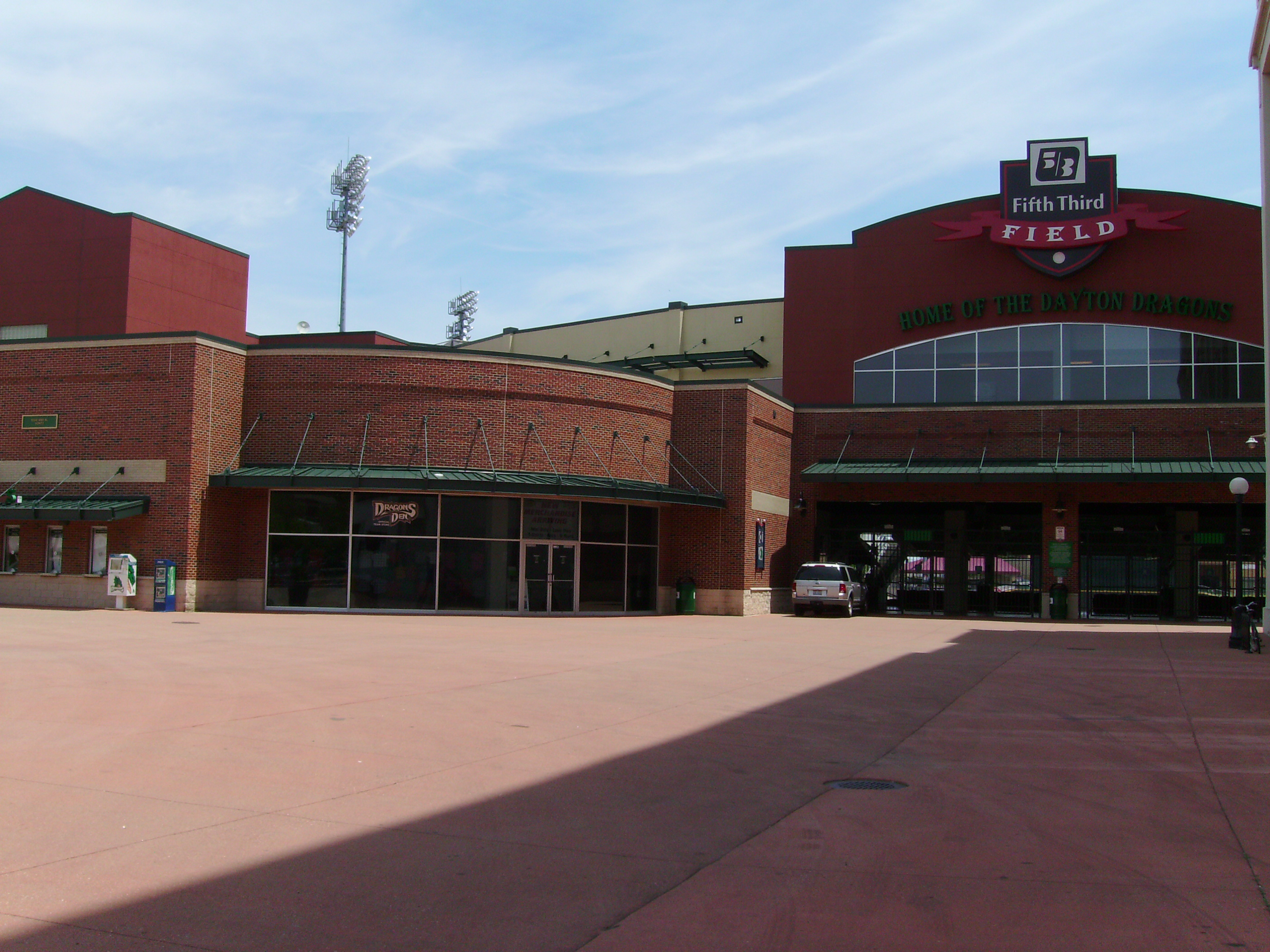
Day Air Ballpark (Dayton Dragons)

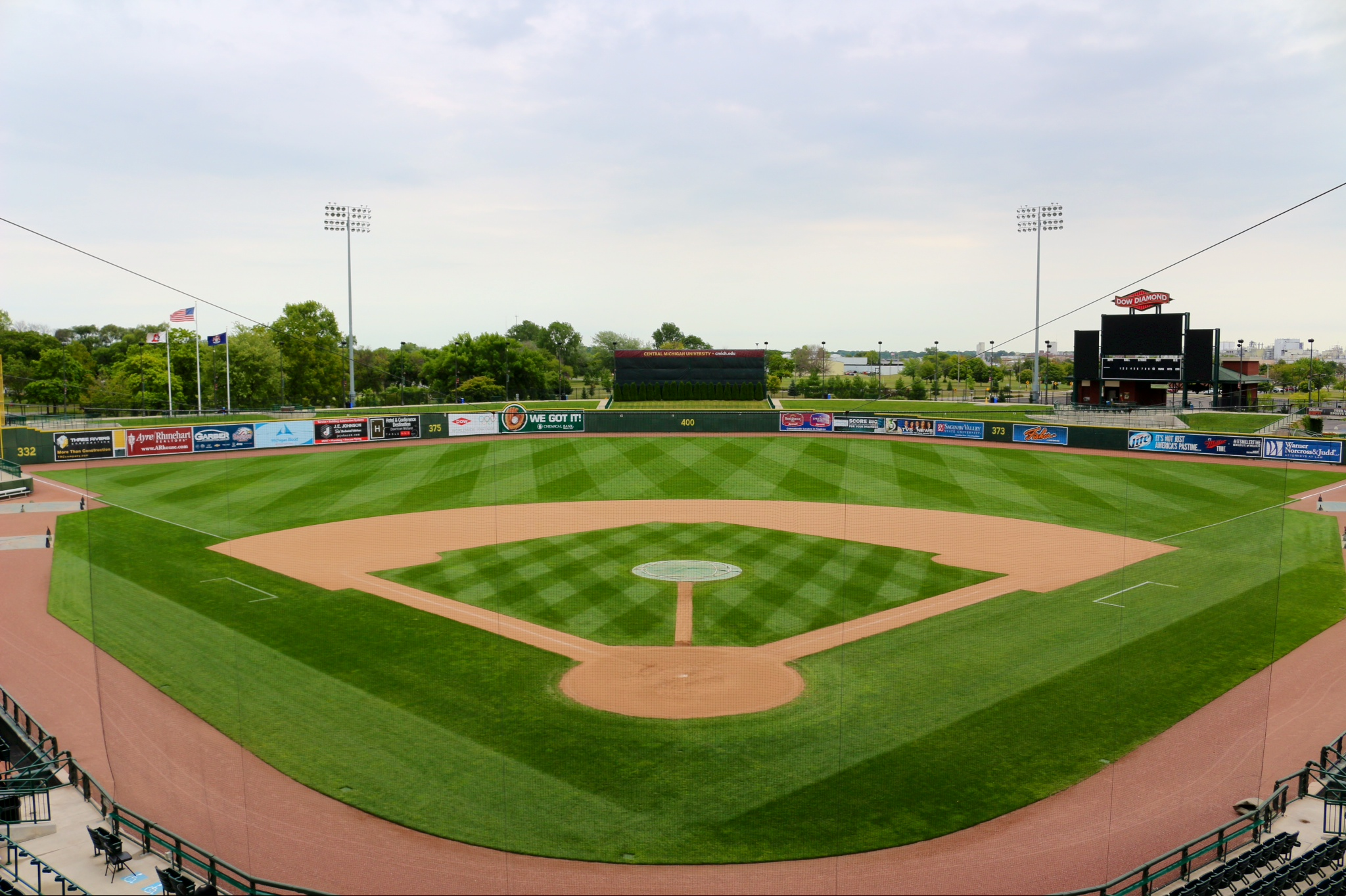
Dow Diamond (Great Lakes Loons)

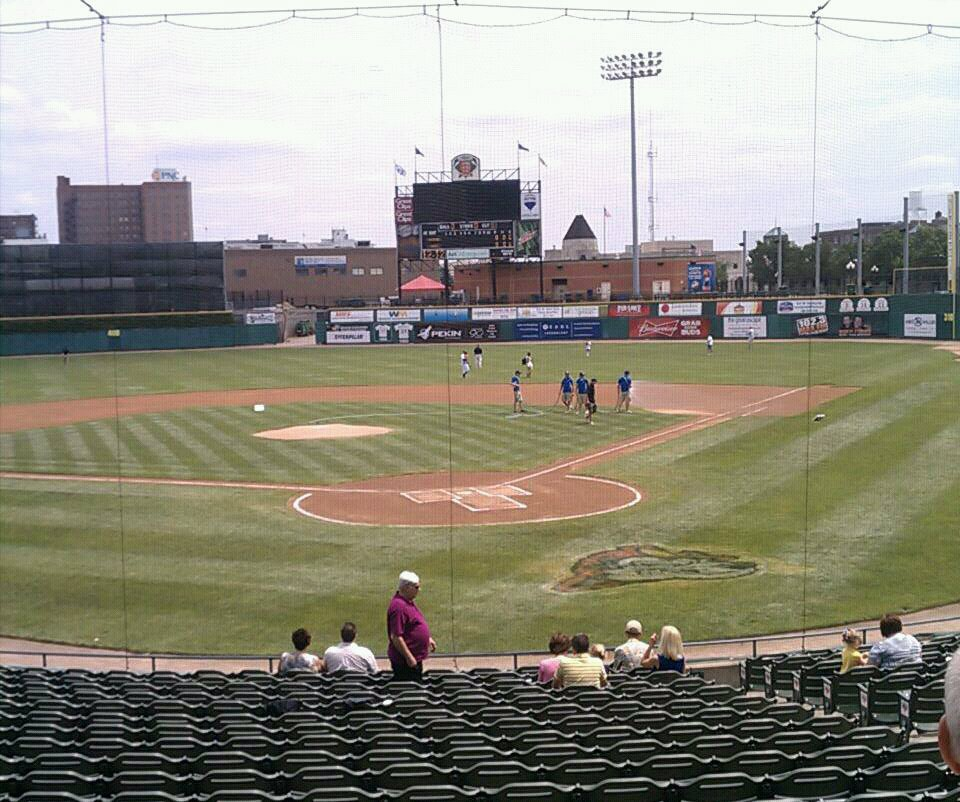
Dozer Park (Peoria Chiefs)

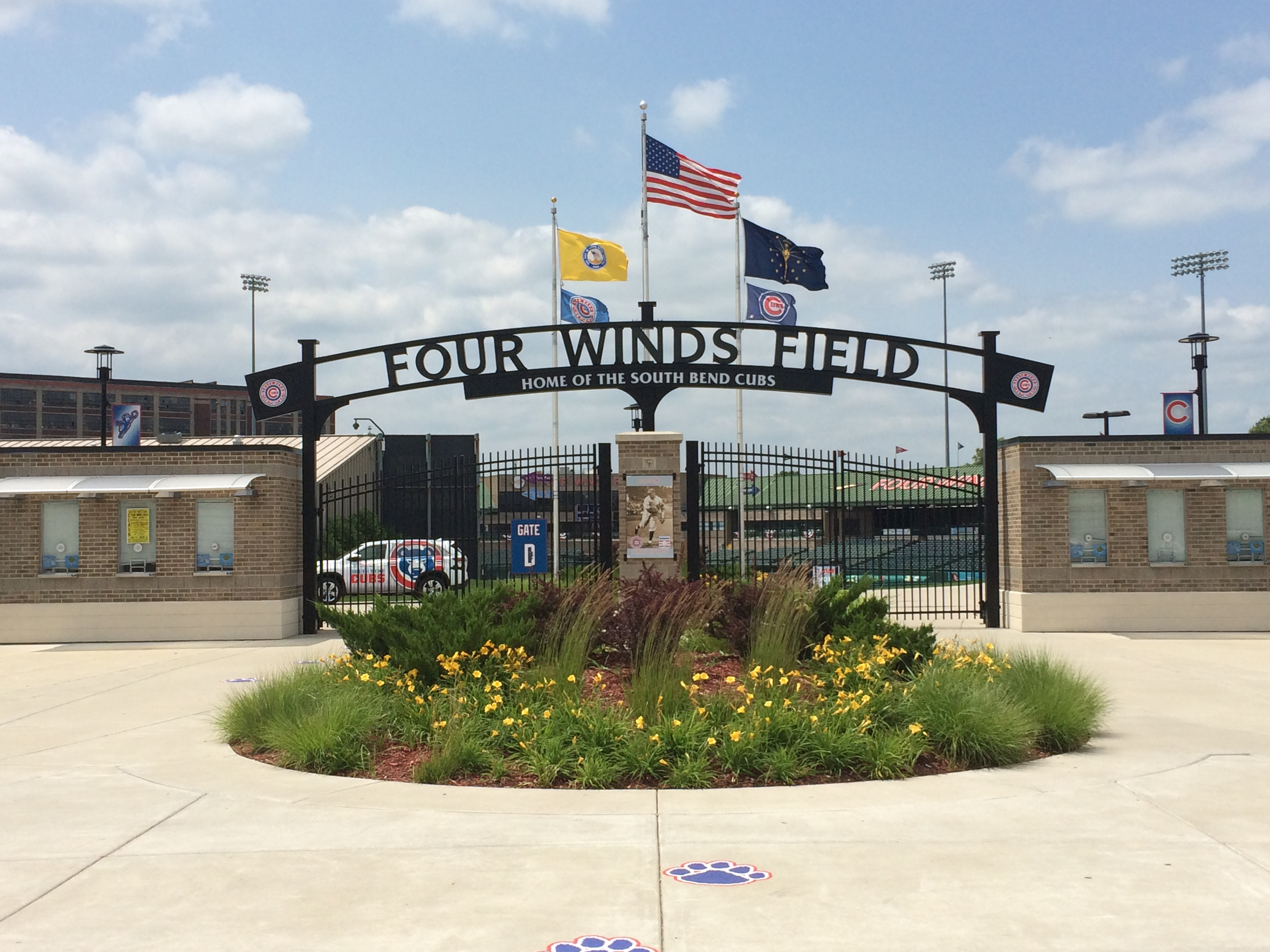
Four Winds Field at Coveleski Stadium (South Bend Cubs)

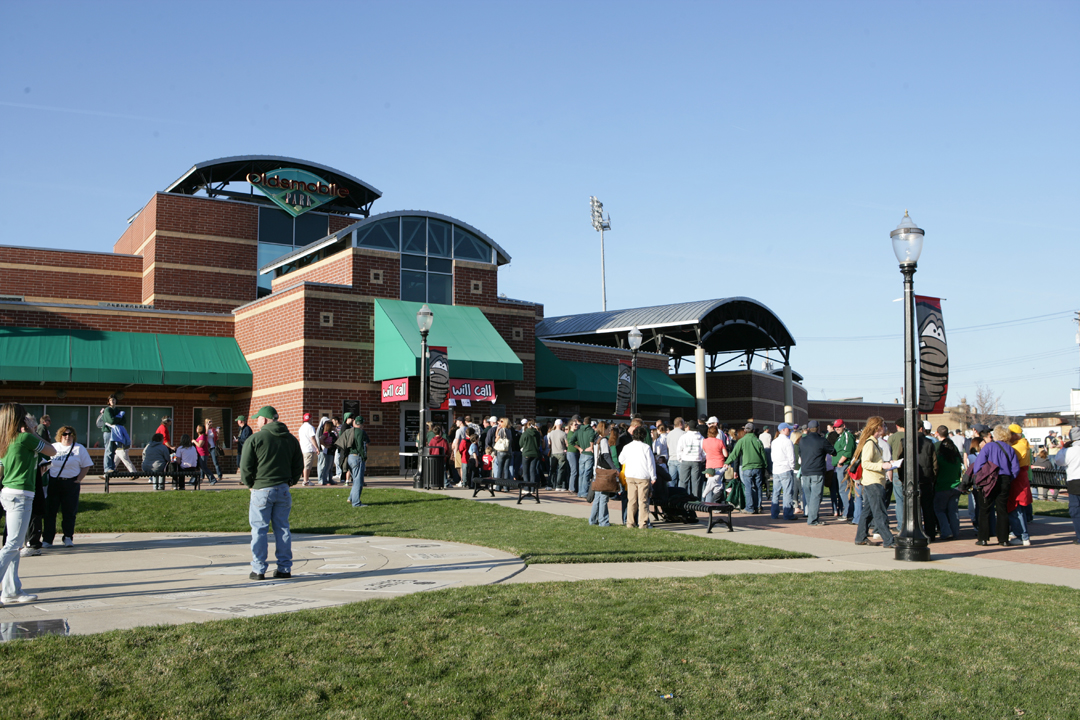
Jackson Field (Lansing Lugnuts)

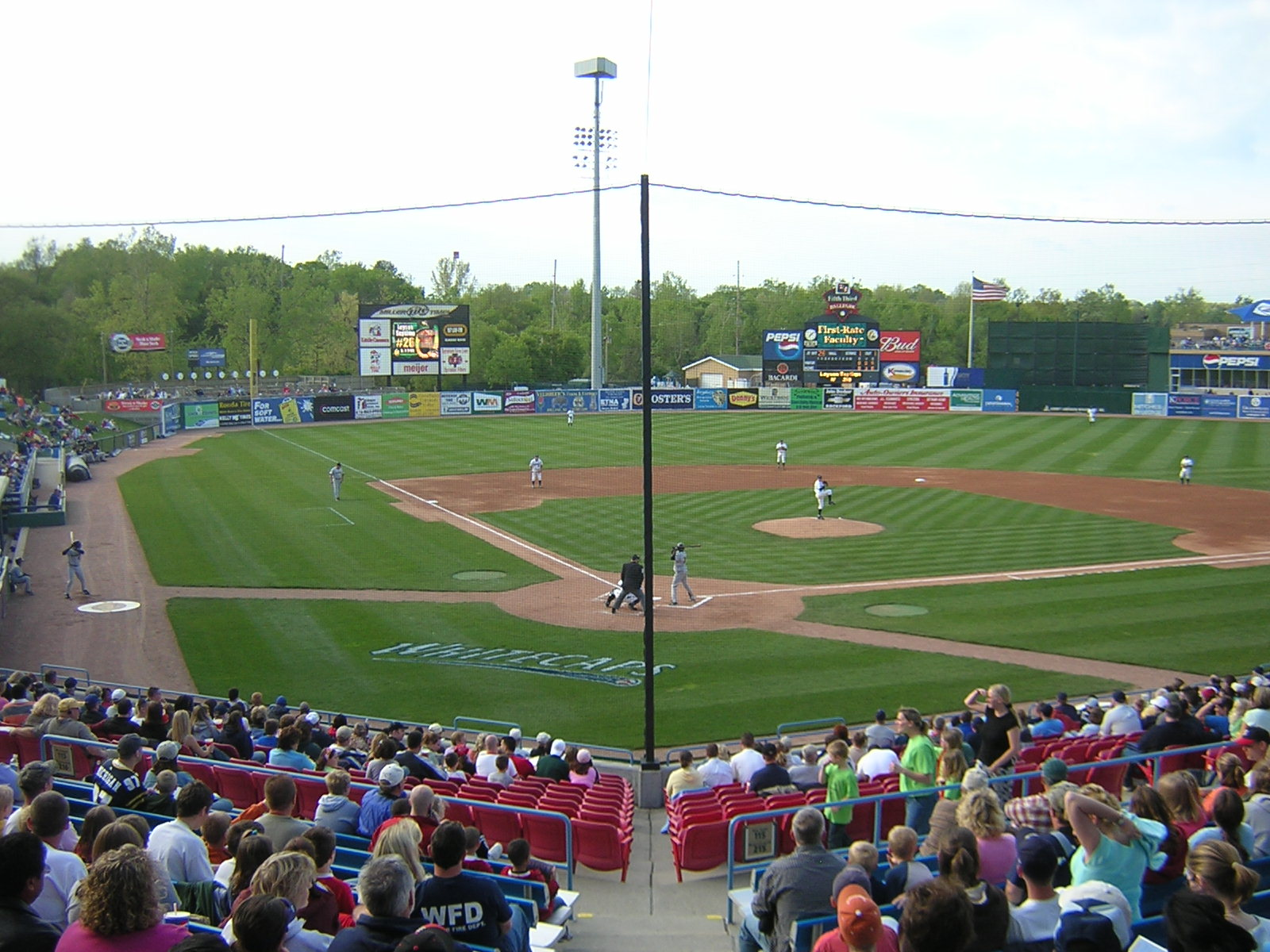
LMCU Ballpark (West Michigan Whitecaps)

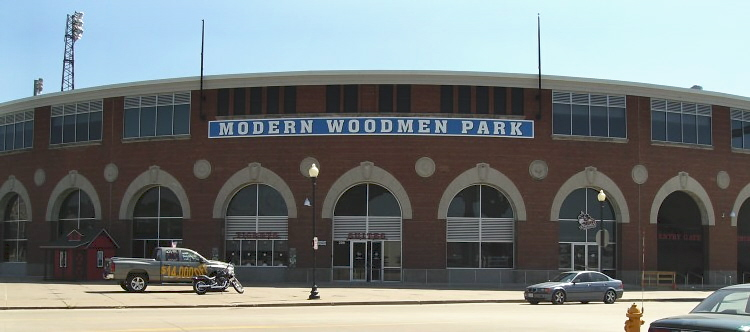
Modern Woodmen Park (Quad Cities River Bandits)

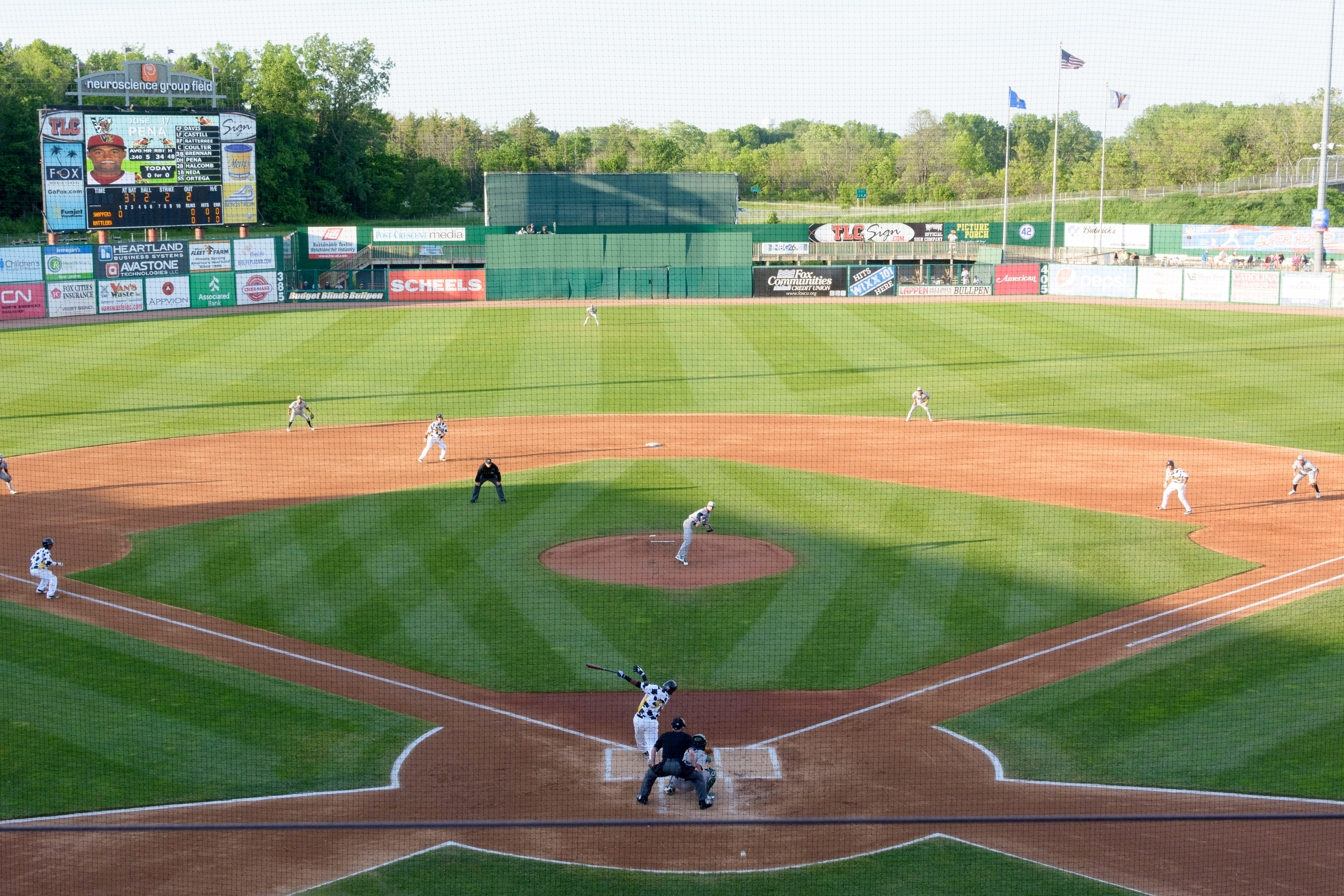
Neuroscience Group Field at Fox Cities Stadium (Wisconsin Timber Rattlers)

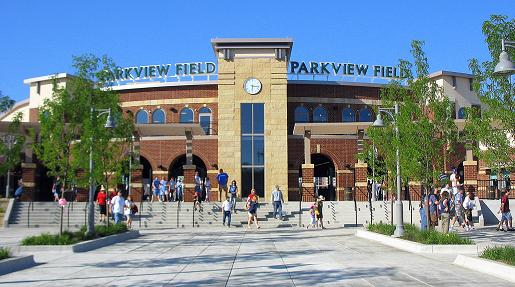
Parkview Field (Fort Wayne TinCaps)

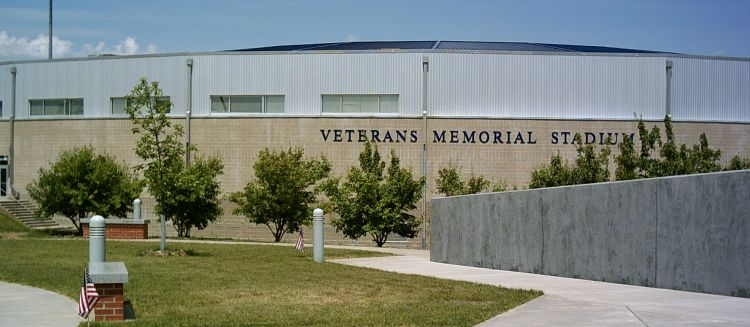
Veterans Memorial Stadium (Cedar Rapids Kernels)

=== Northwest League ===
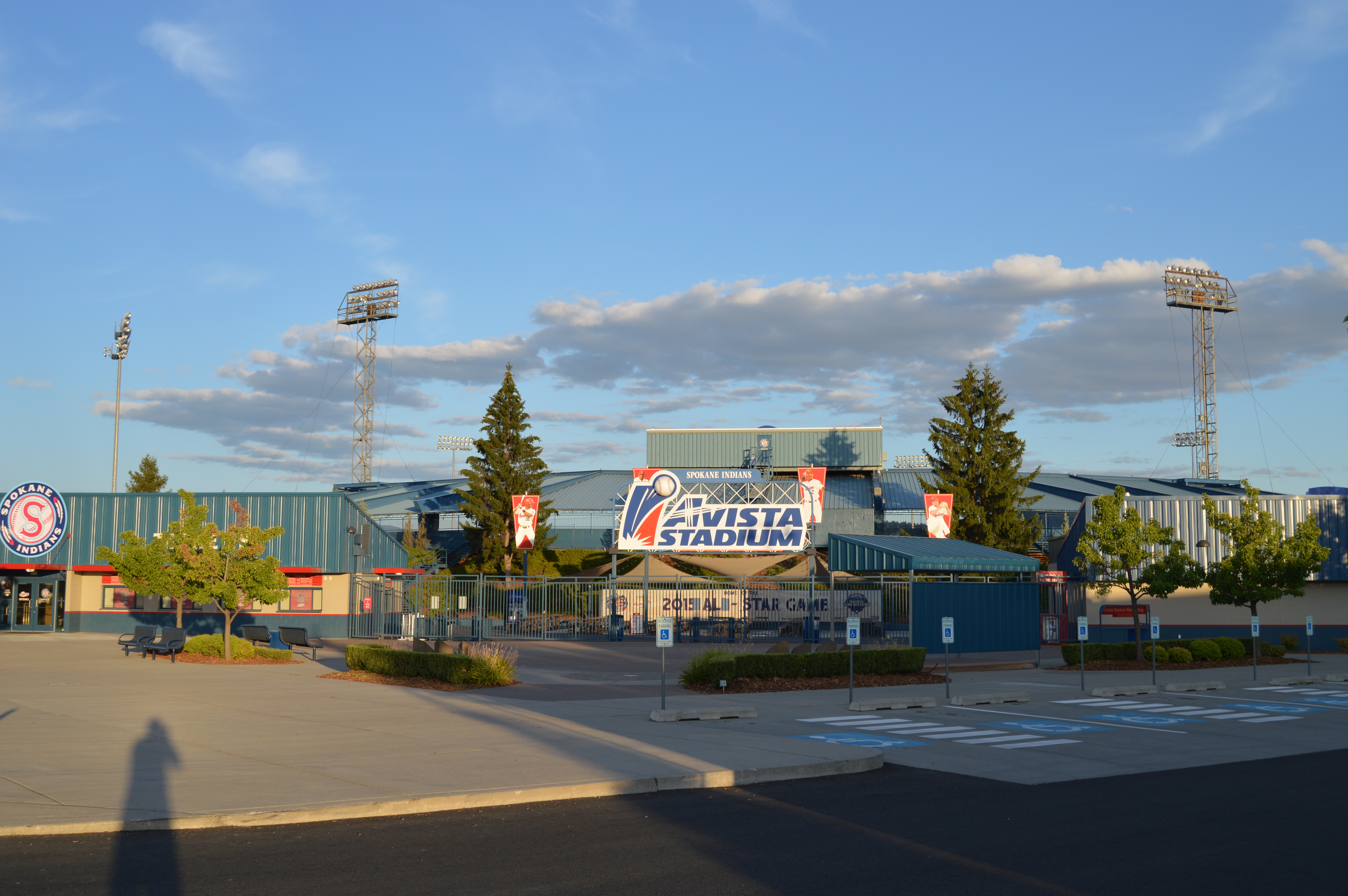
Avista Stadium (Spokane Indians)

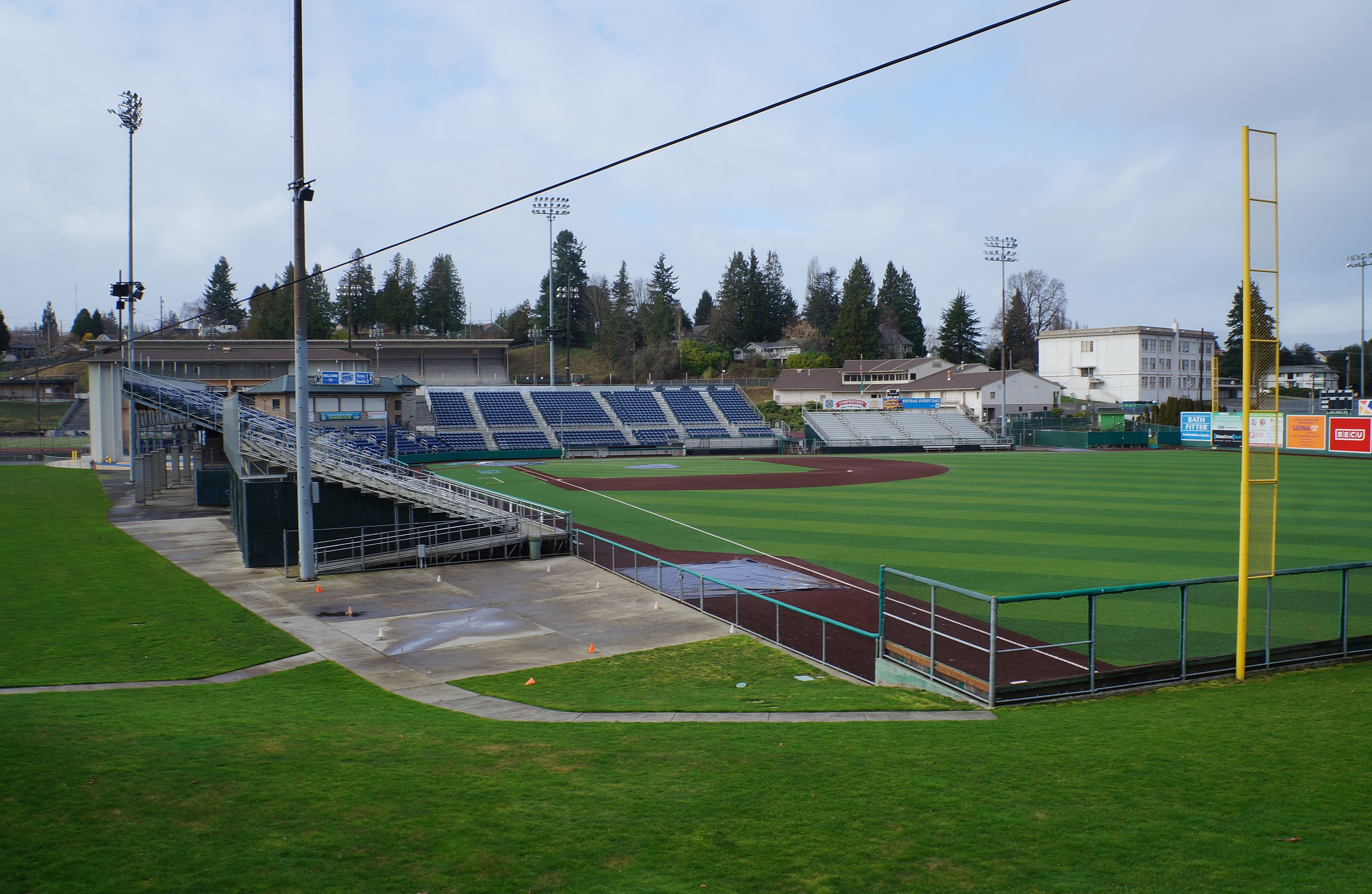
Funko Field (Everett AquaSox)

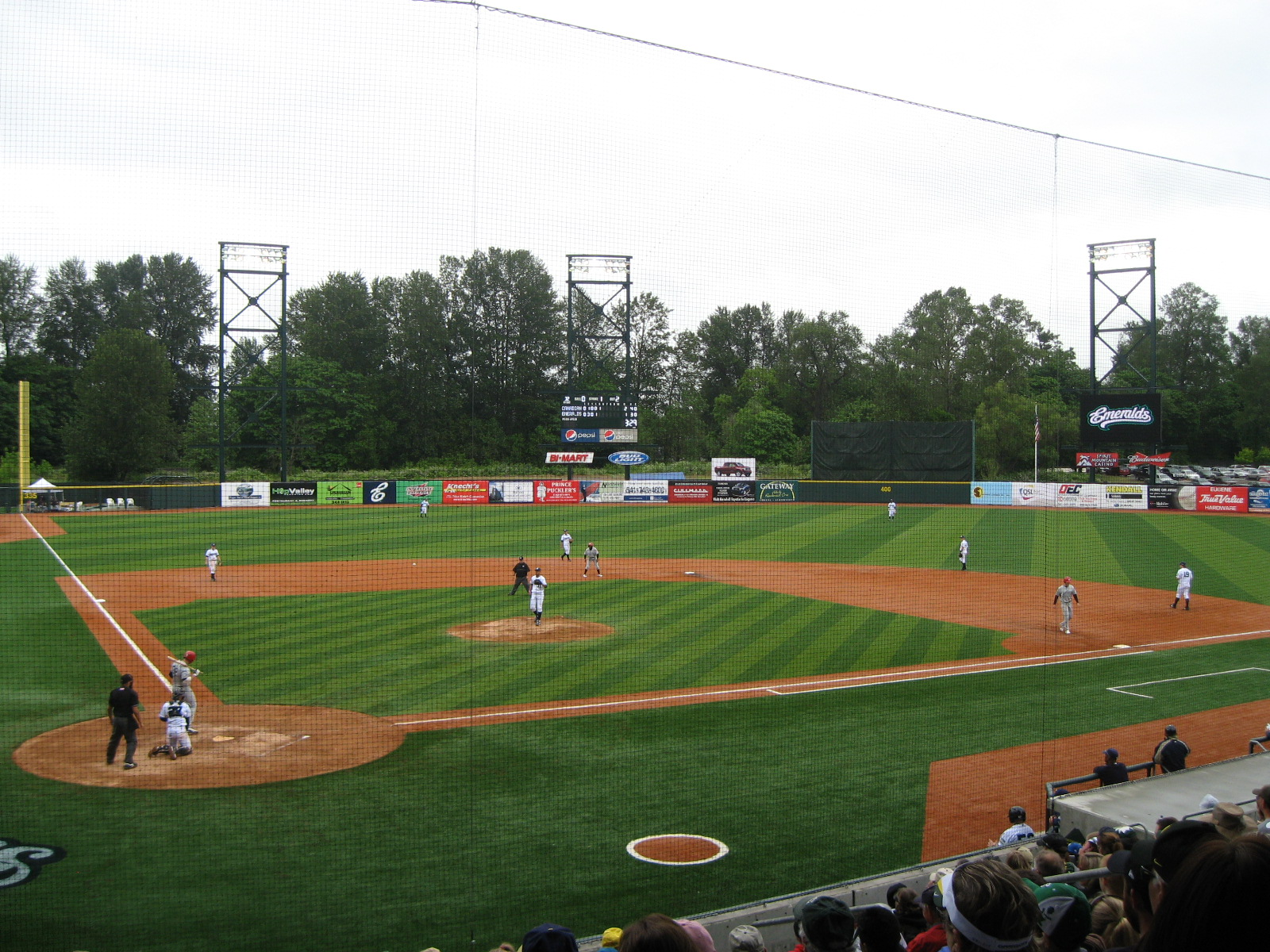
PK Park (Eugene Emeralds)

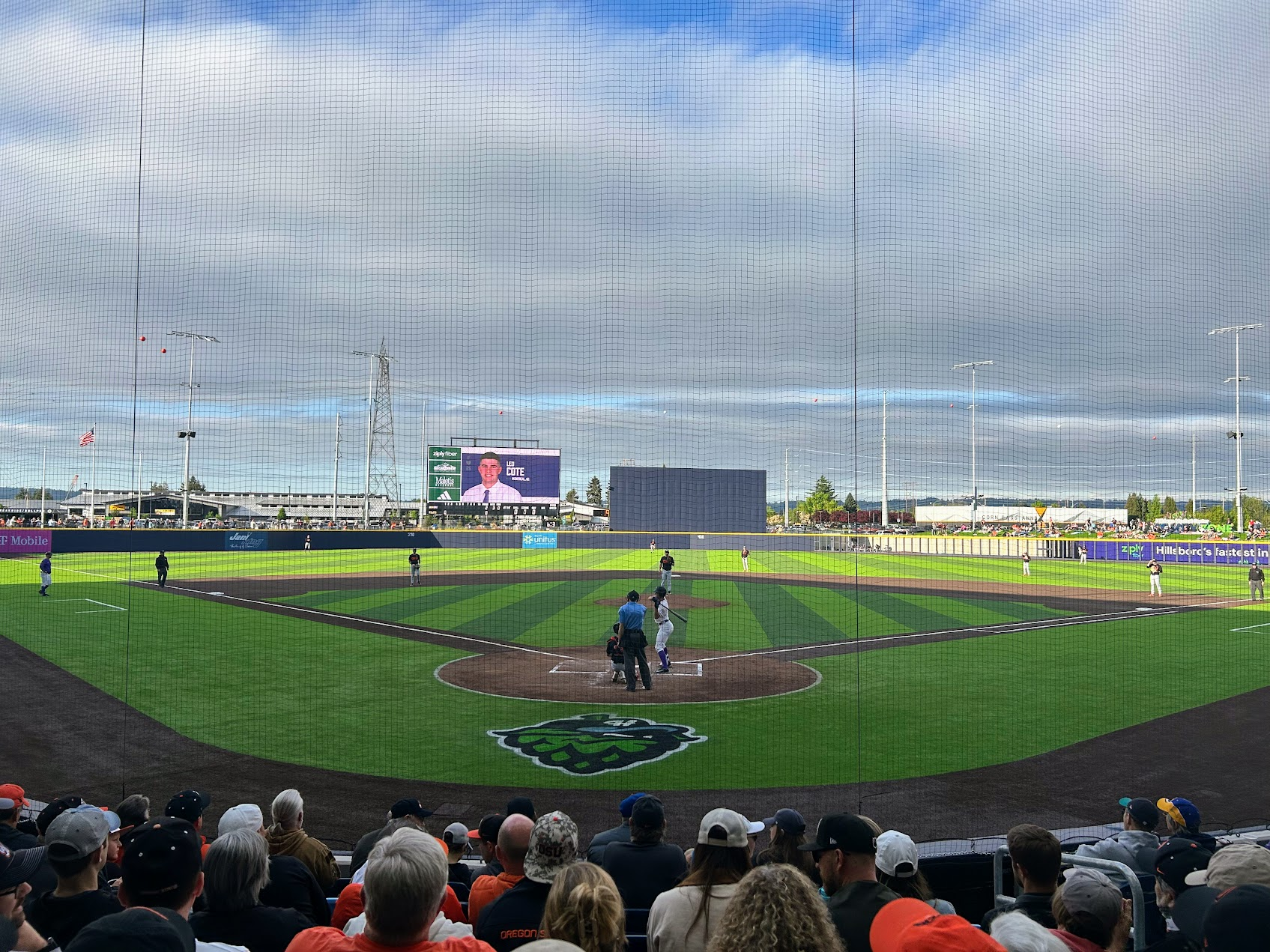
Hillsboro Hops Ballpark (Hillsboro Hops)

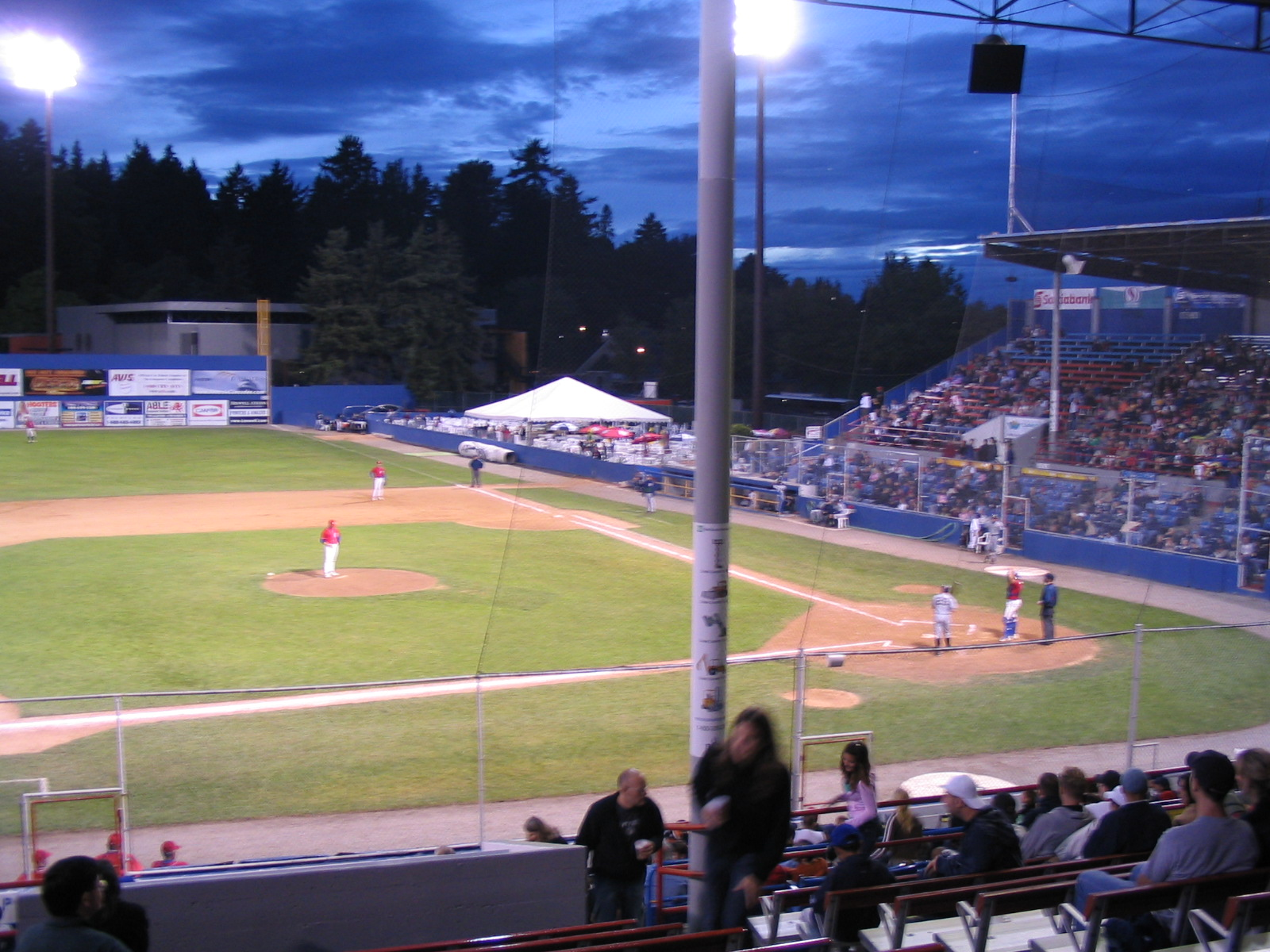
Rogers Field at Nat Bailey Stadium (Vancouver Canadians)

=== South Atlantic League ===
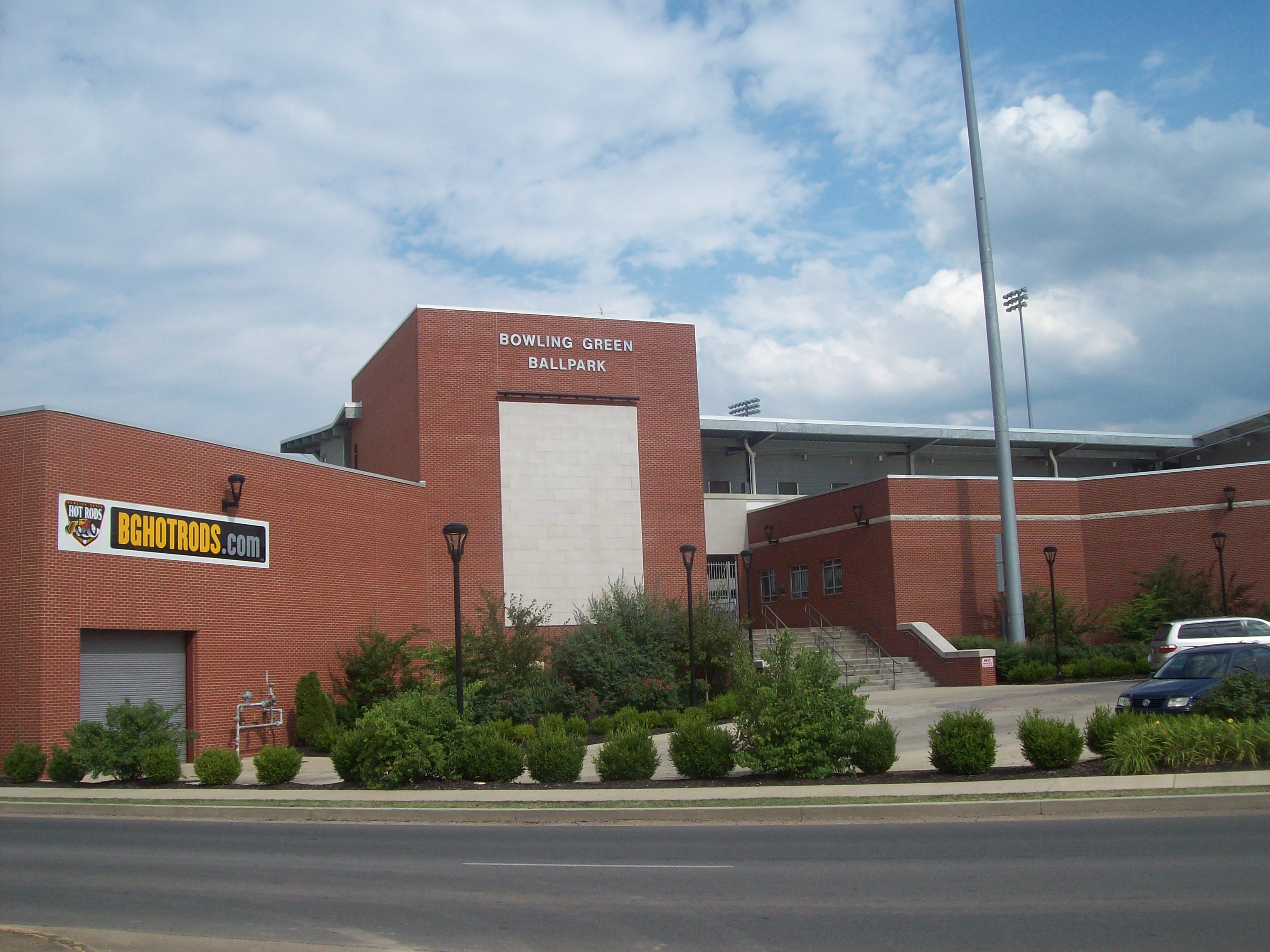
Bowling Green Ballpark (Bowling Green Hot Rods)

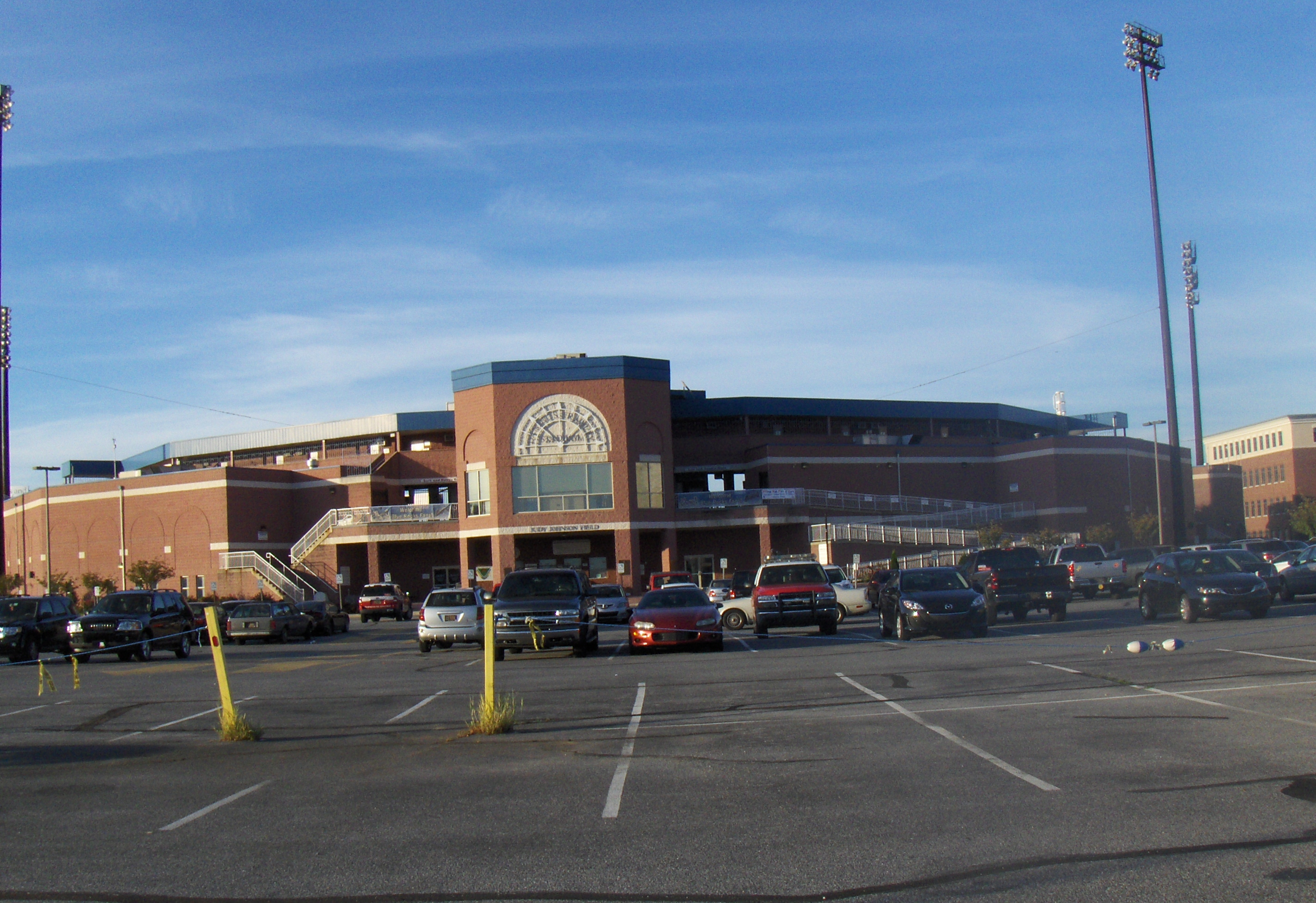
Daniel S. Frawley Stadium (Wilmington Blue Rocks)

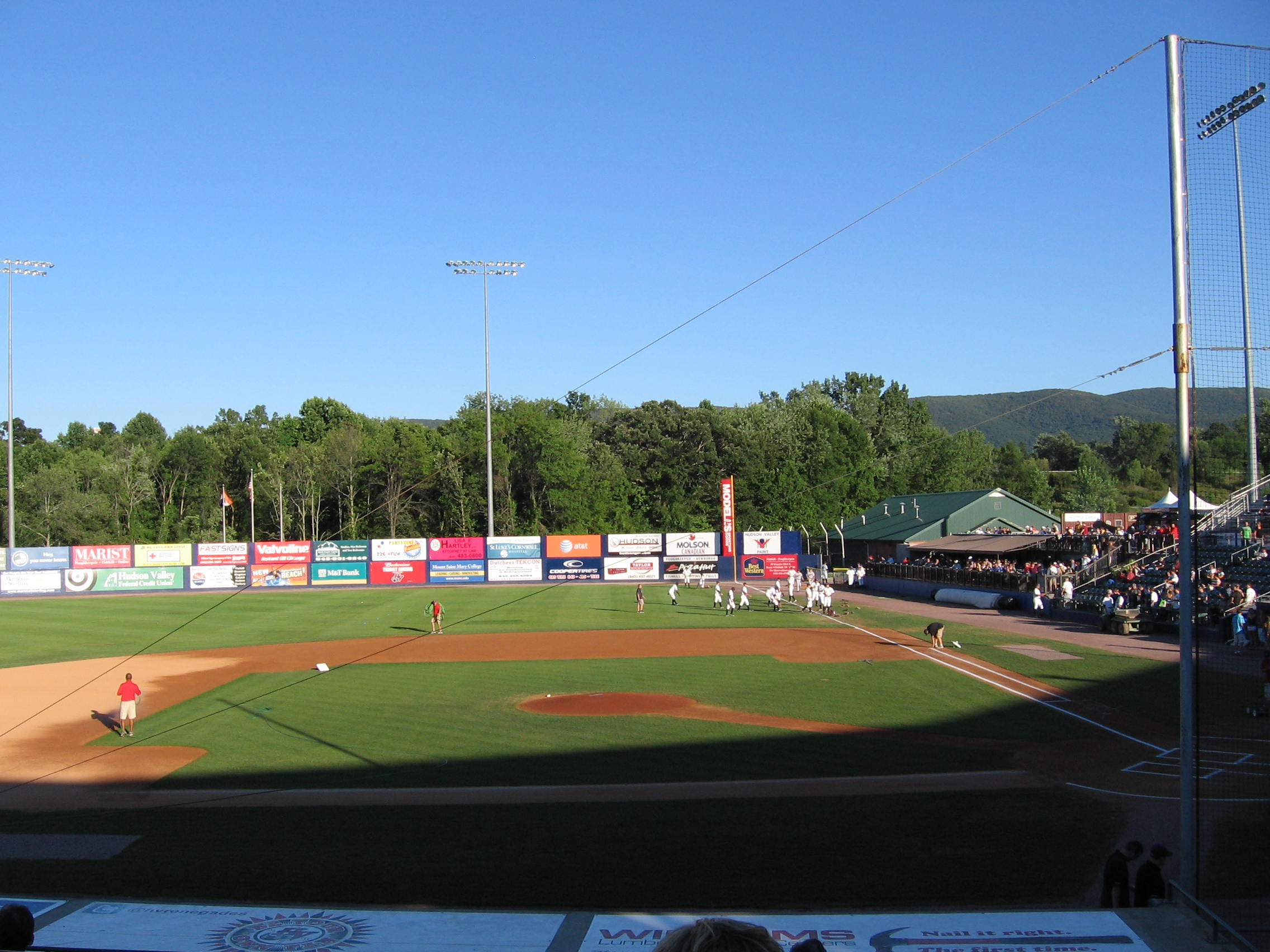
Heritage Financial Park (Hudson Valley Renegades)

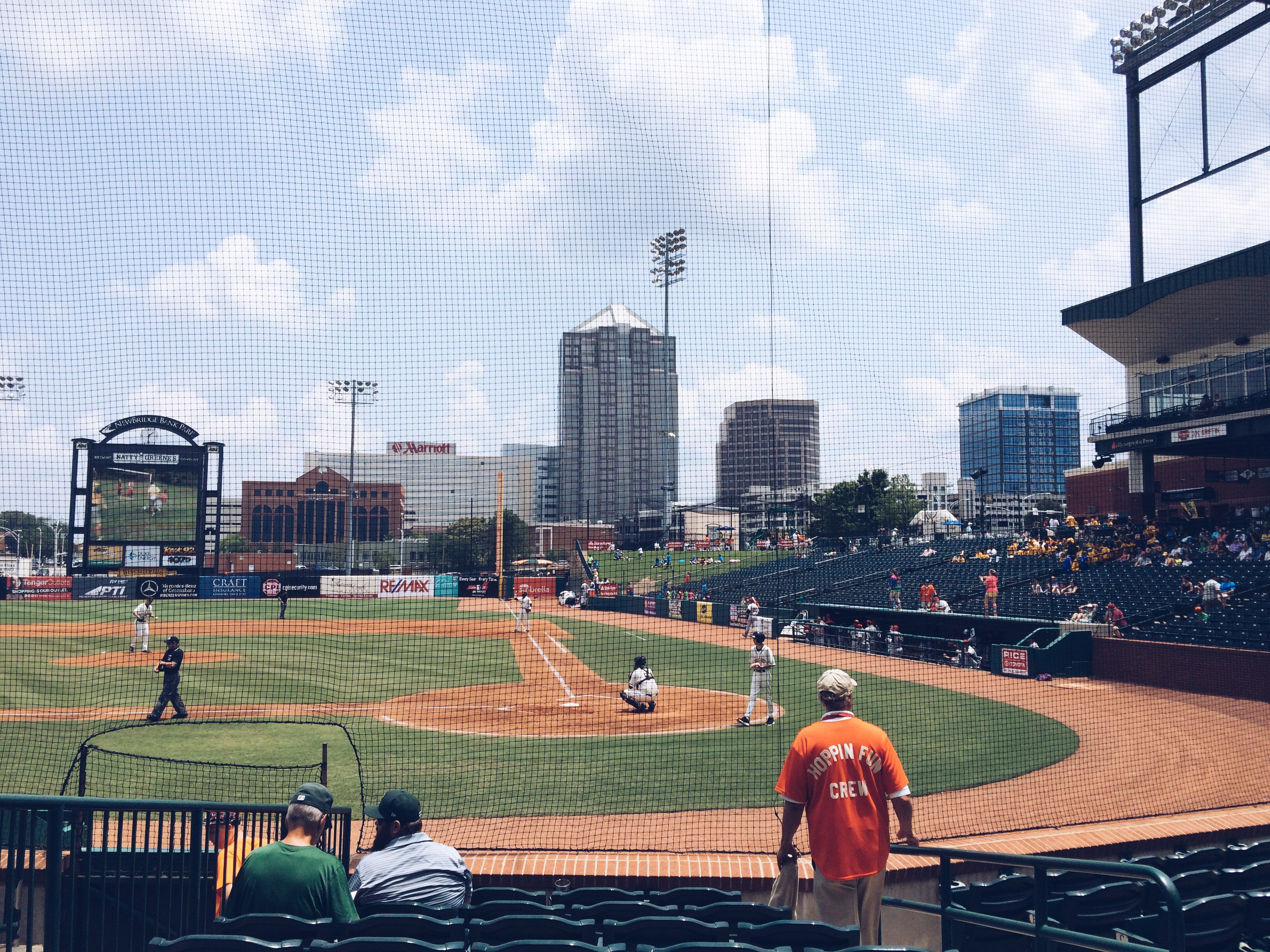
First National Bank Field (Greensboro Grasshoppers)

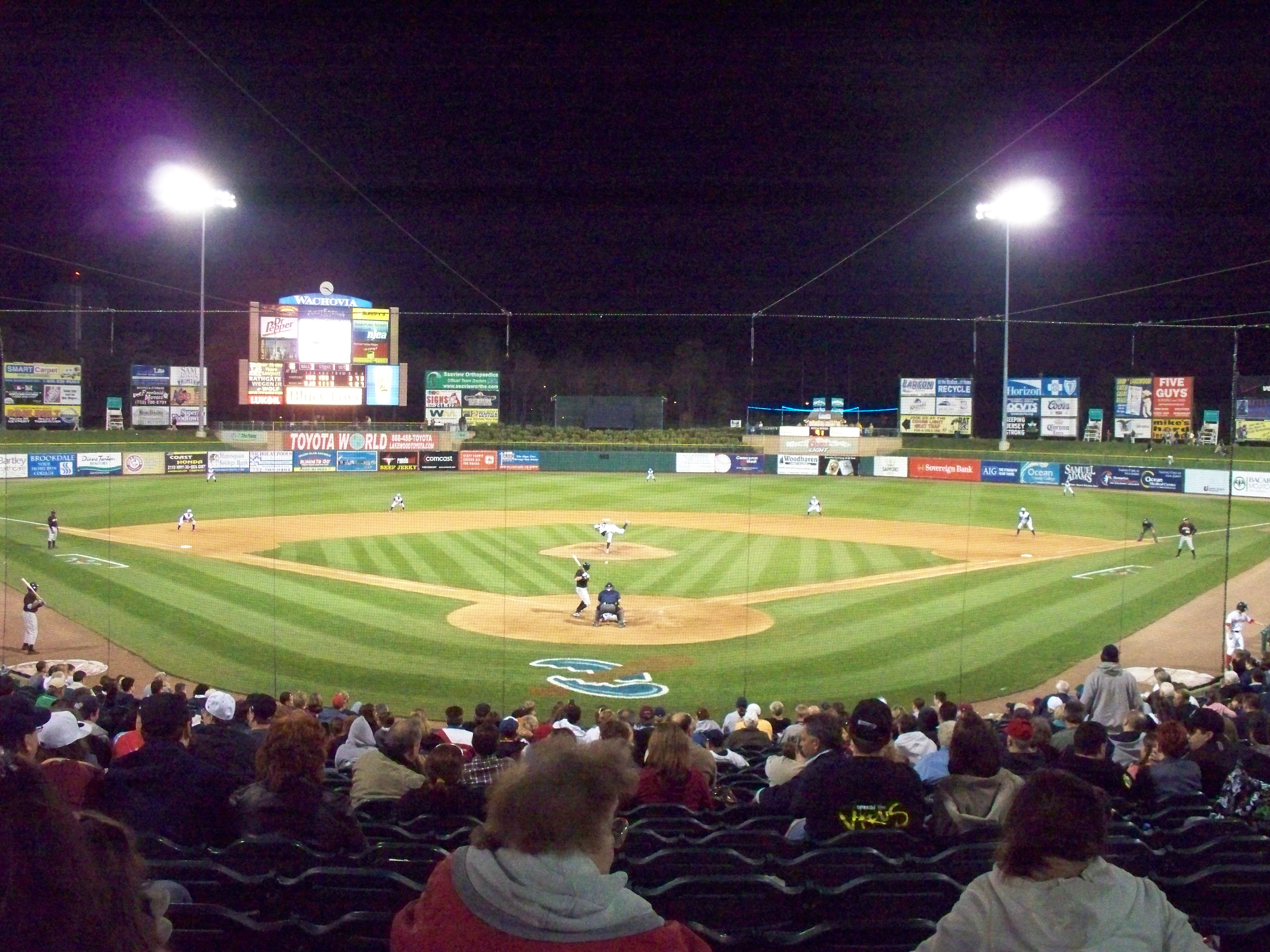
ShoreTown Ballpark (Jersey Shore BlueClaws)

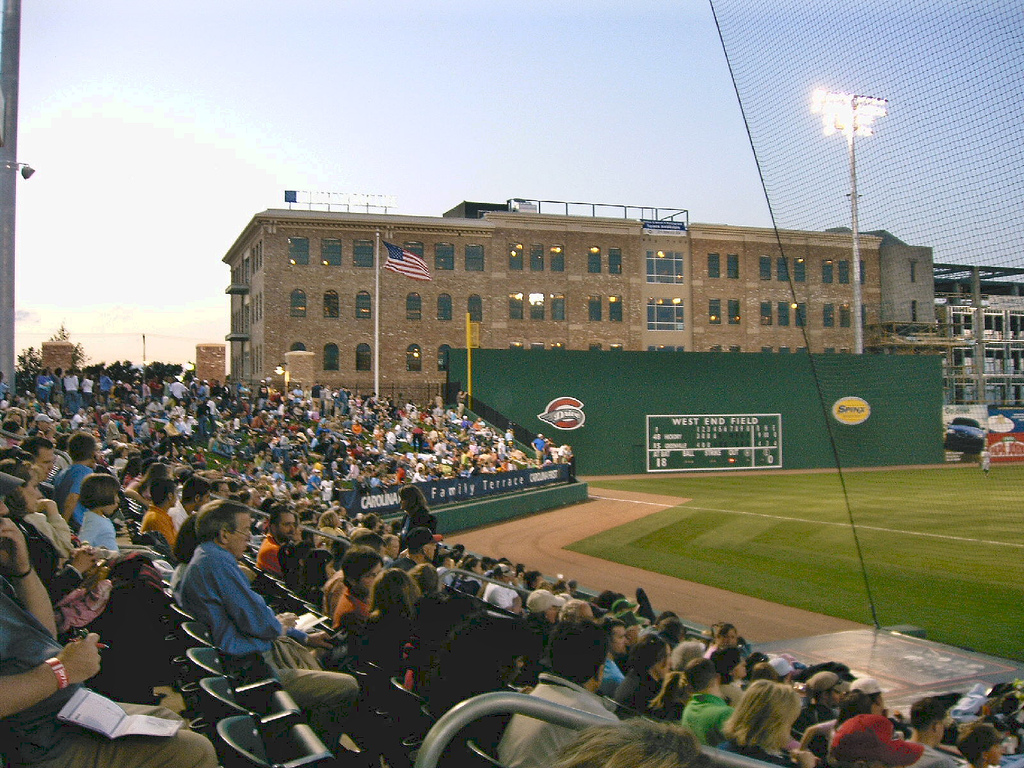
Fluor Field at the West End (Greenville Drive)

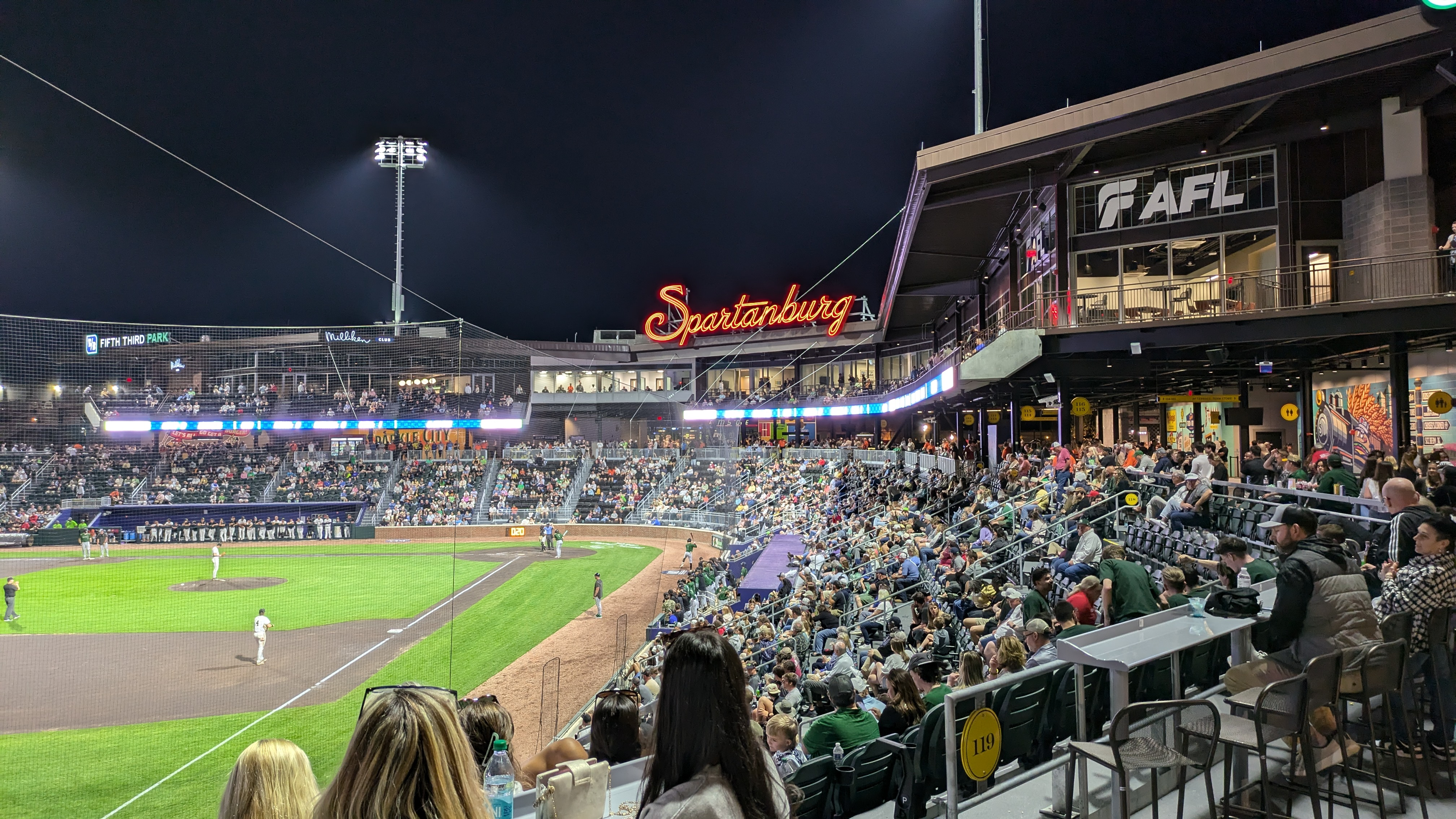
Fifth Third Park (Hub City Spartanburgers)

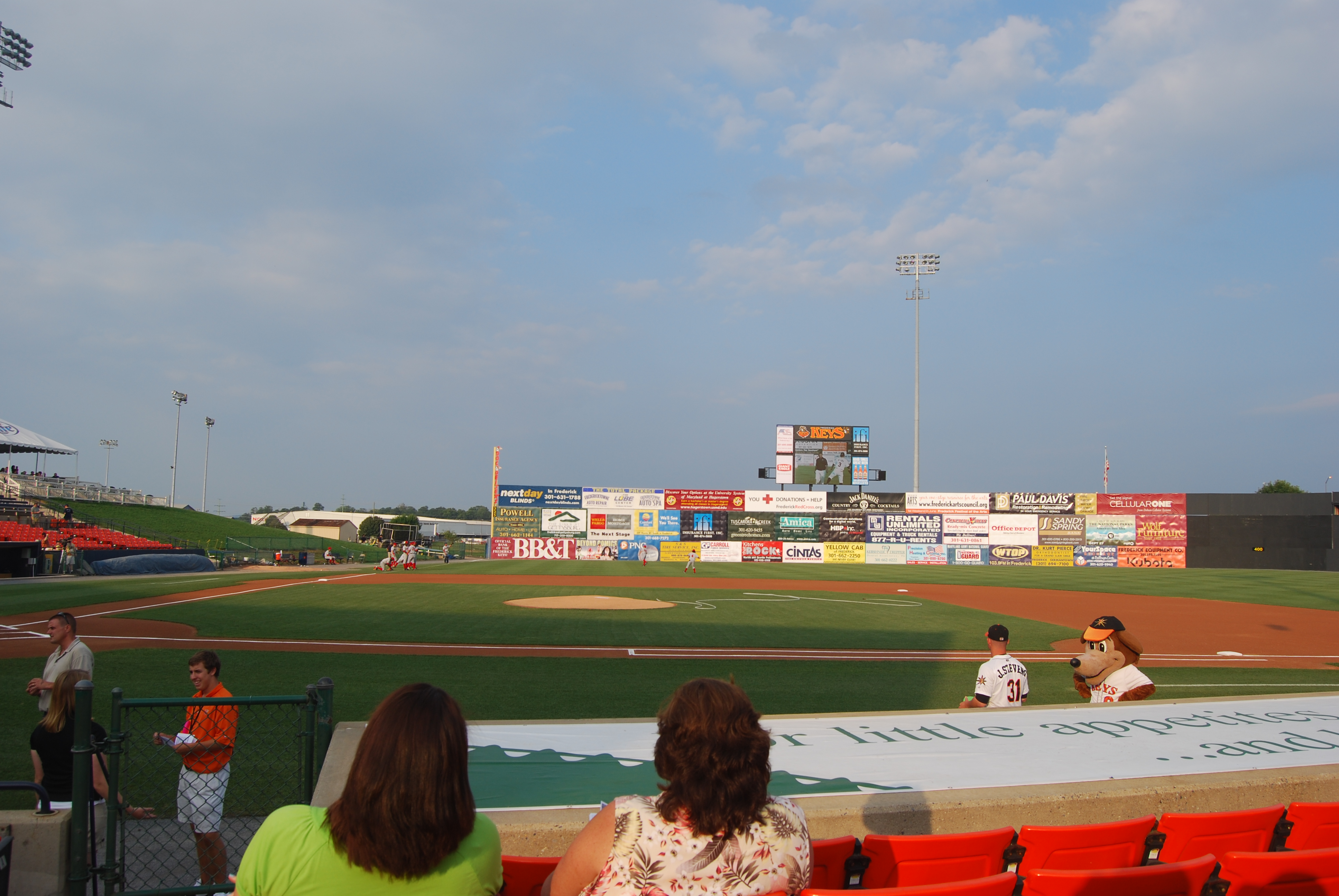
Harry Grove Stadium (Frederick Keys)

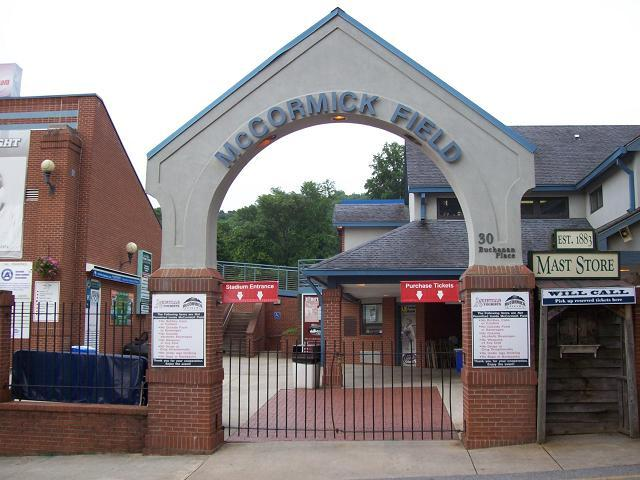
HomeTrust Park (Asheville Tourists)

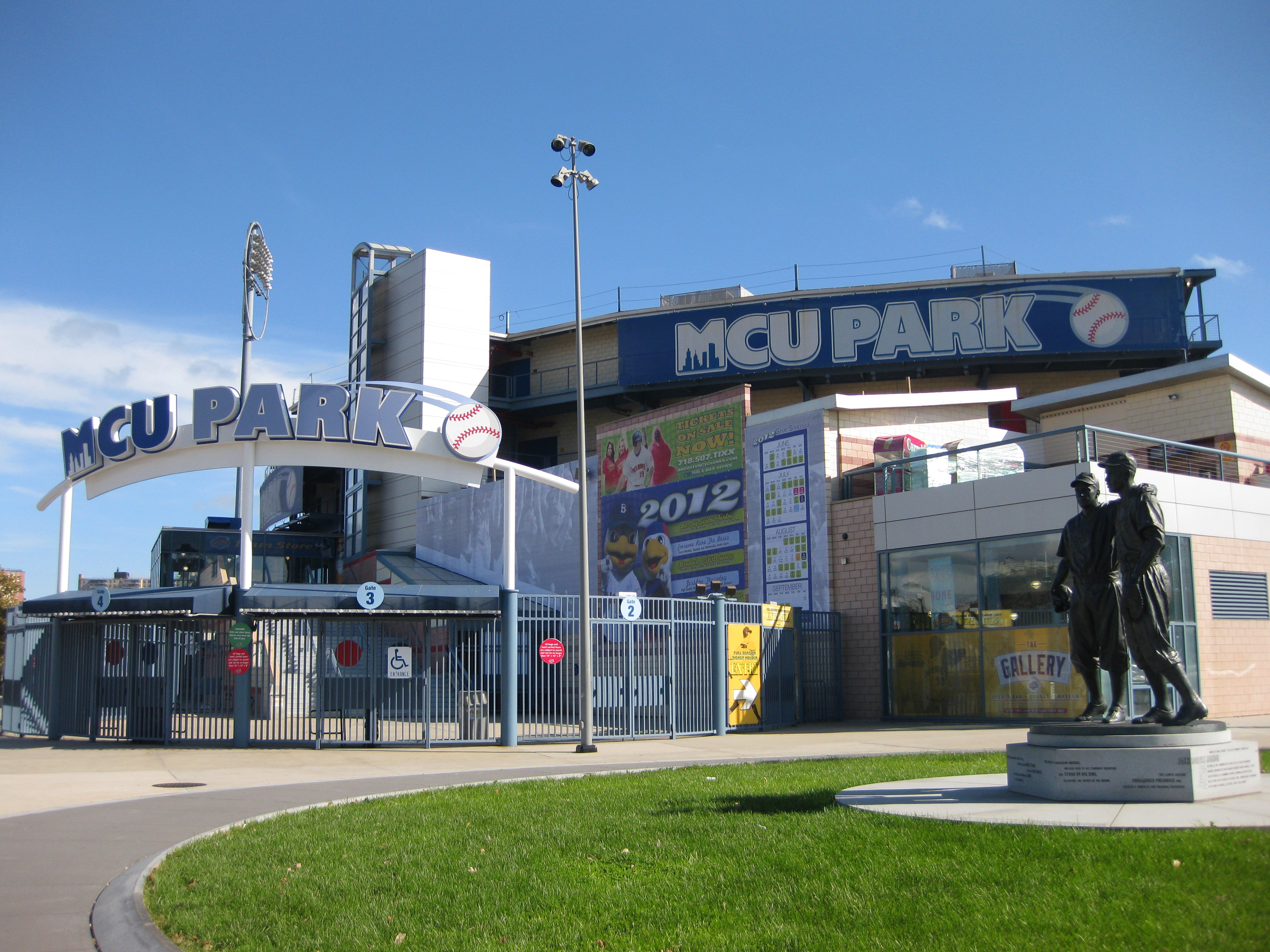
Maimonides Park (Brooklyn Cyclones)

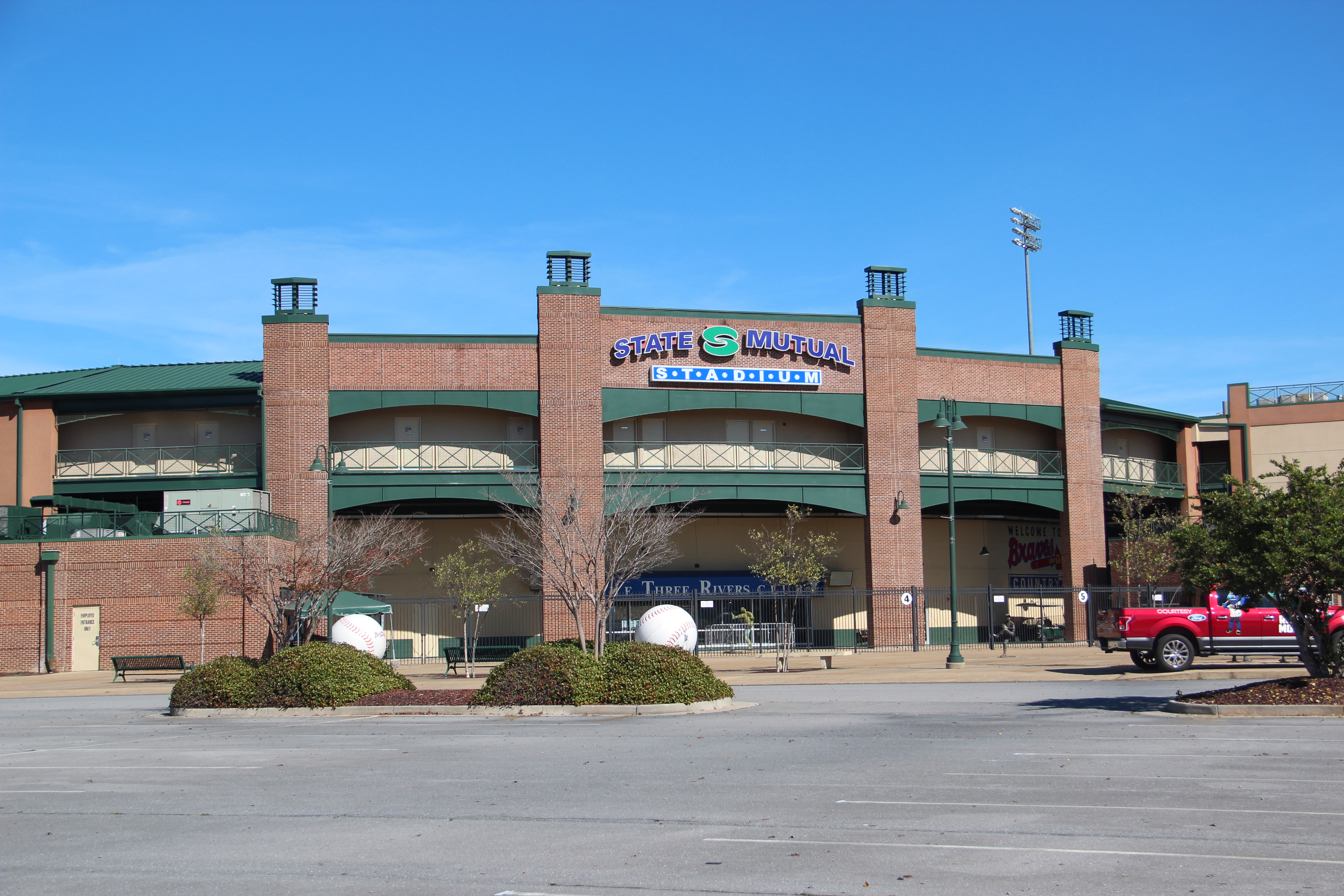
AdventHealth Stadium (Rome Emperors)

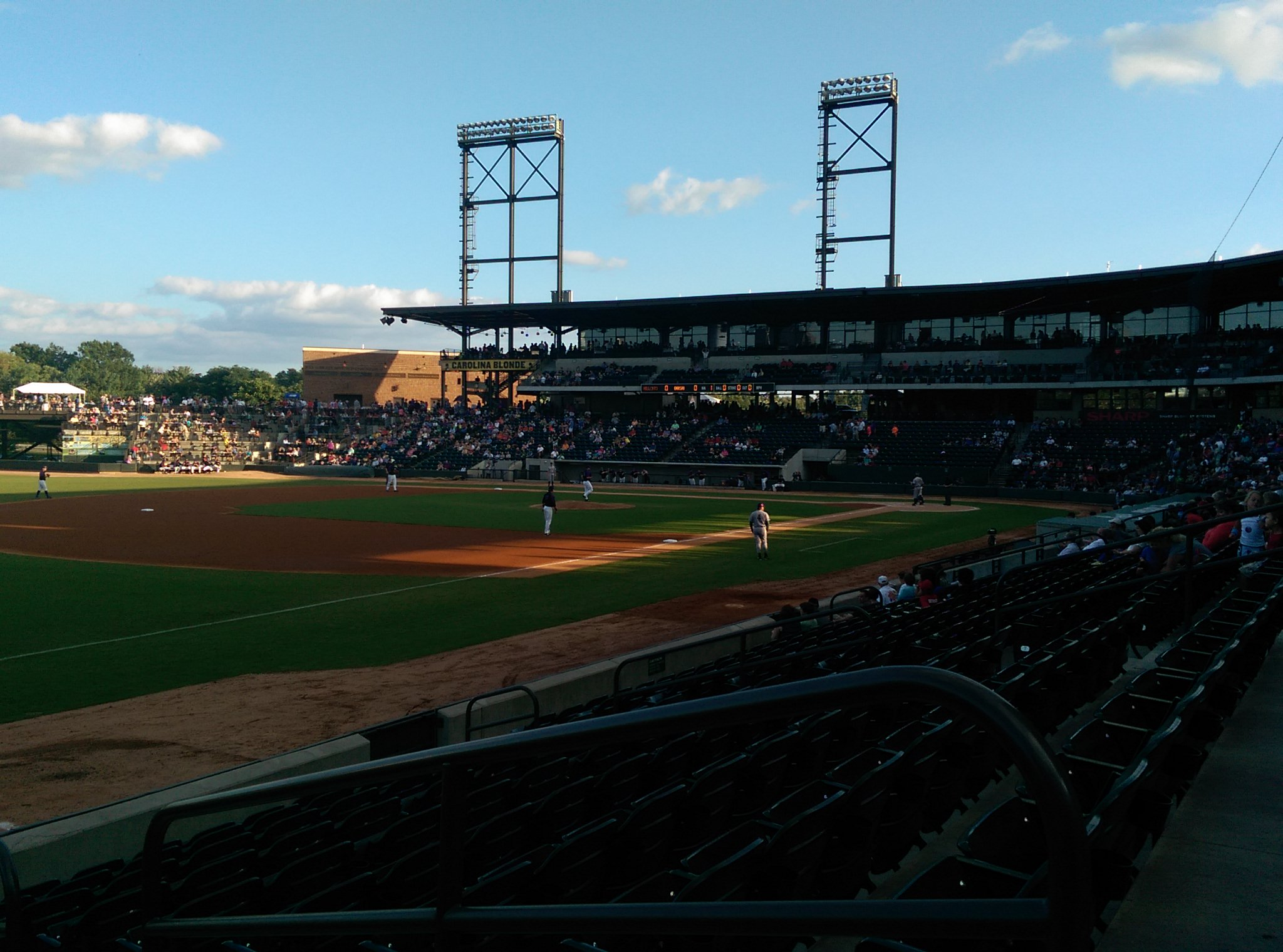
Truist Stadium (Winston-Salem Dash)

== See also ==
- List of Major League Baseball stadiums
- List of Triple-A baseball stadiums
- List of Double-A baseball stadiums
- List of Single-A baseball stadiums
- List of Rookie baseball stadiums

== General reference ==
- "Get to know the teams in the High-A Central". MiLB.com. April 14, 2021.
- "Get to know the teams in the High-A West". MiLB.com. April 21, 2021.
- "Get to know the teams in the High-A East". MiLB.com. April 7, 2021.
