= Texas Rangers minor league players =

Below are select minor league players and the rosters of the minor league affiliates of the Texas Rangers:

== Players ==
=== Wilian Bormie ===
Wilian Bormie

Texas Rangers
- Pitcher
- Born: April 7, 2001 (age 25); Barahona, Dominican Republic
- Bats: Right Throws: Right

Wilian Bormie (born April 7, 2001) is a Dominican professional baseball pitcher in the Texas Rangers organization.

Bormie signed as an international free agent with the Texas Rangers organization on December 28, 2019. He did not play professionally until 2022, when he played for the DSL Rangers of the Rookie-level Dominican Summer League, going 0–0 with a 2.57 ERA and 10 strikeouts over 7 innings. He split the 2023 season between the ACL Rangers of the Rookie-level Arizona Complex League and the Down East Wood Ducks of the Low-A Carolina League, going a combined 2–1 with a 4.83 ERA and 40 strikeouts over 31 2/3 innings. He returned to Down East for 2024, going 6–3 with a 3.47 ERA and 96 strikeouts over 80 1/3 innings. Bormie split the 2025 season between the Hub City Spartanburgers of the High-A South Atlantic League, and the Frisco RoughRiders of the Double-A Texas League, going a combined 4–6 with a 2.97 ERA and 90 strikeouts over 63 2/3 innings. He opened the 2026 season back with Frisco.

- Career statistics from MLB · ESPN · Baseball Reference (Minors)

=== Yolfran Castillo ===
Yolfran Castillo

Texas Rangers
- Shortstop
- Born: February 8, 2007 (age 19); Barquisimeto, Venezuela
- Bats: Right Throws: Right

Yolfran Andres Castillo (born February 8, 2007) is a Venezuelan professional baseball shortstop in the Texas Rangers organization.

Castillo signed with the Texas Rangers as an international free agent in January 2024. He played his first professional season with the Dominican Summer League Rangers and Arizona Complex League Rangers.

Castillo played 2025 with the ACL Rangers and Hickory Crawdads.

- Career statistics from Baseball Reference (Minors)

=== Aidan Curry ===
Aidan Curry

Texas Rangers
- Pitcher
- Born: July 25, 2002 (age 24); Ossining, New York, U.S.
- Bats: Right Throws: Right

Aidan Curry (born July 25, 2002) is an American professional baseball pitcher for the Texas Rangers of Major League Baseball (MLB).

Curry attended Fordham Preparatory School in the Bronx, New York City. Curry had committed to play college baseball at Bucknell University. Curry had his senior season of high school in 2020 wiped out due to the response to COVID-19 pandemic. Curry went undrafted in the shortened five-round 2020 MLB draft. Instead, he signed as an undrafted free agent with the Texas Rangers for a $20,000 signing bonus.

Curry made his professional debut in 2021 with the ACL Rangers of the Rookie-level Arizona Complex League, going 0–1 with a 13.79 ERA and 23 strikeouts over 15 2/3 innings. He split the 2022 season between the ACL Rangers and the Down East Wood Ducks of the Low-A Carolina League, going a combined 1–1 with a 4.23 ERA and 56 strikeouts over 36 1/3 innings. Curry split the 2023 season between Down East and the Hickory Crawdads of the High-A South Atlantic League, going a combined 6–3 with a 2.75 ERA and 104 strikeouts over 88 1/3 innings.

On October 30, the Rangers selected his contract to the 40-man roster.

- Career statistics from MLB · ESPN · Baseball Reference (Minors)

=== David Davalillo ===
David Davalillo

Texas Rangers – No. 72
- Pitcher
- Born: September 21, 2002 (age 24); Ocumare del Tuy, Venezuela
- Bats: Right Throws: Right

David Alejandro Davalillo (born September 21, 2002) is a Venezuelan professional baseball pitcher for the Texas Rangers of Major League Baseball (MLB).

Davalillo signed with the New York Mets as an international free agent in January 2021, and was released in 2022 without pitching in any games with the organization. In June 2022, he signed a minor league contract with the Texas Rangers. He made his professional debut that year with the Dominican Summer League Rangers.

Davalillo pitched 2023 with the rookie-level Arizona Complex League Rangers and Down East Wood Ducks and 2024 with Down East and the Hickory Crawdads. He started 2025 with the Hub City Spartanburgers. Davalillo made 23 appearances (22 starts) for Hub City and the Double-A Frisco RoughRiders, posting a combined 6-4 record and 2.44 ERA with 126 strikeouts over 107 innings of work.

On November 18, 2025, Davalillo's contract was selected by Texas, in order to protect him from the Rule 5 draft. He was optioned to Double-A Frisco to begin the 2026 season.

- Career statistics from Baseball Reference (Minors)

=== Leandro López ===
Leandro López

Texas Rangers – No. 74
- Pitcher
- Born: June 17, 2002 (age 24); Bonao, Dominican Republic
- Bats: Right Throws: Right

Leandro José López (born June 17, 2002) is a Dominican professional baseball pitcher for the Texas Rangers of Major League Baseball (MLB).

Lopez signed as an international free agent with the Texas Rangers organization on January 15, 2021. He played for the DSL Rangers of the Rookie-level Dominican Summer League in his professional debut season of 2021, going 0–2 with a 5.02 ERA and 24 strikeouts over 14 1/3 innings. He returned to the DSL in 2022, going 1–1 with a 1.83 ERA and 63 strikeouts over 34 1/3 innings. He spent the 2023 season with the Down East Wood Ducks of the Low-A Carolina League, going 2–5 with a 3.32 ERA and 79 strikeouts over 57 innings. He spent the 2024 season with the Hickory Crawdads of the High-A South Atlantic League, going 1–1 with a 9.00 ERA and 15 strikeouts, over just 13 innings due to shoulder and elbow injuries. Following the 2024 season, he played for the Surprise Saguaros of the Arizona Fall League. Lopez opened the 2025 season with the Hub City Spartanburgers of the High-A South Atlantic League, going 2–4 with a 2.19 ERA and 73 strikeouts over 65 2/3 innings. He was promoted to the Frisco RoughRiders of the Double-A Texas League in July.

On November 18, 2025, López's contract was selected by Texas, in order to protect him from the Rule 5 draft. López was optioned to Double-A Frisco to begin the 2026 season.

Lopez went by the last name Calderón, until the 2024 season.

- Career statistics from MLB · Baseball Reference (Minors)

=== Hector Osorio ===
Hector Osorio

Texas Rangers
- Outfielder
- Born: April 6, 2005 (age 21); Coro, Venezuela
- Bats: Left Throws: Left

Hector Pablo Osorio (born April 6, 2005) is a Venezuelan professional baseball outfielder in the Texas Rangers organization.

Osorio signed as an international free agent with the Texas Rangers on January 16, 2022. He split the 2022 and 2023 seasons between the DSL Rangers of the Rookie-level Dominican Summer League, hitting .276/.462/.310 in 2022 and .293/.466/.376 with 1 home run and 29 RBI. He spent the 2024 season with the ACL Rangers of the Rookie-level Arizona Complex League, hitting 286/.456/.364 with 1 home run and 22 RBI. Osorio spent the 2025 season with the Hickory Crawdads of the High-A Carolina League, hitting .251/.393/.339 with 4 home runs and 43 RBI. Osorio split the 2026 season between Hickory and the Hub City Spartanburgers of the High-A South Atlantic League.

- Career statistics from MLB · ESPN · Baseball Reference (Minors)

=== Dalton Pence ===
Dalton Pence

Texas Rangers
- Pitcher
- Born: August 28, 2002 (age 24); Gastonia, North Carolina, U.S.
- Bats: Left Throws: Left

Dalton Glenn Pence (born August 28, 2002) is an American professional baseball pitcher in the Texas Rangers organization.

Pence attended Cherryville High School in Cherryville, North Carolina. Undrafted out of high school, he attended the University of North Carolina at Chapel Hill to play college baseball for the Tar Heels. Pence redshirted in 2022. Pence went 4–3 with a 3.88 ERA and 50 strikeouts over 48 2/3 innings in 2023, and played collegiate summer baseball with the Bourne Braves of the Cape Cod Baseball League. As a redshirt sophomore in 2024, Pence went 5–1 with a 2.45 ERA and 74 strikeouts over 58 2/3 innings. Pence was drafted by the Texas Rangers in 11th round of the 2024 MLB draft and signed for a $350,000 signing bonus.

Pence split the 2025 season between the Hickory Crawdads of the Single–A Carolina League and the Hub City Spartanburgers the High-A South Atlantic League, going a combined 4–4 with a 2.73 ERA and 103 strikeouts over 82 1/3 innings.

- Career statistics from MLB · ESPN · Baseball Reference (Minors)

=== Rafe Perich ===
Rafe Perich

Texas Rangers
- Infielder
- Born: August 28, 2002 (age 24); Allentown, Pennsylvania, U.S.
- Bats: Switch Throws: Right

Rafe Andrew Perich (born May 22, 2002) is an American professional baseball infielder in the Texas Rangers organization.

Perich attended Northwestern Lehigh High School in New Tripoli, Pennsylvania. Undrafted out of high school, he attended Lehigh University to play college baseball. His best season came as a junior in 2024, when he hit .382/.492/.572 with 6 home runs and 41 RBI. Perich was drafted by the Texas Rangers in the 7th round of the 2024 MLB draft, and signed with them.

Perich played in 9 games for the Down East Wood Ducks of the Low-A Carolina League in 2024. He split the 2025 season between the Hickory Crawdads of the Low-A Carolina League and the Hub City Spartanburgers of the High-A South Atlantic League, hitting a combined .231/.347/.330 with 6 home runs and 53 RBI. Perich opened the 2026 season back with Hub City, hitting .303/.394/.606 with 11 home runs and 53 RBI over 38 games. He was then promoted to the Frisco RoughRiders of the Double–A Texas League.

- Career statistics from MLB · ESPN · Baseball Reference (Minors)

=== Caden Scarborough ===
Caden Scarborough

Texas Rangers
- Pitcher
- Born: April 1, 2005 (age 21); Kissimmee, Florida, U.S.
- Bats: Right Throws: Right

Caden Michael Scarborough (born April 1, 2005) is an American professional baseball pitcher in the Texas Rangers organization.

Scarborough attended Harmony High School in Harmony, Florida. He was selected by the Texas Rangers in the sixth round of the 2023 Major League Baseball draft.

Scarborough spent his first professional season in 2024 with the Arizona Complex League Rangers and Down East Wood Ducks. He started 2025 with the Hickory Crawdads.

- Career statistics from Baseball Reference (Minors)

=== Josh Trentadue ===
Josh Trentadue

Texas Rangers
- Pitcher
- Born: January 25, 2002 (age 24); Richmond, Virginia, U.S.
- Bats: Left Throws: Left

Joshua Michael Trentadue (born January 25, 2002) is an American professional baseball pitcher in the Texas Rangers organization.

Trentadue attended Mills E. Godwin High School in Henrico, Virginia and played college baseball at Southern Virginia University and the College of Southern Idaho. He was selected by the Texas Rangers in the 14th round of the 2023 Major League Baseball draft.

Trentadue made his professional debut in 2023 with the Arizona Complex League Rangers and played 2024 with the Down East Wood Ducks. He started 2025 with the Hub City Spartanburgers before being promoted to the Frisco RoughRiders.

- Career statistics from Baseball Reference (Minors)

== Full Triple-A to Rookie League rosters ==
=== Triple-A ===
Round Rock Express roster
Players		Coaches/Other
Pitchers: 21 Wilian Bormie; -- Declan Cronin; -- Dylan File; 19 Janser Lara; 14 Ryan Lobus; 12 Dalton Pence; 16 Anthony Veneziano	Catchers: 5 Julian Brock; -- Cooper Johnson; Infielders: 24 Theo Hardy; 15 Keyber Rodriguez; 6 John Taylor; -- Max Wagner; Outfielders: 10 Aaron Zavala; Designated hitters: 22 Sebastian Walcott	Manager: 17 Kyle Moore; Coaches: 58 Dave Borkowski (pitching); 33 Kawika Emsley-Pai (development); 20 Chase Lambin (bench); 0 Matt Lawson (hitting); 99 Julio Valdez (bullpen); 7-day injured list; * On Texas Rangers 40-man roster; ~ Development list; # Rehab assignment; ∞ Reserve list; ‡ Restricted list; § Suspended list; † Temporarily inactive list; Roster updated November 18, 2026; Transactions; → More rosters: MiLB • Pacific Coast League; → Texas Rangers minor league players

=== Double-A ===
Frisco RoughRiders roster
Players		Coaches/Other
Pitchers: 19 Ismael Agreda; -- John Armstrong; 52 Jonathan Brand; 49 Joey Danielson; 30 J'Briell Easley; 57 Thomas Ireland; -- Larson Kindreich; -- Eric Loomis; 20 Brock Porter; 61 Cole Stasio; 23 Josh Trentadue; 14 Wily Villar; 67 Kai Wynyard	Catchers: -- Tucker Mitchell; 24 Ian Moller; 16 Malcolm Moore; 25 Juan Sulbaran; Infielders: 15 Arturo Disla; 56 Gleider Figuereo; 4 Luke Hanson; 38 Rafe Perich; Outfielders: 8 Dylan Dreiling; 11 Keith Jones II; 2 Paxton Kling; 6 Yeison Morrobel	Manager: 21 Chad Comer; Coaches: 48 Jason Hart (hitting); 31 Jorge Hernandez (development); 47 Thomas St. Clair (pitching); 9 Jay Sullenger (development); 7-day injured list; * On Texas Rangers 40-man roster; ~ Development list; # Rehab assignment; ∞ Reserve list; ‡ Restricted list; § Suspended list; † Temporarily inactive list; Roster updated November 13, 2026; Transactions; → More rosters: MiLB • Texas League; → Texas Rangers minor league players

=== High-A ===
Hub City Spartanburgers roster
Players		Coaches/Other
Pitchers: -- Juan Arnaud; 6 Anthony Astudillo; -- Paul Bonzagni; 47 Aidan Brainard; -- Kolton Curtis; 31 Ben DeTaeye; -- Brooks Fowler; 17 Jesus Gamez; 8 Frank Martinez; 18 Case Matter; 33 Luimy Munoz; 14 Jormy Nivar; 23 Kamdyn Perry; 61 Owen Proksch; -- Luis Ramirez; 43 Cole Roland; 53 AJ Russell; -- Julius Sanchez; 1 Luke Savage; 77 Caden Scarborough; 37 Enrique Segura; 13 Anthony Susac; -- Izack Tiger	Catchers: 4 Arturo De Freitas; 20 Neurelin Montero; 90 Cal Stark; Infielders: 12 Casey Cook; 5 Carter Garate; 22 Antonis Macias; 3 Esteban Mejia; 11 Evan Morrison; Outfielders: -- Anthony Gutierrez; 27 Maxton Martin; -- Hector Osorio; 2 Chandler Pollard; 19 Quincy Scott; -- Marcos Torres	Manager: 30 Carlos Maldonado; Coaches: 16 Jorge Cortes (development); 28 Landon Lassiter (development); 36 Mason Milkey (pitching); 00 Brian Pozos (hitting); 7-day injured list; * On Texas Rangers 40-man roster; ~ Development list; # Rehab assignment; ∞ Reserve list; ‡ Restricted list; § Suspended list; † Temporarily inactive list; Roster updated November 15, 2026; Transactions; → More rosters: MiLB • South Atlantic League; → Texas Rangers minor league players

=== Single-A ===
Hickory Crawdads roster
Players		Coaches/Other
Pitchers: 22 Keiber Armas; 32 Jake Barbee; 48 Alejandro Chiquillo; -- Aidan Deakins; 36 Cole Fehrman; 25 Brandon Jaenke; 43 Jacob Johnson; -- Daniel Keaney; 33 Jesus Lafalaise; 17 Louis Marinaro; -- Mason McConnaughey; 46 J. D. McReynolds; 37 Aneudis Mejia; 41 Moises Morales; -- Alberto Mota; 24 Connor O'Hara; 11 Josh Owens (two-way); 19 William Privette; 40 Geury Rodriguez; 12 Evan Siary; 45 Michael Trausch; 15 Will Whelan	Catchers: 38 Sebastian Baquera; 44 Noah Franklin; -- Jesus Lopez; 8 Josh Springer; Infielders: 5 Kolby Branch; 3 Yolfran Castillo; 35 Brandon Crabtree; 16 Daniel Flames; 28 Seong-Jun Kim (two-way); 14 Curley Martha; Outfielders: 18 Marco Argudin; 6 Kaden Carpenter; 21 Jay McQueen; 20 Paulino Santana; 9 Deward Tovar; Designated hitters: 27 Pablo Guerrero	Manager: 2 Nick Janssen; Coaches: 4 Elevys Gonzalez (development); 47 Herbert Iser (development); 1 Carlisle Koestler (pitching); 30 Daniel Padilla (hitting); 7-day injured list; * On Texas Rangers 40-man roster; ~ Development list; # Rehab assignment; ∞ Reserve list; ‡ Restricted list; § Suspended list; † Temporarily inactive list; Roster updated November 2, 2026; Transactions; → More rosters: MiLB • Carolina League; → Texas Rangers minor league players

=== Rookie ===
Arizona Complex League Rangers roster
Players		Coaches/Other
Pitchers: 51 Ben Abeldt; -- Caden Aoki; -- Landon Brewer; -- Brody Bumila; -- Hudson Calhoun; -- Alfredo Capacete; -- Collin Cobb; -- Jose Cordova; 36 Cory Geinzer; 70 Diego Lanzosa; 45 Enyel Lopez; -- Gilberto Lopez; -- Jackson Nash; 67 Miguel Neira; -- Bernardo Rivera; -- Gio Rojas	Catchers: -- Karson Bowen; -- Max Kaufer; -- Francisco Perez; -- Mito Perez; 13 Javier Sanchez; 14 Carlos Torres; Infielders: 35 Santiago Almao; -- Michael Anderson Jr. (two-way); -- Connor Comeau; -- Wailele Kane-Yates; 1 Daniel Rodriguez; 22 Jack Wheeler; Outfielders: 43 Joaquin Arias Jr.; 94 Braulio Cavero; -- Jordan Hawkins; 4 Rashawn Pinder; 23 Manni Ramirez; 44 Elorky Rodriguez	Manager: 27 Esteban Cardoza-Oquendo; Coaches: 99 Sharnol Adriana (hitting); 30 Alvaro Castillo (pitching); 15 Wes Hunt (development); 18 Landon Hutchison (pitching); 28 Trey Newman (development); 60 Guilder Rodríguez (bench); 98 Austin Turner (hitting); 19 Zach Woolard (pitching); 7-day injured list; * On Texas Rangers 40-man roster; ~ Development list; # Rehab assignment; ∞ Reserve list; ‡ Restricted list; § Suspended list; † Temporarily inactive list; Roster updated November 2, 2026; → More rosters: MiLB • Arizona Complex League; → Texas Rangers minor league players

=== Foreign Rookie ===
Dominican Summer League Rangers Blue roster
Players		Coaches/Other
Pitchers: 38 Alex Acosta; 48 Isaias Acosta; 55 Jostin Alcantara; 33 Jean Ballesteros; 45 Kevin Colmenares; 57 Albert Cordero; -- Ayverson Echenique; 52 Breyner Figuereo; 17 Manuel Gamez; 65 Carlos Lara; 25 Edgar Liriano; 51 Juan Medina; 40 Eddy Peralta; 9 Frandel Pineda; 46 Yadiel Roquez; 53 Aneudy Santos; 50 Jose Silvestre	Catchers: 18 Frainker Benitez; 3 Jose Marcano; 37 Santiago Ramirez; Infielders: 13 Ariel Abreu; 41 Yeisy Celesten; 19 Víctor Gonzalez; 16 Luis Jaquez; 2 Cesar Mateo; 24 Darling Montero; 1 Raul Pereira; 27 Elian Rosario; 20 Jhon Simon; Outfielders: 21 Wesly Castillo; 28 Jesus Chavez; 15 Carlos Done; 32 Oliver Guerrero; 7 Saivel Zayas	Manager: -- Marty Pitts; Coaches: 7-day injured list; * On Texas Rangers 40-man roster; ~ Development list; # Rehab assignment; ∞ Reserve list; ‡ Restricted list; § Suspended list; † Temporarily inactive list; Roster updated November 2, 2026; → More rosters: MiLB • Dominican Summer League; → Texas Rangers minor league players

Dominican Summer League Rangers Red roster
Players		Coaches/Other
Pitchers: -- Jose Alvarado; -- Jason Alvarez; 31 Jeyson Bautista; 32 Abner Bello; 30 Albert Castillo; 33 Frederik Dolsi; 51 Jehiber Fernandez; 12 Masahiro Fukuda; 34 Nestor Gonzalez; -- Christopher Hernandez; 52 Alex Lamu; 53 Eithan Mendez; -- Ronaiker Narvaez; 49 Juan Perez; 9 Mauricio Ramirez; 39 Daniel Ramos	Catchers: 6 Jesus Flores; 13 Juan Mosqueda; 23 Abel Valdes; Infielders: 2 David Diaz; 41 David Ortiz Jr.; 50 Jayln Pinder; Outfielders: 4 Luis Cedeno; 8 Jhostin Genao; 22 Santiago Rivas; 37 Alex Rodriguez; 6 Victor Rodriguez	Manager: -- Carlos Paulino; Coaches: -- Alexis Infante (bench); -- Matt Rabe (pitching); -- Wilton Veras (hitting); 7-day injured list; * On Texas Rangers 40-man roster; ~ Development list; # Rehab assignment; ∞ Reserve list; ‡ Restricted list; § Suspended list; † Temporarily inactive list; Roster updated November 2, 2026; → More rosters: MiLB • Dominican Summer League; → Texas Rangers minor league players

== Player Development Staff ==
The Rangers' Player Development staff consists of:

- Field/Infield: Kenny Holmberg
- Assistant Field: Nick Janssen
- Pitching: Jon Goebel
- Assistant Pitching: Thomas St. Clair
- Hitting: Tyler Wolfe
- Assistant Hitting: Jared Walker
- Catching: Kevin Torres
- Video: Hunter Schneider
