= Malcolm Moore (baseball) =

American baseball player (born 2003)

Texas Rangers
- Catcher
- Born: July 31, 2003 (age 23); Sacramento, California, U.S.
- Bats: Left Throws: Right
- Stats at Baseball Reference

Malcolm Moore (born July 31, 2003) is an American professional baseball catcher in the Texas Rangers organization. He played college baseball for the Stanford Cardinal. He was selected with the 30th overall pick in the 1st round of the 2024 MLB draft.

== Amateur career ==
Moore grew up in Sacramento, California and attended C. K. McClatchy High School. As a junior, he hit for a .535 average with 38 hits, 55 RBIs and seven home runs and was named the California Gatorade Player of the Year. Moore was also Gatorade Player of the Year as a senior, after batting .500 with 15 doubles and 13 home runs. Moore committed to play college baseball at Stanford. Moore was considered a top-100 prospect for the 2022 Major League Baseball draft but was not selected. He played summer collegiate baseball after graduating high school for the Bellingham Bells of the West Coast League, where he batted .400 with 20 hits and 12 RBIs in 13 games played.

Moore began his freshman season at Stanford in 2023 as the Cardinal's starting catcher. In Stanford's season-opening series against Cal State Fullerton, he went 5-for-15 with three home runs and five RBIs over three games. He hit .311 with 15 home runs and 63 RBIs over 64 games for the season, and was named the Pac-12 Conference Freshman of the Year. As a sophomore in 2024, he batted .255 with 16 home runs and 36 RBIs across 54 games.

== Professional career ==
The Texas Rangers selected Moore 30th overall in the 2024 Major League Baseball draft. He signed with Texas on July 24, 2024, for a $3 million signing bonus.

Moore made his professional debut after signing with the Hickory Crawdads, batting .209 with three home runs across 25 games. To open the 2025 season, he was assigned to the Hub City Spartanburgers. He suffered a broken finger from a foul tip and missed nearly two months, and rehabbed with the Arizona Complex League Rangers before returning to Hub City. Over 62 games played, Moore hit .195 with three home runs and 27 RBIs. After the season, he played in the Arizona Fall League with the Surprise Saguaros and batted .213 across 17 games. Moore opened the 2026 season with Hub City and was promoted to the Frisco RoughRiders in June.
