= Hub City Spartanburgers =

- Founded in 2025; Spartanburg, South Carolina
Team logo
Cap insignia

Minor league affiliations
- Class: High-A (2025–present)
- League: South Atlantic League (2025–present)
- Division: South Division

Major league affiliations
- Team: Texas Rangers (2025–present)

Minor league titles
- Division titles (1): 2025
- Wild card berths (1): 2025

Team data
- Name: Hub City Spartanburgers (2025–present)
- Colors: Navy blue, bright green, red, tan, yellow
- Ballpark: Fifth Third Park (from 2025)
- Owner/ Operator: Diamond Baseball Holdings
- General manager: Tyson Jeffers
- Manager: Carlos Maldonado
- Website: milb.com/hub-city

The Hub City Spartanburgers are a Minor League Baseball (MiLB) team of the South Atlantic League and the High-A affiliate of the Texas Rangers. They are located in Spartanburg, South Carolina. They started playing their home games on April 15, 2025, at Fifth Third Park, which opened in 2025 and holds 5,000 people.

== History ==
In May 2023, Diamond Baseball Holdings bought the Down East Wood Ducks of the Single-A Carolina League and announced that the team would move for the 2025 season to a new ballpark to be built in Spartanburg, South Carolina. Tyson Jeffers was announced as Spartanburg's first general manager in October 2023. Renaming of the team to Hub City Spartanburgers was announced in May 2024. In July 2024, MiLB announced that the team would be promoted to class High-A, joining the South Atlantic League while remaining an affiliate of the Texas Rangers. Chad Comer was announced as Spartanburg's first manager in January 2025.

The Spartanburgers won 4-3 in their inaugural game over the Aberdeen IronBirds on April 4, 2025, at Aberdeen's Leidos Field at Ripken Stadium.

== Roster ==
Hub City Spartanburgers roster
Players	Coaches/Other
Pitchers: -- Joe Adametz; 17 Ismael Agreda; -- Seth Clark; 18 Aidan Curry; -- Joey Danielson; -- J'Briell Easley; 13 Mailon Felix; 61 Jesus Gamez; -- Anthony Hoopii-Tuionetoa; -- Thomas Ireland; 28 Dylan MacLean; 31 Case Matter; 14 D. J. McCarty; 36 Dalton Pence; 33 Brock Porter; -- Luis Ramirez; 16 Adrian Rodriguez; -- Josh Sanders; -- Luke Savage; 11 Caden Scarborough; -- Enrique Segura; 22 Victor Simeon; -- Cole Stasio; 35 Anthony Susac; -- Paxton Thompson; 20 Adonis Villavicencio; -- Kai Wynyard; Catchers: 88 Ben Hartl; 27 Malcolm Moore; 15 Cal Stark; Infielders: -- Danyer Cueva; 23 Arturo Disla; 1 Gleider Figuereo; 3 Luke Hanson; 9 Rafe Perich; -- Chandler Pollard; 5 John Taylor; Outfielders: 8 Dylan Dreiling; -- Anthony Gutierrez; 25 Paxton Kling; 12 Antonis Macias; 24 Maxton Martin; 6 Yeison Morrobel; 19 Quincy Scott	Manager: -- Carlos Maldonado; Coaches: -- Jorge Cortes (development); -- Landon Lassiter (development); -- Mason Milkey (pitching); -- Brian Pozos (hitting); 28 Drew Sannes (hitting); 60-day injured list: -- Paul Bonzagni; 2 Casey Cook; 30 Kolton Curtis (full season); 37 Brooks Fowler; -- Izack Tiger; 7-day injured list; * On Texas Rangers 40-man roster; ~ Development list; # Rehab assignment; ∞ Reserve list; ‡ Restricted list; § Suspended list; † Temporarily inactive list; Roster updated March 29, 2026; Transactions; → More rosters: MiLB • South Atlantic League; → Texas Rangers minor league players
