= Fifth Third Park =

Stadium in Spartanburg, South Carolina

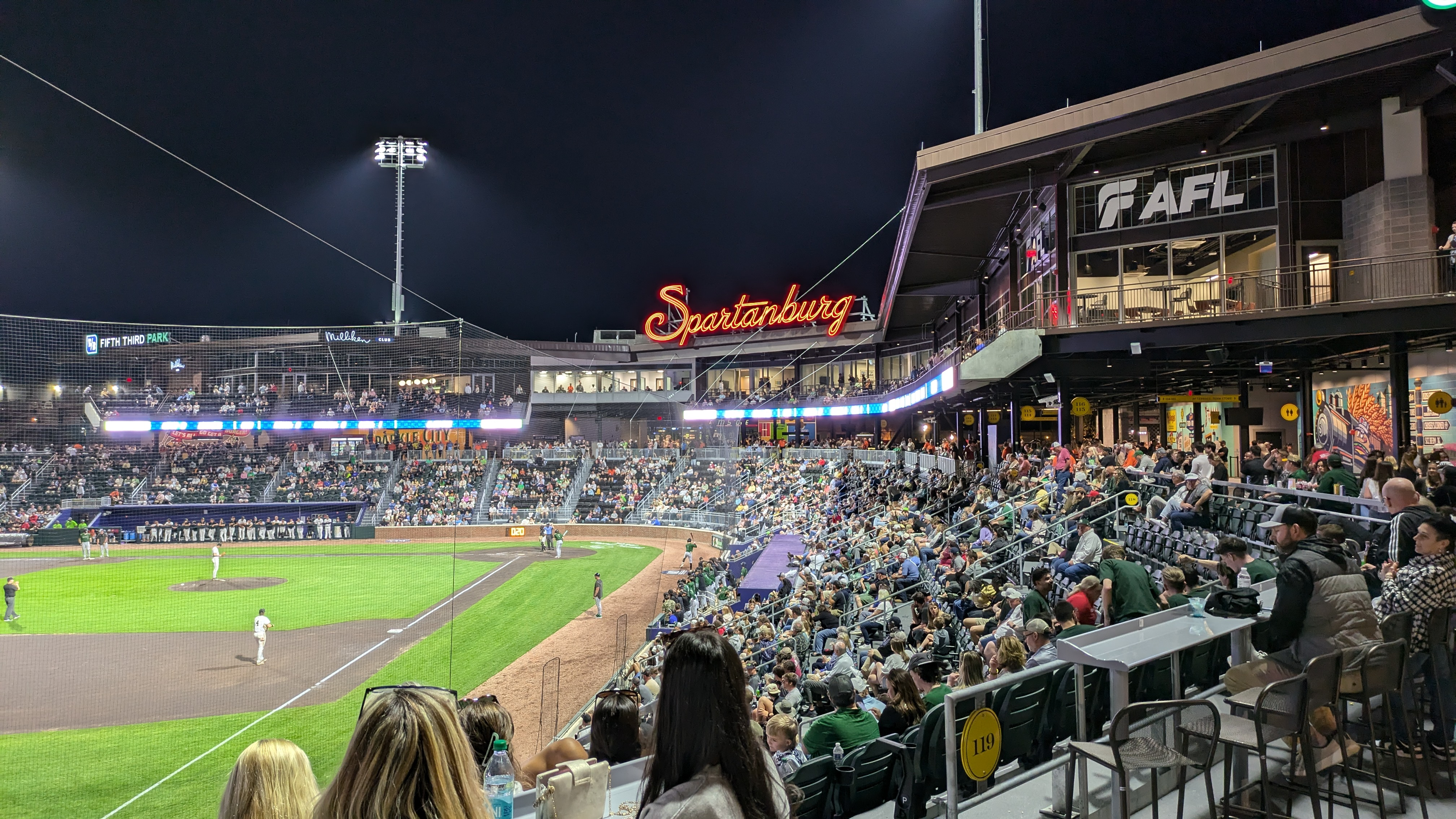

- Location within South Carolina Location within the United States
- Interactive map of Fifth Third Park
- Location: 300 W. Henry Street; Spartanburg, South Carolina 29306
- Coordinates: 34°56′42″N 81°56′09″W
- Owner: City of Spartanburg
- Operator: Diamond Baseball Holdings
- Capacity: 5,250 (3,500 seated)
- Surface: Grass
- Record attendance: 5,121
- Field size: Left Field: 328 ft (100 m); Center Field: 410 ft (120 m); Right Field: 327 ft (100 m)

Construction
- Groundbreaking: November 1, 2023
- Built: 2023–2025
- Opened: April 1, 2025
- Cost: $75 million
- Architect: McMillan Pazdan Smith Architects
- Project manager: The Johnson Group
- General contractors: Robins & Morton

Tenant
- Hub City Spartanburgers (SAL) (2025–present)

Website
- Official website

Fifth Third Park is a baseball stadium in Spartanburg, South Carolina.

The stadium was built primarily for the Hub City Spartanburgers, the relocated and renamed Down East Wood Ducks of the Carolina League, who replaced the Hickory Crawdads in the South Atlantic League (SAL). It is also intended to host other sports, outdoor concerts, festivals and community events. The ballpark is part of a larger $425 million mixed-use development on a 16-acre site at the western edge of downtown, which will include more than 375 luxury apartments, a 150-room hotel, 200,000 square feet of office space, parking for at least 1,500 vehicles, and a public plaza.

The Johnson Group oversaw development of the ballpark. McMillan Pazdan Smith was the architect of record, and Robins & Morton was the general contractor. The stadium is owned by the City of Spartanburg.

The capacity is 5,250 total (3,500 seated) for baseball games. The stadium has 12 premium suites, a 7,000 square foot club/multi-purpose event space, concourse level boxes and an outfield berm in deep left field.

A groundbreaking ceremony was held on November 1, 2023, where Fifth Third Bank was announced as the ballpark naming rights sponsor. The facility opened to the public on April 1, 2025, with a game between the Wofford College Terriers and the USC Upstate Spartans. The Terriers defeated the Spartans 5-2 in front of a crowd of 3,662. The Spartanburgers' first home game at the ballpark on April 15, 2025, was a 5-3 victory over the Bowling Green Hot Rods, attended by 4,467 fans. The stadium's highest attendance was 5,121 for a 9-0 Hub City win over the Asheville Tourists on June 14, 2026.
