= Brock Porter =

American baseball player (born 2003)

Texas Rangers
- Pitcher
- Born: June 3, 2003 (age 23); Milford, Michigan, U.S.
- Bats: Right Throws: Right

Brock Matthew Porter (born June 3, 2003) is an American professional baseball pitcher in the Texas Rangers organization.

== Amateur career ==
Porter attended St. Mary's Preparatory in Orchard Lake Village, Michigan. As a freshman in 2019, he pitched to a 9–2 record with a 1.20 ERA and 85 strikeouts, leading St. Mary's to a state championship. He committed to play college baseball at Clemson University after his freshman year, choosing the Tigers over offers from Duke University, the University of Miami, and the University of Tennessee. As a junior in 2021, he went 12–0 with a 0.56 ERA and 126 strikeouts over 62 1/3 innings, leading St. Mary's to a 43–1 record and another state title. He was named the Gatorade Player of the Year for the state of Michigan.

Porter entered his senior season in 2022 as a top prospect for the upcoming draft. During the season, he threw a no-hitter in which he struck out 11 batters on 47 pitches. He was named the Gatorade Michigan Player of the Year for the second straight season. Porter was also named the Gatorade Baseball Player of the Year. He finished his senior year with a 9–0 record, a 0.29 ERA, 109 strikeouts and 23 walks, helping St. Mary's to a perfect 44–0 record.

== Professional career ==
Expected to be a first-round selection in the 2022 Major League Baseball draft, Porter was not selected until the fourth round with the 109th overall selection by the Texas Rangers. On July 27, 2022, Porter signed with Texas for a $3.7 million signing bonus, the largest ever given to a pick after the second round. Porter spent the his first professional season in 2023 with the Single-A Down East Wood Ducks, going 0–3 with a 2.47 ERA and 95 strikeouts over 69 1/3 innings in 21 starts.

Porter was assigned to the High-A Hickory Crawdads to open the 2024 season, giving up six runs and 13 walks over 8 1/3 innings. He was reassigned to the Rookie-level Arizona Complex League Rangers and pitched 11 innings, posting a 7.36 ERA, and spent the remainder of the season working at the club's facility in Arizona. Porter was assigned back to Hickory (now members of Single-A) to open the 2025 season and began pitching out of the bullpen. He also played in one game for the High-A Hub City Spartanburgers. Over 42 relief appearances for the season, Porter went 5–1 with a 3.03 ERA, 79 strikeouts, and 40 walks over 68 1/3 innings. In 2026, he played with Hub City and the Double-A Frisco RoughRiders and had an 8–4 record, a 4.01 ERA, 90 strikeouts, and 60 walks over 76 1/3 innings.
